= List of Amaranthus species =

The following species in the flowering plant genus Amaranthus, the amaranths, are accepted by Plants of the World Online. A number of these species are neglected and underutilized crops.

- Amaranthus acanthobracteatus Henrard
- Amaranthus acanthochiton J.D.Sauer
- Amaranthus acutilobus Uline & W.L.Bray
- Amaranthus × adulterinus Thell.
- Amaranthus albus L.
- Amaranthus anderssonii J.T.Howell
- Amaranthus arenicola I.M.Johnst.
- Amaranthus asplundii Thell.
- Amaranthus atropurpureus Roxb.
- Amaranthus aureus F.Dietr.
- Amaranthus australis (A.Gray) J.D.Sauer
- Amaranthus bahiensis Mart.
- Amaranthus bengalense Saubhik Das & Iamonico
- Amaranthus blitoides S.Watson
- Amaranthus blitum L.
- Amaranthus brandegeei Standl.
- Amaranthus brownii Christoph. & Caum
- Amaranthus × budensis Priszter
- Amaranthus × cacciatoi (Aellen ex Cacciato) Iamonico
- Amaranthus californicus (Moq.) S.Watson
- Amaranthus cannabinus (L.) J.D.Sauer
- Amaranthus capensis Thell.
- Amaranthus cardenasianus Hunz.
- Amaranthus × caturus B.Heyne ex Hook.f.
- Amaranthus caudatus L.
- Amaranthus celosioides Kunth
- Amaranthus centralis J.Palmer & Mowatt
- Amaranthus clementii Domin
- Amaranthus cochleitepalus Domin
- Amaranthus commutatus A.Kern.
- Amaranthus congestus C.C.Towns.
- Amaranthus crassipes Schltdl.
- Amaranthus crispus (Lesp. & Thévenau) A.Braun ex J.M.Coult. & S.Watson
- Amaranthus cruentus L.
- Amaranthus cuspidifolius Domin
- Amaranthus deflexus L.
- Amaranthus dinteri Schinz
- Amaranthus fimbriatus (Torr.) Benth.
- Amaranthus floridanus (S.Watson) J.D.Sauer
- Amaranthus furcatus J.T.Howell
- Amaranthus graecizans L.
- Amaranthus grandiflorus (J.M.Black) J.M.Black
- Amaranthus greggii S.Watson
- Amaranthus hunzikeri N.Bayón
- Amaranthus hybridus L.
- Amaranthus hypochondriacus L.
- Amaranthus induratus C.A.Gardner ex J.Palmer & Mowatt
- Amaranthus interruptus R.Br.
- Amaranthus × jansen-wachterianus Thell.
- Amaranthus kloosianus Hunz.
- Amaranthus lepturus S.F.Blake
- Amaranthus lombardoi Hunz.
- Amaranthus looseri Suess.
- Amaranthus macrocarpus Benth.
- Amaranthus minimus Standl.
- Amaranthus mitchellii Benth.
- Amaranthus muricatus (Gillies ex Moq.) Hieron.
- Amaranthus neei D.B.Pratt, Sánch.Pino & Flores Olv.
- Amaranthus obcordatus (A.Gray) Standl.
- Amaranthus palmeri S.Watson
- Amaranthus paraganensis Saubhik Das
- Amaranthus pedersenianus N.Bayón & C.Peláez
- Amaranthus persimilis Hunz.
- Amaranthus peruvianus (Schauer) Standl.
- Amaranthus polygonoides L.
- Amaranthus powellii S.Watson
- Amaranthus praetermissus Brenan
- Amaranthus pumilus Raf.
- Amaranthus × pyxidatus (Contré) Iamonico
- Amaranthus rajasekharii Sindu Arya, V.S.A.Kumar, W.K.Vishnu & Iamonico
- Amaranthus × ralletii Contré
- Amaranthus retroflexus L.
- Amaranthus rhombeus R.Br.
- Amaranthus rosengurttii Hunz.
- Amaranthus saradhiana Sindu Arya, V.S.A.Kumar, W.K.Vishnu & Rajesh Kumar
- Amaranthus scariosus Benth.
- Amaranthus schinzianus Thell.
- Amaranthus scleranthoides (Andersson) Andersson
- Amaranthus scleropoides Uline & W.L.Bray
- Amaranthus sonoriensis Iamonico & El Mokni
- Amaranthus × soproniensis Priszter & Kárpáti
- Amaranthus sparganicephalus Thell.
- Amaranthus spinosus L.
- Amaranthus squamulatus (Andersson) B.L.Rob.
- Amaranthus standleyanus Parodi ex Covas
- Amaranthus × tamariscinus Nutt.
- Amaranthus tamaulipensis Henrickson
- Amaranthus × texensis Henrickson
- Amaranthus thunbergii Moq.
- Amaranthus torreyi (A.Gray) Benth. ex S.Watson
- Amaranthus tortuosus Hornem.
- Amaranthus tricolor L.
- Amaranthus tuberculatus (Moq.) J.D.Sauer
- Amaranthus tucsonensis Henrickson
- Amaranthus tunetanus Iamonico & El Mokni
- Amaranthus undulatus R.Br.
- Amaranthus urceolatus Benth.
- Amaranthus viridis L.
- Amaranthus viscidulus Greene
- Amaranthus vulgatissimus Speg.
- Amaranthus watsonii Standl.
- Amaranthus wrightii S.Watson
