= Water-hemp =

Water-hemp or waterhemp is a common name for several plants and may refer:

In the genus Amaranthus:

- Amaranthus australis - southern water-hemp
- Amaranthus cannabinus - salt-marsh water-hemp, tidal marsh water-hemp or water-hemp pigweed
- Amaranthus floridanus - Florida water-hemp
- Amaranthus tuberculatus - rough-fruit water-hemp or tall water-hemp

In other genera:

- Ayapana triplinervis
