= Pigweed =

Pigweed can mean any of a number of weedy plants which may be used as pig fodder:

- Amaranthus species
  - Amaranthus albus, white pigweed, tumble pigweed
  - Amaranthus blitoides, prostrate pigweed
  - Amaranthus californicus, California pigweed
  - Amaranthus fimbriatus, fringed pigweed
  - Amaranthus hybridus, smooth pigweed
  - Amaranthus palmeri, the 'pigweed' resistant to glyphosate in the US Southeast
  - Amaranthus retroflexus, redroot pigweed
- Chenopodium album white goosefoot
- Polygonum aviculare
- Portulaca species

== See also ==
- Hogweed
