= Coleophora darwini =

Scientific classification
- Kingdom: Animalia
- Phylum: Arthropoda
- Clade: Pancrustacea
- Class: Insecta
- Order: Lepidoptera
- Family: Coleophoridae
- Genus: Coleophora
- Species: C. darwini

Binomial name
- Coleophora darwini Landry, 2006

Species of moth

Coleophora darwini is a moth of the family Coleophoridae. It is found on the Galápagos archipelago where it has been collected on Pinzón, Española, and Pinta islands.

The wingspan is 7.8-9.4 mm for males and 8.4-10.6 mm for females.

The larvae feed on Amaranthus anderssonii and probably other Amaranthus species. They mine the leaves of their host plant. The length of the mature case is 5.5–6.9 mm.
