= A. greggii =

A. greggii may refer to:

- Acacia greggii, a tree species native to the southwestern United States and northern Mexico
- Amaranthus greggii, the Gregg's amaranth or Josiah amaranth, an annual flowering plant species native to Texas, Louisiana and Mexico

== See also ==
- Greggii
