= Flora of Ashmore and Cartier Islands =

Overview of flora in Indian-ocean archipelago

The Ashmore and Cartier Islands have 16 families, 23 genera and 27 species of plants. Four of these species are introduced and naturalised. In addition, two species have been introduced but not naturalised. The vegetation is dominated by shrubs, grasses and creepers. The vast majority of species have seeds that are very easily transported by the wind, birds or the sea.

== Flora of Ashmore Reef ==
The following plant taxa occur on the islands of Ashmore Reef:

Taxon	Common name	Remarks
Amaranthus interruptus		
Heliotropium foertherianum		
Boerhavia albiflora		
Boerhavia burbidgeana		
Boerhavia glabrata		
Boerhavia repens		
Cassytha filiformis		
Cenchrus brownii		Naturalised
Cenchrus ciliaris		Naturalised
Cleome gynandra		
Cordia subcordata	Tou	
Digitaria mariannensis		
Eragrostis elongata		
Guettarda speciosa		
Ipomoea macrantha		
Ipomoea pes-caprae subsp. brasiliensis		
Lepturus repens		
Portulaca oleracea	Common Purslane	Naturalised
Portulaca tuberosa		
Scaevola taccada		
Sesbania cannabina var. cannabina		Naturalised
Sida pusilla		
Spinifex littoreus		
Sporobulus virginicus		
Suriana maritima		
Thalassia hemprichii		
Tribulus cistoides		

In addition to these, Zea mays (Maize) and Cocos nucifera (Coconut) have been introduced by visiting Indonesian fishermen as food sources, but these are not naturalised.

== Flora of Cartier Island ==
Cartier Island is unvegetated. The only recorded plant is the seagrass Thallassia hemprichii, which forms meadows in pockets of sand among the reef.
