= Amaranthus edulis =

Amaranthus edulis can refer to:

- Amaranthus edulis Michx. ex Moq., a synonym of Amaranthus cannabinus (L.) J.D.Sauer
- Amaranthus edulis Speg., a synonym of Amaranthus caudatus L.
