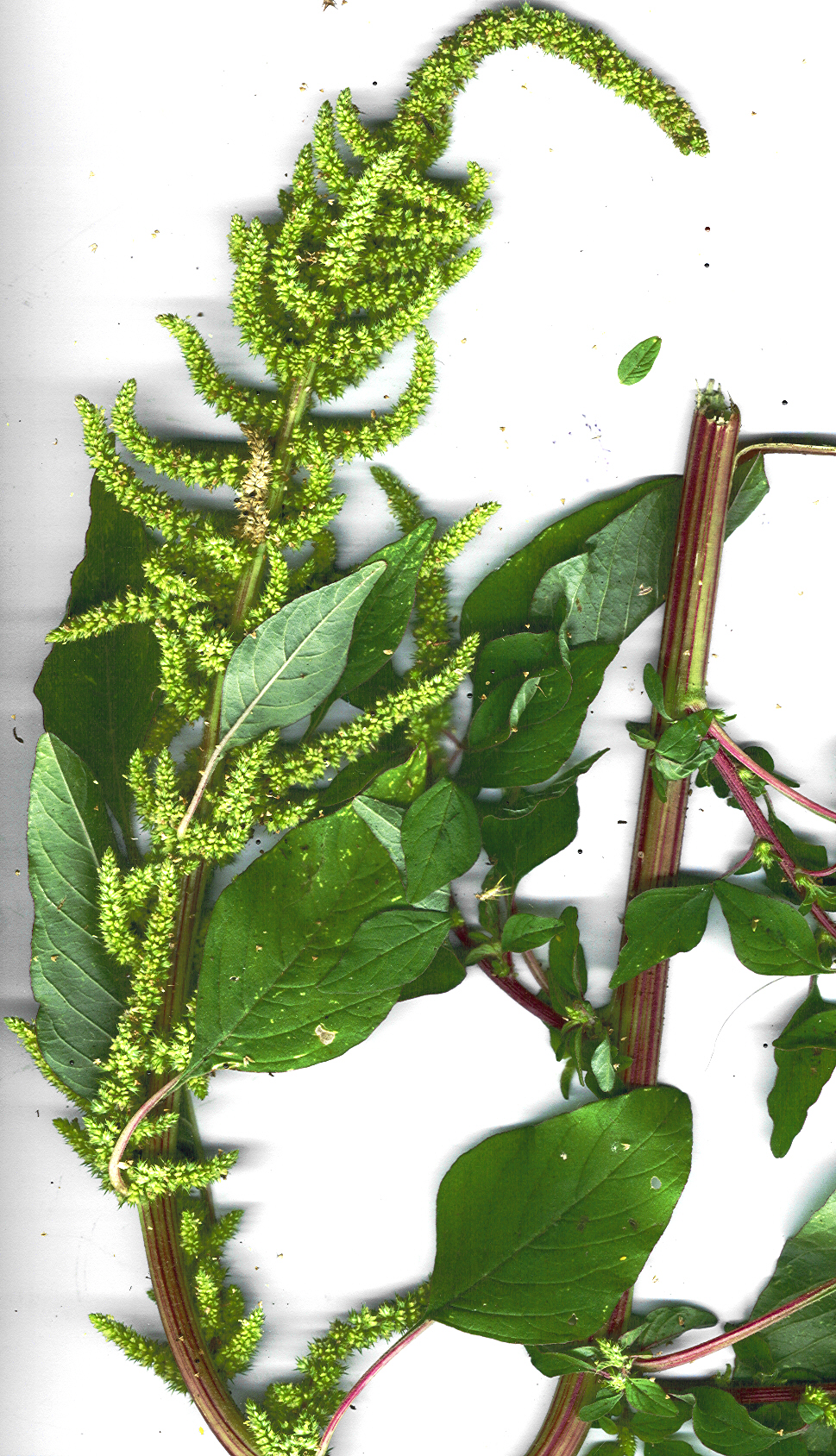

Scientific classification
- Kingdom: Plantae
- Clade: Tracheophytes
- Clade: Angiosperms
- Clade: Eudicots
- Order: Caryophyllales
- Family: Amaranthaceae
- Genus: Amaranthus
- Species: A. dubius

Binomial name
- Amaranthus dubius Mart. ex Thell.

= Amaranthus dubius =

Species of flowering plant

Amaranthus dubius, the red spinach, Chinese spinach, (simplified Chinese: 苋菜; traditional Chinese: 莧菜; pinyin: xiàncài), spleen amaranth, hon-toi-moi, yin choy, hsien tsai, or Arai keerai (அரைக்கீரை) is a plant species. It belongs to the economically important family Amaranthaceae.

This plant is native to South America, Mexico, and the West Indies, however; it is widely introduced throughout the world. The species occurs locally in France and Germany and is naturalized or invasive in tropical and subtropical regions of the United States (Florida and Hawaii), Africa, Asia, Australia and the Pacific.

== Description ==
Usually it grows to a size of 80–120 centimetres (31–47 in). It has both green and red varieties, as well as some with mixed colors. The green variety is practically indistinguishable from Amaranthus viridis.

It flowers from summer to fall in the tropics, but can flower throughout the year in subtropical conditions. It is a ruderal species, usually found in waste places or disturbed habitats.

Amaranthus dubius is considered to be a morphologically deviant allopolyploid. It is very close genetically to Amaranthus spinosus and other Amaranthus species.

== As food ==
This species is valued as a leafy vegetable throughout South and Southeast Asia and also in Africa. It may be eaten raw in thoran or cooked in curry and bhajis. In Uganda, it is commonly cooked with onions, tomatoes and peanut sauce.
