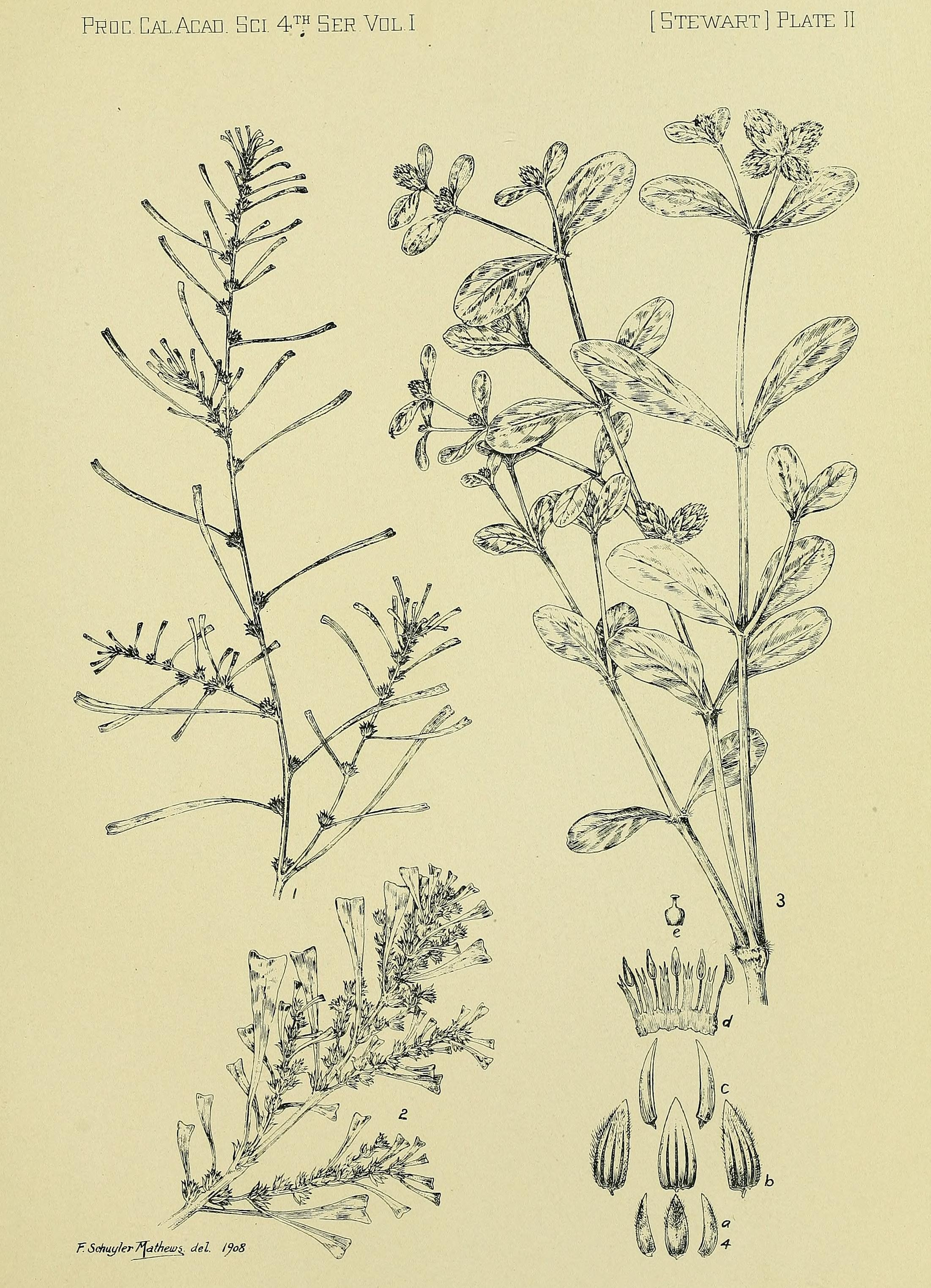

Conservation status
- Least Concern (IUCN 3.1)

Scientific classification
- Kingdom: Plantae
- Clade: Tracheophytes
- Clade: Angiosperms
- Clade: Eudicots
- Order: Caryophyllales
- Family: Amaranthaceae
- Genus: Amaranthus
- Species: A. sclerantoides

Binomial name
- Amaranthus sclerantoides Andersson

= Amaranthus sclerantoides =

Species of flowering plant

Amaranthus sclerantoides is a species of plant in the family Amaranthaceae. It is endemic to Ecuador.
