= Amaranthus grandiflorus =

Scientific classification
- Kingdom: Plantae
- Clade: Tracheophytes
- Clade: Angiosperms
- Clade: Eudicots
- Order: Caryophyllales
- Family: Amaranthaceae
- Genus: Amaranthus
- Species: A. grandiflorus

Binomial name
- Amaranthus grandiflorus (J.M.Black) J.M.Black

Synonyms
- Amaranthus mitchellii var. grandiflorus J.M.Black

Species of plant

Amaranthus grandiflorus is a species of Amaranthus found in Australia.

== Description ==
Amaranthus grandiflorus is an annual plant, reaching up to 40 centimetres (16 in) tall. The leaves are ovate to lanceolate, and up to 5 centimetres (2.0 in), with an acute tip. The flowers are clustered into inflorescences, borne in the axils. The petals are 5–7 millimetres (0.20–0.28 in) long.

== Distribution and ecology ==
Amaranthus grandiflorus is found in Northern Territory, South Australia, Queensland, New South Wales and Victoria. It lives in inland areas, especially drier regions such as areas of red sand.

== Taxonomy ==
Amaranthus grandiflorus was originally described in 1923 by John McConnell Black as a variety of Amaranthus mitchellii.
