= Amaranthus chihuahuensis =

Chihuahuan amaranth

Scientific classification
- Kingdom: Plantae
- Clade: Tracheophytes
- Clade: Angiosperms
- Clade: Eudicots
- Order: Caryophyllales
- Family: Amaranthaceae
- Genus: Amaranthus
- Species: A. chihuahuensis

Binomial name
- Amaranthus chihuahuensis S.Watson

Species of flowering plant

Amaranthus chihuahuensis is a species of plant also known as Chihuahuan amaranth. Notably, it is not native to the United States and is instead found in Oaxaca and Chihuahua in Mexico. Some reports have suggested that it is present in lower Texas, but further evidence is necessary. Its taxonomic identity is considered to be unsure.
