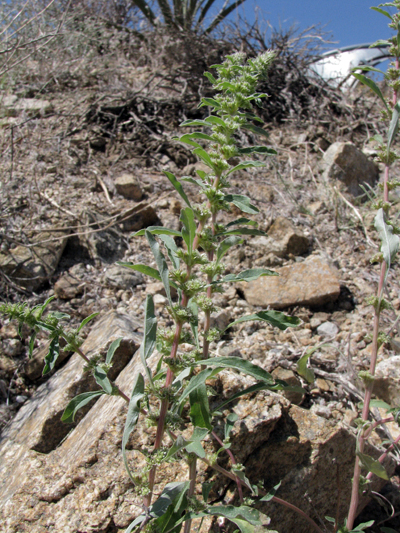

Scientific classification
- Kingdom: Plantae
- Clade: Tracheophytes
- Clade: Angiosperms
- Clade: Eudicots
- Order: Caryophyllales
- Family: Amaranthaceae
- Genus: Amaranthus
- Species: A. torreyi

Binomial name
- Amaranthus torreyi Benth. ex S.Watson

= Amaranthus torreyi =

Species of flowering plant

Amaranthus torreyi is a species of flowering plant that is sometimes considered to be a synonym of Amaranthus watsonii. Its common name is Torrey's Amaranth. It is native to the southwestern United States and northern Mexico.
