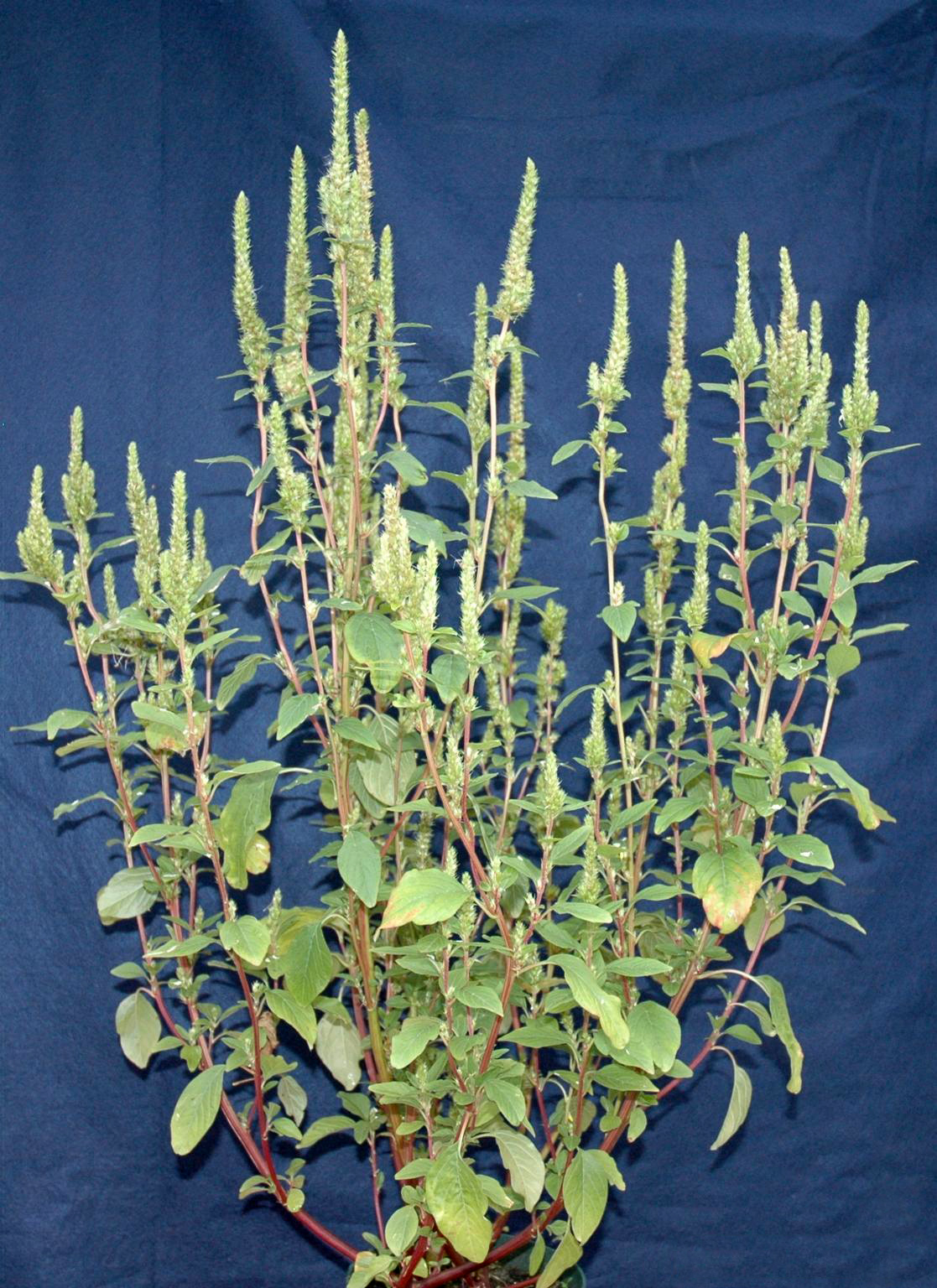

Conservation status
- Secure (NatureServe)

Scientific classification
- Kingdom: Plantae
- Clade: Embryophytes
- Clade: Tracheophytes
- Clade: Angiosperms
- Clade: Eudicots
- Order: Caryophyllales
- Family: Amaranthaceae
- Genus: Amaranthus
- Species: A. powellii

Binomial name
- Amaranthus powellii S.Wats.

= Amaranthus powellii =

Species of flowering plant

Amaranthus powellii is a species of amaranth known by the common names Powell's amaranth and green amaranth.

It is native to the southwestern United States and northern Mexico, but it is common throughout most of the rest of the temperate Americas as a naturalized species. It has also been introduced to other continents, including Australia and Europe.

== Description ==
This is an erect annual herb growing to a maximum height near 2 m (6 ft 7 in). It has leaves up to 9 cm (3.5 in) long, those on the upper part of the plant lance-shaped and lower on the stem diamond or roughly oval in shape. The inflorescence holds several long, narrow clusters of both male and female flowers interspersed with spiny green bracts. The fruit is a smooth dehiscent capsule about 3 mm (0.12 in) long containing shiny, reddish-black seeds.
