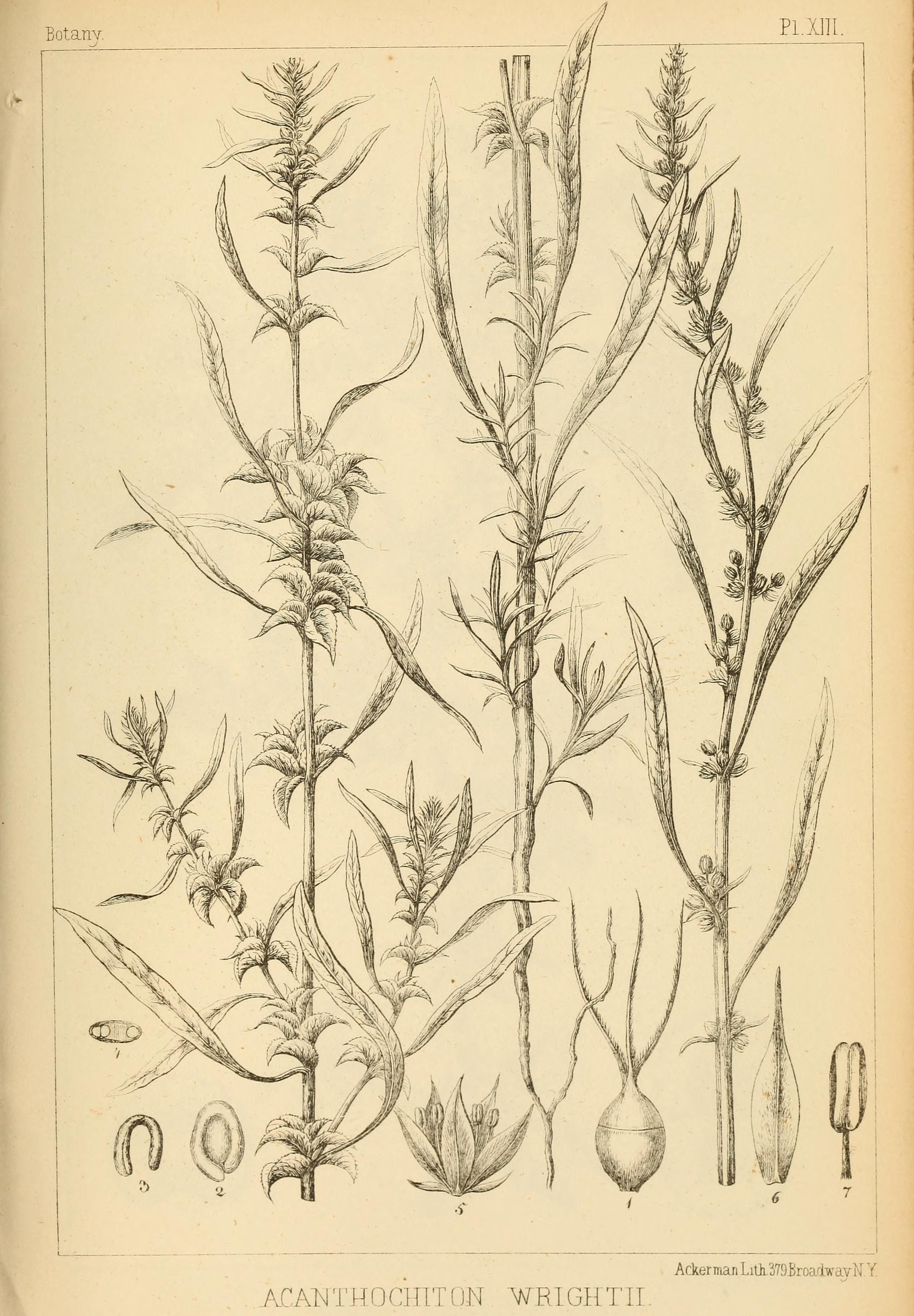

Conservation status
- Secure (NatureServe)

Scientific classification
- Kingdom: Plantae
- Clade: Embryophytes
- Clade: Tracheophytes
- Clade: Spermatophytes
- Clade: Angiosperms
- Clade: Eudicots
- Order: Caryophyllales
- Family: Amaranthaceae
- Genus: Amaranthus
- Species: A. wrightii

Binomial name
- Amaranthus wrightii S.Watson

= Amaranthus wrightii =

Species of flowering plant

Amaranthus wrightii is a species of flowering plant. It goes by the common name of Wright's amaranth. It occurs from western Texas into southern Arizona and as far north as Colorado at elevations between 500–2,000 m (1,600–6,600 ft).

== Description ==
Amaranthus wrightii is a mostly glabrous plant growing 0.2–1 m (7.9 in – 3 ft 3.4 in) tall. The erect or ascending stems are tinged with white or red. The rhombic-ovate to lanceolate leaves are 1.5–6 cm (0.59–2.36 in) long and 0.5–3 cm (0.20–1.18 in) wide, with petioles slightly shorter than the leaves. The base of the leaves are acute, the leaf margins are entire, and the apex of the leaves are obtuse. The terminal and axillary inflorescences are short and thick, and reddish-green. The linear-lanceolate bracts are twice as long as the tepals. The pistillate flowers have five tepals and are 1.5–2 mm (0.059–0.079 in) wide. The staminate flowers also have five tepals and grow at the tips of inflorescences. The utricles are 1.3–2 mm (0.051–0.079 in) wide. The dark reddish to black seeds are 1 mm (0.039 in) wide and lenticular.

The plant flowers from summer into fall.
