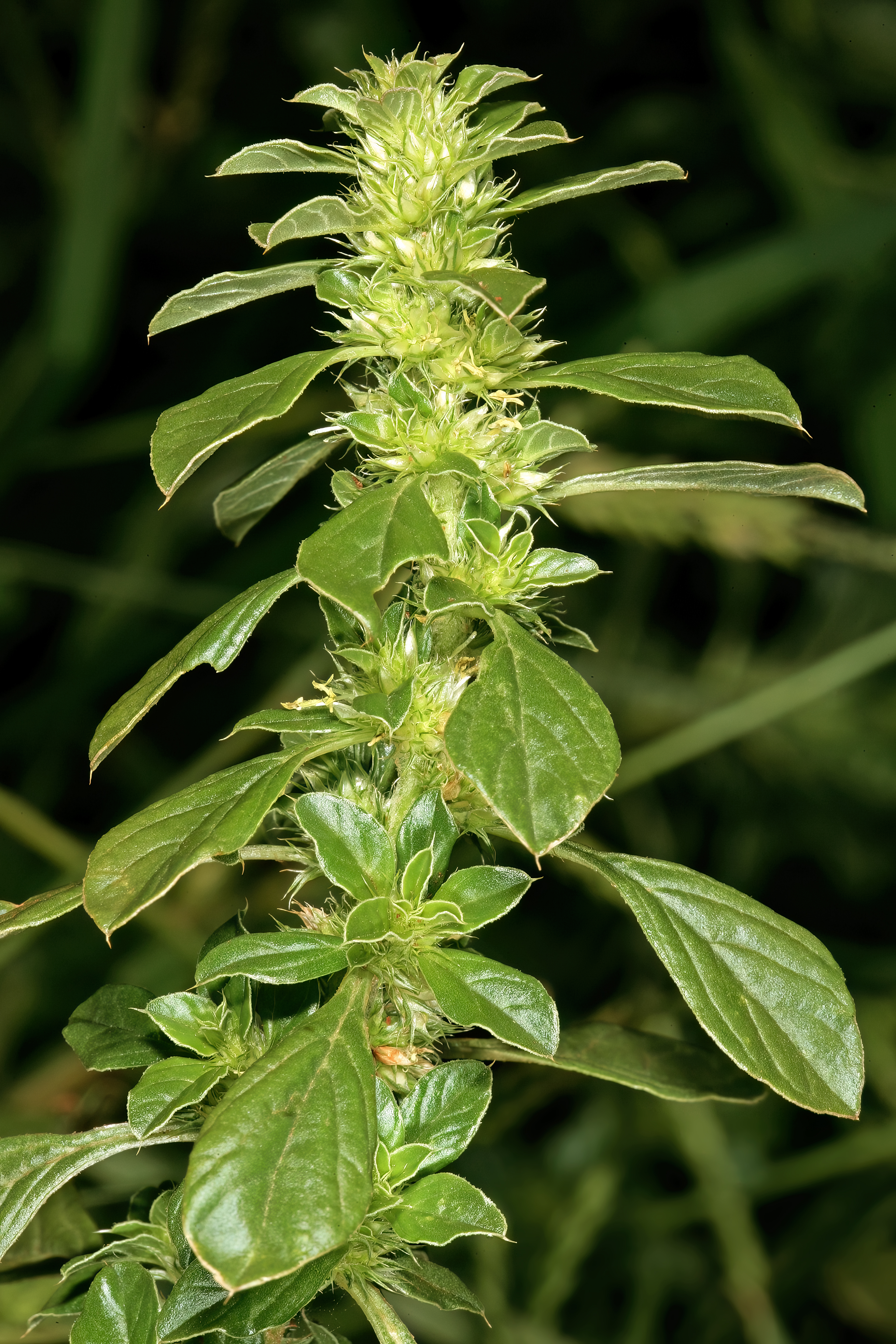

Scientific classification
- Kingdom: Plantae
- Clade: Tracheophytes
- Clade: Angiosperms
- Clade: Eudicots
- Order: Caryophyllales
- Family: Amaranthaceae
- Genus: Amaranthus
- Species: A. thunbergii

Binomial name
- Amaranthus thunbergii Moq.
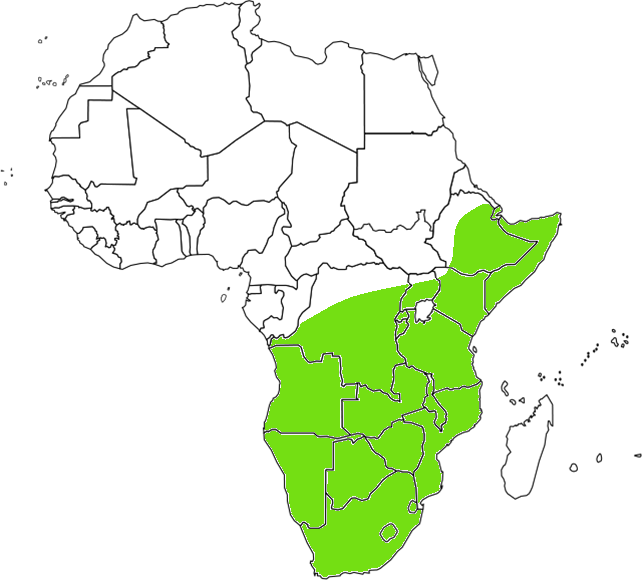
- approximate range

= Amaranthus thunbergii =

Thunberg's amaranthus

Species of flowering plant

Amaranthus thunbergii, commonly known as Thunberg's amaranthus or Thunberg's pigweed, is found in Africa.

The leaves are used as a flavouring or leafy vegetable.
