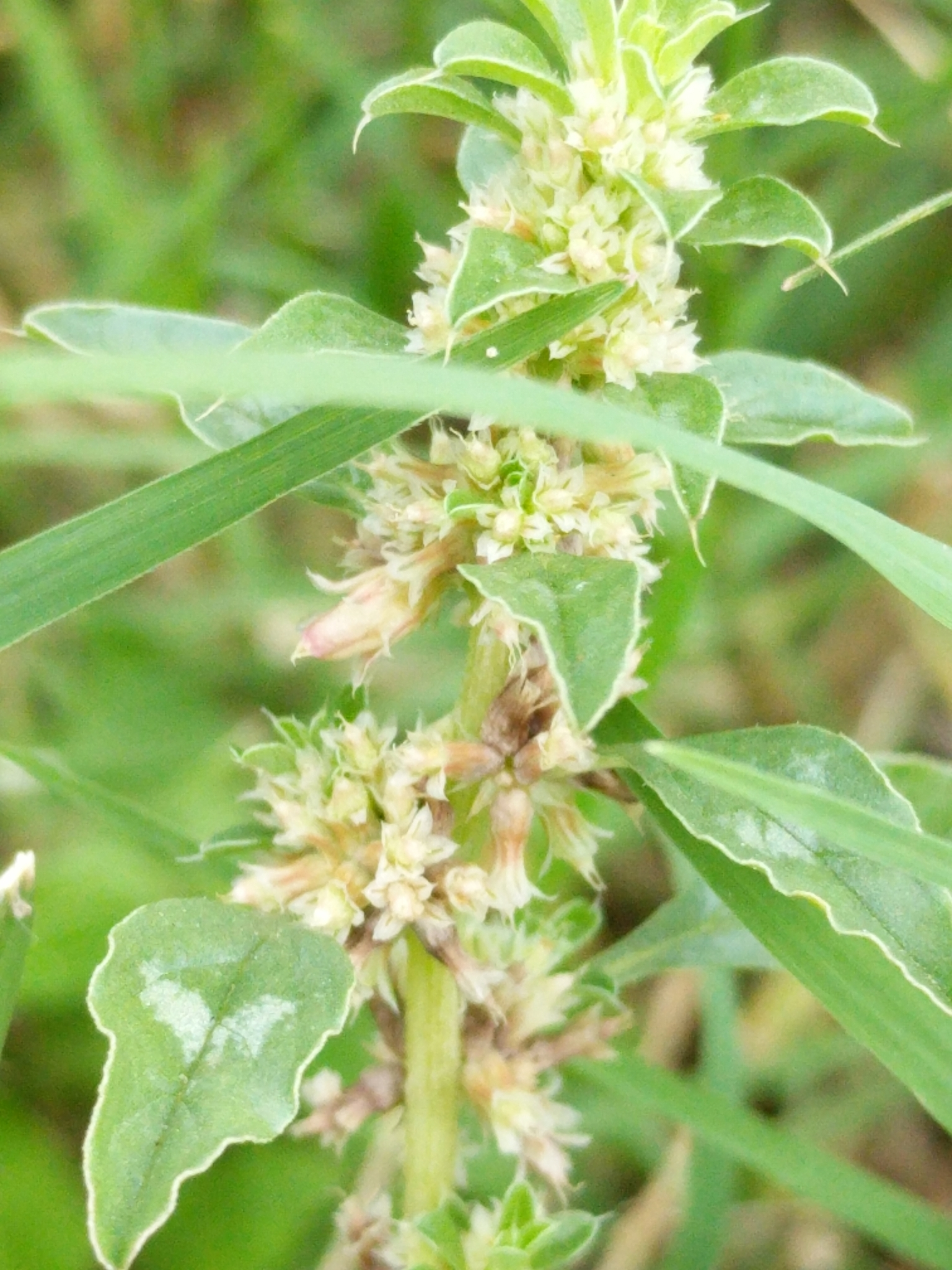

Scientific classification
- Kingdom: Plantae
- Clade: Tracheophytes
- Clade: Angiosperms
- Clade: Eudicots
- Order: Caryophyllales
- Family: Amaranthaceae
- Genus: Amaranthus
- Species: A. polygonoides

Binomial name
- Amaranthus polygonoides L.

Subspecies and varieties
- Amaranthus polygonoides var. berlandieri (Moq.) Iamonico; Amaranthus polygonoides subsp. polygonoides; Amaranthus polygonoides subsp. urceolatus (Andersson) Iamonico

Synonyms
- Albersia polygonoides (L.) Kunth; Amblogyna polygonoides (L.) Raf.; Glomeraria polygonoides (L.) Cav.; Roemeria polygonoides (L.) Moench; Sarratia polygonoides (L.) Moq.

= Amaranthus polygonoides =

Species of flowering plant

Amaranthus polygonoides is a species of flowering plant in the family Amaranthaceae. It is an annual native to Mexico, northern Central America, the Caribbean, the Galápagos, and portions of the south-central and southeastern United States. It goes by the common name of tropical amaranth.

== Subdivisions ==
Three subdivisions are accepted:

- Amaranthus polygonoides var. berlandieri (Moq.) Iamonico – south-central United States to Honduras
- Amaranthus polygonoides subsp. polygonoides – Caribbean, Florida, South Carolina, and Texas
- Amaranthus polygonoides subsp. urceolatus (Andersson) Iamonico – Galápagos
