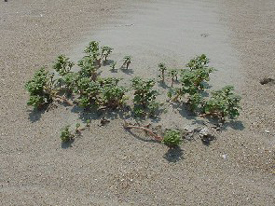

Conservation status
- Imperiled (NatureServe)

- Threatened (ESA)

Scientific classification
- Kingdom: Plantae
- Clade: Tracheophytes
- Clade: Angiosperms
- Clade: Eudicots
- Order: Caryophyllales
- Family: Amaranthaceae
- Genus: Amaranthus
- Species: A. pumilus

Binomial name
- Amaranthus pumilus Raf.

= Amaranthus pumilus =

Species of flowering plant

Amaranthus pumilus, the seaside amaranth or seabeach amaranth, is a species of amaranth. This annual plant is now a threatened species, although it was formerly scattered along the eastern coast of the United States, its native range.

== History ==
The seaside amaranth once ranged widely from South Carolina to Massachusetts. It was first identified in New Jersey, but disappeared in that state by 1913. It is now gone from two thirds of its original range. This plant has reappeared on some areas where it was formerly extirpated by habitat loss and recreational activities.

== Description ==
The plant consists of many low and prostrate stems with fleshy leaves. Larger plants with hundreds of stems may cover an area of about a meter. Yellow flowers are obscure, but many seeds are produced in July. The lengthy viability of these seeds may account for the reappearance of Amaranthus pumilus in places where it had formerly vanished.

== Habitat ==
This plant is found on sandy beaches, especially on barrier islands. It flourishes at the base of dunes above the high water mark. Although the seaside amaranth is found in the neighborhood of other beach plants, it is intolerant of all but American sea rocket (Cakile edentula). The plant is important in the sandy beach ecosystem, accumulating sand around itself to form dunes.

== Conservation status in the United States ==
The plant was listed as a threatened species of the United States in 1993. There are perhaps 50 populations remaining. It is listed as a special concern and believed extirpated in Connecticut, as threatened in North Carolina, and as endangered in Maryland, New Jersey, New York, and Rhode Island. Threats include disturbance of its beach habitat through development, construction of seawalls, off-road vehicle activity, and other forces.
