= Eukaryotic chromosome structure =

Eukaryotic chromosome structure refers to the levels of packaging from raw DNA molecules to the chromosomal structures seen during metaphase in mitosis or meiosis. Chromosomes contain long strands of DNA containing genetic information. Compared to prokaryotic chromosomes, eukaryotic chromosomes are much larger in size and are linear chromosomes. Eukaryotic chromosomes are also stored in the cell nucleus, while chromosomes of prokaryotic cells are not stored in a nucleus. Eukaryotic chromosomes require a higher level of packaging to condense the DNA molecules into the cell nucleus because of the larger amount of DNA. This level of packaging includes the wrapping of DNA around proteins called histones in order to form condensed nucleosomes.

== History ==
The double helix was discovered in 1953 by James Watson and Francis Crick. Other researchers made very important, but unconnected findings about the composition of DNA. Ultimately it was Watson and Crick who put all of these findings together to come up with a model for DNA. Later, chemist Alexander Todd determined that the backbone of a DNA molecule contained repeating phosphate and deoxyribose sugar groups. The biochemist Erwin Chargaff found that adenine and thymine always paired while cytosine and guanine always paired. High resolution X-ray images of DNA that were obtained by Maurice Wilkins and Rosalind Franklin suggested a helical, or corkscrew like shape. Some of the first scientists to recognize the structures now known as chromosomes were Schleiden, Virchow, and Bütschli. The term was coined by Heinrich Wilhelm Gottfried von Waldeyer-Hartz, referring to the term chromatin, was introduced by Walther Flemming. Scientists also discovered plant and animal cells have a central compartment called the nucleus. They soon realized chromosomes were found inside the nucleus and contained different information for many different traits.

== Structure ==
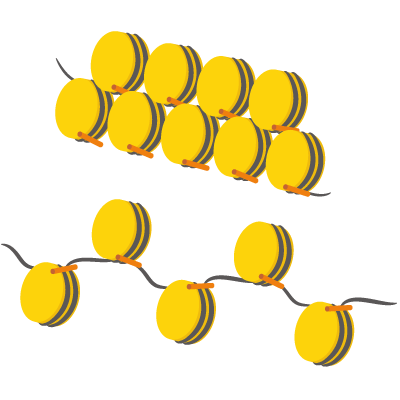
DNA (gray) wraps around proteins known as histones (yellow) in order to form condensed nucleosomes.

Packaging of nucleosomes into higher order chromatin structures involves the use of loops and coils.

In eukaryotes, such as humans, roughly 3.2 billion nucleotides are spread out over 23 different chromosomes (males have both an X chromosome and a Y chromosome instead of a pair of X chromosomes as seen in females). Each chromosome consists enormously long linear DNA molecule associated with proteins that fold and pack the fine thread of DNA into a more compact structure.

Commonly, many people think the structure of a chromosome is in an "X" shape. But this is only present when the cell divides. Researchers have now been able to model the structure of chromosomes when they are active. This is extremely important because the way that DNA folds up in chromosome structures is linked to the way DNA is used. Scientists have been able to develop the 3D structures of chromosomes in a single cell. The scientists used hundreds of measurements of where different parts of the DNA get close to one another to help create this model. This research was done by scientists at the Department of Biochemistry at Cambridge, working with others from the Babraham Institute and the Weizmann Institute.

== Nucleosomes ==
The nucleosome is the basic unit of DNA condensation and consists of a DNA double helix bound to an octamer of core histones (2 dimers of H2A and H2B, and an H3/H4 tetramer). About 147 base pairs of DNA coil around 1 octamer, and ~20 base pairs are sequestered by the addition of the linker histone (H1), and various length of "linker" DNA (~0-100 bp) separate the nucleosomes. The spacing of nucleosomes along DNA results in a “beads on a string” appearance. Histone modification controls the accessibility to DNA. Histone acetyltransferases or HATs acetylate residues on the histone tail leading to increased accessibility to DNA.

== Packaging ==
Packaging of DNA is facilitated by the electrostatic charge distribution: phosphate groups cause DNA to have a negative charge, whilst the histones are positively charged. Most eukaryotic cells contain histones (with a few exceptions) as well as the kingdom Archaea. Specifically histones H3 and H4 are nearly identical in structure among all eukaryotes, suggesting strict evolutionary conservation of both structure and function. Histones are positively charged molecules as they contain lysine and arginine in larger quantities and DNA is negatively charged. This allows histones to make a strong ionic bond to DNA form a nucleosome. The most basic level of DNA condensation is the wrapping of DNA around the histone core proteins. Higher-order packaging is accomplished by specialized proteins that bind and fold the DNA. This generates a series of loops and coils that provide increasingly higher levels of organization and prevent the DNA from becoming tangled and unmanageable. This complex of DNA and proteins are called chromatin. But in addition to proteins involved with packaging, chromosomes are associated with proteins involved with DNA replication, DNA repair, and gene expression.
