= Amaranthus furcatus =

Conservation status
- Data Deficient (IUCN 2.3)

Scientific classification
- Kingdom: Plantae
- Clade: Tracheophytes
- Clade: Angiosperms
- Clade: Eudicots
- Order: Caryophyllales
- Family: Amaranthaceae
- Genus: Amaranthus
- Species: A. furcatus

Binomial name
- Amaranthus furcatus J.T. Howell

Species of flowering plant

Amaranthus furcatus is a species of plant in the family Amaranthaceae. It is endemic to the Galápagos Islands of Ecuador.
