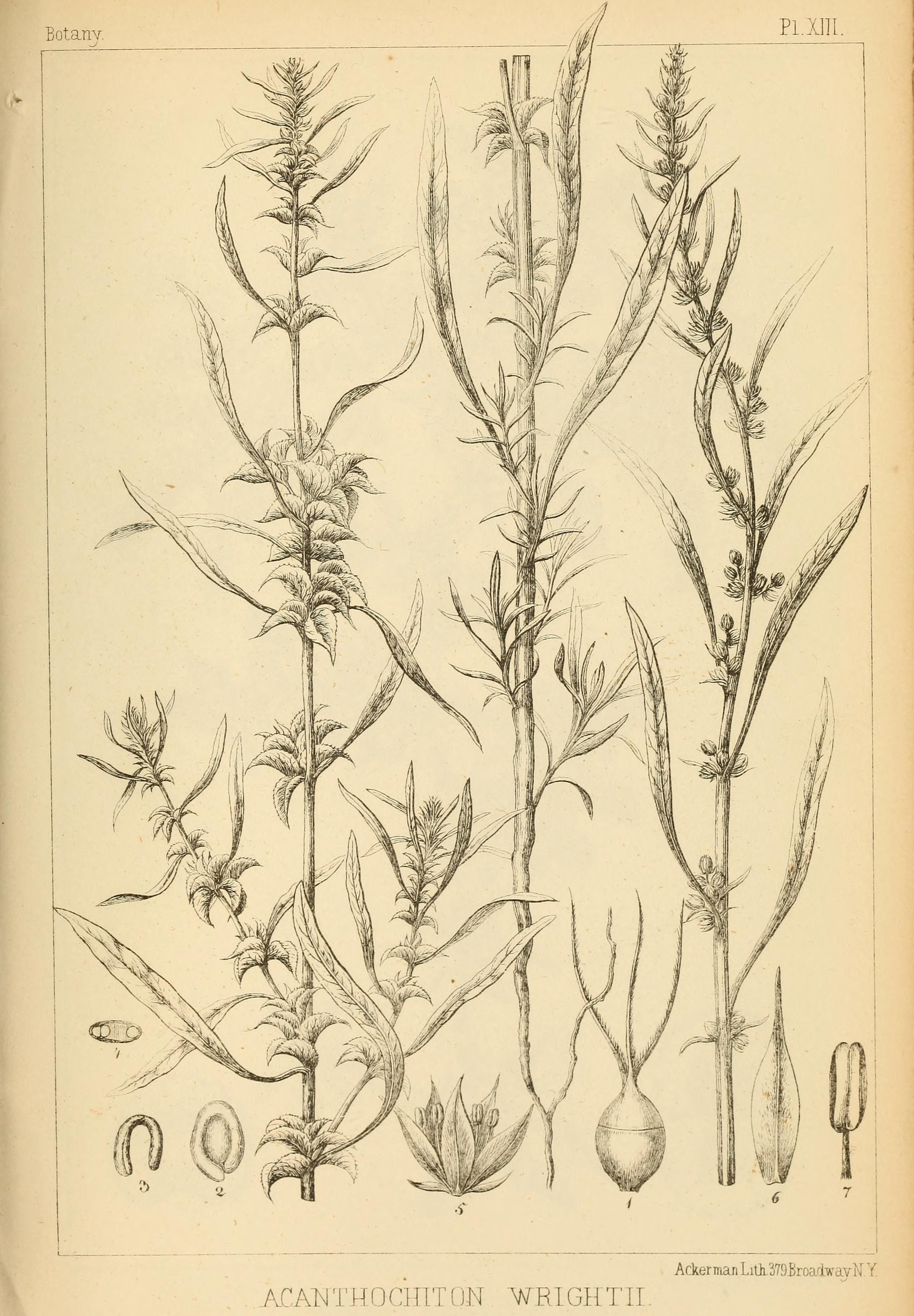

Conservation status
- Secure (NatureServe)

Scientific classification
- Kingdom: Plantae
- Clade: Tracheophytes
- Clade: Angiosperms
- Clade: Eudicots
- Order: Caryophyllales
- Family: Amaranthaceae
- Genus: Amaranthus
- Species: A. acanthochiton

Binomial name
- Amaranthus acanthochiton J.D.Sauer

= Amaranthus acanthochiton =

Greenstripe

Species of flowering plant

Amaranthus acanthochiton, the greenstripe, is an annual plant species of the genus Amaranthus in the family Amaranthaceae. It is native to the southwestern United States (Arizona, New Mexico, Texas, and Utah) and northern Mexico (Chihuahua), growing at elevations of 1000–2000 m where it is uncommon.

It is a dioecious plant growing to 10–80 cm tall. The leaves are slender, 2–8 cm long and 2–12 mm broad. The flowers are pale green, produced in dense terminal spikes. The seeds are brown, 1–1.3 mm diameter, contained in a 2–2.5 mm achene.

It is critically endangered in Utah, and endangered in Arizona (though no status has been set).

The seeds and young leaves were used by the Hopi Indians as a food source.
