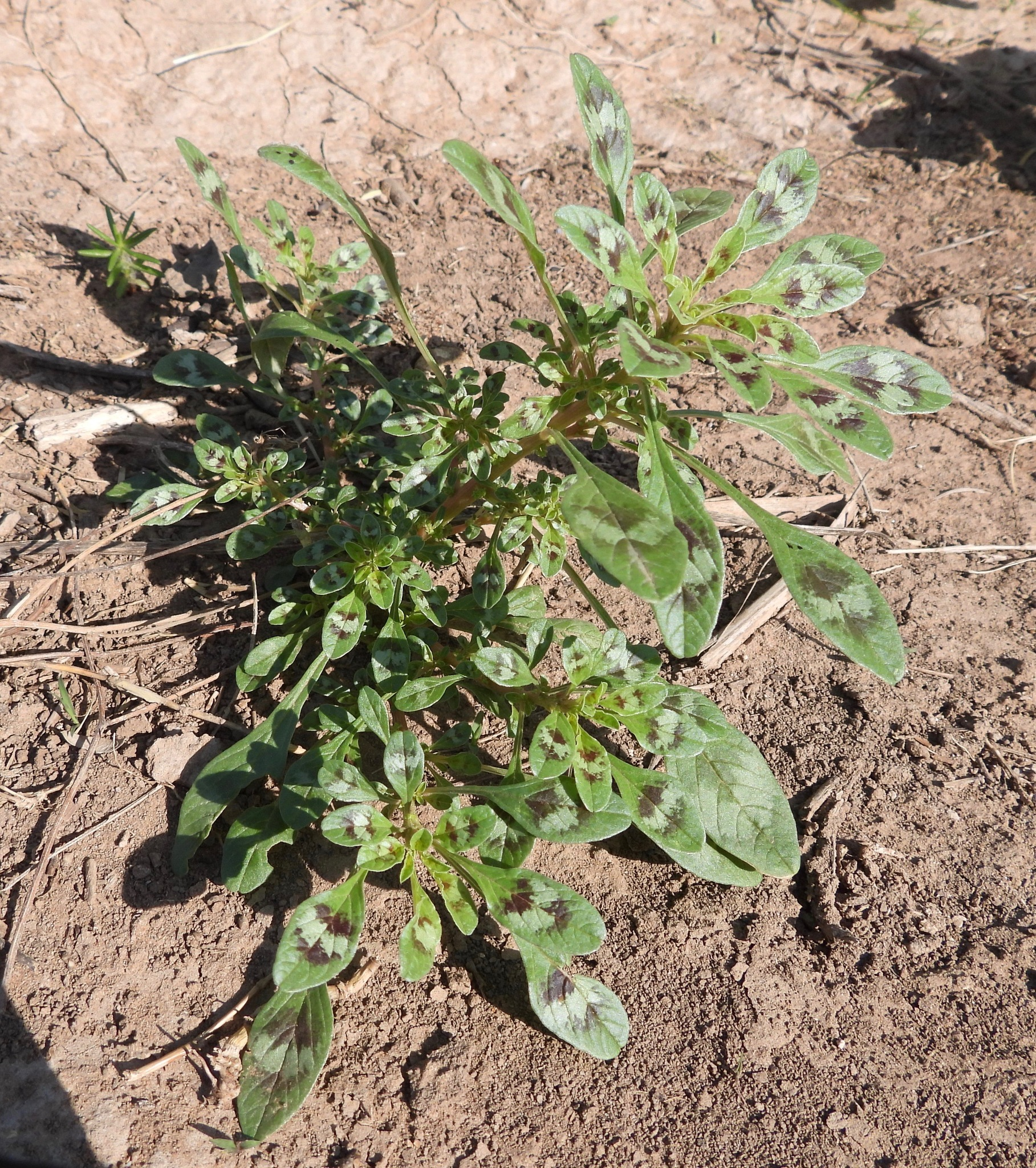

Conservation status
- Secure (NatureServe)

Scientific classification
- Kingdom: Plantae
- Clade: Embryophytes
- Clade: Tracheophytes
- Clade: Angiosperms
- Clade: Eudicots
- Order: Caryophyllales
- Family: Amaranthaceae
- Genus: Amaranthus
- Species: A. crassipes

Binomial name
- Amaranthus crassipes L

= Amaranthus crassipes =

Spreading amaranth

Species of flowering plant

Amaranthus crassipes, also known as spreading amaranth, is a glabrous annual plant that is both native and introduced in the United States. In the U.S., it is found in New Mexico, Arizona, Texas, Alabama, South Carolina, and Louisiana. It is also found in Mexico, the West Indies, and South America.

The plant can grow up to two feet in height. It flowers in the summer and fall. It is usually found near wet habitats or disturbed areas.

Two varieties of A. crassipes have been described: A. crassipes var. crassipes and A. crassipes var. warnockii. The major difference appears to be the leaf structure.
