= Amaranthus greggii =

Gregg's amaranth

Conservation status
- Apparently Secure (NatureServe)

Scientific classification
- Kingdom: Plantae
- Clade: Tracheophytes
- Clade: Angiosperms
- Clade: Eudicots
- Order: Caryophyllales
- Family: Amaranthaceae
- Genus: Amaranthus
- Species: A. greggii

Binomial name
- Amaranthus greggii S.Watson

Species of flowering plant

Amaranthus greggii, also known as Gregg's amaranth or Josiah amaranth, is a glabrous annual flowering plant native to Texas, Louisiana, and Mexico. The plant can grow up to 1 m (3 ft) in height. It is found in sand dunes and near sea beaches. The species name greggii honors Josiah Gregg (1806–1850), a merchant, explorer, naturalist, and author of the American Southwest and Northern Mexico.

According to J. D. Sauer (1972b), Amaranthus myrianthus Standley most probably is a hybrid between Amaranthus arenicola and A. greggii. The seeds of A. greggii are dark brown and shiny, with 1.2-1.7 mm in diameter.
