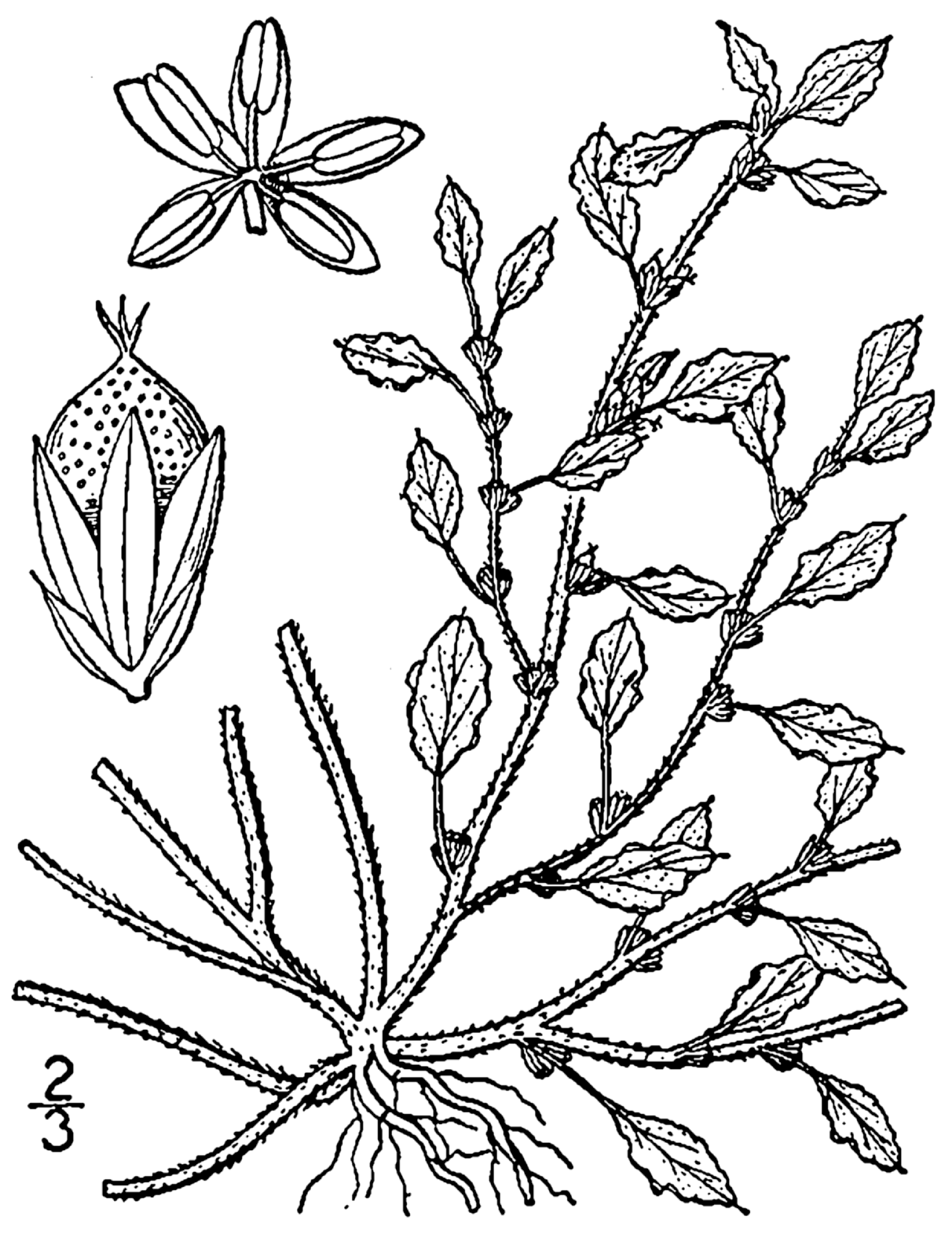

Scientific classification
- Kingdom: Plantae
- Clade: Tracheophytes
- Clade: Angiosperms
- Clade: Eudicots
- Order: Caryophyllales
- Family: Amaranthaceae
- Genus: Amaranthus
- Species: A. crispus

Binomial name
- Amaranthus crispus (Lesp. & Thévenau) A.Braun ex J.M.Coult. & S.Watson

Synonyms
- Albersia crispa (Lesp. & Thévenau) Asch. ex Hausskn. Amaranthus cristulatus Speg. Euxolus crispus Lesp. & Thévenau

= Amaranthus crispus =

Species of plant in the amaranth family

Amaranthus crispus is a species of flowering plant in the family Amaranthaceae. It is referred to by the common name crispleaf amaranth. It is a herbaceous, sparsely pubescent annual plant. It can grow up to 0.5 m (1.5 ft) in height. It flowers in summer to fall. It usually grows in waste places, disturbed habitats, or near water. It is native to Argentina, Chile and Uruguay and has been introduced into Australia, Austria, Bulgaria, Crimea, the former Czechoslovakia, France, Hungary, Italy, Romania, Sardinia, the United States, and the former Yugoslavia.
