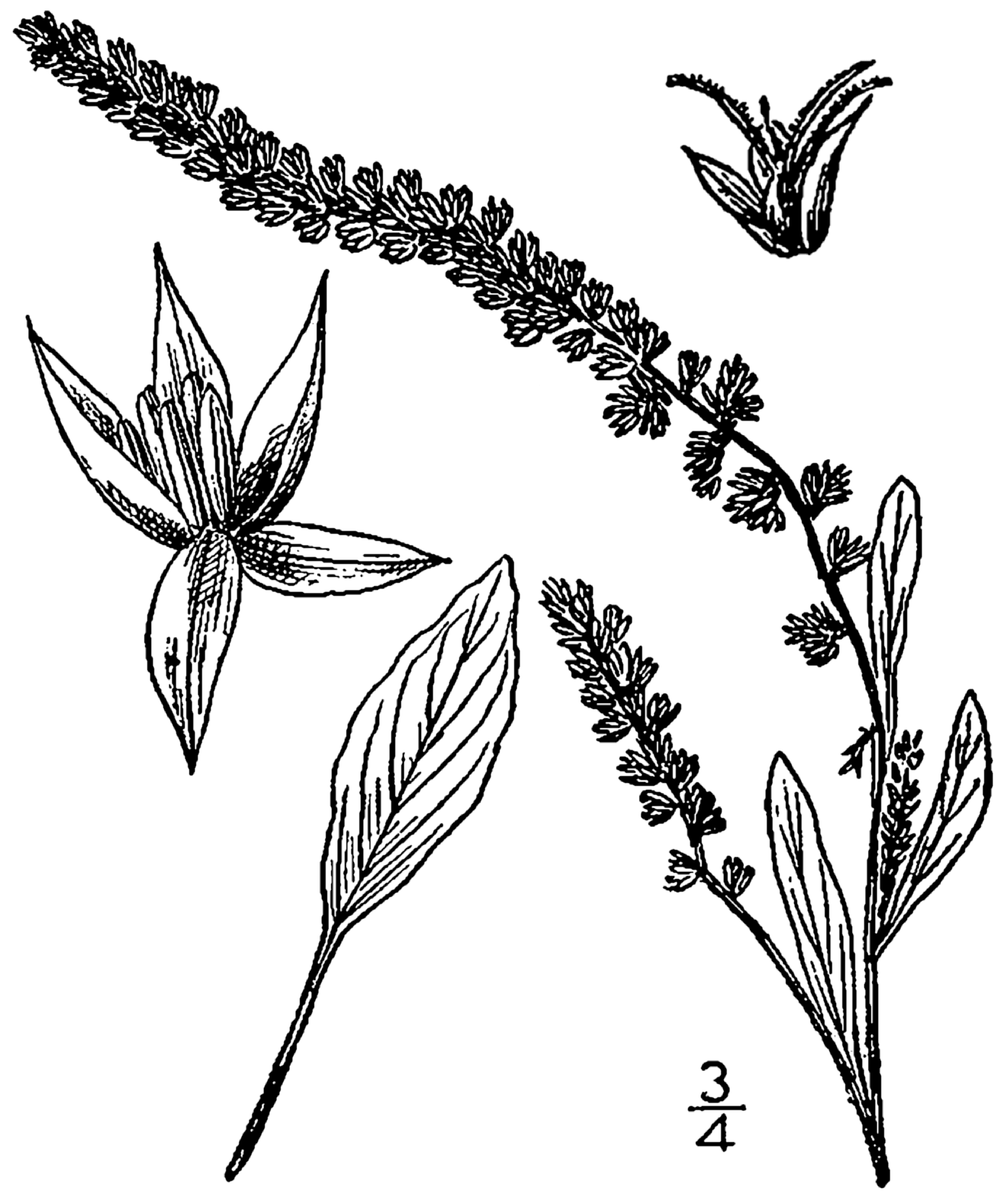

Conservation status
- Apparently Secure (NatureServe)

Scientific classification
- Kingdom: Plantae
- Clade: Tracheophytes
- Clade: Angiosperms
- Clade: Eudicots
- Order: Caryophyllales
- Family: Amaranthaceae
- Genus: Amaranthus
- Species: A. arenicola

Binomial name
- Amaranthus arenicola I.M.Johnst.

= Amaranthus arenicola =

Species of flowering plant

Amaranthus arenicola, commonly called sand amaranth or sandhill amaranth, is a plant species found in many states of the contiguous United States. It is an dioecious annual species found in sandy areas, near riverbeds, lakes, and fields. It is native to the central or south Great Plains, extending from Texas to South Dakota, and was introduced to other areas. This flowering plant can grow up to 2 meters (6.6 feet) in height.
