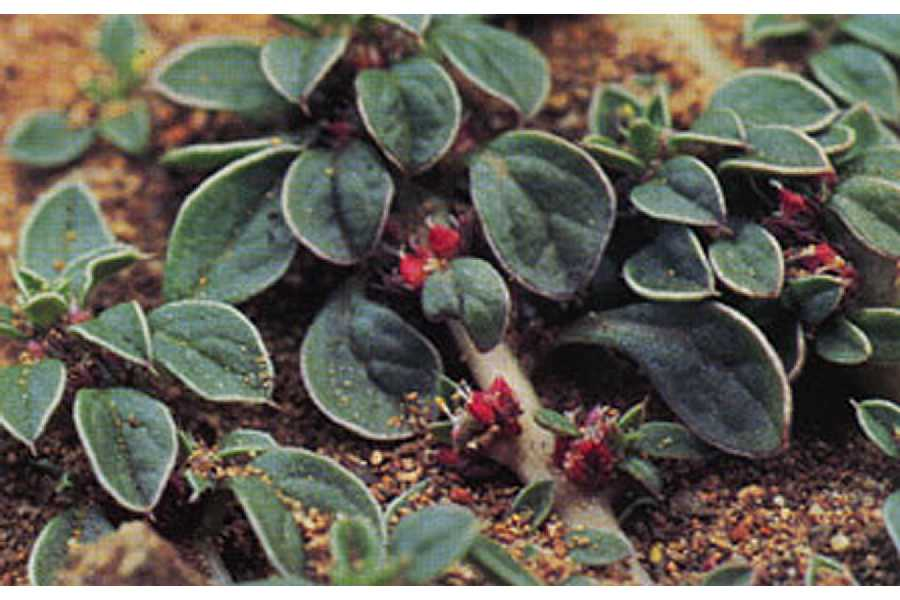

Conservation status
- Apparently Secure (NatureServe)

Scientific classification
- Kingdom: Plantae
- Clade: Tracheophytes
- Clade: Angiosperms
- Clade: Eudicots
- Order: Caryophyllales
- Family: Amaranthaceae
- Genus: Amaranthus
- Species: A. californicus

Binomial name
- Amaranthus californicus (Moq.) S.Wats.

= Amaranthus californicus =

Species of flowering plant

Amaranthus californicus is a species of flowering plant in the amaranth family known as California amaranth. It is a glabrous monoecious annual that is native to most of the western United States and Canada. The plant grows from 10 to 50 cm (3.9 to 19.7 in) in length. It is found in moist flats or near bodies of water, and it blooms from summer to fall.
