= Amaranthus floridanus =

Florida amaranth

Conservation status
- Possibly Extinct (NatureServe)

Scientific classification
- Kingdom: Plantae
- Clade: Tracheophytes
- Clade: Angiosperms
- Clade: Eudicots
- Order: Caryophyllales
- Family: Amaranthaceae
- Genus: Amaranthus
- Species: A. floridanus

Binomial name
- Amaranthus floridanus (S.Watson) Sauer

Species of flowering plant

Amaranthus floridanus, the Florida amaranth, is a rare species of flowering plant endemic to Florida.

== Description ==
Amaranthus floridanus flowers from late spring to fall and can grow up to 1.5 metres (4.9 ft) in height.

== Habitat ==
It is recorded as growing in moist places, near dunes, swamps, marshes, or in disturbed habitats.

== Conservation ==
Until 2024, the species had not been seen since the 1980s and there was growing doubt that it was an extant species. In 2024, a biologist spotted a lone male plant growing in a restaurant parking lot in Sarasota County, which has since been extirpated.

The species, if it still exists, is threatened by habitat loss to coastal development, invasive species, sea level rise, and hurricanes. It is possible that the species still persists in some locales and has simply been overlooked, so it is critical to survey locales it was historically recorded in and locations with appropriate habitat.
