= Amaranthus watsonii =

Scientific classification
- Kingdom: Plantae
- Clade: Tracheophytes
- Clade: Angiosperms
- Clade: Eudicots
- Order: Caryophyllales
- Family: Amaranthaceae
- Genus: Amaranthus
- Species: A. watsonii

Binomial name
- Amaranthus watsonii Standl.

Synonyms
- Amaranthus torreyi (A.Gray) Benth. ex S.Watson; Amblogyna torreyi A.Gray; Sarratia berlandieri var. emarginata Torr.

Species of flowering plant

Amaranthus watsonii is a species of amaranth known by the common name Watson's amaranth. It is native to the southwestern United States and northern Mexico, where it grows in sandy places such as deserts and beaches, and disturbed areas. It is also known as a rare introduced species in parts of Europe. This is an erect annual herb producing a glandular hairy stem to a maximum height of about a meter. The leaves are generally oval-shaped and up to 8 centimeters long, with a petiole of up to 9 centimeters. The species is dioecious, with male and female individuals producing different types of flowers. The inflorescence is a long spike cluster of flowers interspersed with spiny green glandular bracts. The fruit is a smooth capsule about 2 millimeters long that snaps in half to reveal a small shiny reddish black seed.
