= Amaranthus interruptus =

Scientific classification
- Kingdom: Plantae
- Clade: Tracheophytes
- Clade: Angiosperms
- Clade: Eudicots
- Order: Caryophyllales
- Family: Amaranthaceae
- Genus: Amaranthus
- Species: A. interruptus

Binomial name
- Amaranthus interruptus R.Br.

Synonyms
- Amaranthus lancifolius Delile ex Moq.; Amaranthus lineatus R.Br.; Amaranthus spathulatus Desf. ex Moq.; Euxolus interruptus (R.Br.) Moq.; Euxolus lineatus (R.Br.) Moq.

Species of plant

Amaranthus interruptus, commonly known as the native amaranth, is a species of flowering plant in the family Amaranthaceae. It was first described by Robert Brown in 1810.

== Distribution ==
Amaranthus interruptus is native to the Lesser Sunda Islands, New Guinea, the Solomon Islands, and the Australian states and territories of Western Australia, the Northern Territory, South Australia and Queensland. It has been introduced to the Marquesas Islands, New Caledonia and the Society Islands. It is an annual and grows primarily in the seasonally dry tropical biome. Collections from New Guinea, the Bismarck Archipelago and the Solomon Islands have also been interpreted as temporary introductions from Australia. The species was recorded on Jarvis Island in the central Pacific, where it was probably introduced between 1924 and 1935 and was still present in 1964.

== Description ==
Amaranthus interruptus is a monoecious plant. Its flowers have five tepals and three to five stamens, and the fruit is an indehiscent utricle, strongly wrinkled in its lower, seed-bearing half and smoother above. The seeds of Australian plants average about 1 mm in their longest diameter. Plants collected on Jarvis Island grow to about 20 cm tall, with leaves mostly 5–10 mm long and shiny, reddish-black seeds about 0.75 mm long; they are lower-growing than Australian plants, with smaller leaves, more compact inflorescences and smaller seeds.
