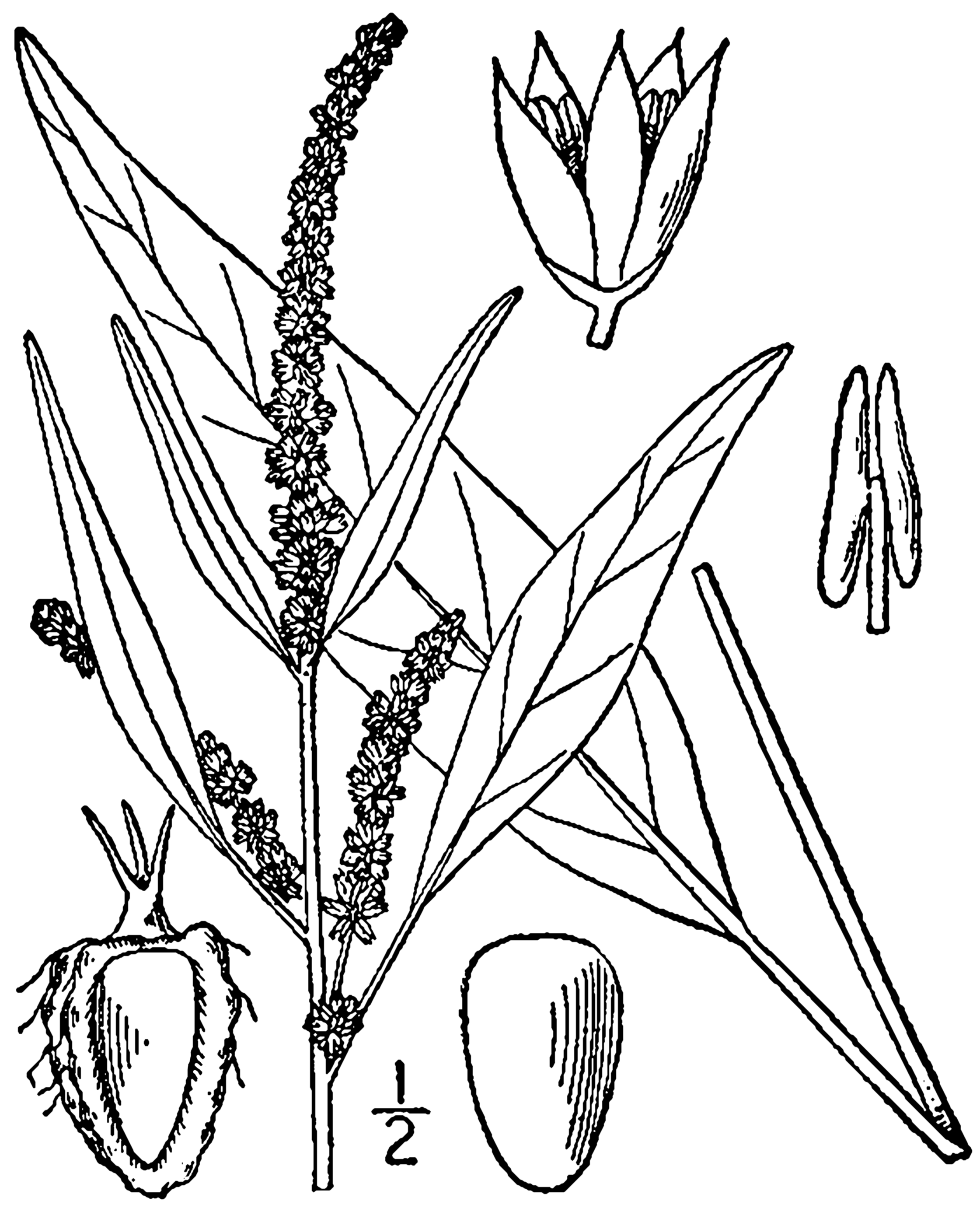
- Amaranthus cannabinus

Scientific classification
- Kingdom: Plantae
- Clade: Tracheophytes
- Clade: Angiosperms
- Clade: Eudicots
- Order: Caryophyllales
- Family: Amaranthaceae
- Genus: Amaranthus
- Species: A. cannabinus

Binomial name
- Amaranthus cannabinus L

= Amaranthus cannabinus =

Salt-marsh water-hemp

Species of flowering plant

Amaranthus cannabinus is a plant species also known as salt marsh water hemp or salt marsh pigweed. It is a herbaceous perennial found in most of the eastern United States. It grows from 1 to 3 m in height. It is often mistaken for Amaranthus australis.
