= Amaranthus mitchellii =

Scientific classification
- Kingdom: Plantae
- Clade: Tracheophytes
- Clade: Angiosperms
- Clade: Eudicots
- Order: Caryophyllales
- Family: Amaranthaceae
- Genus: Amaranthus
- Species: A. mitchellii

Binomial name
- Amaranthus mitchellii Benth.

Species of flowering plant

Amaranthus mitchellii is commonly known as Mitchell's amaranth or boggabri weed. It is from the family Amaranthaceae. It is a generally useful plant and is said to be "edible".

== Care and habitats ==
These plants require sandy and moist soil and full sunlight.

== Location ==
The plant is found mainly in Australia, in Queensland and Victoria.

== Characteristics ==
As an annual, it grows up to 0.5 m in height. It is pollinated by wind and is self-fertile.

== Uses ==
Amaranthus mitchellii is edible, and can be used as dye. Germination is very quick.
