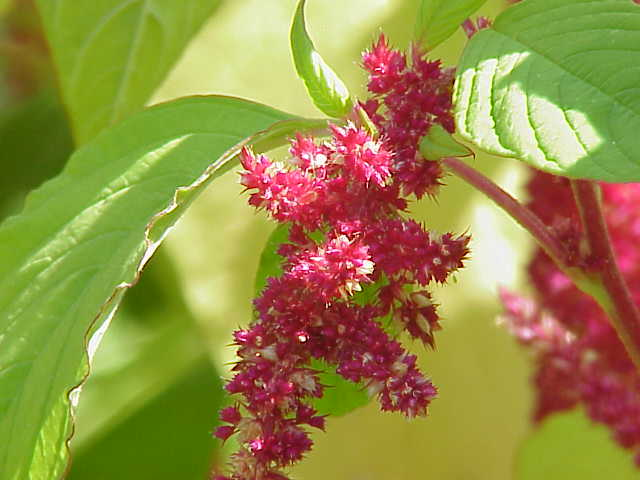
- Amaranthus tricolor

Scientific classification
- Kingdom: Plantae
- Clade: Tracheophytes
- Clade: Angiosperms
- Clade: Eudicots
- Order: Caryophyllales
- Family: Amaranthaceae
- Subfamily: Amaranthoideae
- Genus: Amaranthus; L.

Species
- See text

= Amaranth =

Genus of plants

Amaranthus is a genus of plants commonly known as amaranths. Some species are known by variants of the common name "pigweed". Some members are annual and others are perennial. The plant can grow from 1 to 2.5 metres (3 to 8 feet) tall with a succulent, hollow stem. Parts of the plant vary from green to reddish. Catkin-like cymes of densely packed flowers grow in the summer or fall.

There are 75 recognized species in the genus, some monoecious and some dioecious. The name amaranth was originally applied to the closely related genus Celosia. Amaranthus is cosmopolitan in tropical regions. Some species are cultivated as leaf vegetables, pseudocereals (with amaranth grain being collected), and ornamental plants.

== Description ==
Amaranth is a herbaceous plant or shrub that is either annual or perennial across the genus. The plant has a primary root with deeper spreading secondary fibrous root structures. Amaranths contain concentric rings of vascular bundles and fix carbon efficiently with a C4 photosynthetic pathway. Amaranth can grow from 1 to 2.5 metres (3 to 8 feet) tall with a cylindrical, succulent, fibrous stem that is hollow with grooves and bracteoles when mature varies in flower, leaf, and stem color with a range of striking pigments from the spectrum of maroon to crimson. The leaves are approximately 6.5–15 centimetres (2 1/2–6 inches) and of oval or elliptical shape that are either opposite or alternate across species, although most are whole and simple with entire margins.

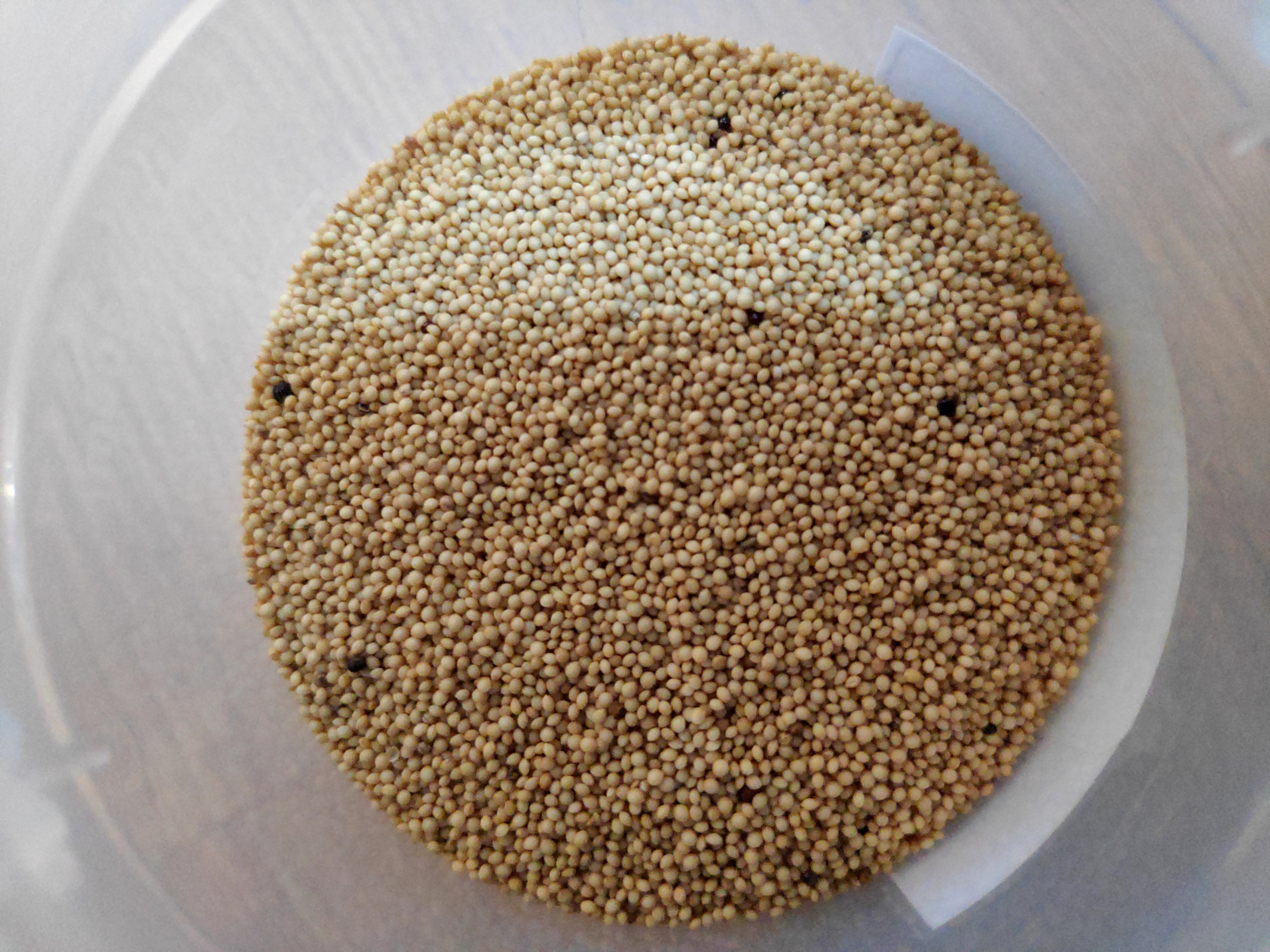
Amaranth grain

Catkin-like cymes of densely packed flowers grow in the summer or fall. The inflorescences are in the form a large panicle that varies from terminal to axial, color, and sex. The tassel of fluorescence is either erect or bent and varies in width and length between species. The flowers are radially symmetric and either bisexual or unisexual with very small, bristly perianth and pointy bracts. The flowers vary interspecifically from the presence of 3 or 5 tepals and stamens, whereas a 7-porate pollen grain structure remains consistent across the family.

Species in this genus are either monoecious (e.g. A. hybridus,) or dioecious (e.g. A. palmeri). The fruits are in the form of capsules referred to as a unilocular pixdio that opens at maturity. The top (operculum) of the capsule releases the urn that contains the seed. The seeds are circular, 1 to 1.5 millimeters in diameter and range in color with a shiny, smooth seed coat. The panicle is harvested 200 days after cultivation with approximately 1,000 to 3,000 seeds harvested per gram.

== Taxonomy ==
Amaranthus shows a wide variety of morphological diversity among and even within certain species. Amaranthus is part of the Amaranthaceae that is part of the larger grouping of the Carophyllales. Although the family (Amaranthaceae) is distinctive, the genus has few distinguishing characters among the 75 species present across six continents. This complicates taxonomy and Amaranthus has generally been considered among systematists as a "difficult" genus and to hybridize often.

In 1955, Sauer classified the genus into two subgenera, differentiating only between monoecious and dioecious species: Acnida (L.) Aellen ex K.R. Robertson and Amaranthus. Although this classification was widely accepted, further infrageneric classification was (and still is) needed to differentiate this widely diverse group. Mosyakin and Robertson 1996 later divided into three subgenera: Acnida, Amaranthus, and Albersia. The support for the addition of the subdivision Albersia because of its indehiscent fruits coupled with three elliptic to linear tepals to be exclusive characters to members of this subgenus. The classification of these groups are further supported with a combination of floral characters, reproductive strategies, geographic distribution, and molecular evidence.

The phylogenies of Amaranthus using maximum parsimony and Bayesian analysis of nuclear and chloroplast genes suggest five groups within the genus: Dioecious/Pumilus clade; Hybridus clade; Galapagos (three clades); Eurasian + South African + Australian (ESA) clade; ESA + South American clade (with South American samples forming an evolutionary grade).

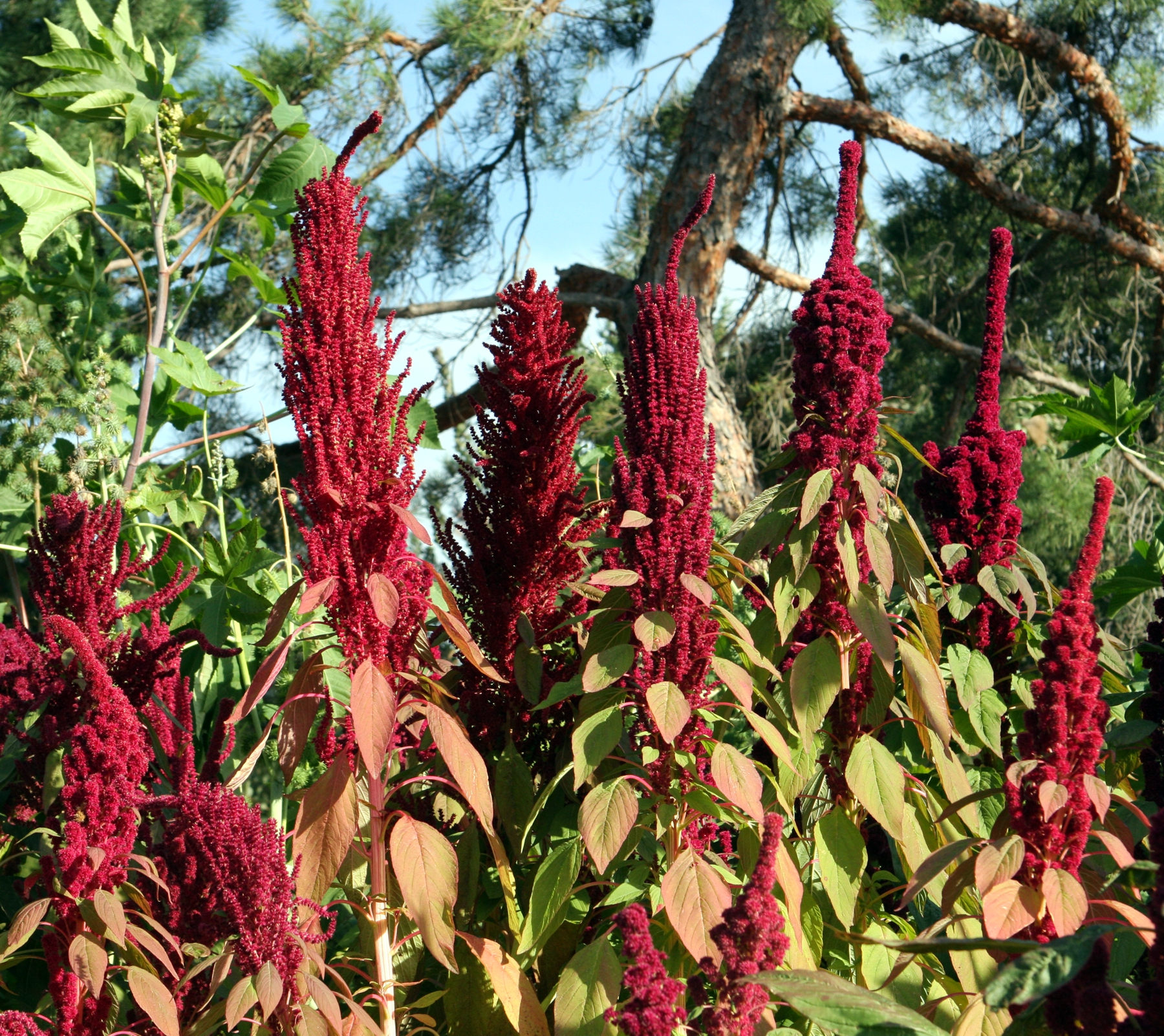
A. hypochondriacus

Amaranthus includes three recognised subgenera and 75 species, although species numbers are questionable due to hybridisation and species concepts. Infrageneric classification focuses on inflorescence, flower characters and whether a species is monoecious/dioecious, as in the Sauer (1955) suggested classification. Bracteole morphology present on the stem is used for taxonomic classification of Amaranth. Wild species have longer bracteoles compared to cultivated species. A modified infrageneric classification of Amaranthus includes three subgenera: Acnida, Amaranthus, and Albersia, with the taxonomy further differentiated by sections within each of the subgenera. According to one source, 10 species are dioecious and native to North America, while the rest are monoecious and cosmopolitan.

All three cultivated grain amaranth species likely arose from A. hybridus. Though it was once uncertain whether grain amaranths evolved once, then split into their modern subgroups, or multiple times independently, evidence now supports separate domestication events in Central America and South America. A. cruentus and A. hypochondriacus are native to Central America, whereas A. caudatus originates in South America.

=== Species ===
Species include:

- Amaranthus acanthochiton – greenstripe
- Amaranthus acutilobus – a synonym of Amaranthus viridis
- Amaranthus albus – white pigweed, tumble pigweed
- Amaranthus anderssonii
- Amaranthus arenicola – sandhill amaranth
- Amaranthus australis – southern amaranth
- Amaranthus bigelovii – Bigelow's amaranth
- Amaranthus blitoides – mat amaranth, prostrate amaranth, prostrate pigweed
- Amaranthus blitum – purple amaranth
- †Amaranthus brownii – Brown's amaranth
- Amaranthus californicus – California amaranth, California pigweed
- Amaranthus cannabinus – tidal-marsh amaranth
- Amaranthus caudatus – love-lies-bleeding, pendant amaranth, tassel flower, quilete
- Amaranthus chihuahuensis – Chihuahuan amaranth
- Amaranthus crassipes – spreading amaranth
- Amaranthus crispus – crispleaf amaranth
- Amaranthus cruentus – purple amaranth, red amaranth, Mexican grain amaranth
- Amaranthus deflexus – large-fruit amaranth
- Amaranthus dubius – spleen amaranth, khada sag
- Amaranthus fimbriatus – fringed amaranth, fringed pigweed
- Amaranthus floridanus – Florida amaranth
- Amaranthus furcatus
- Amaranthus graecizans
- Amaranthus grandiflorus
- Amaranthus greggii – Gregg's amaranth
- Amaranthus hybridus – smooth amaranth, smooth pigweed, red amaranth
- Amaranthus hypochondriacus – Prince-of-Wales feather, prince's feather
- Amaranthus interruptus – Australian amaranth
- Amaranthus minimus
- Amaranthus mitchellii
- Amaranthus muricatus – African amaranth
- Amaranthus obcordatus – Trans-Pecos amaranth
- Amaranthus palmeri – Palmer's amaranth, Palmer pigweed, careless weed
- Amaranthus polygonoides – tropical amaranth
- Amaranthus powellii – green amaranth, Powell amaranth, Powell pigweed
- Amaranthus pringlei – Pringle's amaranth
- Amaranthus pumilus – seaside amaranth
- Amaranthus quitensis - Mucronate Amaranth
- Amaranthus retroflexus – red-root amaranth, redroot pigweed, common amaranth
- Amaranthus saradhiana - purpal stem amaranth, green leaf amaranth
- Amaranthus scleranthoides – variously Amaranthus sclerantoides
- Amaranthus scleropoides – bone-bract amaranth
- Amaranthus spinosus – spiny amaranth, prickly amaranth, thorny amaranth
- Amaranthus standleyanus
- Amaranthus thunbergii – Thunberg's amaranth
- Amaranthus torreyi – Torrey's amaranth
- Amaranthus tricolor – Joseph's-coat
- Amaranthus tuberculatus – rough-fruit amaranth, tall waterhemp
- Amaranthus viridis – slender amaranth, green amaranth
- Amaranthus watsonii – Watson's amaranth
- Amaranthus wrightii – Wright's amaranth

== Names and etymology ==
The word amaranth derives from Ancient Greek ἀμάραντος (amárantos), meaning 'unfading', a name used across cultures. Its development is associated with the Greek word for 'flower', ἄνθος (ánthos), giving rise to the idea of the 'unfading flower'. Amarant is an archaic variant of the name.

The botanical name Amaranthus likewise comes from the Ancient Greek ἀμάραντος. The noun is formed from the privative prefix ἀ- (a-), meaning 'without', and the verb μαραίνω (maraínō), meaning 'to consume' or 'to exhaust'. Classical references to the plant appear in the works of Dioscorides (Book 3, section 9; Book 4, sections 55 and 57).

The name amaranth was first applied in Europe to the related genus Celosia. At the time, plants of the genus Amaranthus were not yet known in Europe. Amaranthus and Celosia share long-lasting dried flowers, which contributed to the transfer of the name.

The Latin form amaranthus, which includes the letter h, arose from an erroneous association with the Greek word ἄνθος (anthos), meaning 'flower'. This element appears in the names of many plants, such as Agapanthus, and influenced later botanical spelling.

In the languages of Indigenous peoples who cultivated amaranth in the Americas since ancient times, the plant is known by a variety of names. In Nahuatl, it is called huauhtli. In Quechua, it is known as kiwicha and ataĉo. In Maya, it is called tez or xtes. Additional names include ahparie in the Purépecha language, wa've in Huichol, and guegui in the Tarahumara.

== Distribution and habitat ==
The genus most likely originated in Central America. The native range of the genus is cosmopolitan in tropical regions. It is found in elevations ranging from lowlands to mountain ranges such as the Himalayas.

== Ecology ==
Amaranth weed species have an extended period of germination, rapid growth, and high rates of seed production. Farmers have considered them problematic since the mid-1990s, partially due to the reduction in tillage and herbicide use, as well as the evolution of herbicide resistance in several species. In the United States and Canada, nine species of Amaranthus are considered invasive and noxious weeds: A. albus, A. blitoides, A. hybridus, A. palmeri, A. powellii, A. retroflexus, A. spinosus, A. tuberculatus, and A. viridis.

A new herbicide-resistant strain of A. palmeri has appeared; it is glyphosate-resistant and so cannot be killed by herbicides using the chemical. Also, this plant can survive in tough conditions. A. palmeri (Palmer amaranth) causes the greatest reduction in soybean yields and has the potential to reduce yields by 17–68% in field experiments. According to one source, A. palmeri is among the "top five most troublesome weeds" in the southeast of the U.S. and has already evolved resistances to dinitroaniline herbicides and acetolactate synthase inhibitors. This makes the proper identification of Amaranthus species at the seedling stage essential for agriculturalists. Proper weed control needs to be applied before the species successfully colonizes in the crop field and causes significant yield reductions.

An evolutionary lineage of around 90 species within the genus has acquired the C_{4} carbon fixation pathway, which increases their photosynthetic efficiency. This probably occurred in the Miocene.

Amaranths are recorded as food plants for some Lepidoptera (butterfly and moth) species including the nutmeg moth and various case-bearer moths of the genus Coleophora: C. amaranthella, C. enchorda (feeds exclusively on Amaranthus), C. immortalis (feeds exclusively on Amaranthus), C. lineapulvella, and C. versurella (recorded on A. spinosus).

== Conservation ==
Amaranthus pumilus (seabeach amaranth) has been listed as an endangered species in the U.S. since 1993.

== Cultivation ==
Amaranth grain has been found in Antofagasta de la Sierra Department, Catamarca, in the southern Puna desert of northern Argentina dating from 4,500 years ago, with evidence suggesting earlier use. Archeological digs unearthed A. cruentus seeds in a cave in Tehuacán, Mexico that dated to 6,000 years before present, while other digs in the same caves found A. hypochondriacus seeds dating to 1,500 years before present. Ancient amaranth grains still used include A. caudatus, A. cruentus, and A. hypochondriacus. Evidence from single-nucleotide polymorphisms and chromosome structure supports A. hypochondriacus as the common ancestor of the three grain species.

In pre-Hispanic times, amaranth was cultivated by the Aztec and their tributary communities in a quantity very similar to maize. Known to the Aztecs as huāuhtli, amaranth is thought to have represented up to 80% of their energy consumption before the Spanish conquest.

Amaranth has been proposed as an inexpensive native crop that could be cultivated by indigenous people in rural areas for several reasons:

- A small amount of seed plants a large area (seeding rate 1 kg/ha).
- Yields are high compared to the seeding rate: 1,000 kg or more per hectare.
- It is easily harvested and easily processed, post harvest, as there are no hulls to remove.
- Its seeds are a source of protein.
- It has rich content of the dietary minerals, calcium, magnesium, phosphorus, and potassium.
- In cooked and edible forms, amaranth retains adequate content of several dietary minerals.
- It grows fast and, in three cultivated species, the large seedheads can weigh up to 1 kg and contain a half-million small seeds.

In the U.S., the amaranth crop is mostly used for seed production. Most amaranth in American food products starts as a ground flour, blended with wheat or other flours to create cereals, crackers, cookies, bread or other baked products. Despite utilization studies showing that amaranth can be blended with other flours at levels above 50% without affecting functional properties or taste, most commercial products use amaranth only as a minor portion of their ingredients despite them being marketed as "amaranth" products.

== Potential adverse effects ==
Amaranth grain contains phytochemicals that are not defined as nutrients and may be antinutrient factors, such as polyphenols, saponins, tannins, and oxalates. These compounds are reduced in content and antinutrient effect by cooking.

The stalks may have sharp spines that need to be removed before consumption.

== Uses ==
All parts of the plant are considered edible. It is well established as a highly nutritious and stress-tolerant crop well-suited for climate change-related stress if cultivated with agrivoltaics. Its high oxalic content may be partially offset by its yield of calcium.

The genus also contains several well-known ornamental plants such as A. caudatus and A. hypochondriacus.

=== Nutrition ===
Amaranth grain, uncooked
Nutritional value per 100 g (3.5 oz)
- Energy: 1,554 kJ (371 kcal)
- Carbohydrates: 65.25 g
- Starch: 57.27 g
- Sugars: 1.69 g
- Dietary fiber: 6.7 g
- Fat: 7.02 g
- Saturated: 1.459 g
- Monounsaturated: 1.685 g
- Polyunsaturated: 2.778 g
- Protein: 13.56 g
Amino acids
Tryptophan	0.181 g
Threonine	0.558 g
Isoleucine	0.582 g
Leucine	0.879 g
Lysine	0.747 g
Methionine	0.226 g
Cystine	0.191 g
Phenylalanine	0.542 g
Tyrosine	0.329 g
Valine	0.679 g
Arginine	1.060 g
Histidine	0.389 g
Alanine	0.799 g
Aspartic acid	1.261 g
Glutamic acid	2.259 g
Glycine	1.636 g
Proline	0.698 g
Serine	1.148 g
Vitamins and minerals
Vitamins	Quantity %DV^{†}
Thiamine (B1)	10% 0.116 mg
Riboflavin (B2)	15% 0.2 mg
Niacin (B3)	6% 0.923 mg
Pantothenic acid (B5)	29% 1.457 mg
Vitamin B6	35% 0.591 mg
Folate (B9)	21% 82 μg
Vitamin C	5% 4.2 mg
Vitamin E	8% 1.19 mg
Minerals	Quantity %DV^{†}
Calcium	12% 159 mg
Iron	42% 7.61 mg
Magnesium	59% 248 mg
Manganese	145% 3.333 mg
Phosphorus	45% 557 mg
Potassium	17% 508 mg
Sodium	0% 4 mg
Zinc	26% 2.87 mg
- Other constituents: Quantity
- Water: 11.3 g
- Selenium: 18.7 µg
- Full Link to USDA FoodData Central entry
- ^{†}Percentages estimated using US recommendations for adults, except for potassium, which is estimated based on expert recommendation from the National Academies.

Amaranth grain, Cooked
Nutritional value per 100 g (3.5 oz)
- Energy: 429 kJ (103 kcal)
- Carbohydrates: 18.7 g
- Starch: 16.2 g
- Dietary fiber: 2.1 g
- Fat: 1.58 g
- Protein: 3.8 g
Vitamins and minerals
Vitamins	Quantity %DV^{†}
Thiamine (B1)	1% 0.015 mg
Riboflavin (B2)	2% 0.022 mg
Niacin (B3)	1% 0.235 mg
Pantothenic acid (B5)	29% 1.457 mg
Vitamin B6	7% 0.113 mg
Folate (B9)	6% 22 μg
Vitamin E	6% 0.88 mg
Minerals	Quantity %DV^{†}
Calcium	4% 47 mg
Iron	12% 2.1 mg
Magnesium	15% 65 mg
Manganese	37% 0.854 mg
Phosphorus	12% 148 mg
Potassium	5% 135 mg
Sodium	0% 6 mg
Zinc	8% 0.86 mg
- Other constituents: Quantity
- Water: 75.2 g
- Selenium: 5.5 µg
- Full Link to USDA FoodData Central entry
- ^{†}Percentages estimated using US recommendations for adults, except for potassium, which is estimated based on expert recommendation from the National Academies.

Uncooked amaranth grain by weight is 11% water, 65% carbohydrates (including 7% dietary fiber), 14% protein, and 7% fat. A 100-gram (3 1/2-ounce) reference serving of uncooked amaranth grain provides 1,550 kilojoules (371 kilocalories) of food energy, and is a rich source (20% or more of the Daily Value, DV) of protein, dietary fiber, pantothenic acid, vitamin B6, folate, and several dietary minerals. Uncooked amaranth is particularly rich in manganese (159% DV), phosphorus (80% DV), magnesium (70% DV), iron (59% DV), and selenium (34% DV). Amaranth has a high oxalate content. Cooking leads to an apparent substantial decrease in nutritional value, though this is mainly due to an increase in water content to 75% by weight.

Raw and cooked amaranth leaves are rich sources of vitamin A, vitamin C, calcium, and manganese, with moderate levels of folate, iron, magnesium, and potassium.

Amaranth does not contain gluten.

=== Seed ===
Interest in amaranth seeds (especially A. cruentus and A. hypochondriacus) revived in the 1970s during the health movement. It was recovered in Mexico from wild varieties.

Amaranth and its relative quinoa are considered pseudocereals because of their similarities to cereals in flavor and cooking. The grain can be ground into a flour for use like other grain flours. It can be popped like popcorn or flaked like oatmeal.

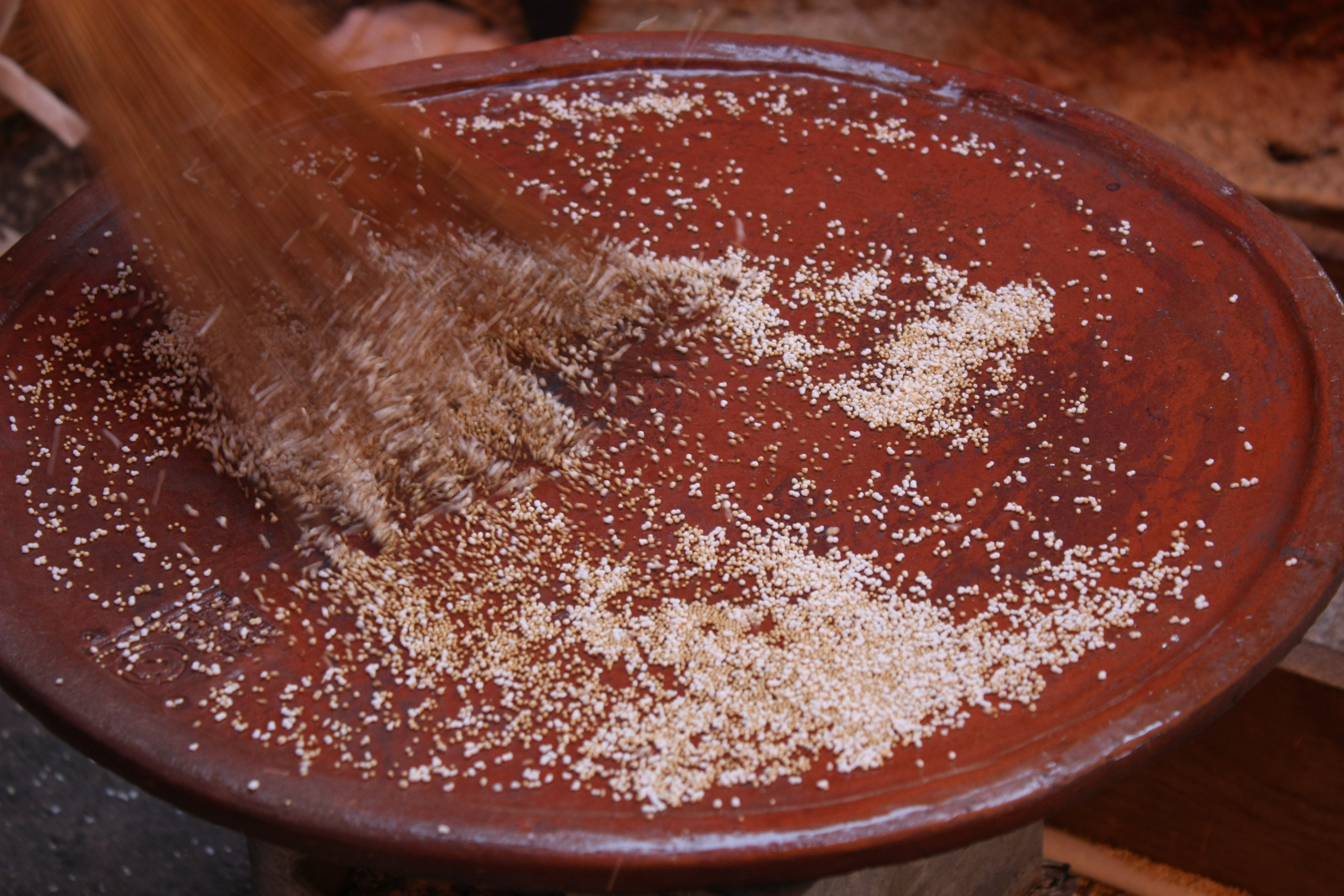
Amaranth being roasted in a comal

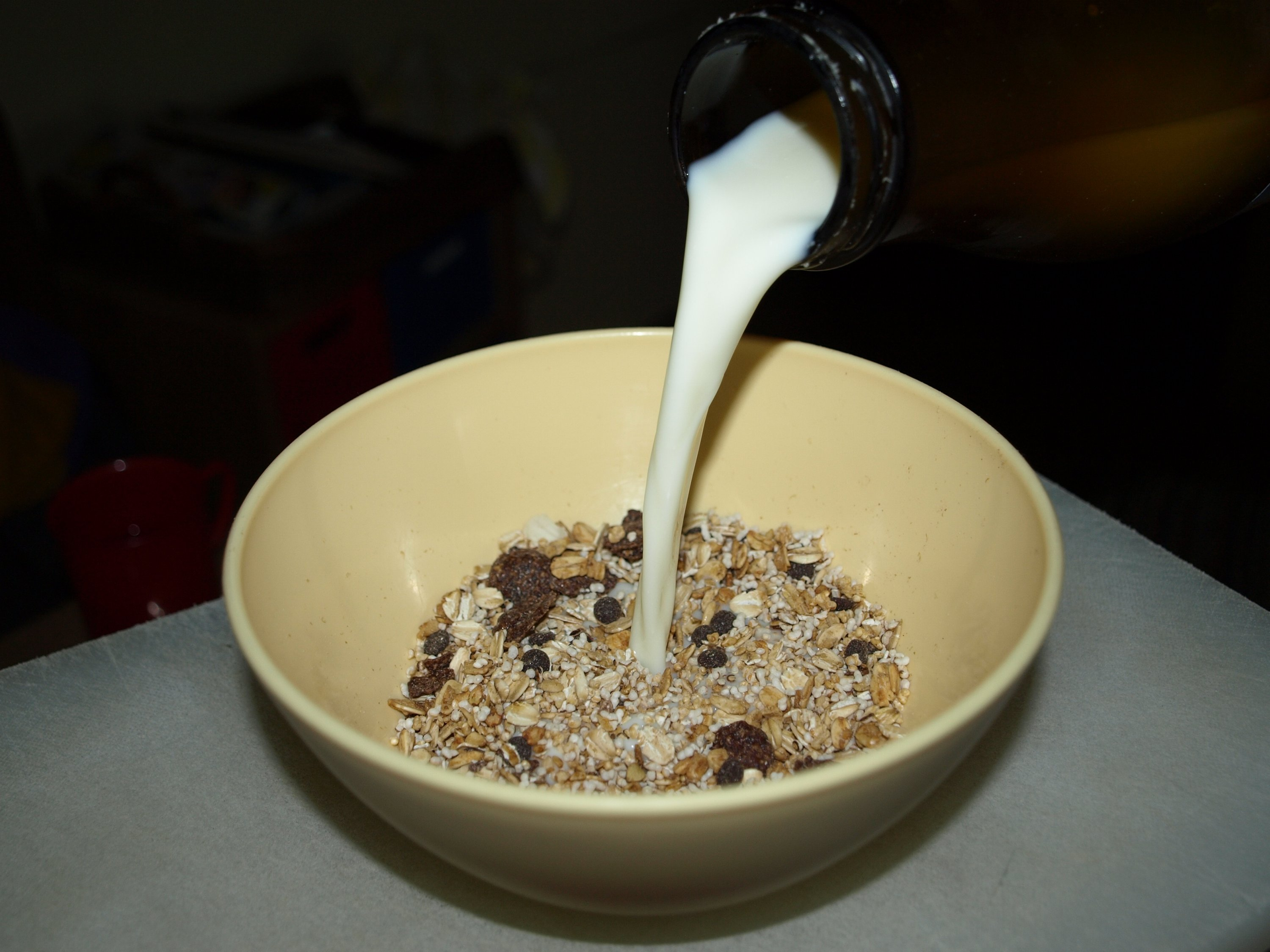
Amaranth muesli mix

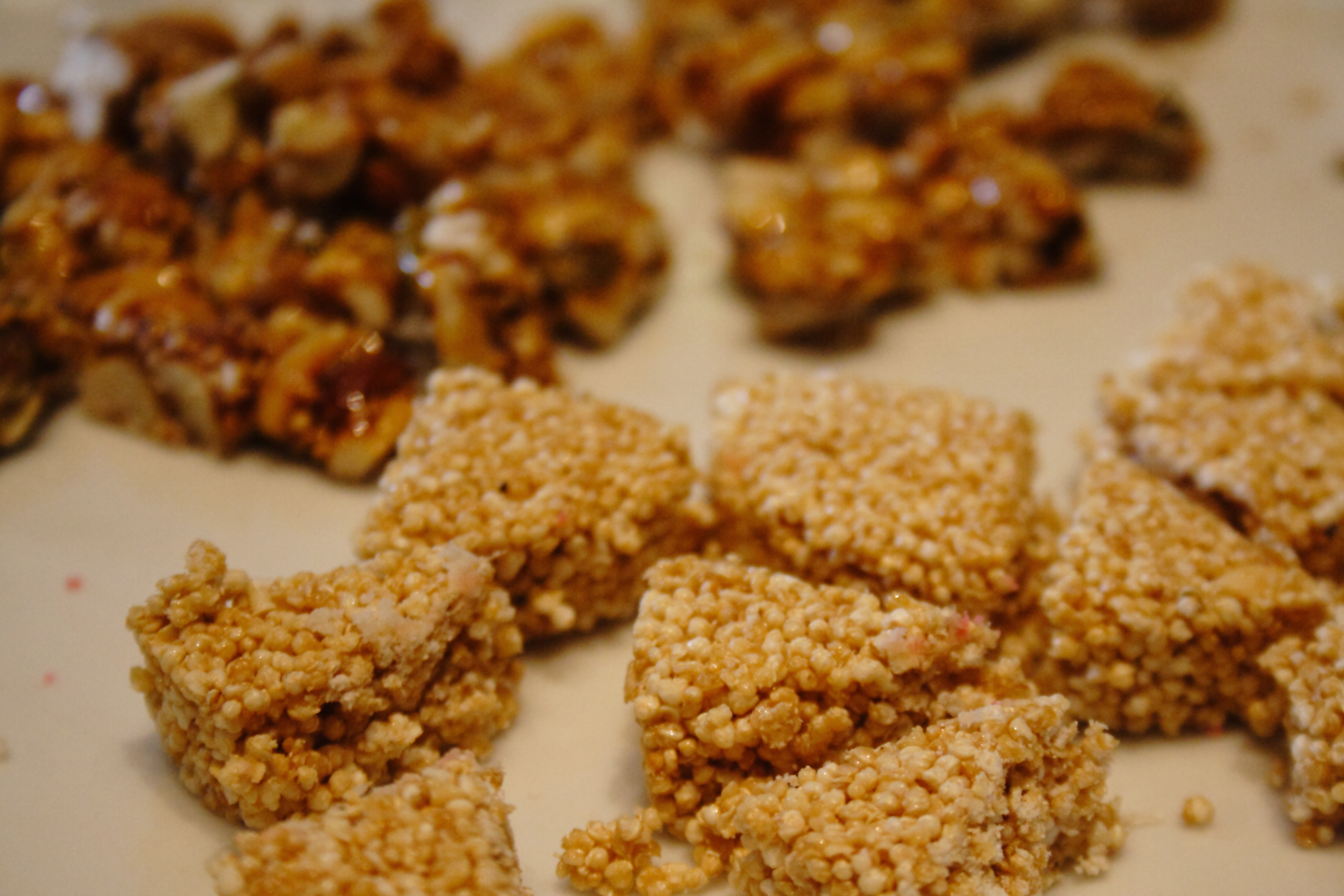
Alegría, traditional Mexican candy made with amaranth

=== Leaves, roots, and stems ===
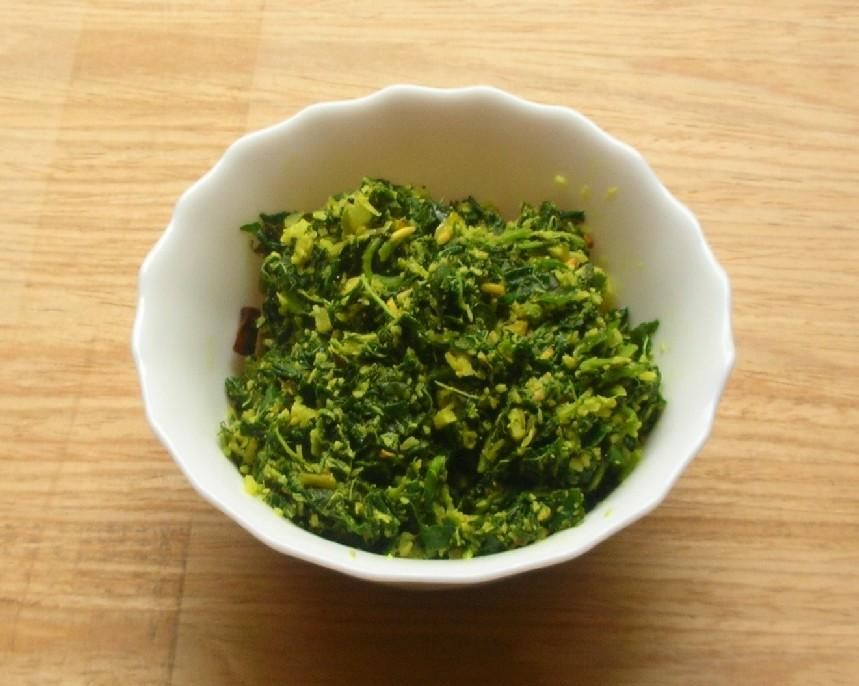
Southern Kerala-style traditional Thoran made with Cheera (amaranth) leaves

Amaranth species are cultivated and consumed as a leaf vegetable in many parts of the world.

In Brazil, green amaranth is often consumed with rice and beans. In the Caribbean, the leaves are sautéed or used in a soup called Callaloo, which is also the local name for the amaranth plant.

In Greece, A. blitum is boiled and served like a salad.

Four Amaranthus species are documented as cultivated vegetables in eastern Asia: A. cruentus, A. blitum, A. dubius, and A. tricolor. In India, the greens can be prepared as curry, stir fry, saag, and thoran. In China, the leaves and stems are used as a stir-fry vegetable or in soups. In Vietnam, it is used to make soup, mostly popularly A. tricolor and A. viridis.

A traditional food plant in Africa, amaranth has the potential to improve nutrition, boost food security, foster rural development and support sustainable land care.

=== Oil ===
Making up about 5% of the total fatty acids of amaranth, squalene is extracted as a vegetable-based alternative to the more expensive shark oil for use in dietary supplements and cosmetics.

=== Dyes ===
The flowers of the 'Hopi Red Dye' amaranth were used by the Hopi (a tribe in the western U.S.) as the source of a deep red dye. A synthetic dye was named "amaranth" for its similarity in color to the natural amaranth pigments known as betalains. This synthetic dye is also known as Red No. 2 in North America and E123 in the European Union.

== In culture ==
Amaranth's cosmopolitan distribution has led some to cite it as supporting pre-Columbian contact between Old and New World human cultures. The earliest archeological evidence for amaranth in the Old World is in Narhan, India, dated to 1000–800 BCE.

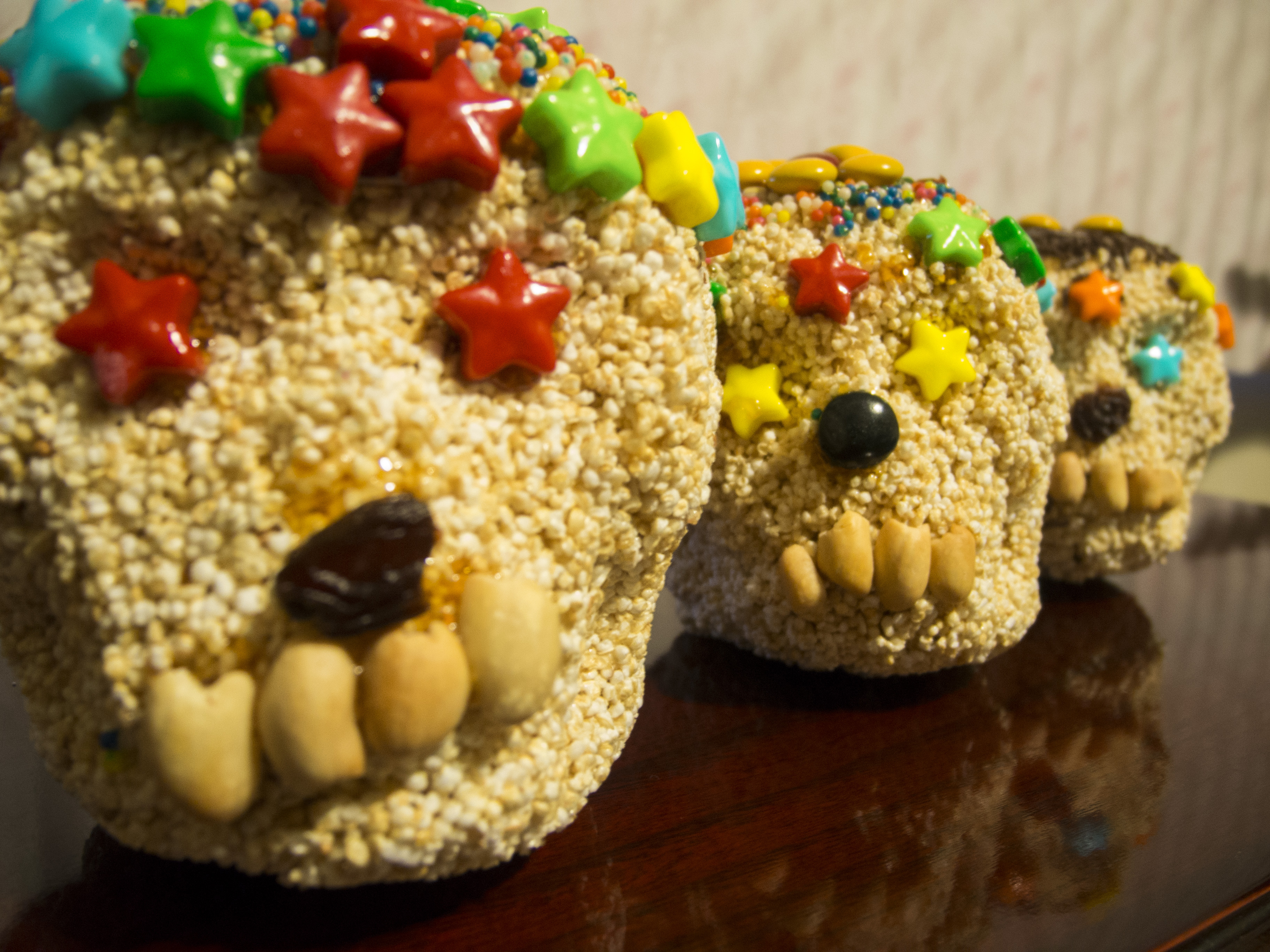
Skull shapes made of amaranth and honey for Day of the Dead in Mexico

In the 16th century, Dominican friar Diego Durán described the festivities for the Aztec god Huitzilopochtli. The Aztec month of Panquetzaliztli (7 December to 26 December) was dedicated to Huitzilopochtli. People decorated their homes and trees with paper flags; ritual races, processions, dances, songs, prayers, and finally human sacrifices were held. This was one of the more important Aztec festivals, and the people prepared for the whole month. They fasted or ate very little; a statue of the god was made out of amaranth seeds and honey, and at the end of the month, it was cut into small pieces so everybody could eat a piece of the god. After the Spanish conquest, cultivation of amaranth was outlawed, while some of the festivities were subsumed into the Christmas celebration. Another important use of amaranth throughout Mesoamerica was in ritual drinks and foods. To this day, amaranth grains are toasted much like popcorn and mixed with honey, molasses, or chocolate to make a treat called alegría, meaning "joy" in Spanish.

Amaranth is associated with longevity and, poetically, with death and immortality. The immortality symbolism is linked to the persistence of its calyx, which does not readily wither; for this reason, some species of amaranth are used in dry bouquets. Amaranth garlands were used in the mourning of Achilles.

John Milton's Paradise Lost portrays a showy amaranth in the Garden of Eden, "remov'd from Heav'n" when it blossoms because the flowers "shade the fountain of life". He describes amaranth as "immortal" in reference to the flowers that generally do not wither and retain bright reddish tones of color, even when deceased.

== Gallery ==
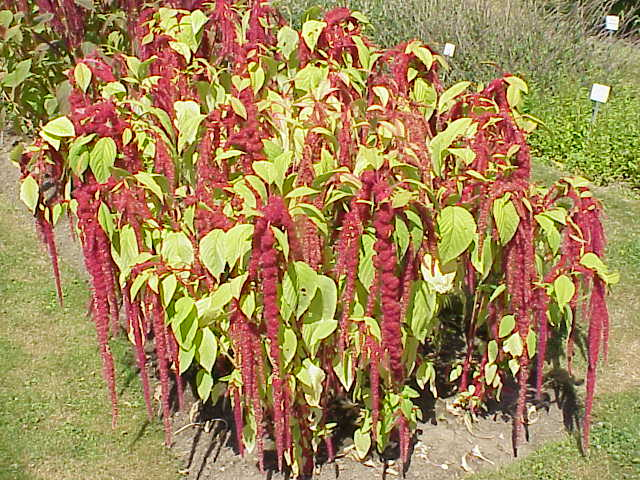
Love-lies-bleeding (A. caudatus)

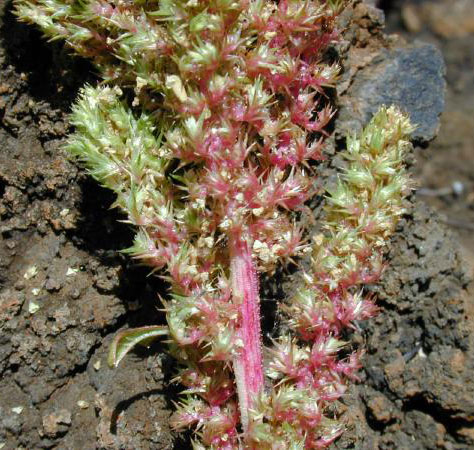
Green amaranth (A. hybridus)

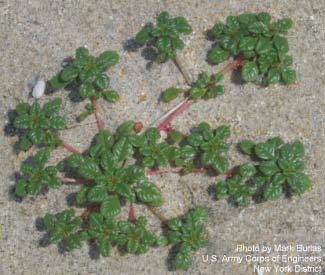
Seabeach amaranth (A. pumilus)

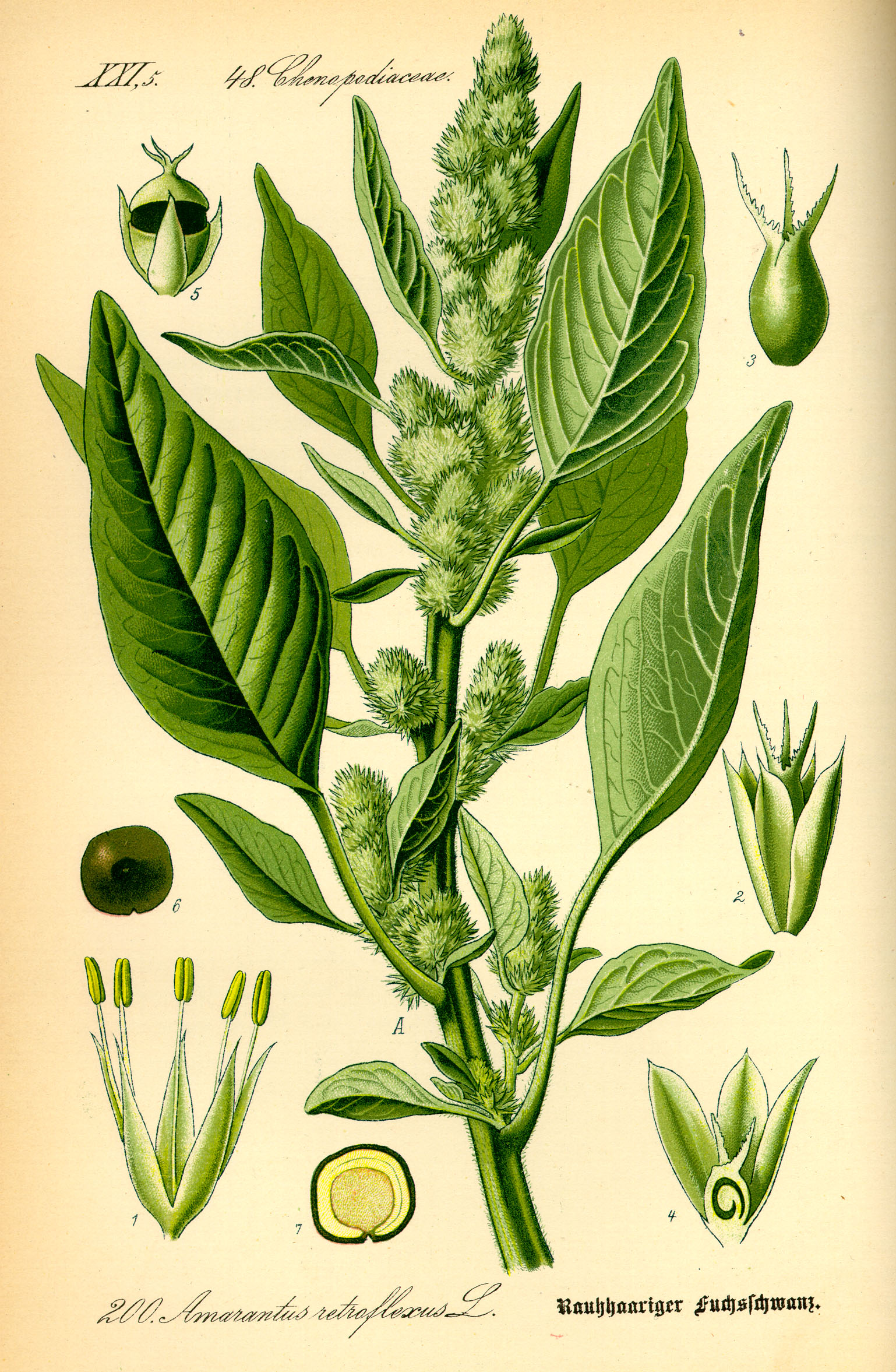
Red-root amaranth (A. retroflexus) by Otto Wilhelm Thomé (1885)

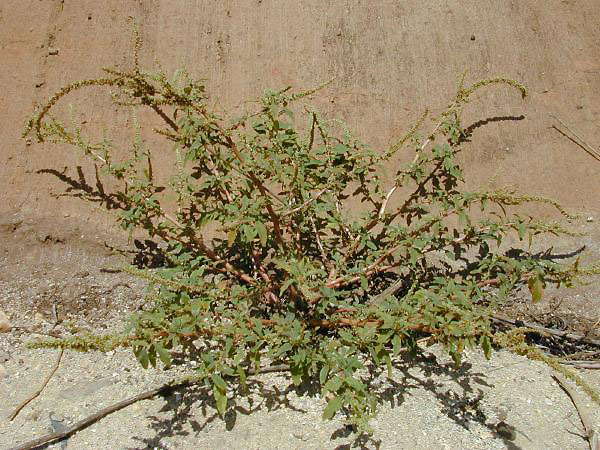
Spiny amaranth (A. spinosus)

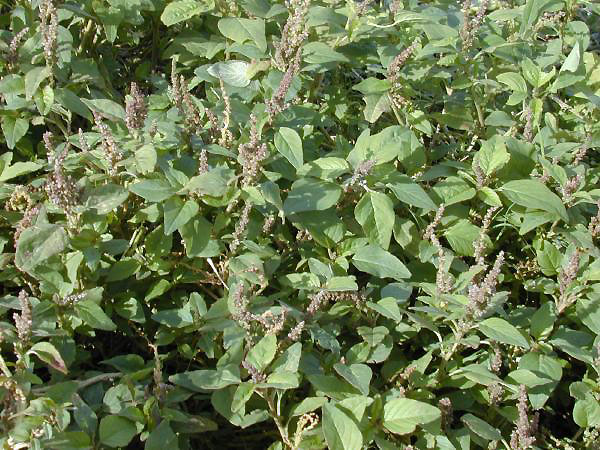
Green amaranth (A. viridis)

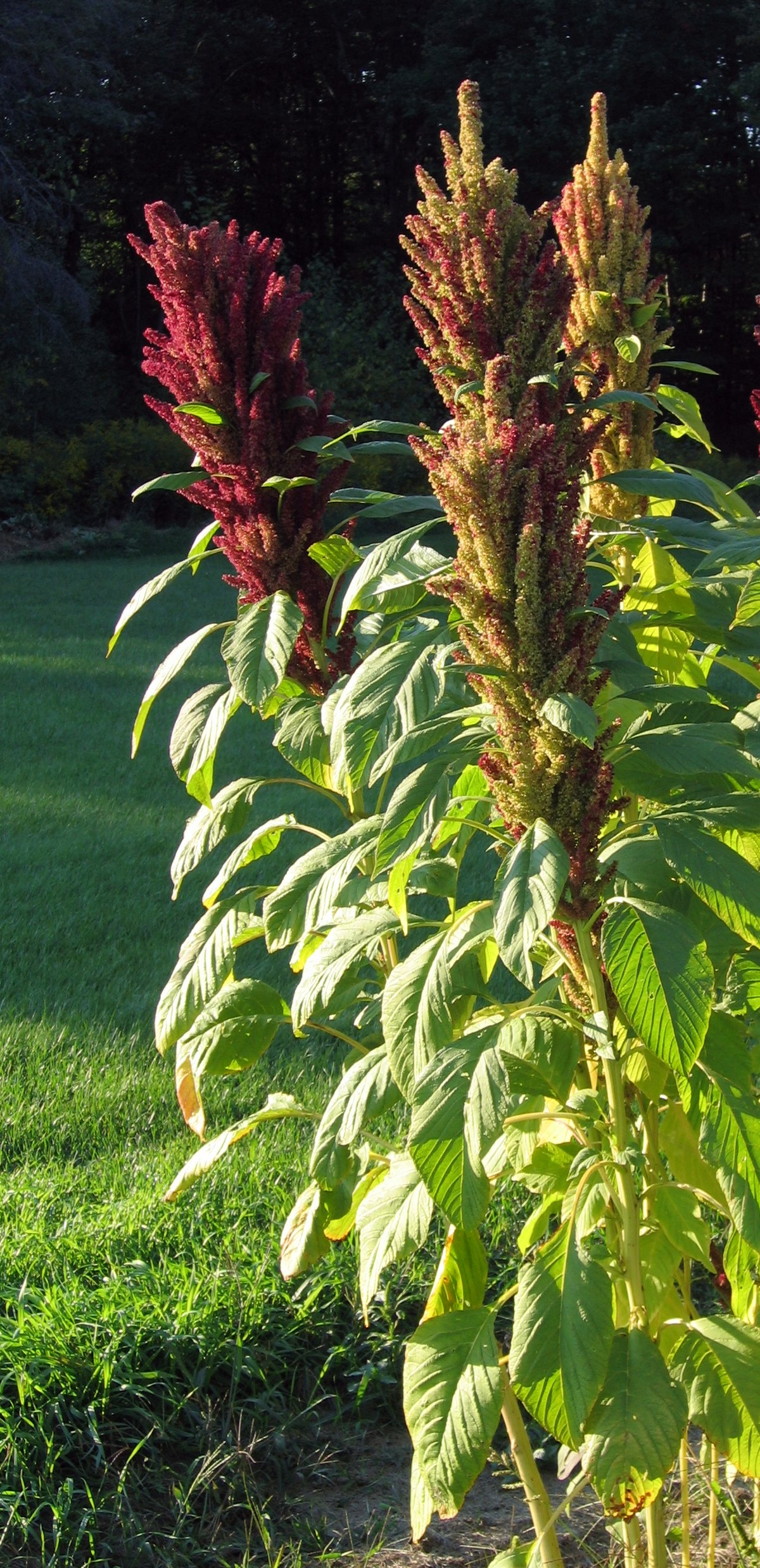
Popping amaranth (Amaranthus sp.)

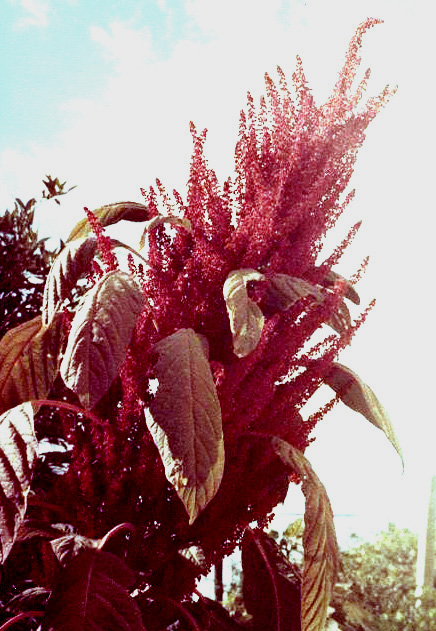
Amaranth from Chilpancingo

== See also ==
- Ancient grains
