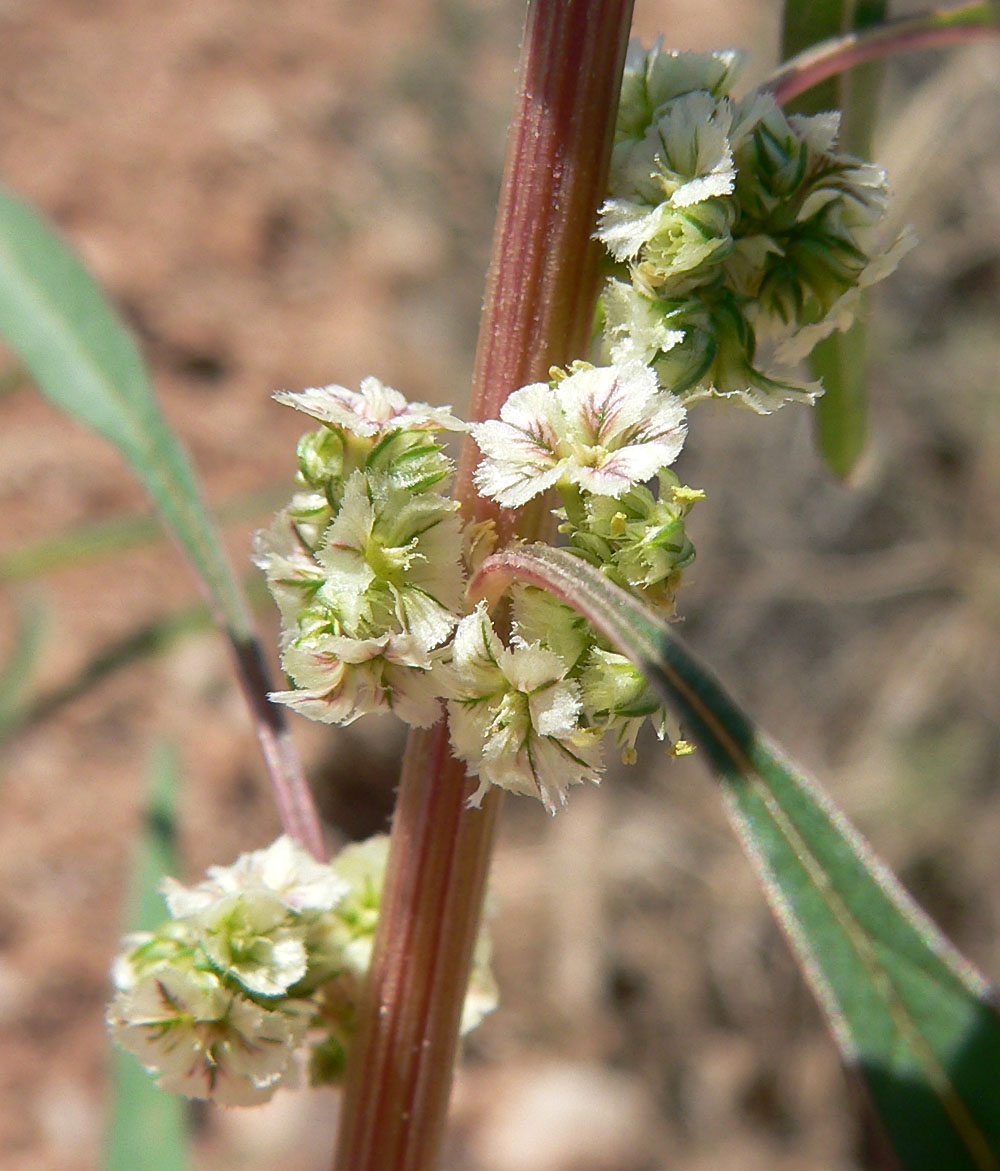
- In Red Rock Canyon, Nevada

Conservation status
- Secure (NatureServe)

Scientific classification
- Kingdom: Plantae
- Clade: Tracheophytes
- Clade: Angiosperms
- Clade: Eudicots
- Order: Caryophyllales
- Family: Amaranthaceae
- Genus: Amaranthus
- Species: A. fimbriatus

Binomial name
- Amaranthus fimbriatus (Torr.) Benth. ex S.Watson

= Amaranthus fimbriatus =

Species of flowering plant

Amaranthus fimbriatus is a species of glabrous flowering plant in the Amaranthaceae family. It is commonly known as fringed amaranth or fringed pigweed. The plant is an annual herb that can often grow up to 0.7 m (2 ft.) in height. The flower is greenish to maroon. It is found in North America and in Mexico. It often grows on sandy, gravelly slopes, semideserts or in disturbed habitats. It usually blooms after the summer rains in these arid regions. It is considered to be an invasive weed.

Two varieties of A. fimbriatus have been described: A. fimbriatus var. fimbriatus and A. fimbriatus var. denticulatus. The small variations are found in the tepals.
