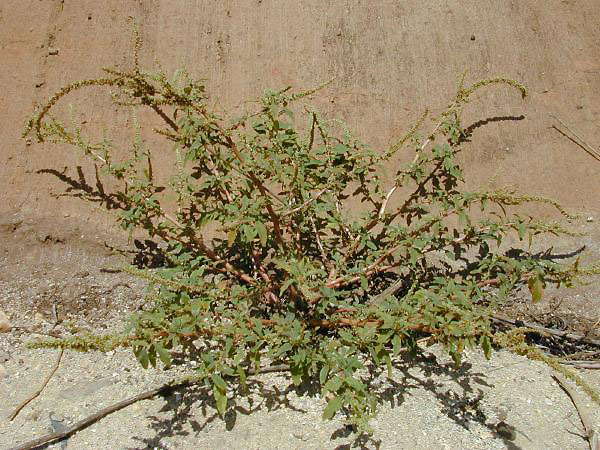

Conservation status
- Secure (NatureServe)

Scientific classification
- Kingdom: Plantae
- Clade: Tracheophytes
- Clade: Angiosperms
- Clade: Eudicots
- Order: Caryophyllales
- Family: Amaranthaceae
- Genus: Amaranthus
- Species: A. spinosus

Binomial name
- Amaranthus spinosus L.

= Amaranthus spinosus =

Species of flowering plant

Amaranthus spinosus, commonly known as the spiny amaranth, spiny pigweed, prickly amaranth or thorny amaranth, is a plant native to the tropical Americas. Spread worldwide as a weed, it is an aggressive invasive species toxic to livestock. It is a serious weed interfering with rice cultivation in Asia.

== Description ==
Amaranthus spinosus is a vascular flowering plant in the dicot family Amaranthaceae. As described in the species name, A. spinosus has spikes present on the flowers and spines present at nodes. The flowers are green, lack petals, and have terminal and axillary spikes. Male flowers are terminal while the female flowers are basal. The ovate or rhombic-ovate leaves are alternate with long petioles.

== Uses ==
=== Dye use ===
In Khmer language, it is called pti banlar and in Vietnamese dền and its ash was historically used as a grey cloth dye.

=== Food use ===
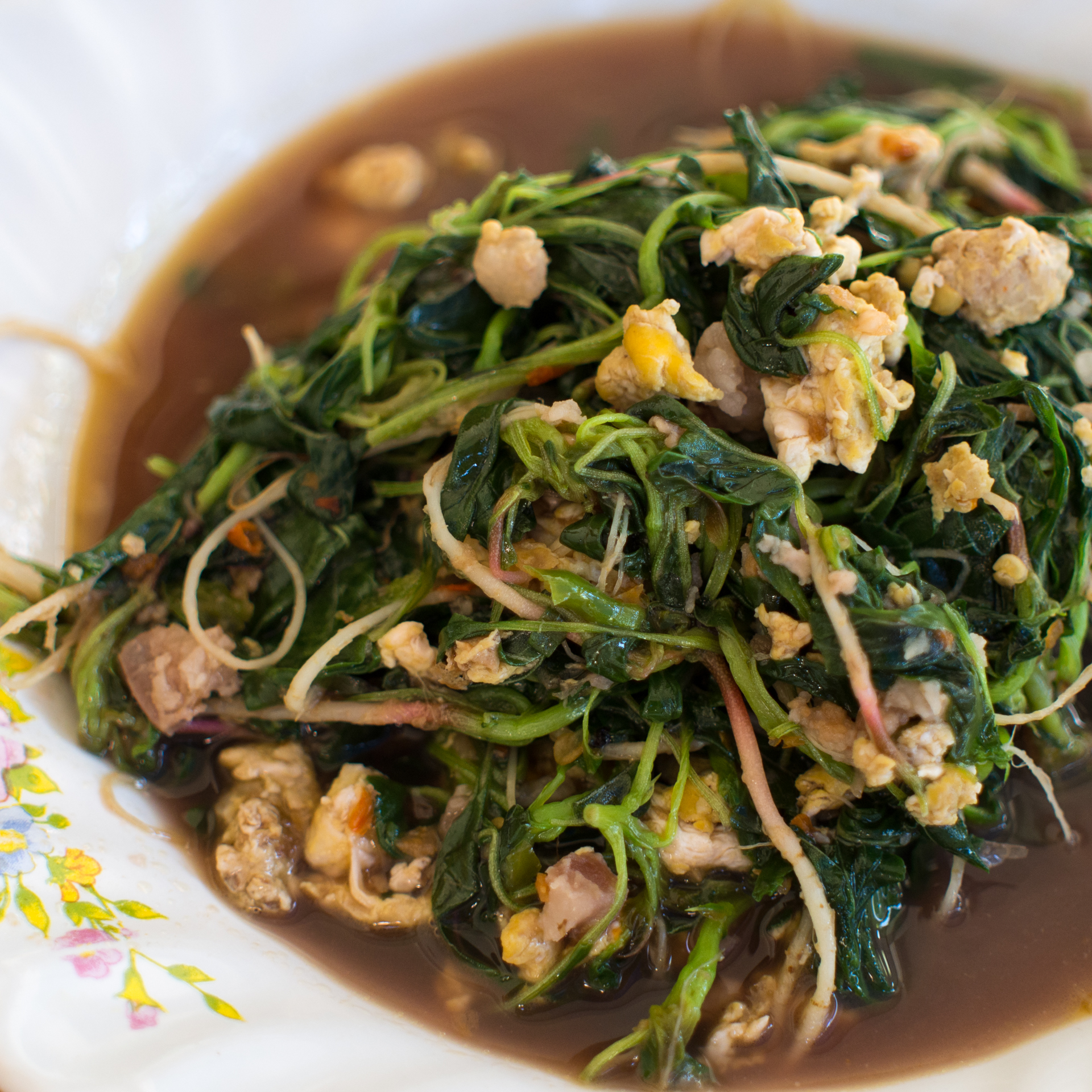
Phat phak khom is a Thai stir-fried dish of the young shoots of the Amaranthus spinosus. This version is stir-fried with egg and minced pork.

Like several related species, A. spinosus is a valued food plant in Africa. In southern Mozambique is called mboa and is food for both humans and some mammals In Brazil it is known as "caruru de porco", being used pure braised or added to salty porridge preparations, such as angu (pt) and is more common in the interior regions of the country. It is valued also in Thai cuisine, where it is called phak khom (Thai: ผักขม). In Tamil, it is called mullik keerai. It is possible identical to Sanskrit taṇḍulīyaka. It is used as food in the Philippines, where it is called kulitis. The leaves of this plant, known as massaagu in the Maldivian language, have been used in the diet of the Maldives. In Mexico, it is among the species labelled quelite quintonil in Mexican markets. In Bengali it is called katanote (কাটানটে). In Manipuri, it is called chengkrook and is used as food in stir-fry and in broths mixed with other vegetables. In Mauritius it is called brède malbar. The seeds are eaten by many songbirds.

=== Traditional medicine ===
In traditional medicine of Yucatan and Central America during the 20th century, A. spinosus was used as a decoction.
