= Amaranthus australis =

Conservation status
- Secure (NatureServe)

Scientific classification
- Kingdom: Plantae
- Clade: Tracheophytes
- Clade: Angiosperms
- Clade: Eudicots
- Order: Caryophyllales
- Family: Amaranthaceae
- Genus: Amaranthus
- Species: A. australis

Binomial name
- Amaranthus australis J.D. Sauer

Species of flowering plant

Amaranthus australis is also known as southern amaranth or southern water-hemp. The plant usually grows from 1 to 3 m (3.3 to 9.8 ft) in height, though some have been known to grow up to 9 m (30 ft) high. The stems can be up to 30 cm in diameter. It is a herbaceous annual. It is found in many southern states of the United States, Mexico, the West Indies, and South America. They are frequently found in wetland areas. It is herbaceous, short lived perennial. The largest is 4.6 m (15 ft) tall.
