= List of invasive species in Portugal =

This is a list of invasive species in Portugal. The species tagged with a cross (†) have the legal status of invasive species (Decreto-Lei n.º 565/99 de 21 de Dezembro). The remaining are considered invasive by investigators in Portugal. The species tagged with an "M" are classified as invasive only in Madeira.

== Invertebrates ==
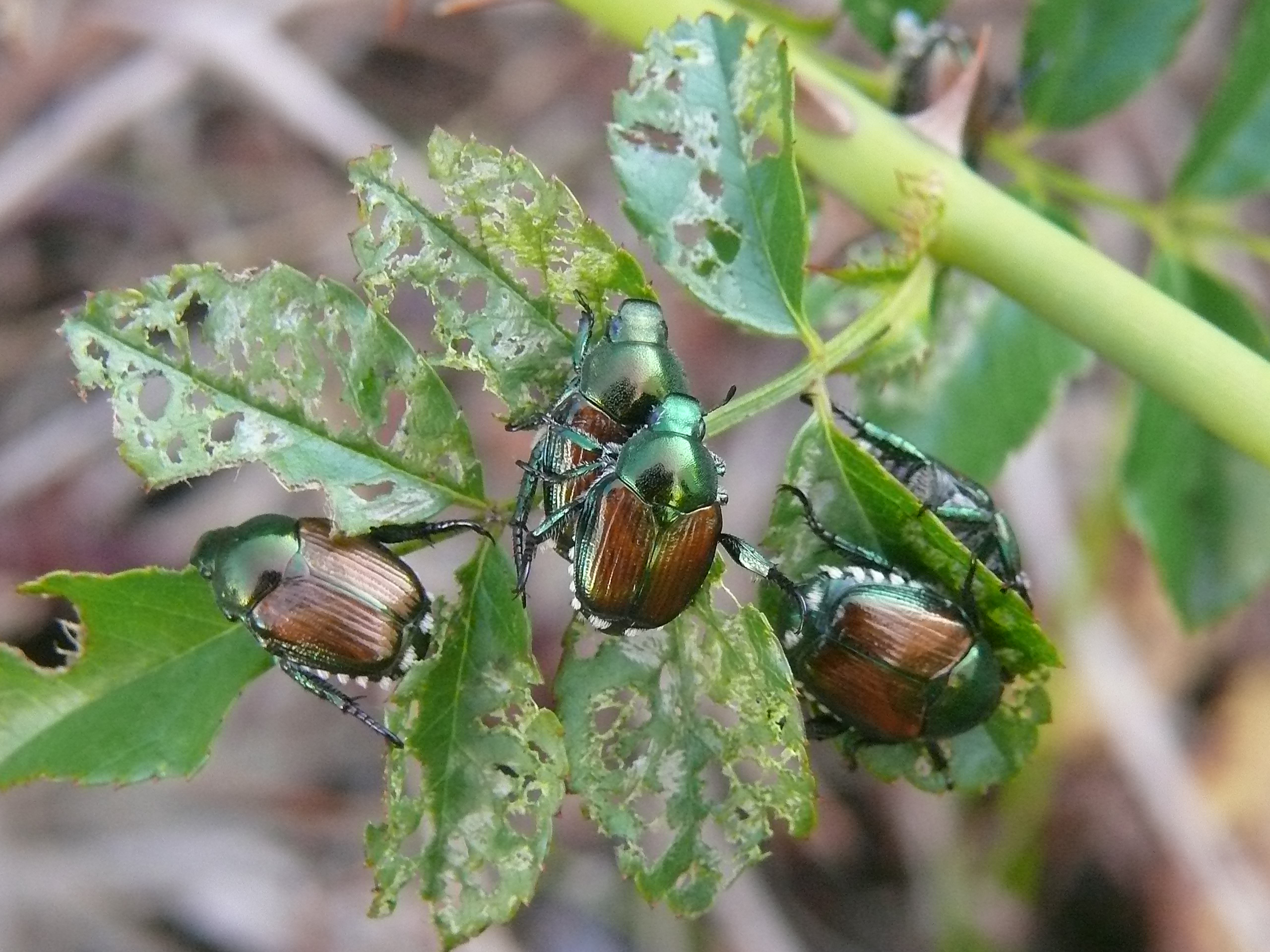
Popillia japonica on the Azores.

- Adelges piceae (balsam woolly adelgid)
- Aleurodicus dispersus (spiralling whitefly)
- Anguillicoloides crassus (swim bladder worm)
- Aphis spiraecola (Spirea aphid)
- Ceratitis capitata (Mediterranean fruit fly)
- Chilo suppressalis (striped rice stem borer)
- Cinara cupressi (Cypress aphid)
- Corbicula fluminea (Asian clam)(†)
- Cryptotermes brevis (powderpost termite)
- Ctenarytaina eucalypti (blue gum psyllid)
- Deroceras invadens (tramp slug)
- Elminius modestus (Australasian barnacle)
- Eriocheir sinensis (Chinese mitten crab)(†)
- Frankliniella occidentalis (western flower thrips)
- Globodera rostochiensis (yellow potato cyst nematode)
- Icerya purchasi (cottony cushion scale)
- Leptinotarsa decemlineata (Colorado potato beetle)(†)
- Linepithema humile (Argentine ant)(†)
- Lumbricus terrestris (common earthworm)
- Lysiphlebus testaceipes(†)
- Opogona sacchari (banana moth)
- Pacifastacus leniusculus (signal crayfish)(†)
- Paratrechina longicornis (longhorn crazy ant)
- Phoracantha semipunctata (Australian Eucalyptus longhorn)(†)
- Popillia japonica (Japanese beetle)
- Potamopyrgus antipodarum (New Zealand mud snail)(†)
- Procambarus clarkii (red swamp crawfish)(†)
- Styela clava (Asian tunicate)
- Thaumastocoris peregrinus (bronze bug)
- Tricellaria inopinata
- Vespa velutina nigrithorax (Yellow-legged Asian hornet)

== Amphibians ==
- Bufo marinus (†)
- Lithobates catesbeianus (†)
- Rana ridibunda (†)
- Xenopus laevis (†)

== Reptiles ==
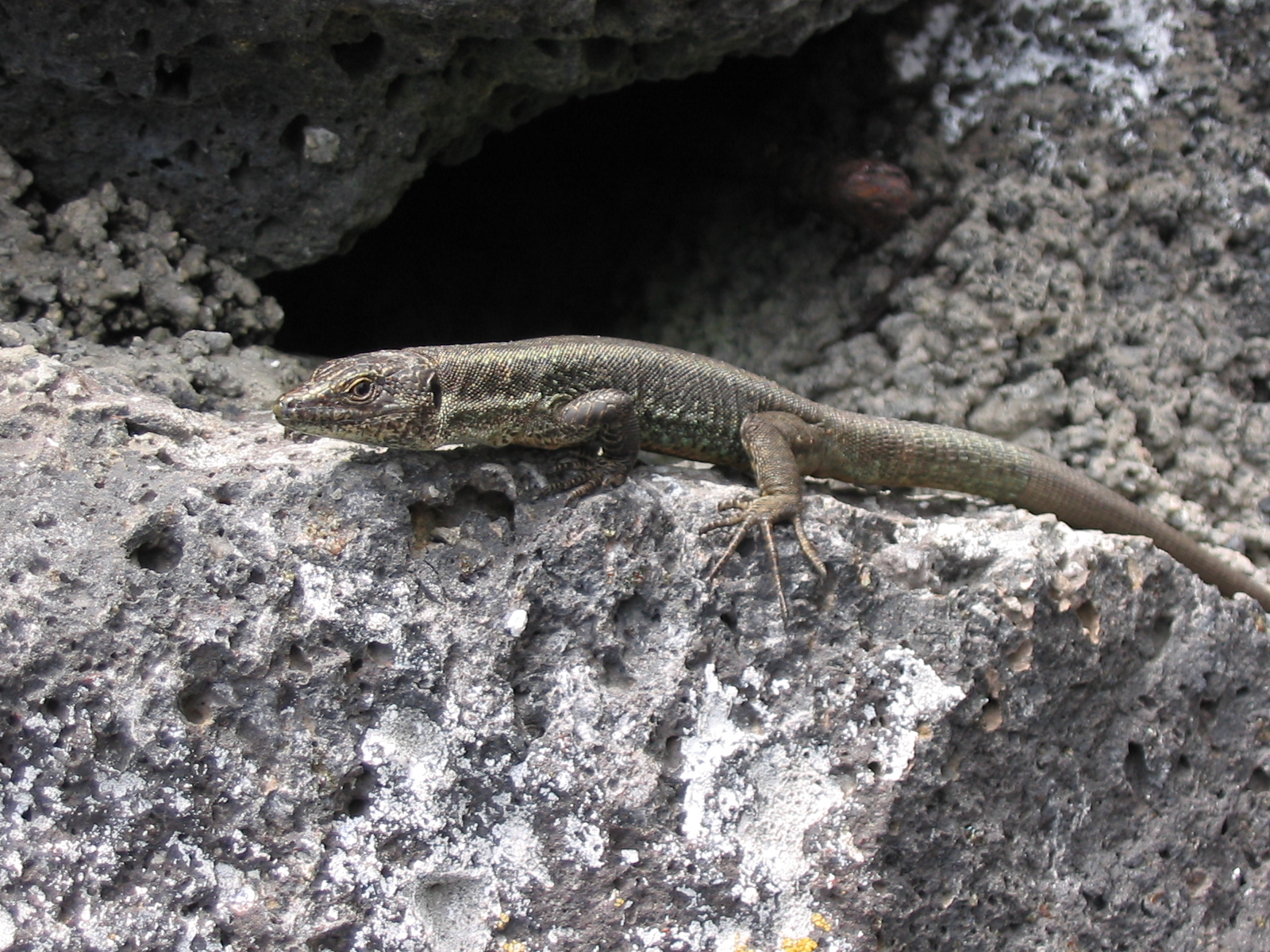
A Madeiran wall lizard on the Azores. Although native to Portugal (Madeira), the Madeiran wall lizard has also rapidly spread through the Azores due to the lack of other lizard species

- Chamaeleo chamaeleon (common chameleon) (†)
- Chelydra serpentina (†)
- Chrysemys picta (†)
- Graptemys spp. (†)
- Hemidactylus mabouia (†) (M)
- Macroclemys temminckii (†)
- Pseudemys spp. (†)
- Ramphotyphlops braminus (†) (M)
- Tarentola mauritanica (†) (M)
- Lacerta dugesii (Madeiran wall lizard)(†)
- Lampropeltis getula ssp. californiae (†) (M)
- Trachemys spp. (†)

== Fish ==
- Ameiurus melas (black bullhead)(†)
- Australoheros facetus (chameleon cichlid)(†)
- Carassius auratus (goldfish)(†)
- Cyprinus carpio (common carp)(†)
- Esox lucius (northern pike)(†)
- Fundulus heteroclitus (mummichog)(†)
- Gambusia holbrooki (eastern mosquitofish)(†)
- Gobio gobio (gudgeon)(†)
- Lepomis gibbosus (pumpkinseed)(†)
- Micropterus salmoides (largemouth bass)(†)
- Oncorhynchus mykiss (rainbow trout)(†)
- Sander lucioperca (Sander lucioperca)(†)

== Birds ==
Family Anatidae:

- Oxyura jamaicensis

Family Columbidae:

- Columbina passerina(†)

Family Estrildidae:

- Amadina fasciata(†)
- Amandava amandava(†)
- Amandava subflava(†)
- Estrilda astrild(†)
- Estrilda melpoda(†)
- Estrilda troglodytes(†)
- Lonchura cantans(†)
- Lonchura maja(†)
- Lonchura malacca(†)
- Taeniopygia castanotis(†)

Family Phasianidae:

- Francolinus francolinus(†)
- Phasianus colchicus(†)

Family Ploceidae:

- Euplectes afer(†)
- Euplectes franciscanus(†)
- Euplectes hordeaceus(†)
- Euplectes orix(†)
- Ploceus cucullatus(†)
- Ploceus melanocephalus(†)
- Quelea quelea(†)

Family Psittacidae:

- Myiopsitta monachus(†)
- Psittacula krameri(†)

== Mammals ==
- Ammotragus lervia (†)
- Callosciurus erythraeus (†)
- Capra hircus (†) (M)
- Castor canadensis (†)
- Erinaceus spp. (†) (M)
- Felis silvestris f. catus (†) *
- Herpestes javanicus (†)
- Hystrix cristata (†)
- Muntiacus reevesi (†)
- Mus musculus (†) (M)
- Mus domesticus (†) (M)
- Mustela spp. (†) (M)
  - Mustela furo (ferret)
- Myocastor coypus (†)
- Nasua nasua (†)
- Neogale vison (American mink) (†)
- Nyctereutes procyonoides (†)
- Ondatra zibethicus (†)
- Oryctolagus cuniculus (†) (M)
- Procyon spp. (†)
- Rattus spp. (†) (M)
  - Rattus norvegicus (brown rat)(†)
  - Rattus rattus (black rat)(†)
- Sciurus carolinensis (†)
- Sciurus niger (†)
- Tamias sibiricus (†)

== Plants ==
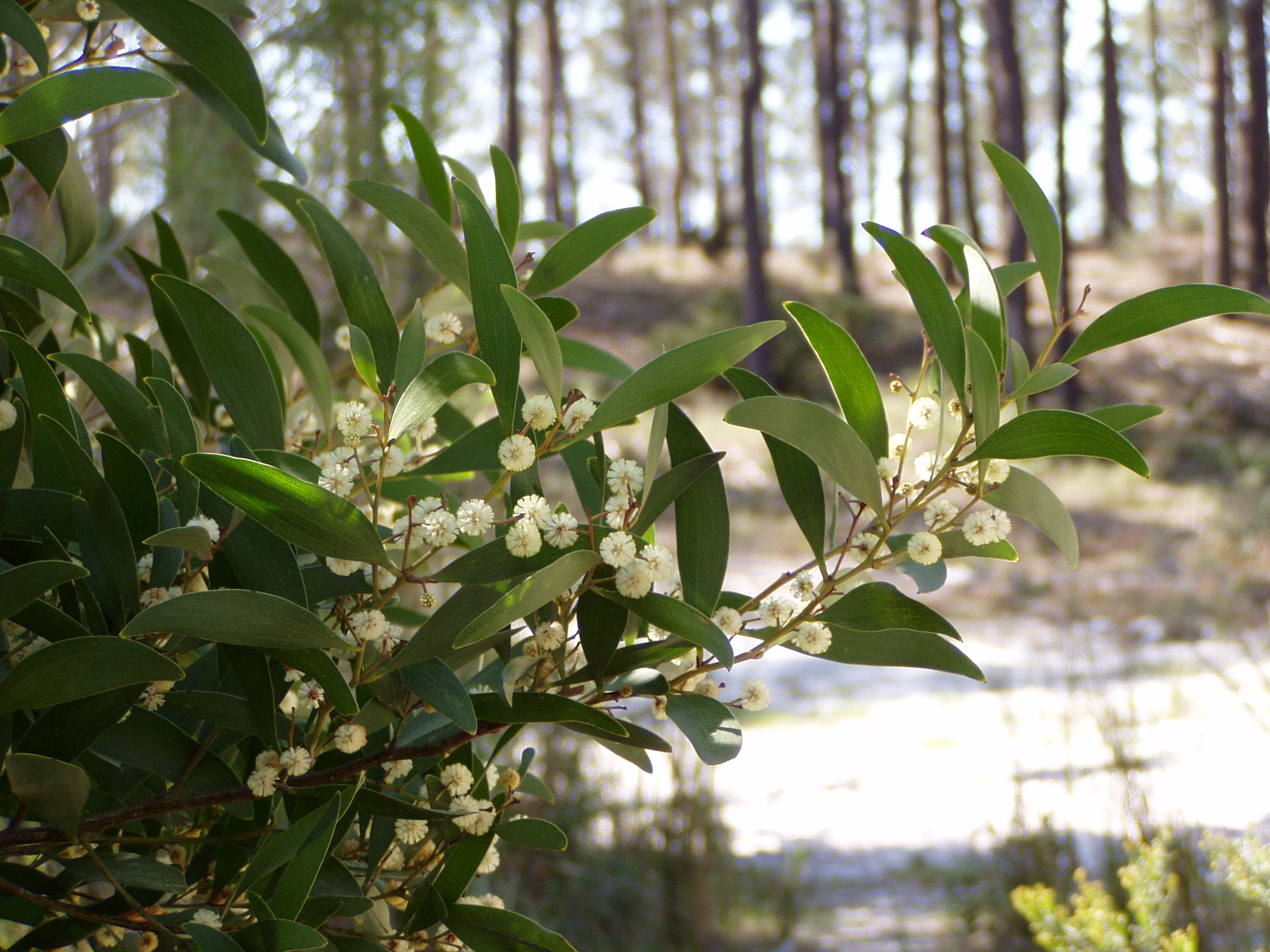
Acacia melanoxylon in Nazaré. Acacias are highly invasive in Portuguese sand dunes

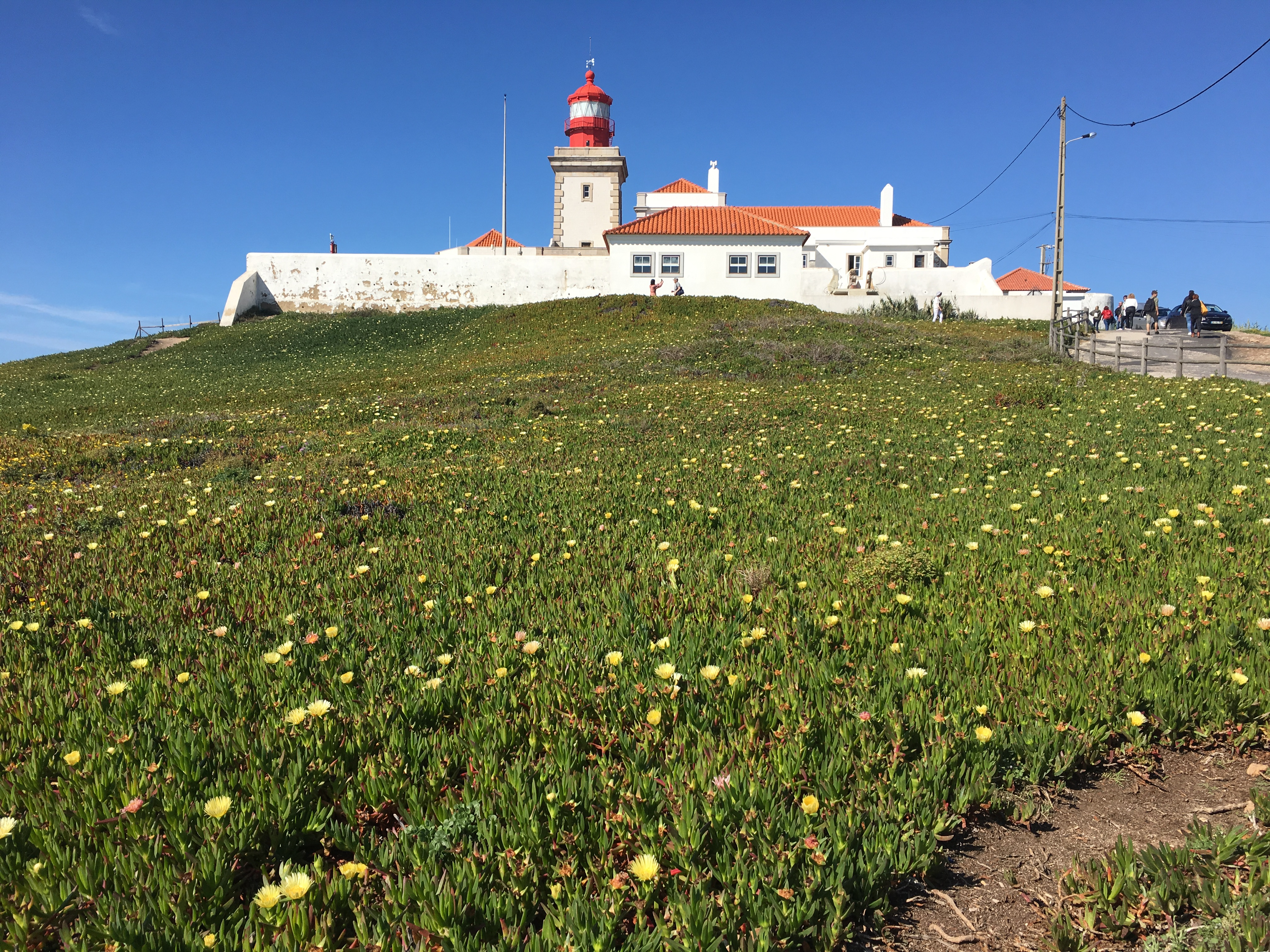
Carpobrotus edulis in Cabo da Roca

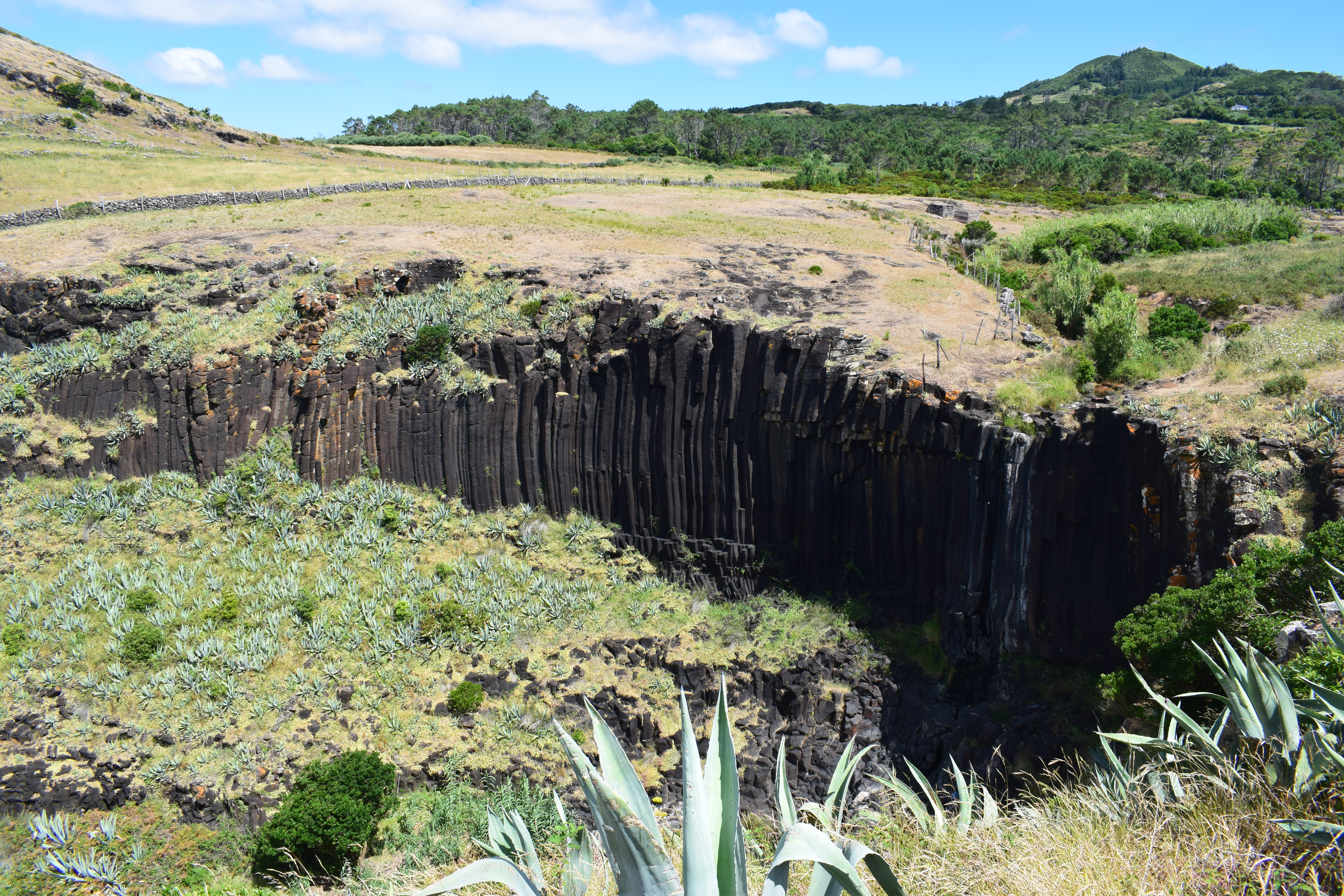
Agave americana on Santa Maria Island, Azores

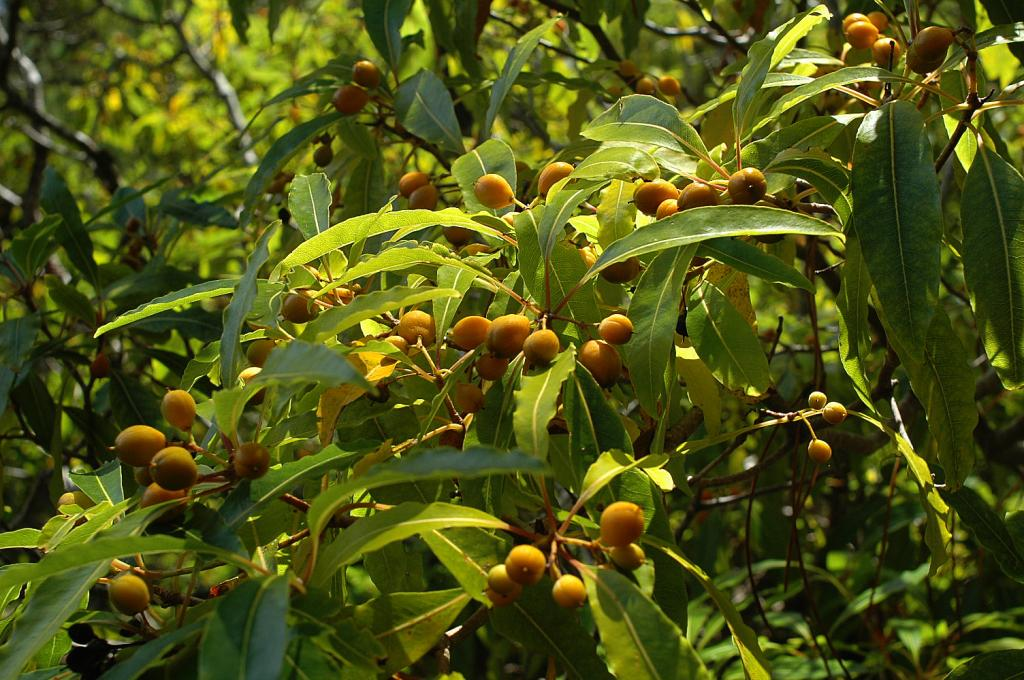
Pittosporum undulatum on Pico Island, a major threat to the endemic laurisilva of the Azores

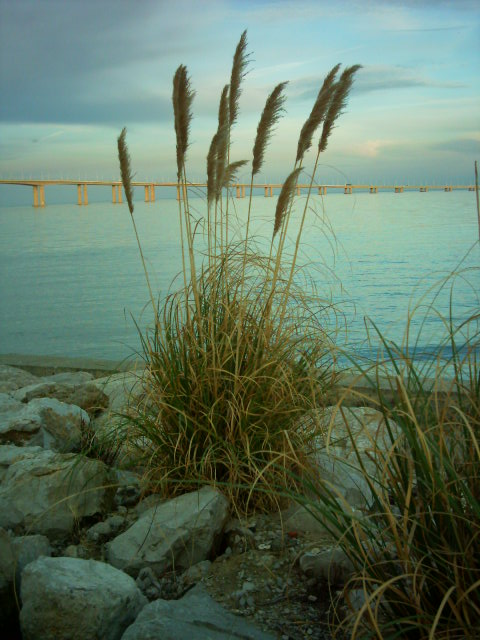
Cortaderia selloana growing spontaneously in Lisbon

- Abutilon sonneratianum (†) (M) (Cav.) Sweet
- Acacia spp. (†)
  - Acacia baileyana F.Muell
  - Acacia saligna (Labill.) H.L. Wendl.
  - Acacia cyclops A.Cunn. ex G.Don
  - Acacia dealbata Link.
  - Acacia decurrens (J.C.Wendl) Willd.
  - Acacia longifolia (Andrews) Willd.
  - Acacia mearnsii DeWild.
  - Acacia melanoxylon R.Br.
  - Acacia pycnantha
  - Acacia retinodes Schlecht
- Acanthus mollis (†) (M) L.
- Acer negundo (†) L.
- Acer pseudoplatanus (†) (M) L.
- Adiantum hispidulum (†) (M) Sw.
- Adiantum raddianum (†) (MadMeira) Sw.
- Agapanthus praecox ssp. orientalis (†) (M) F. M. Leight
- Adiantum hispidulum (†) (M) Sw.
- Agave americana (†) L.
- Ageratina adenophora (†) (Spreng.) R.M.King & H.Rob.
- Ageratina riparia (†) (M) (Regel) R. M. King & H. Rob.
- Ailanthus altissima (Miller) Swingle
- Albizia julibrissin (†) Durazz.
- Aloe arborescens (†) (M) Mill.
- Alternanthera philoxeroides (†) (Mart.) Griseb.
- Alternanthera caracasana (†) Kunth
- Alternanthera nodiflora (†) R. Br.
- Alternanthera pungens (†) Kunth
- Amaranthus albus (†) L.
- Amaranthus blitoides (†) S. Watson
- Amaranthus blitum ssp. emarginatus (†) (Moq. ex Uline & Bray) Carretero, Muñoz Garmendia & Pedrol
- Amaranthus caudatus (†) L.
- Amaranthus cruentus (†) L.
- Amaranthus deflexus (†) L.
- Amaranthus hybridus (†) L.
- Amaranthus hypochondriacus (†) L.
- Amaranthus muricatus (†) (Gillies ex Moq.) Hieron.
- Amaranthus paniculatus (†) L.
- Amaranthus powellii (†) S. Watson
- Amaranthus retroflexus (†) L.
- Amaranthus viridis (†) L.
- Amaranthus x ozanonii (†) Thell. ex Priszter
- Amaryllis belladonna (†) (M) Kunth
- Aptenia cordifolia (†) (M) (L. f.) Schwantes
- Araujia sericifera (†) Brot.
- Arctotheca calendula (†) (L.) Levyns
- Arctotheca calendula (L.) Levins
- Arundo donax (†) L.
- Asclepias curassavica (†) L.
- Asclepias syriaca (†) L.
- Asparagus asparagoides (†) (M) (L.) Druce
- Aster squamatus (†) (Spreng.) Hieron.
- Atriplex rosea (†) (M) L.
- Atriplex semibaccata (†) (M) R. Br.
- Azolla caroliniana Willd.
- Azolla filiculoides (†) Lam.
- Baccharis halimifolia (†) L.
- Baccharis spicata (†) (Lam.) Baill.
- Bidens aurea (†) (Aiton) Sherff
- Bidens frondosa (†) L.
- Bidens pilosa (†) L.
- Brachiaria mutica (†) (M) (Forssk.) Stapf
- Cabomba caroliniana (†) Gray
- Cardiospermum grandiflorum (†) (M) Sw.
- Carpobrotus acinaciformis (†) (L.) L. Bolus
- Carpobrotus edulis (L.)N.E.Br.
- Cenchrus ciliaris (†) (M) L.
- Centranthus ruber (†) (M) (L.) DC.
- Chasmanthe aethiopica (†) (M) (L.) N.E. Br.
- Chrysanthemum coronarium (†) (M) L.
- Cirsium vulgare (†) (M) (Savi) Ten.
- Colocasia esculenta (†) (M) (L.) Schott
- Commelina diffusa (†) (M) Burm. F.
- Conyza bonariensis (†) (L.) Cronq.
- Conyza canadensis (†) L.
- Conyza sumatrensis (†) (Retz.) E. Walker
- Coronopus didymus (†) (L.) J.E. Sm.
- Cortaderia selloana (†) (J.A. & J.H. Schultes) Aschers & Graebner
- Cotula australis (†) (M) (Sieber ex Spreng.) Hook. fil.
- Cotula coronopifolia (†) L.
- Crassula ovata (†) (M) (Mill.) Druce
- Crassula multicava (†) (M) Lem.
- Crinum bulbispermum (†) (M) (Burm.) Milne-Redh. & Schweick.
- Crocosmia x crocosmiiflora (†) (M) (Lemoine) N.E. Br.
- Cyperus rotundus (†) L.
- Cyrtomium falcatum (†) (M) (L. fil.) C. Presl
- Cytisus scoparius (†) (M) (L.) Link
- Cytisus striatus (†) (M) (Hill) Rothm
- Datura innoxia (†) (M) Mill.
- Datura stramonium L.
- Delairea odorata (†) (M) Lem. (= Senecio mikanoides Otto ex Walp.)
- Doodia caudata (†) (M) (Cav.) R. Br.
- Duchesnea indica (†) (M) (Andr.) Focke
- Egeria densa (†) Planch.
- Eichhornia crassipes (†) (C.R.P..Mart.) Solms. Laub.
- Elodea canadensis (†) Mich.
- Elodea nuttallii (†) (Planch.) St. John
- Erigeron karvinskianus DC.
- Eryngium pandanifolium Cham. & Schlecht
- Eschscholzia californica (†) Champ. (M)
- Eucalyptus globulus Labill
- Fallopia baldschuanica (†) (Regel) J. Holub
- Fallopia japonica (†) (Houtt.) Ronse Decr. (= Reynoutria japonica Houtt.)
- Fallopia sachalinensis (†) (Schmidt) Ronse Decr.
- Fallopia × bohemica (†) (J. Chrtek & A. Chrtková) J. P. Bailey
- Fuchsia arborescens (†) Sims (M)
- Fuchsia magellanica (†) Lam. (M)
- Galinsoga parviflora Cav.
- Galinsoga quadriradiata (†) Ruiz et Pav. (M)
- Gleditsia triacanthos (†) L.
- Gomphocarpus fruticosus (†) (L.) Aiton fil.
- Gunnera tinctoria (†) (Molina) Mirbel
- Hakea salicifolia (†) (Vent.) B.L.Burtt
- Hakea sericea (†) Schrader - Háquia-picante
- Hedychium gardnerianum (†) Sheppard ex Ker Grwal
- Helichrysum foetidum (†) (M) (L.) Cass.
- Heracleum mantegazzianum (†) Sommier & Levier
- Heracleum persicum (†) Fischer
- Heracleum sosnowskyi (†) Mandenova
- Holcus lanatus (†) (M) L.
- Hydrangea macrophylla (†) (M) (Thunb.) Ser.
- Hydrilla verticillata (†) (L. f.) Royle
- Hydrocotyle ranunculoides (†) L. f.
- Impatiens glandulifera (†) Royle
- Ipomoea acuminata (†) (Vahl.) Roemer & Schultes
- Ipomoea indica (†) (Burm.) Merr.
- Ipomea purpurea (†) (M) (L.) Roth
- Isatis tinctoria (†) (M) L.
- Kalanchoe daigremontiana (†) (M) Raym.-Hamet & H. Perrier
- Kalanchoe delagoensis (†) (M) Eckl. et Zeyh.
- Kalanchoe fedtschenkoi (†) (M) Raym.-Hamet et Perrier
- Kalanchoe pinnata (†) (M) (Lam.) Pers. N
- Lagarosiphon major (†) (Ridley) Moss
- Lantana camara (†) L.
- Lepidium didymum (†) (M) L.
- Leptospermum scoparium (†) (M) J. R. Forst. & G. Forst.
- Leucaena leucocephala (†) (M) (Lam.) De Wit
- Leycesteria formosa (†) (M) Wall.
- Lonicera japonica (†) Thunb.
- Ludwigia grandiflora (†) (Michx.) Greuter & Burdet
- Ludwigia peploides (†) (Kunth) Raven
- Ludwigia uruguayensis (†) (Cambess.) H.Hara
- Lycopersicon esculentum (†) (M) Mill. var. esculentum
- Lysichiton americanus (†) Hultén & St. John
- Malephora crocea (†) (M) (Jacq.) Schwantes
- Melinis repens (†) (M) (Willd.) Zizka
- Malvastrum coromandelianum (†) (M) (L.) Garcke
- Microstegium vimineum (†) (Trin.) A. Camus
- Myoporum tenuifolium G.Forster
- Myriophyllum aquaticum (†) (Velloso) Verdc.
- Myriophyllum brasiliensis (†) Camb.
- Myriophyllum heterophyllum (†) Michaux
- Nicotiana glauca (†) R.C. Graham
- Nymphaea mexicana (†) Zucc.
- Opuntia elata (†) Salm-Dyck
- Opuntia ficus-indica (L.) Miller
- Opuntia maxima (†) Miller
- Opuntia subulata (†) (Muehlenpf.) Engelm (= Austrocylindropuntia subulata)
- Opuntia tuna (†) (M) (L.) Mill.
- Oxalis corniculata (†) (M) L.
- Oxalis pes-caprae (†) L.
- Oxalis purpurea (†) L.
- Paraserianthes lophantha (†) (M) (Willd.) I.C. Nielsen [=Albizia lophantha (Vent) J.F. Macbr.]
- Parthenium hysterophorus (†) L.
- Paspalum paspalodes (†) (Michx) Scribner
- Paspalum vaginatum (†) Swartz
- Passiflora tripartita (†) (M) (Juss.) Poir. var. mollissima (Kunth) Holm-Niels. & P. Jørg.
- Paulownia tomentosa (†) (Thunberg) Steudel
- Pelargonium inquinans (†) (M) (L.) L'Hér. ex Ait.
- Pennisetum purpureum (†) (M) Schum.
- Pennisetum setaceum (†) (Forssk.) Chiov.
- Pennisetum villosum (†) R. Br. ex Fresen
- Persicaria perfoliata (†) (L.) H. Gross (= Polygonum perfoliatum L.)
- Petroselinum crispum (†) (M) (Mill.) A.W. Hill
- Physalis peruviana (†) (M) L.
- Phytolacca americana (†) L.
- Pistia stratiotes (†) L.
- Pittosporum undulatum (†) Vent.
- Podranea ricasoliana (†) (Tanfani) Sprague
- Polygonum capitatum (†) Buch.-Ham.ex D.Don
- Pueraria lobata (†) (Willdenow) Ohwi (= P. montana var lobata)
- Psidium cattleyanum (†) Sabine
- Reynoutria japonica Houtt.
- Rhus coriaria (†) (M) L.
- Ricinus communis (†) L.
- Robinia pseudoacacia (†) L.
- Sagittaria latifolia (†) Willd.
- Salpichroa origanifolia (†) (M) (Lam.) Thell.
- Salvinia molesta (†) D.S. Mitchell
- Senecio bicolor (†) (Willd.) Tod. ssp. cinerea (DC.) Chater
- Senecio inaequidens (†) DC.
- Senecio mikanioides (†) (M) Otto ex Walp.
- Senecio petasitis (†) (M) (Sims) DC.
- Sesbania punicea (Cav.) Benth.
- Setaria verticillata (†) (M) (L.) P. Beauv.
- Solanum lycopersicum (†) (M) L. var. lycopersicum
- Solanum mauritianum (†) Scop.
- Soleirolia soleirolii (†) (M) (Req.) Dandy
- Sorghum halepense (†) (L.) Pers.
- Spartina densiflora (†) Brongn.
- Symphyotrichum subulatum (†) (M) (Michx.) G. L. Nesom var. squamatum (Spreng.) S. D. Sundb.
- Tamarix gallica (†) (M) L.
- Tetragonia tetragonioides (†) (M) (Pall.) Kuntze
- Tradescantia fluminensis (†) Velloso
- Tradescantia zebrina (†) (M) Hort. ex Bosse Vollst.
- Tropaeolum majus (†) L.
- Ulex europaeus (†) (M) L.
- Ulex minor (†) (M) Roth
- Vachellia karroo (Hayne) Banfi & Galasso
- Verbena bonariensis (†) (M) L.
- Verbena rigida (†) (M) Spreng.
- Vinca major (†) (M) L.
- Zantedeschia aethiopica (†) (M) (L.) Spreng.
