= List of adventive wild plants in Israel =

List of adventive wild plants in Israel refers to species of vascular plants in Israel that were either introduced there by human activity or are of a cultivated origin, and meet at least one of the following criteria:

- species which have reached a self-propagating (naturalized) status in Israel, reproducing without further human intervention
- species that appear in natural habitats
- cultivated species that escape from cultivation or persist long after being abandoned

The first table lists species which are unquestionably non-indigenous to Israel; a second table lists species whose native distribution in Israel is questionable.

== Adventive species ==
	Binomial name	Family	Hebrew name	Native distribution	Type of introduction	First record in Israel	Propagation strategies in Israel	Notes
1	Abutilon theophrasti	Malvaceae	אבוטילון תיאופרסטוס	Eurasia		1942		invasive in cotton fields
2	Acacia cyclops	Fabaceae	שיטה עגולת-זרעים	Australia	intentional (forestation)	introd. 1920-30		invasive
3	Acacia farnesiana	Fabaceae	שיטת המשוכות	Australia				
4	Acacia paradoxa	Fabaceae	שיטה דוקרנית	Australia	intentional	introd. 1920-30		
5	Acacia salicina	Fabaceae	שיטת עלי-הערבה	Australia	intentional			planted by the JNF, invasive
6	Acacia saligna	Fabaceae	שיטה כחלחלה	Australia	intentional (forestation, dune stabilization)	introd. 1920-30	seed + vegetative	invasive
7	Acacia victoriae	Fabaceae	שיטת ויקטוריה	Australia	intentional			planted by the JNF, invasive
8	Achyranthes aspera	Amaranthaceae	רב-מוץ מחוספס	Pantropical		1900		
9	Aegilops cylindrica	Poaceae	בן-חיטה גלילני	Eurasia		1990-95		
10	Agave americana	Agavaceae	אגבה אמריקנית	America	intentional (ornamental)			
11	Ailanthus altissima	Simarubaceae	אילנתה בלוטית	Asia	intentional (ornamental)	introd. 1920-30?	seed + vegetative, anemochory	invasive
12	Alternanthera pungens	Amaranthaceae	ביצן דוקרני	S. America		1949		
13	Amaranthus albus	Amaranthaceae	ירבוז לבן	America		1879		
14	Amaranthus blitoides	Amaranthaceae	ירבוז שרוע	N. America		1948-9		
15	Amaranthus blitum	Amaranthaceae	ירבוז מבריק	America		1926		
16	Amaranthus cruentus	Amaranthaceae	ירבוז ירוק-שיבולת	N. America		1906		
17	Amaranthus deflexus	Amaranthaceae	ירבוז נטוי	America		1907		
18	Amaranthus graecizans	Amaranthaceae	ירבוז יווני	N. America		1906		
19	Amaranthus muricatus	Amaranthaceae	ירבוז מוריגי	S. America		1964		
20	Amaranthus palmeri	Amaranthaceae	ירבוז פלמר	N. America		1957		
21	Amaranthus retroflexus	Amaranthaceae	ירבוז מופשל	N. America		1906		
22	Amaranthus rudis	Amaranthaceae	ירבוז הגדות	N. America		1970		
23	Amaranthus spinosus	Amaranthaceae	ירבוז קוצני	America		1936–1960		
24	Amaranthus viridis	Amaranthaceae	ירבוז עדין	America		1906		
25	Ambrosia confertiflora	Asteraceae	אמברוסיה מכונסת	America				
26	Ambrosia grayi	Asteraceae	אמברוסיה גריי	N. America				
27	Ambrosia tenuifolia	Asteraceae	אמברוסיה צרת-עלים	America		1991		
28	Ambrosia trifida	Asteraceae	אמברוסיה שסועה	America		1987		
29	Anacyclus radiatus	Asteraceae	קחווינה מקרינה	Mediterranean		1965		
30	Anethum graveolens	Apiaceae	שבת ריחני	Mediterranean	intentional (spice)			
31	Anoda cristata	Malvaceae	אנודה מצויצת	N. America		1981		invasive in cotton fields
32	Antirrhinum siculum	Plantaginaceae	לוע-ארי סיצילי	Mediterranean		1889		
33	Araujia sericifera	Asclepiadaceae	ארויה משיינית	S. America	intentional	1976		invasive in orchards
34	Arctotheca calendula	Asteraceae	ארקטותקה משוננת	S. Africa	intentional (soil stabilization)	2004		invasive
35	Argemone mexicana	Papaveraceae	ארגמון מכסיקאי	America		1953		
36	Artemisia arborescens	Asteraceae	לענה שיחנית	Mediterranean		1875?		possibly introduced by the crusaders
37	Artemisia scoparia	Asteraceae	לענת המכבד	Eurasia		1936		
38	Asparagus setaceus	Papaveraceae	אספרג מנוצה	S. Africa			ornithochory	
39	Aster subulatus	Asteraceae	אסתר מרצעני	N. America		1960		invasive in wet habitats
40	Atriplex canescens	Amaranthaceae		N. America		1974?		
41	Atriplex holocarpa	Amaranthaceae	מלוח ספוגי	Australia	intentional	1972		invasive in deserts
42	Atriplex muelleri	Amaranthaceae	מלוח מילר	Australia	intentional (ornamental and forage)			
43	Atriplex nummularia	Amaranthaceae	מלוח המטבעות	Australia	intentional (forage crop)	1975		
44	Atriplex semibaccata	Amaranthaceae	מלוח הענבות	Australia	intentional (ornamental)	1933		
45	Atriplex suberecta	Amaranthaceae	מלוח קטן-פרי	Australia		1982~		
46	Avena sativa	Poaceae	שיבולת-שועל תרבותית	cultivated	intentional (agriculture)			
47	Azolla filiculoides	Azollaceae	אזולה שרכית	America				
48	Bassia indica	Amaranthaceae	בסיה הודית	Asia		1917		invasive in the Northern Negev and coastline
49	Bassia scoparia	Amaranthaceae	בסיית המכבד	Australia		1933		
50	Bidens pilosa	Asteraceae	דו-שן שעיר	America		1954		invasive
51	Borago officinalis	Boraginaceae	זיפן רפואי	Mediterranean		1987		
52	Borrichia frutescens	Asteraceae	בוריכיה שיחנית	N. America		2000		
53	Bothriochloa saccharoides	Poaceae	משבל מלבין	America				
54	Brassica napus	Brassicaceae	כרוב הנפוס	cultivated	intentional (agriculture)			
55	Bromus catharticus	Poaceae	ברומית גדולה	S. America	intentional (forage crop)	1939		
56	Bromus commutatus	Poaceae	ברומית השיפון	Eurasia				
57	Callistemon viminalis	Myrtaceae	קליסטמון אדום	Australia	intentional (ornamental)			
58	Cardiospermum halicacabum	Sapindaceae	לבן משולש	Pantropical				
59	Carpobrotus edulis	Aizoaceae		S. Africa				
60	Cenchrus echinatus	Poaceae	פוקה קוצנית	N. America		1970		invasive mainly in citrus groves
61	Cenchrus incertus	Poaceae	פוקה דלילה	America		1953		
62	Centaurea eriophora	Asteraceae	דרדר לביד	Mediterranean		1988		
63	Chasmanthe aethiopica	Iridaceae	קסמנתה אתיופית	S. Africa	intentional (ornamental)			
64	Chenopodium ambrosioides	Amaranthaceae	כף-אווז ריחנית	America		1906		
65	Chenopodium ficifolium	Amaranthaceae		Europe		1988		
66	Chenopodium missouriense	Amaranthaceae	כף-אווז מיזורי	N. America				
67	Chenopodium urbicum	Amaranthaceae		Eurasia		1967		
68	Chloris gayana	Poaceae	עשבת המרעה	Africa	intentional	1933		
69	Chloris pycnothrix	Poaceae	עשבה קהה	Africa		1989		
70	Chloris virgata	Poaceae	עשבה רותמית	America?		1959		
71	Ciclospermum leptophyllum	Apiaceae	כרפסית עדינה	America		1990		
72	Cirsium arvense	Asteraceae	קוצן השדה	Eurasia		2006		
73	Cirsium vulgare	Asteraceae	קוצן החולה	Eurasia				
74	Commelina erecta	Commelinaceae	קומלינה זקופה	America				common garden weed
75	Conyza albida	Asteraceae	קייצת מלבינה	S. America		1957	anemochory	
76	Conyza bonariensis	Asteraceae	קייצת מסולסלת	S. America		1896	anemochory	invasive in natural habitats
77	Conyza canadensis	Asteraceae	קייצת קנדית	N. America		1939	anemochory	
78	Coronopus didymus	Brassicaceae	שחליל מכופל	America		1984		
79	Cotula anthemoides	Asteraceae	קוטולה קחוונית	Paleotropical		1960		
80	Cupressus sempervirens var. sempervirens	Cupressaceae	ברוש מצוי, זן צריפי	cultivated	intentional (ornamental)			
81	Cuscuta campestris	Euphorbiaceae	כשות השדות	N. America		1951		
82	Cymbalaria muralis	Plantaginaceae	צלצל החומות	Mediterranean				
83	Cyperus alternifolius	Cyperaceae	גומא תרבותי	Africa				
84	Cyperus esculentus	Cyperaceae	גומא נאכל	Holoarctic				
85	Cyperus odoratus	Cyperaceae	גומא ריחני	Pantropical		1980-90		
86	Datisca cannabina	Datiscaceae	דטיסקה קנבית	Eurasia				single record
87	Datura ferox	Solanaceae	דטורה אכזרית	Asia		1952		invasive in cotton fields
88	Datura innoxia	Solanaceae	דטורה נטוית-פרי	America		1896		invasive in cotton fields
89	Datura stramonium	Solanaceae	דטורה זקופת-פרי	N. America		1912		
90	Senecio angulatus	Asteraceae	סביון מטפס	S. Africa	intentional (ornamental)			
91	Dinebra retroflexa	Poaceae	זנבה נטויה	Paleotropical		1922		invasive in cotton fields
92	Diplotaxis tenuifolia	Brassicaceae	טוריים צרי-עלים	Mediterranean		1941		
93	Dodonaea viscosa	Sapindaceae	דודוניאה דביקה	Pantropical	intentional (ornamental)	1938	anemochory	invasive
94	Dyssodia tenuiloba	Asteraceae	דיסודיה צרת-עלים	C. America				
95	Eclipta prostrata	Asteraceae	אל-ציצית לבנה	N. America		1917		
96	Ehrharta erecta	Poaceae	אורזית זקופה	Africa		1999		
97	Eichhornia crassipes	Pontederiaceae	אייכהורניה עבת-רגל	S. America				invasive in water bodies
98	Einadia nutans	Amaranthaceae	אינדיה נטויה	Australia	intentional	after 1950	ornithochory	
99	Eleusine indica	Poaceae	דגנה הודית	Paleotropical		1935		
100	Elodea canadensis	Hydrocharitaceae	אלודאה קנדית	America				
101	Enchylaena tomentosa	Amaranthaceae	לחן לביד	Australia	intentional	after 1950	ornithochory	
102	Eragrostis echinochloidea	Poaceae	בן-חילף דמוי-דוחנית	S. Africa	accidental? (arrived with migrating birds?)	1980		invasive in the Arava Valley
103	Eragrostis japonica	Poaceae	בן-חילף מופסק	Paleotropical		1927		
104	Eragrostis palmeri	Poaceae	בן-חילף פלמר	America		1970		invasive in the coastline
105	Eragrostis prolifera	Poaceae	בן-חילף משגשג	Pantropical		1953		invasive in the coastline
106	Eragrostis sarmentosa	Poaceae	בן-חילף הביצות	S. Africa		1923		
107	Eragrostis tef	Poaceae	בן-חילף טף	cultivated (Africa)	intentional (food)			
108	Eragrostis virescens	Poaceae	בן-חילף ירקרק	S. America				
109	Eucalyptus camaldulensis	Myrtaceae	אקליפטוס המקור	Australia	intentional (forestation)	introd. 1884		planted by the JNF
110	Euphorbia cyathophora	Euphorbiaceae		America		2004		
111	Euphorbia graminea	Euphorbiaceae	חלבלוב דגני	C. America		2007		
112	Euphorbia heterophylla (E. geniculata)	Euphorbiaceae	חלבלוב קעור	America		1941		invasive in cotton fields
113	Euphorbia hirta	Euphorbiaceae	חלבלוב הכדורים	America		1924		
114	Euphorbia lasiocarpa	Euphorbiaceae	חלבלוב שעיר-פרי	America		1972		invasive in gardens
115	Euphorbia maculata (E. nutans)	Euphorbiaceae	חלבלוב נטוי	N. America		1940		
116	Euphorbia oblongata	Euphorbiaceae	חלבלוב מוארך	Mediterranean		2006		
117	Euphorbia prostrata	Euphorbiaceae	חלבלוב פושט	America		1948		invasive throughout Israel
118	Euphorbia serpens	Euphorbiaceae	חלבלוב זוחל	N. America		1940–1980		invasive throughout Israel
119	Euphorbia supina	Euphorbiaceae	חלבלוב מאדים	America		1974		
120	Falopia convolvulus	Polygonaceae	פלופיה חבלבלית	Europe		1982		
121	Ficus bengalensis	Moraceae	פיקוס בנגלי	Asia	intentional (ornamental)		ornithochory	invasive
122	Ficus benjamina	Moraceae	פיקוס השדרות	Asia	intentional (ornamental)		ornithochory	invasive
123	Ficus religiosa	Moraceae	פיקוס קדוש	Asia	intentional (ornamental)		ornithochory	invasive
124	Ficus sycomorus	Moraceae	פיקוס השקמה	Africa	intentional			
125	Galenia pubescens	Aizoaceae	גלניה שעירה	S. Africa		1970		
126	Galinsoga parviflora	Asteraceae	גלינסוגה קטנת-פרחים	S. America		1950		invasive
127	Gamochaeta pensylvanica	Asteraceae	לבדן פנסילבני	America		1985		
128	Guizotia abyssinica	Asteraceae	גיזוטיה צרת-עלים	Africa	intentional			
129	Gynandropsis gynandra	Capparaceae		Paleotropical				
130	Hedysarum coronarium	Fabaceae		Mediterranean		1986		
131	Helianthus annuus	Asteraceae	חמנית מצויה	N. America	accidental (arrived with fish food from the USA?)	1977		
132	Heliotropium curassavicum	Boraginaceae	עוקץ-עקרב בשרני	America				
133	Heterotheca subaxillaris	Asteraceae	טיונית החולות	N. America	intentional (dune stabilization)	introd. 1975	anemochory	invasive
134	Hordeum distichum	Poaceae	שעורה דו-טורית	cultivated	intentional (agriculture)			
135	Hordeum vulgare	Poaceae	שעורה תרבותית	cultivated	intentional (agriculture)			
136	Ipomoea coccinea	Convolvulaceae	לפופית מאדימה	N. America				
137	Ipomoea hederacea	Convolvulaceae	לפופית הקיסוס	America		1984		
138	Ipomoea indica	Convolvulaceae		Pantropical		1962		
139	Ipomoea pes-caprae	Convolvulaceae	לפופית רגל-העז	Paleotropical		1962		
140	Ipomoea triloba	Convolvulaceae	לפופית משולשת	America		1984		
141	Iris albicans	Iridaceae	אירוס לבנבן	Asia	intentional (ornamental)			planted in Muslim cemeteries
142	Lantana camara	Verbenaceae	לנטנה ססגונית	America	intentional (ornamental)		ornithochory	invasive
143	Lathyrus hirsutus	Fabaceae	טופח שעיר	Eurasia				
144	Lathyrus palustris	Fabaceae	טופח הביצות	Holoarctic		1999		
145	Lavatera arborea	Malvaceae	מעוג השיח	Mediterranean				
146	Lens culinaris	Fabaceae	עדשה תרבותית	cultivated	intentional (agriculture)			
147	Lepidium ruderale	Brassicaceae	שחליים עדינים	Eurasia				
148	Lepidium sativum	Brassicaceae	שחליים תרבותיים	Mediterranean	intentional			
149	Leptochloa mucronata	Poaceae	דו-מוץ חדוד	America				
150	Leptochloa uninervia	Poaceae	דו-מוץ מעורק	America				
151	Leucaena leucocephala	Fabaceae	צחר כחלחל	C. America	intentional (ornamental)			
152	Linum usitatissimum	Linaceae	פשתה תרבותית	cultivated	intentional (agriculture)			
153	Lonicera japonica	Caprifoliaceae	יערה יפנית	Asia	intentional (ornamental)		ornithochory	
154	Lupinus albus	Fabaceae	תורמוס תרבותי	cultivated (Mediterranean)	intentional (agriculture)			
155	Lupinus hispanicus	Fabaceae	תורמוס ספרדי	Mediterranean				
156	Maireana brevifolia	Amaranthaceae	מאירית קצרת-עלים	Australia	intentional (ornamental and forage)	1948		
157	Maireana sedifolia	Amaranthaceae	מאירית צוריתית	Australia		1980?		
158	Mantisalca salmantica	Asteraceae	מנטיסלקה מדברית	Mediterranean		1966		
159	Matthiola incana	Brassicaceae	מנתור אפור	Mediterranean				
160	Medicago sativa	Fabaceae	אספסת תרבותית	Eurasia	intentional (agriculture)			
161	Melia azedarach	Meliaceae	אזדרכת מצויה	Asia	intentional (ornamental)	introd. 1577	seed + vegetative, ornithochory	invasive
162	Mesembryanthemum acinacifolium	Aizoaceae	אהל האצבעות	Africa	intentional (ornamental)		vegetative	invasive in the coastline
163	Misopates calycinum	Plantaginaceae	לועית ארוכת-גביע	Mediterranean		1986		
164	Momordica balsamina	Cucurbitaceae	לעוסית מטפסת	Paleotropical		1884		
165	Morus alba	Moraceae	תות לבן	Asia	intentional (ornamental and food)		ornithochory	planted by the JNF
166	Najas guadalupensis	Hydrocharitaceae	ניידת גואדלופ	America				
167	Narcissus papyraceus	Amaryllidaceae	נרקיס מלבין	Mediterranean	intentional (ornamental)			
168	Nicandra physalodes	Solanaceae	ניקנדרה בוענית	America		1986		
169	Nicotiana glauca	Solanaceae	טבק השיח	S. America		introd. 1898		invasive throughout Israel
170	Nothoscordum inodorum	Alliaceae	אחישום מצוי	America		2004		
171	Oenothera biennis	Onagraceae	נר-הלילה הדו-שנתי	America		1989		
172	Oenothera drummondii	Onagraceae	נר-הלילה החופי	N. America		1912		
173	Oenothera laciniata	Onagraceae	נר-הלילה המפוצל	N. America		1985		
174	Oenothera rosea	Onagraceae	נר-הלילה הורוד	N. America	intentional (ornamental)	1890		
175	Opuntia ficus-indica	Cactaceae	צבר מצוי	C. America	intentional (fence plant)	1894		
176	Ornithogalum arabicum	Hyacinthaceae	נץ-חלב ערבי	Mediterranean	intentional (ornamental)			
177	Oxalis corniculata	Oxalidaceae	חמציץ קטן	Pantropical?		1906	seed	invasive, common in gardens and lawns
178	Oxalis stricta (O. europaea)	Oxalidaceae		N. America		1983		
179	Oxalis pes-caprae	Oxalidaceae	חמציץ נטוי	S. Africa	intentional	1906	vegetative only	invasive
180	Panicum antidotale	Poaceae	דוחן הערבה	Asia	intentional (forage crop)	1948		invasive in the Arava Valley
181	Panicum capillare	Poaceae	דוחן נימי	N. America		1924		invasive in gardens and agricultural fields
182	Panicum coloratum	Poaceae	דוחן מכחיל	Africa				
183	Panicum maximum	Poaceae	דוחן קיפח	Africa		1970		
184	Panicum miliaceum	Poaceae	דוחן תרבותי	Asia		1926		
185	Papaver somniferum	Papaveraceae	פרג תרבותי	Mediterranean	intentional (agriculture)			
186	Parkinsonia aculeata	Fabaceae	פרקינסוניה שיכנית	America	intentional			invasive
187	Parthenium hysterophorus	Asteraceae	פרתניון אפיל	America		1979-80		invasive
188	Paspalum dilatatum	Poaceae	פספלון מורחב	America	intentional (forage crop)	1970		invasive in wet habitats
189	Paspalum distichum	Poaceae	פספלון דו-טורי	America		1939		
190	Passiflora morifolia	Passifloraceae	שעונית התות	America	intentional	1984		
191	Pennisetum clandestinum	Poaceae	זיף-נוצה חבוי	America				
192	Pennisetum purpureum	Poaceae	זיף-נוצה ארגמני	Africa	intentional (ornamental)			
193	Phyllanthus rotundifolius	Euphorbiaceae	פילנתוס עגול-עלים	Paleotropical		1978		
194	Physalis angulata	Solanaceae	בוען מצולע	Africa		1977		
195	Physalis peruviana	Solanaceae	בוען נאכל	S. America				
196	Phytolacca americana	Phytolaccaceae	פיטולקה אמריקנית	N. America		1898	ornithochory	invasive in the Hulla Valley
197	Pimpinella anisum	Apiaceae	כמנון האניס	Mediterranean	intentional (spice)			
198	Pinus brutia	Pinaceae	אורן קפריסאי	Mediterranean	intentional (forestation)			planted by the JNF
199	Pinus pinea	Pinaceae	אורן הצנובר	Mediterranean	intentional (forestation)			planted by the JNF
200	Pistacia vera	Anacardiaceae	אלה אמיתית	Asia	intentional (food)			
201	Pistia stratiotes	Araceae		Pantropical				
202	Polygonum aviculare	Polygonaceae	ארכובית צרת-עלים	Eurasia				
203	Populus nigra	Salicaceae	צפצפה שחורה	Eurasia	intentional (ornamental)			
204	Prosopis juliflora	Fabaceae	ינבוט המסקיטו	America	intentional (ornamental)			
205	Punica granatum	Punicaceae	רימון מצוי	Asia	intentional (food)			
206	Reseda odorata	Resedaceae	רכפה ריחנית	Mediterranean				
207	Ricinus communis	Euphorbiaceae	קיקיון מצוי	Africa	intentional			invasive
208	Robinia pseudoacacia	Fabaceae	רוביניה בת-השיטה	N. America	intentional (ornamental)		anemochory	
209	Rorippa prostrata	Brassicaceae	רוריפה שרועה	Europe	accidental (arrived with bulbs imported from the Netherlands)	1984		
210	Rosmarinus officinalis	Lamiaceae	רוזמרין רפואי	Mediterranean	intentional (ornamental)			
211	Salix babylonica	Salicaceae	ערבת בבל	Asia	intentional (ornamental)			
212	Salvinia natans	Salviniaceae	סלביניה צפה	Eurasia	intentional (ornamental)	1988		
213	Sambucus nigra	Caprifoliaceae	סמבוק שחור	Eurasia		1925		
214	Schinus lentiscifolius	Anacardiaceae		S. America	intentional (ornamental)			
215	Schinus molle	Anacardiaceae	פלפלון רך	S. America	intentional (ornamental)	introd. 1920-30?		
216	Schinus terebinthifolius	Anacardiaceae	פלפלון דמוי-אלה	S. America	intentional (ornamental)		ornithochory	
217	Schoenefeldia gracilis	Poaceae	שנפלדיה עדינה	Paleotropical		1998		
218	Secale cereale	Poaceae	שיפון תרבותי	cultivated	intentional (agriculture)			
219	Senna obtusifolia (Cassia obtusifolia)	Fabaceae	סנא קהה	Paleotropical		1985		
220	Sesbania sesban	Fabaceae	ססבניה מצרית	Paleotropical	intentional			invasive mostly in the Jordan Valley
221	Setaria adhaerens	Poaceae	זיפן מצוי	Mediterranean		1911		invasive
222	Setaria glauca	Poaceae	זיפן כחלחל	Paleotropical		1929		invasive
223	Setaria verticillata	Poaceae	זיפן הדורים	Mediterranean		1996		invasive
224	Setaria viridis	Poaceae	זיפן ירוק	Europe		1922		invasive
225	Sida acuta	Malvaceae	סידה מחודדת	C. America		1980		
230	Solanum crinitum	Solanaceae	סולנום גדול	S. America		1999		
226	Solanum cornutum	Solanaceae	סולנום המקור	America	accidental	1953		
227	Solanum dulcamara	Solanaceae	סולנום עדין	Europe		1983		
228	Solanum elaeagnifolium	Solanaceae	סולנום זיתני	N. America	accidental	1957		invasive
229	Solanum laciniatum	Solanaceae	סולנום שסוע	Australia		1985		
231	Sorghum virgatum	Poaceae	דורה רותמית	Africa		1922		invasive in cotton fields and gardens
232	Sporobolus indicus	Poaceae	מדחול הודי	widely distributed				
233	Sternbergia lutea	Amaryllidaceae	חלמונית צהובה	Mediterranean	intentional (ornamental)			
234	Stipa papposa	Poaceae	מלעניאל הציצית	S. America				
235	Tagetes minuta	Asteraceae	טגטס קטן	S. America	intentional	1970		invasive
236	Tamarix chinensis	Tamaricaceae	אשל סיני	Asia				
237	Tetragonia tetragonioides	Aizoaceae	רבועה שרועה	America		1932		
238	Tipuana tipu	Fabaceae	מכנף נאה	America	intentional (ornamental)		anemochory	
239	Trianthema portulacastrum	Aizoaceae	שלשי רגלני	S. America		1967		invasive
240	Trifolium alexandrinum	Fabaceae	תלתן אלכסנדרוני	cultivated				
241	Trigonella foenum-graecum	Fabaceae	גרגרנית החילבה	cultivated	intentional (agriculture)			
242	Triticum aestivum	Poaceae	חיטה רכה	cultivated	intentional (agriculture)			
243	Triticum durum	Poaceae	חיטה קשה	cultivated	intentional (agriculture)			
244	Tropaeolum majus	Tropaeolaceae	כובע הנזיר	cultivated (S. America)	intentional (ornamental)		vegetative	invasive
245	Urochloa panicoides	Poaceae	נסמנית הדוחן	Africa		1998		
246	Urochloa texana	Poaceae	נסמנית טקסס	N. America		1989		
247	Verbesina encelioides	Asteraceae	כנפון זהוב	N. America		1971		invasive
248	Vicia benghalensis	Fabaceae	בקיה ארגמנית	Mediterranean	intentional	1941		
249	Washingtonia filifera	Arecaceae	ושינגטוניה חוטית	N. America	intentional (ornamental)	c. 1900	ornithochory	
250	Washingtonia robusta	Arecaceae	ושינגטוניה חסונה	America	intentional (ornamental)		ornithochory	
251	Xanthium italicum	Asteraceae	לכיד איטלקי	America		before 1950		
252	Xanthium spinosum	Asteraceae	לכיד קוצני	S. America		1912		
253	Xanthium strumarium	Asteraceae	לכיד הנחלים	America		1921		invasive in wet habitats and cotton fields

== Questionable native distribution ==
	Binomial name	Family	Hebrew name	Native distribution	First record in Israel	Propagation strategies in Israel	Notes
254	Aloe vera	Asphodelaceae	אלוי אמיתי	Mediterranean			
255	Celtis australis	Cannabaceae	מיש דרומי	Mediterranean			
256	Dalbergia sissoo	Fabaceae	סיסם הודי	Asia	1985	anemochory	common as ornamental plant
257	Elaeagnus angustifolia	Elaeagnaceae	יצהרון מכסיף	Eurasia			
258	Ipomoea cairica	Convolvulaceae	לפופית כפנית	Paleotropical	1875		common as ornamental plant
259	Prunus dulcis	Rosaceae	שקד מצוי	Middle East	ancient		widely grown in cultivation

== See also ==
- List of endemic flora of Israel
- Wildlife of Israel
- Tourism in Israel
- Jerusalem Botanical Gardens
- Wild edible plants of Israel and Palestine
