= Prostrate pigweed =

Prostrate pigweed is a common name for several plants and may refer to:

- Amaranthus albus
- Amaranthus blitoides
