= Biodiversity of Israel and Palestine =

The biodiversity of Israel and Palestine is the fauna, flora and fungi of the geographical region of Israel and of Palestine (the West Bank and the Gaza Strip). This geographical area within the historical region of Palestine extends from the Jordan River and Wadi Araba in the east, to the Mediterranean Sea and the Sinai desert in the west, to Lebanon in the north, and to the gulf of Aqaba, or Eilat in the south.

The area is part of the Palearctic realm, located in the Mediterranean Basin, whose climate supports the Mediterranean forests, woodlands, and scrub biome. This includes the Eastern Mediterranean conifer-sclerophyllous-broadleaf forests and the Southern Anatolian montane conifer and deciduous forests ecoregions.

There are five geographical zones and the climate varies from semi-arid to temperate to subtropical. The region is home to a variety of plants and animals; at least 47,000 living species have been identified, with another 4,000 assumed to exist. At least 116 mammal species are native to Palestine/Israel, as well as 511 bird species, 97 reptile species, and 7 amphibian species. There are also an estimated 2,780 plant species.

== Geography ==
The region of Palestine with the Gaza Strip, Israel, and the West Bank are located at the eastern end of the Mediterranean Sea, traditionally called the Levant. Israel is bounded on the north by Lebanon and on the northeast by Syria. Jordan lies to the east and southeast of the West Bank and Israel; Israel and the Gaza Strip are bordered on the southwest by the Egyptian Sinai Peninsula and on the west by the Mediterranean Sea.

=== Climate ===
The region is divided into three major climate zones, and one microclimate zone:

1. The Mediterranean climate zone, characterized by long, hot, rainless summers and relatively short, cool, rainy winters. The rainfall may go from as much as 400 mm for a year (in the south around Gaza), to 1,200 mm for a year (in the northernmost end of Israel). The Mediterranean landscapes include several kinds of forest, garrigue, scrubland, marsh and savanna-like-grassland. The fauna and flora are mostly of European origin.
2. The steppe climate zone. It is a narrow strip (no wider than 60 km, and mostly, much narrower) between the Mediterranean zone and the Desert zone. The rainfall varies from 400 mm for year to 200 mm for year. This climate zone includes mostly low-grasslands and hardy forms of scrub. The fauna and flora are mostly of Asian and Saharan origin.
3. The desert climate zone, which is the largest climate zone of Israel and Palestine, covers the country's southern half as the Negev, while the Judean Desert extends to the Dead Sea region through the West Bank and into the southern Jordan Valley. Rainfall is as low as 32 mm per year in the southernmost tip of Palestine/Israel in the Arabah valley. This dry climate zone grows scattered shrub vegetation or desert-grassland in its wetter parts. In the more arid regions, the vegetation is confined to dry riverbeds and gullies, known as wadis and in some places it is almost absent. In some of the greater valleys, desert-scrub and acacia-woodland are to be found. The fauna and flora are mostly of Saharan origin. Sudanese flora is present as well.
4. The tropical (Sudanese) microclimate by the springs of the Judean Desert. Refers mostly to Ein Gedi spring and Arugot creek. Due to the high aquifer in the region, and the steady, hot climate of the Judean Desert, a tropical savanna-related flora (not rainforest, as many think) of East-African origin has established in the area of the springs. The fauna is that of the Desert zone.

The climate is determined by the location between the subtropical aridity of the Sahara and the Arabian deserts, and the subtropical humidity of the Levant or eastern Mediterranean. The climate conditions are highly variable within the area and modified locally by altitude, latitude, and the proximity to the Mediterranean Sea.

== Threats to biodiversity ==
=== Border walls ===
Recent hardening of Israel's borders, including construction of fences and walls in the West Bank beginning in 2003 in response to the Second Intifada, have impeded movement of large vertebrates such as gazelles and contributed to overgrazing by Palestinians in the West Bank by limiting the land area available to herders. Walls have also changed the flow of water, harming amphibian populations.

=== Population growth and development ===
The population of former Mandatory Palestine has increased since the 1922 census from 757,000 to more than 15 million today. With this population growth came massive urban, agricultural, and industrial development, along with afforestation, transforming much of the landscape and polluting the environment. These processes continue to this day, with numerous development projects increasing urban area and straining local ecosystems. Israel's world-leading water conservation and desalination programs have reduced pressure on the Jordan River, seasonal streams, and aquifers over the last few decades, though overexploitation remains a problem.

=== Hunting ===
Several large vertebrate species were extirpated by hunters during the British Mandate era, including four ungulates: the roe deer (Capreolus capreolus), the fallow deer (Dama dama mesopotamica), the Arabian oryx (Oryx leucoryx) and the onager or wild ass (Equus hemionus); two predators: the Syrian bear (Ursus arctos syriacus) and the cheetah (Acinonyx jubatus), and also one species of bird, the ostrich (Strutio camelus) and, one reptile the Nile crocodile (Crocodilus niloticus). Four of these species (roe and fallow deer, wild ass, and Arabian oryx) were returned to the wild in Israel by the Israel Nature and Parks Authority (INPA) in the 1980s and 1990s. Many other species were severely reduced in number by hunting and have rebounded since the late 1970s.

== Online databases ==
The following are online well prepared databases about the biodiversity in the Palestine Israel area.

- Flora of Israel Online, Hebrew University, Jerusalem
- BioGIS: Israel Biodiversity Information System
- Botanical Garden University E Book
- Biodiversity of Jordan and Israel

=== Articles ===
- Bird Species in Israel

=== Societies ===
- Palestine Wildlife Society (Palestine Wildlife Society)
- Israel Nature and National Parks Protection Authority

=== Bird watching ===
- Birding Israel: the world of birds, birding tours and birdwatching in Israel
- International Center for the Study of Bird Migration
- The Israeli Center for Yardbirds
- Jerusalem Bird Observatory (Jerusalem Bird Observatory)

=== Photographers ===
- Rittner Oz: Amazing collection of great images of small creatures in the area with fine scientific classification
- Ilia Shalamaev: Excellent photographs of wildlife in the area
- Vadim Onishchenko
- The Edge: A searchable collection of nature photos. Search for Palestine, Israel in the database. Site created by Niall Benvie

=== Neighbouring countries ===
- The Arabian Oryx Website

== Selected images ==
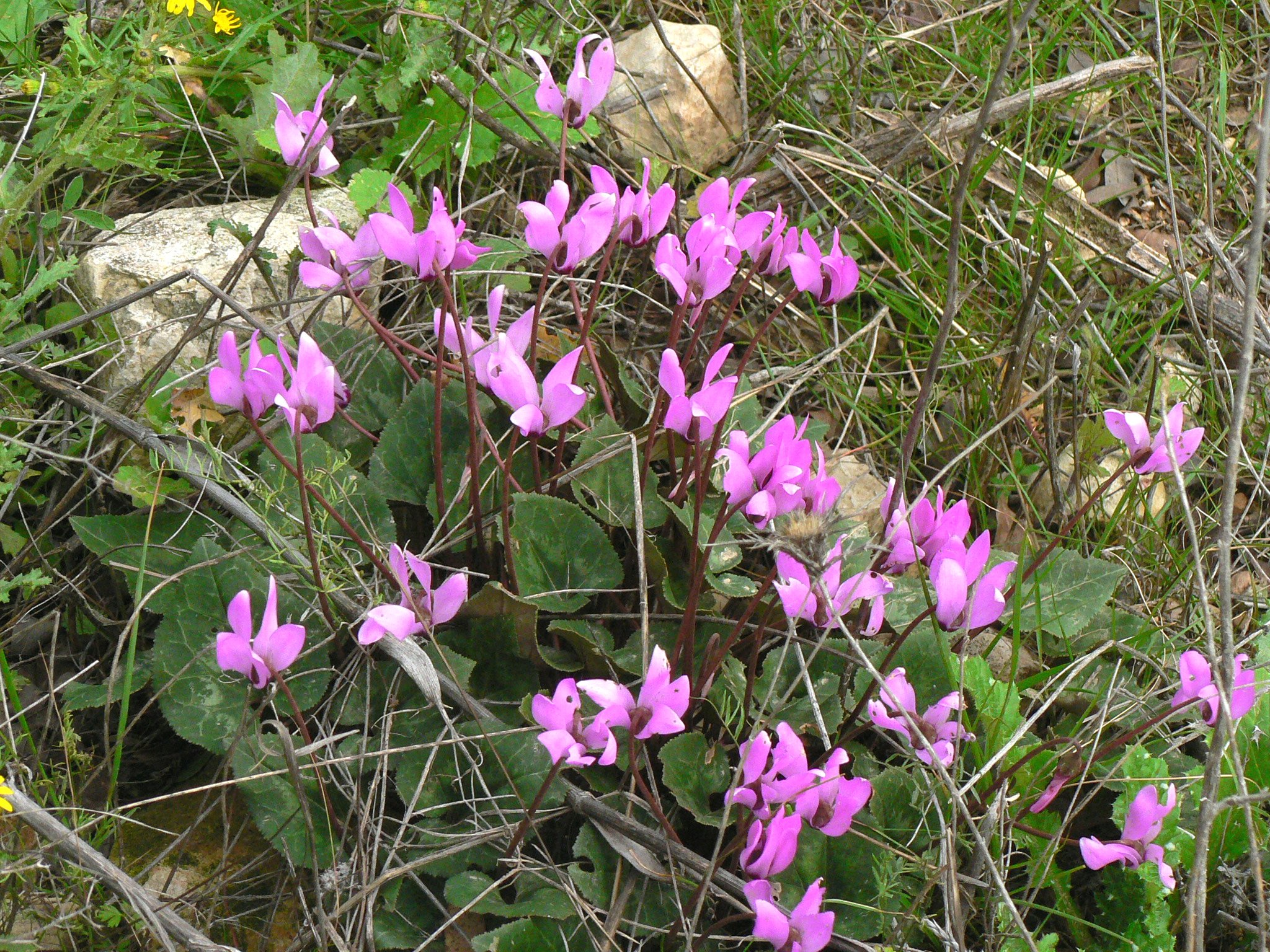
Cyclamen persicum

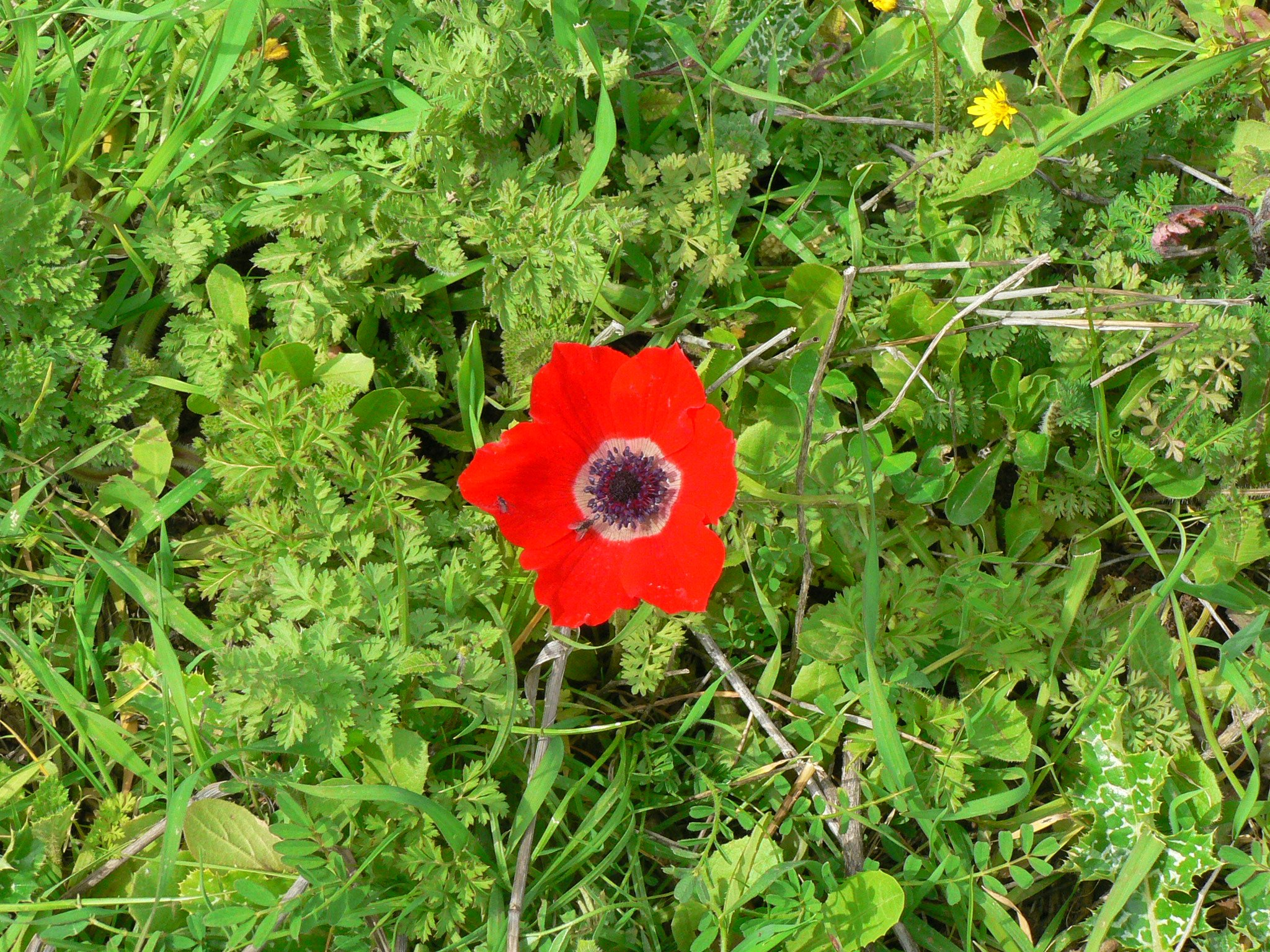
Anemone coronaria

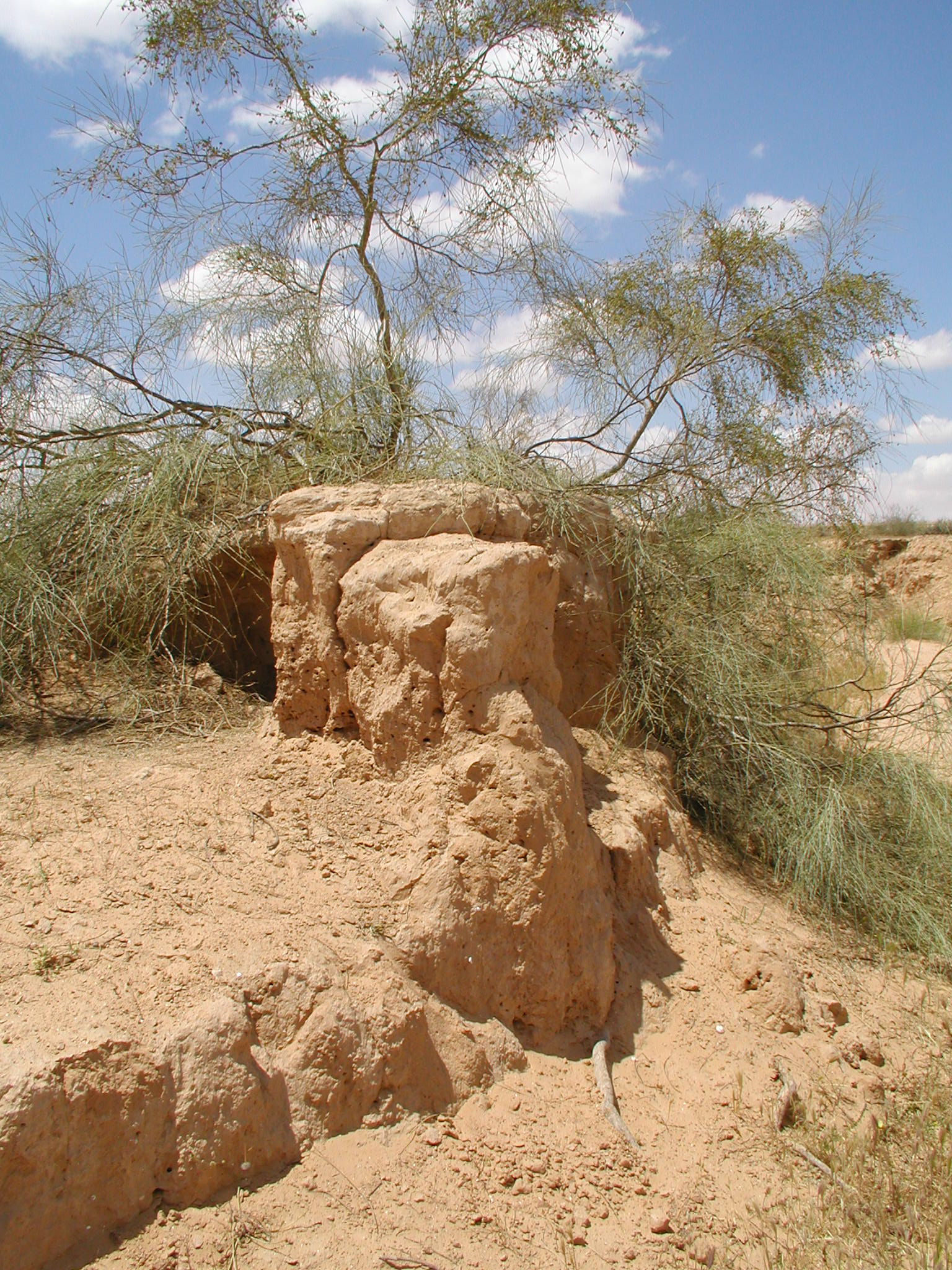
Haloxylon persicum

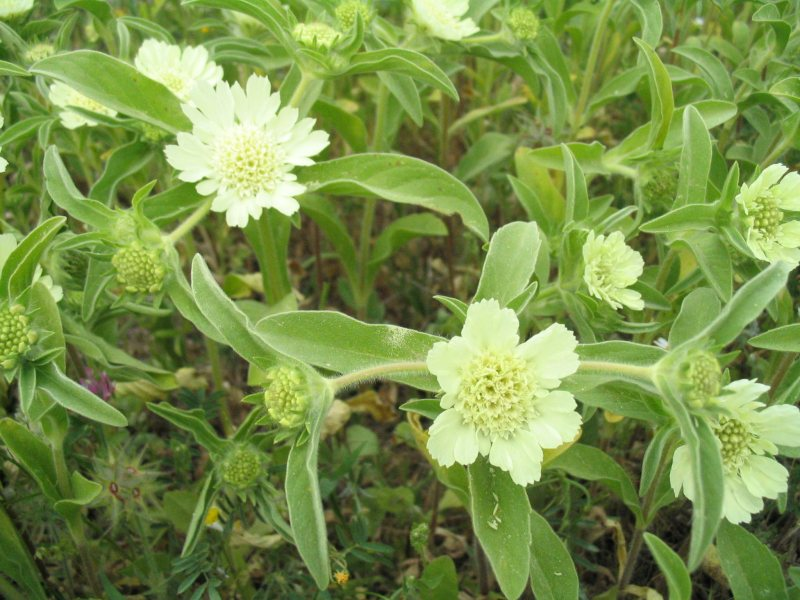
Scabiosa prolifera

== See also ==
- List of native plants of Flora Palaestina (A–B)
- List of native plants of Flora Palaestina (C–D)
- List of native plants of Flora Palaestina (E–O)
- List of native plants of Flora Palaestina (P–Z)
- List of adventive wild plants in Israel
- Wild edible plants of Israel and Palestine
- Wildlife of Israel
- List of rivers of Israel
