= Potato tree =

Potato tree is a common name which may refer to several large species of nightshade (genus Solanum), especially:

- Solanum crinitum (syn. Solanum macranthum), the giant star potato tree
- Solanum crispum, the Chilean potato tree
- Solanum erianthum, the potato tree
- Solanum wrightii, the Brazilian potato tree
