= Palestine Wildlife Society =

Palestine conservation organization

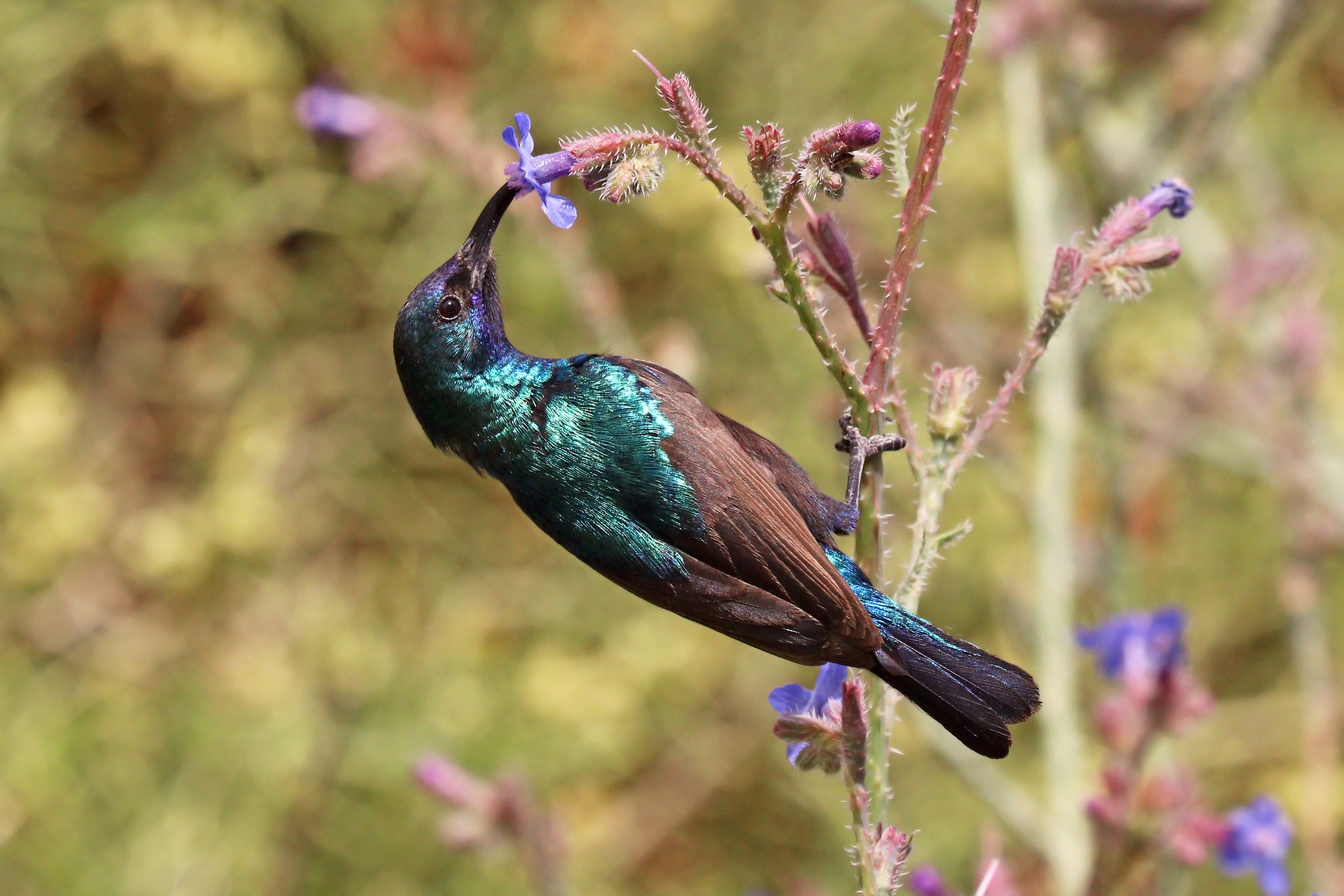
- The Palestine sunbird is the national bird of the Palestinian Authority.
- Abbreviation: PWLS
- Formation: 1999
- Purpose: Conservation and enhancement of Palestinian biodiversity and wildlife
- Headquarters: Beit Sahour
- Region served: Palestine
- Affiliations: BirdLife International
- Website: www.wildlife-pal.org/en

The Palestine Wildlife Society (PWLS; Arabic: جمعية الحياة البرية في فلسطين, romanized: Jamʻīyat al-Ḥayāh al-Barīyah fī Filasṭīn) is a non-profit organisation founded in Palestine that focusses on wildlife conservation through research, education and the protection of habitat, and promotes ecological sustainability. It was founded in 1999 with the slogan “Together for Humans and Nature” and is a partner organisation of BirdLife International.

The PWLS participates in BirdLife International's Important Bird Areas (IBAs) program. IBAs in Palestine include:

- East Jerusalem
- Ein Feshkha
- Ein Qiniya
- Jericho
- Nabi Salih
- Wadi Gaza Nature Reserve
- Wadi Qelt
- Umm ar-Rihan
- Umm Safa
