= Wadi Gaza Nature Reserve =

Nature reserve in the Gaza Strip, Palestine

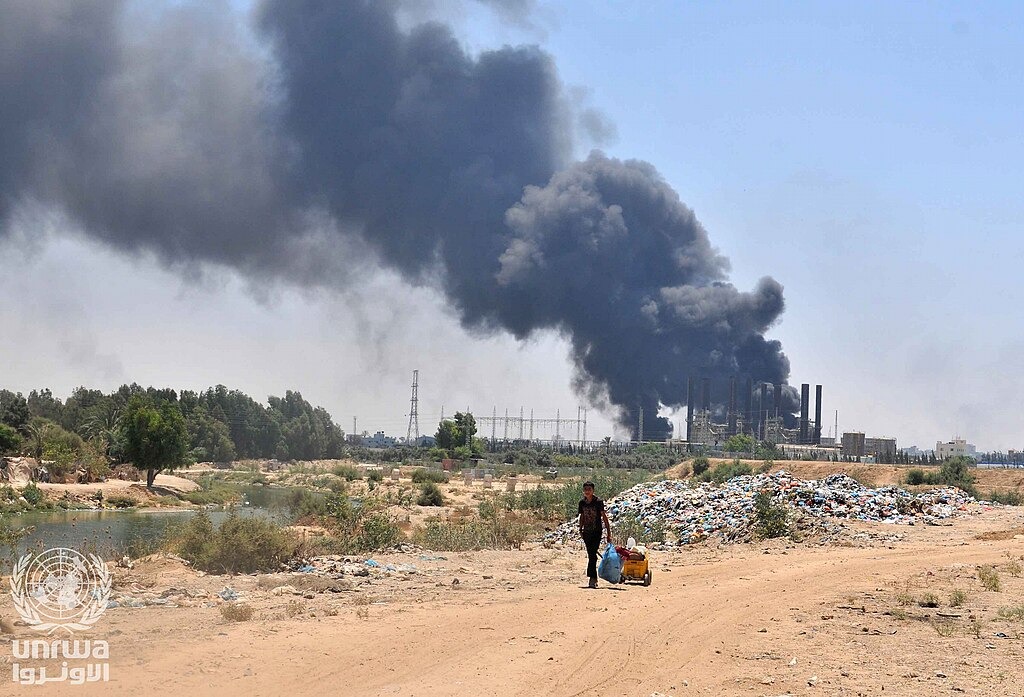
The Wadi Gaza near Gaza's only powerplant in 2014 during the 2014 Gaza War

The Wadi Gaza Nature Reserve (Arabic: محمية وادي غزة الطبيعية) was declared a nature reserve by the Environment Quality Authority of Palestinian Authority in June 2000. It is confined to the course of the Wadi Gaza and its floodplain and banks within the Gaza Strip.

Earlier Wadi Gaza was recognized as an Important Bird Area, being a stop-off point on a major migration flyway during bird migrations between the north Palaearctic and Africa.

Wadi Gaza Coastal Wetlands are on the tentative list (submitted in April 2012) for inclusion into the UNESCO's World Heritage List.

The need for the protection of the area was first documented in 1998. The subsequent survey work identified the extent of the needed protection of the unique habitats in the area. The initially selected area included wider land strips around the Wadi, but under the pressure of the local opposition, the protection was assigned to a much more restricted area.

The area is the only coastal wetland in Gaza with unique biological diversity and one of the few wetlands on the easternmost Mediterranean coast, under pressure on its landscape due to human activities and land development.

The route of Wadi Gaza across the Gaza Strip is about 9 km of the total length of 105 km. The route has eight major changes in its track within the Gaza Strip. Its width within Gaza varies between 20 and 270m, the widest place is by the mouth located approximately at 31.464057°N 34.376179°E.

From the north, the Wadi is bounded by lands of the local authorities of Al-Zahra', Al-Mughraqa, and Wadi Gaza village council. From the south, it is bounded by the refugee camps of Nuseirat and Bureij.

== Bibliography ==
- Forey, Samuel (2023-10-07), "En Palestine, la renaissance d'un cours d'eau après vingt ans d'efforts", Le Monde (in French)
