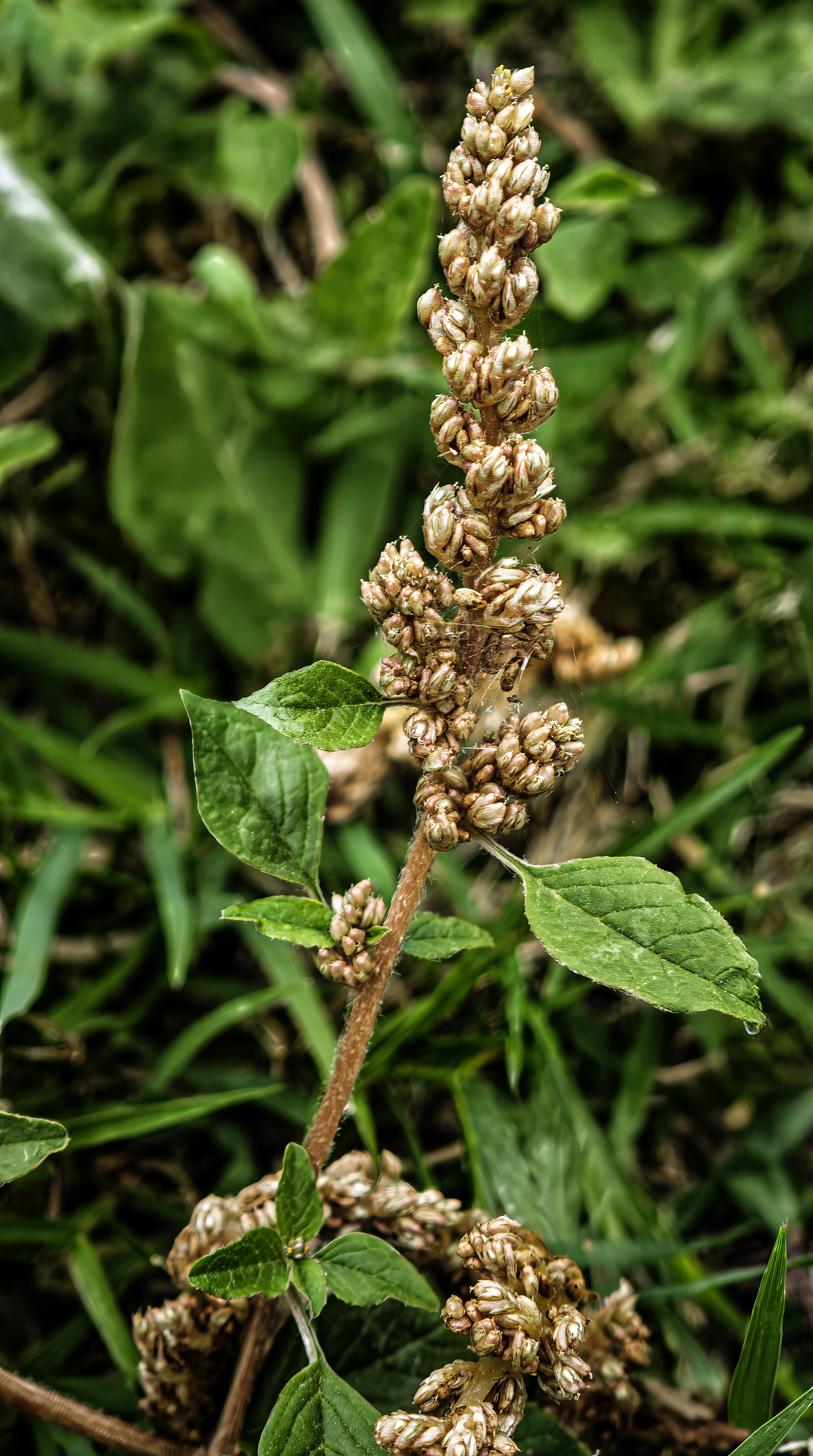

Scientific classification
- Kingdom: Plantae
- Clade: Tracheophytes
- Clade: Angiosperms
- Clade: Eudicots
- Order: Caryophyllales
- Family: Amaranthaceae
- Genus: Amaranthus
- Species: A. deflexus

Binomial name
- Amaranthus deflexus L.

= Amaranthus deflexus =

Species of flowering plant

Amaranthus deflexus is also known by the common names low amaranth, Argentina amaranth, perennial pigweed, and large-fruit amaranth. It is native to South America, and has been introduced to many other parts of the world. It is a short-lived perennial or annual plant. The plant can grow up to 1.5 ft (0.5 m) in height.

It flowers in the summer to fall. It has been introduced into many warm or temperate regions of the globe. It grows best in weedy areas or in disturbed habitats.

A natural hybrid of Amaranthus deflexus and Amaranthus muricatus has been described in Europe, and is known as Amaranthus × tarraconensis.
