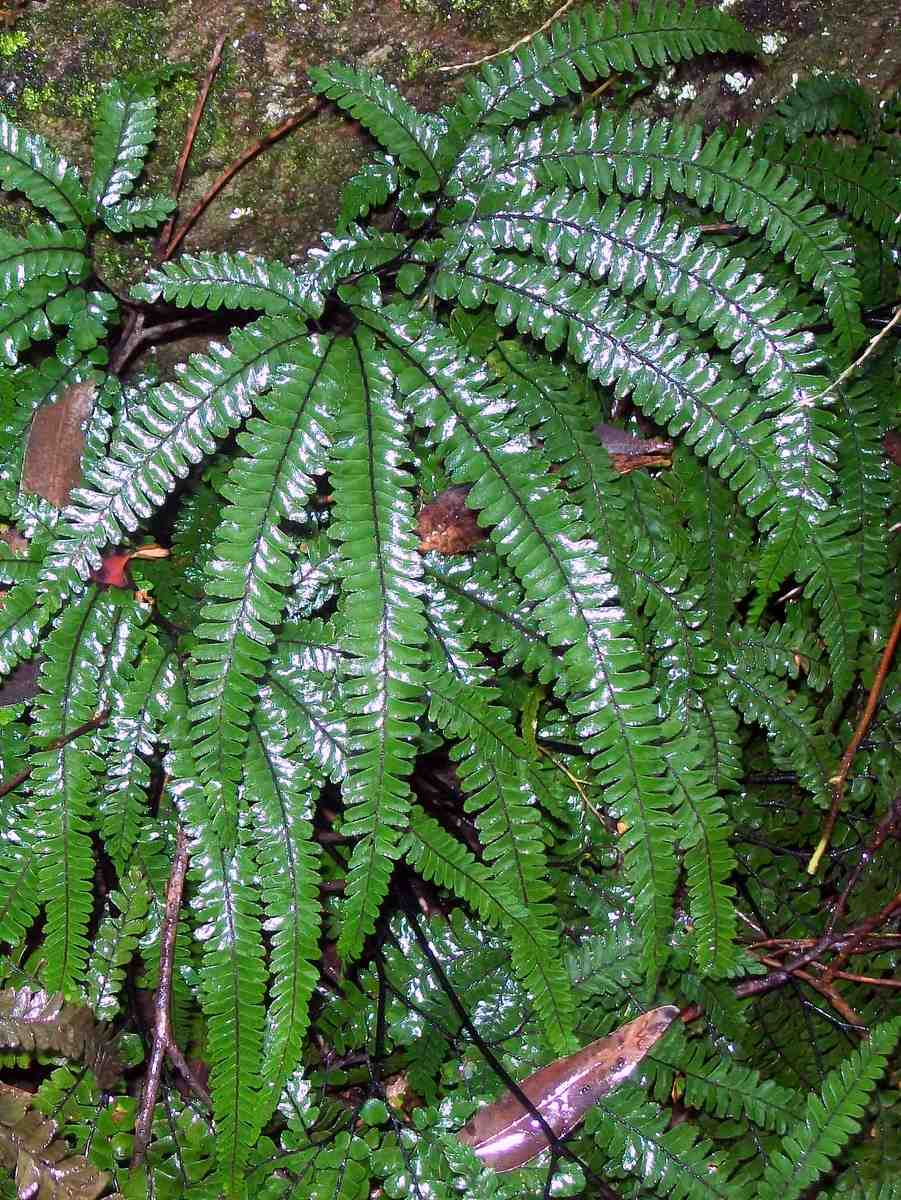
- In Chatswood West, Australia

Scientific classification
- Kingdom: Plantae
- Clade: Tracheophytes
- Division: Polypodiophyta
- Class: Polypodiopsida
- Order: Polypodiales
- Family: Pteridaceae
- Genus: Adiantum
- Species: A. hispidulum

Binomial name
- Adiantum hispidulum Sw.

Synonyms
- Adiantum hispidulum var. glabratum Domin; Adiantum hispidulum var. normale Domin

= Adiantum hispidulum =

Rough maidenhair fern

Species of fern

Adiantum hispidulum, commonly known as rough maidenhair fern or five-fingered jack, is a small fern in the family Pteridaceae of widespread distribution. It is found in Africa, Australia, Polynesia, Malesia, New Zealand and other Pacific Islands. Its fronds rise in clumps from rhizomes among rocks or in the soil in sheltered areas.

== Taxonomy ==
Adiantum hispidulum was first described by Swedish botanist Olof Swartz in 1802. Its species name is derived from the Latin hispis "hair" and means "minutely hairy". Five-fingered jack is an alternative vernacular name.

== Description ==
Adiantum hispidulum grows in tufts or clumps among rocks or from the ground, its fronds arising from the short dark clumped rhizomes. The dark stalk measures up to 45 centimetres (18 in) in length. The fronds are divided into long and short narrow triangular or elliptic pinnae (leafy branches), each of which is divided again into smaller roughly rectangular, diamond-, or fan-shaped pinnules. Each pinnule may have 1 to 20 spore clusters along its margins underneath. Young growth may have a pinkish tinge before it matures into the dark green foliage.

== Distribution and habitat ==
The species ranges from tropical Eastern Africa, including South Africa, Mozambique, Malawi, Kenya and Tanzania, as well as Madagascar and the Comoros, Mauritius, to Asia through Malesia to all states of Australia (with the exception of Tasmania), as well as New Zealand and Pacific islands. A common plant, Adiantum hispidulum is often seen growing in moist areas. In Australia it is found near rocks, in rainforest or open forest.

Apart from its native range, it has naturalized in Macaronesia (the Azores, Madeira and Canary Islands), the Southeastern United States and Hawaii.

== Cultivation ==
Adiantum hispidulum is grown as an ornamental plant that adapts readily to cultivation, although may be slow growing. It is more tolerant of sun and drying out than other fern species. According to the Royal Horticultural Society Adiantum hispidulum is hardy down to −5 to −10 °C (23 to 14 °F).
