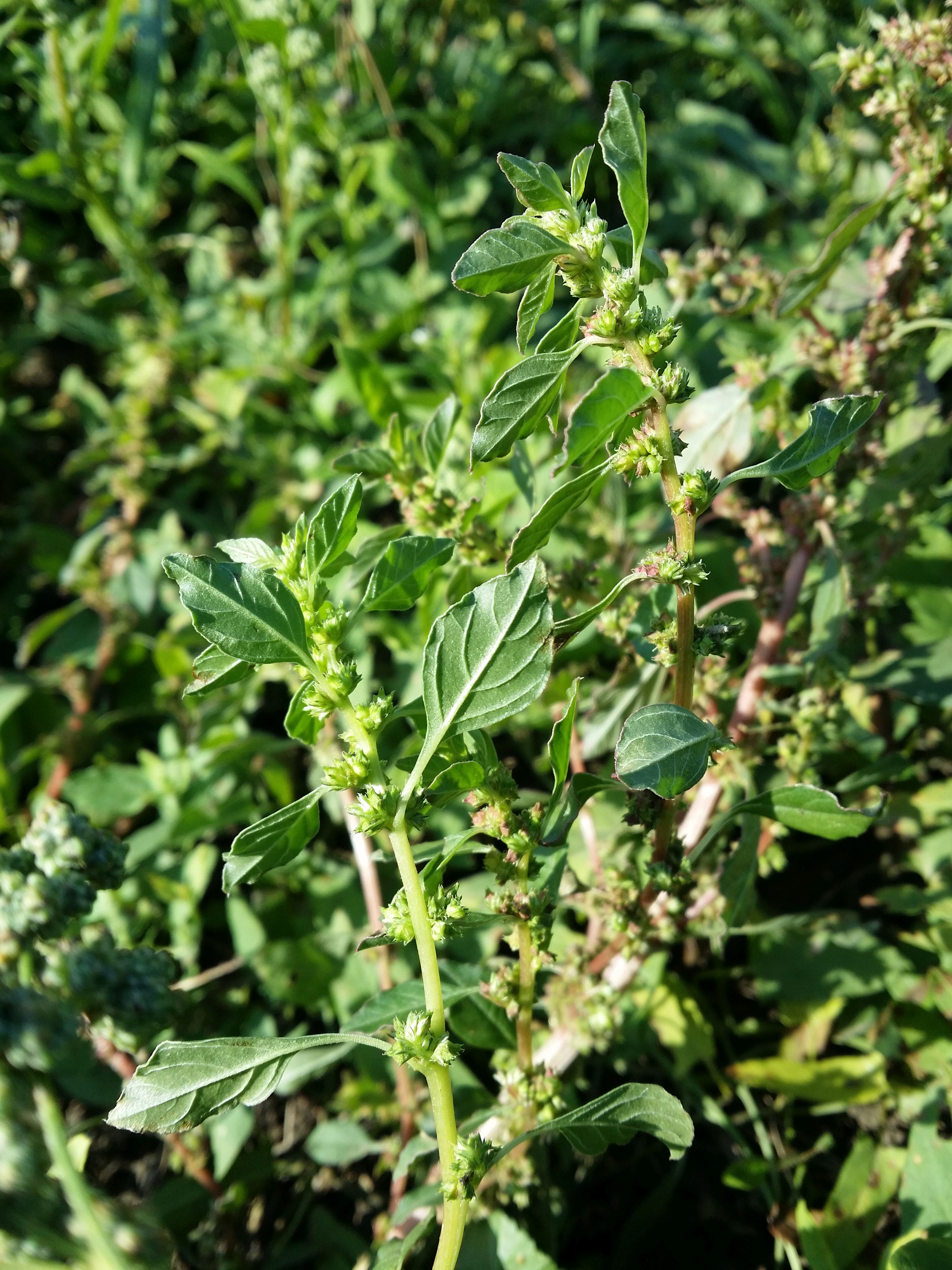

Scientific classification
- Kingdom: Plantae
- Clade: Tracheophytes
- Clade: Angiosperms
- Clade: Eudicots
- Order: Caryophyllales
- Family: Amaranthaceae
- Genus: Amaranthus
- Species: A. graecizans

Binomial name
- Amaranthus graecizans L.

Subspecies
- Amaranthus graecizans subsp. graecizans; Amaranthus graecizans subsp. aschersonianus (Thell.) Costea, D.M.Brenner & Tardif; Amaranthus graecizans subsp. silvestris (Vill.) Brenan; Amaranthus graecizans subsp. thellungianus (Nevski) Gusev

Synonyms
- Amaranthus angustifolius Lam.; Blitum graecizans (L.) Moench; Glomeraria graecizans (L.) Cav.; Amaranthus blitum var. graecizans (L.) Moq.; Amaranthus viridis subsp. graecizans (L.) Nyman; Amaranthus graecizans var. normalis Kuntze; Galliaria graecizans (L.) Nieuwl.; Amaranthus angustifolius var. graecizans (L.) Thell.; Amaranthus angustifolius subsp. graecizans (L.) Maire & Weiller

= Amaranthus graecizans =

Species of flowering plant

Amaranthus graecizans, the Mediterranean amaranth or short-tepalled pigweed, is an annual species in the botanical family Amaranthaceae. It is native to Africa, southern Europe, East Asia to India and Central Asia. It is naturalized in North America. More general common names include tumbleweed and pigweed.

== Description ==
Amaranthus graecizans is an annual herb that grows up to 50 centimetres (20 inches) tall. Stems are branched from base, glabrous or covered with crisped hairs. The flowers are unisexual and are yellow with round black seeds that are 1–1.25 mm.

== Habitat ==
Amaranthus graecizans grows in warm temperate zones where it can be found at elevations up to 2,400 metres (7,900 feet). It grows rapidly after rain and can be found on disturbed ground in the vicinity of human and livestock settlements as well as seasonally flooded sandy flats.

== Uses ==
The edible leaves are used as a vegetable throughout Africa and the Middle East. It can be eaten raw, but was more often cooked, or added to sauces and stews. A common way to cook Amaranthus graecizans was to cook it in buttermilk, or to squeeze fresh lime-juice over it. The seeds are starchy and can also be eaten

Leaves, stems and seeds may be eaten raw and cooked, the leaves have a high nutritional value. When grown on nitrogen-rich soils they are known to concentrate nitrates in the leaves, especially noticeable on land where nitrate fertilizer is used.
