= Solanum crinitum =

Scientific classification
- Kingdom: Plantae
- Clade: Tracheophytes
- Clade: Angiosperms
- Clade: Eudicots
- Clade: Asterids
- Order: Solanales
- Family: Solanaceae
- Genus: Solanum
- Species: S. crinitum

Binomial name
- Solanum crinitum Lam.

Species of tropical tree

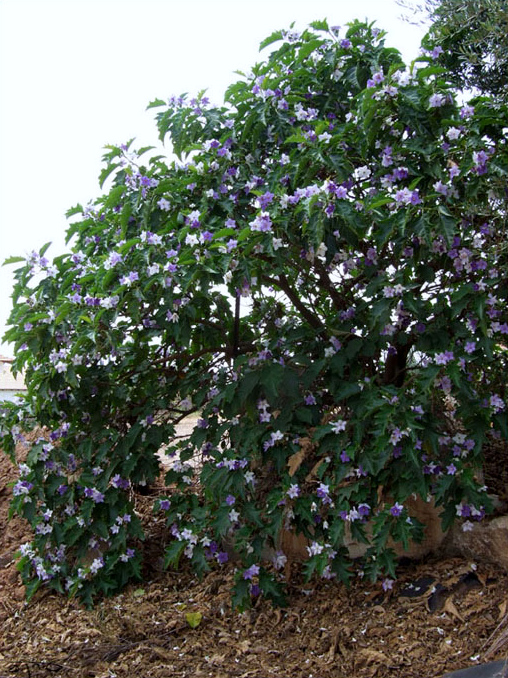
Solanum macranthum 3

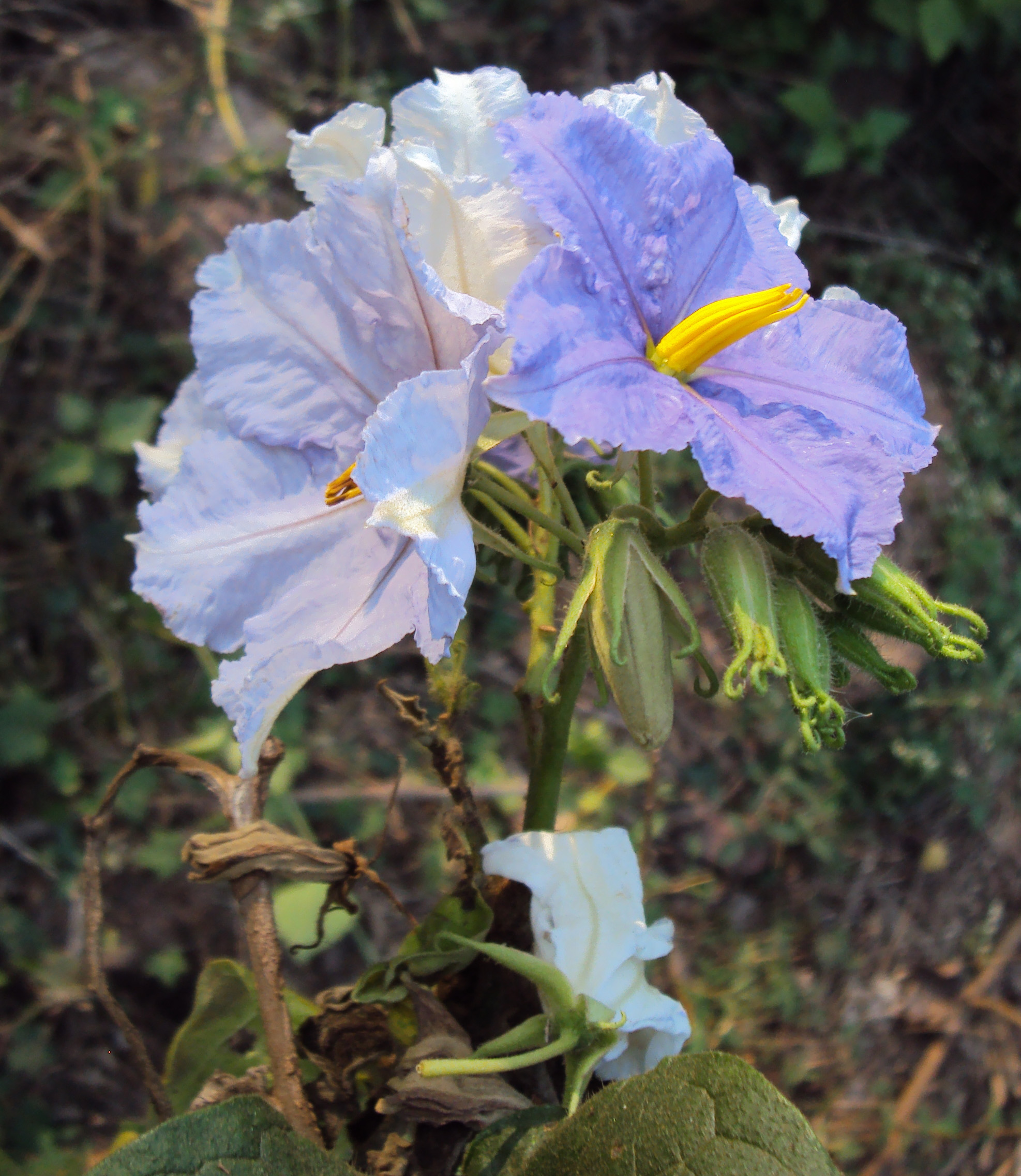
Solanum macranthum 23

Solanum crinitum, syn. Solanum macranthum, common name giant star potato tree, is a small tropical tree belonging to the family Solanaceae, growing to 12 m (39 ft) tall, native to the northeastern half of South America.

Its flowers continue to grow bigger even after they open, doubling in size, and eventually becoming 5 cm (2.0 in) wide. Simultaneously with this, the flowers also change color, opening purple and becoming white. It is very short-lived for a tree-sized plant, being full-grown at age four, and often dead by its fifth year. If pollinated, the flowers produce a round, orange fruit about 5 cm (2.0 in) diameter. The 5- to 7-lobed leaves are about 40 cm (16 in) long and about half as wide.
