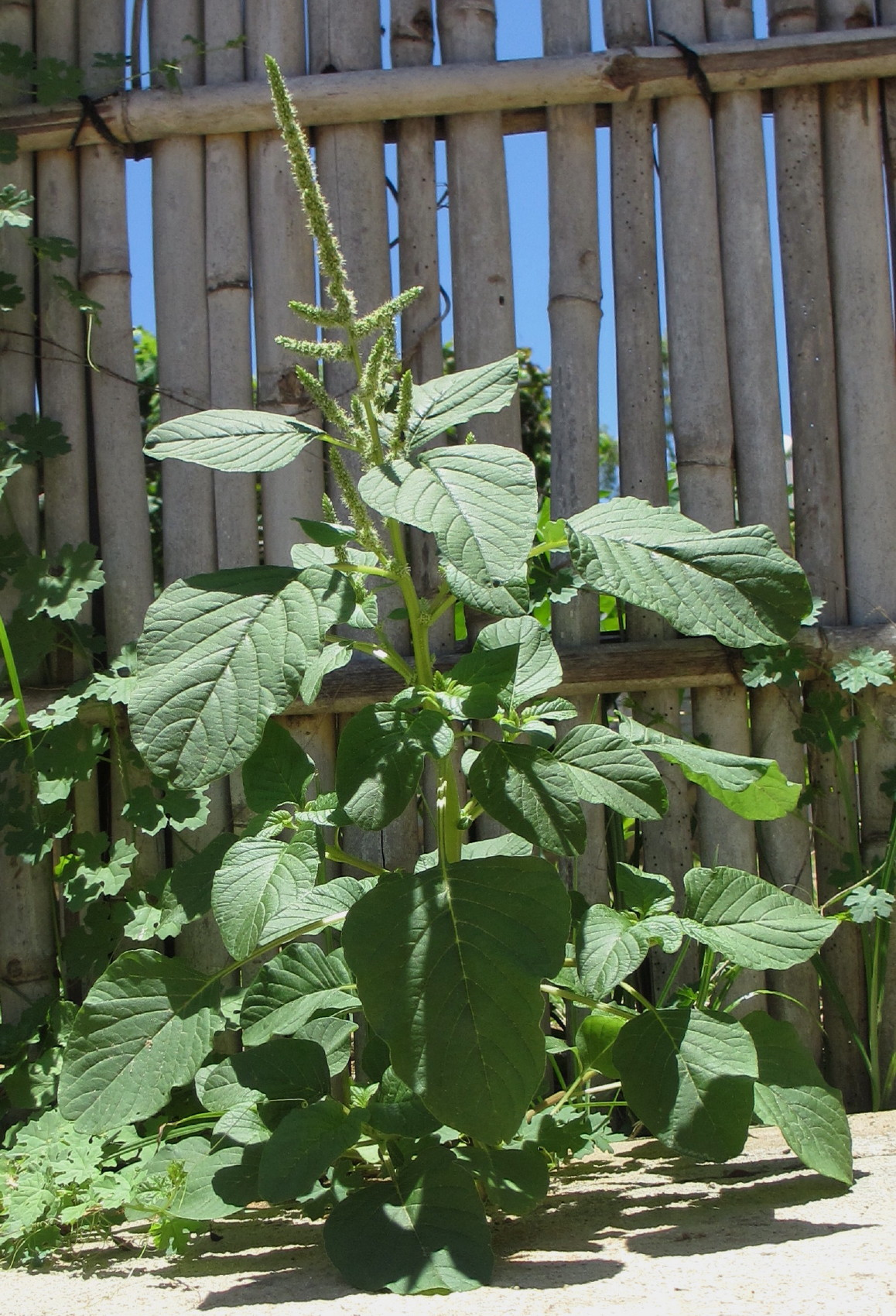

Scientific classification
- Kingdom: Plantae
- Clade: Tracheophytes
- Clade: Angiosperms
- Clade: Eudicots
- Order: Caryophyllales
- Family: Amaranthaceae
- Genus: Amaranthus
- Species: A. blitum

Binomial name
- Amaranthus blitum L.

= Amaranthus blitum =

Species of flowering plant

Amaranthus blitum, commonly called purple amaranth or Guernsey pigweed, is an annual plant species in the economically important plant family Amaranthaceae. It has a number of culinary uses.

== Description ==
Amaranthus blitum is an erect or semi-prostrate annual plant. The single or branched stem can grow to 1 metre (3 1/2 ft) tall. The green or purplish leaves are up to 10 centimetres (4 in) long on stalks of a similar length and are arranged spirally. They are simple, roughly triangular in shape and have entire margins.

The inflorescence is a spike with the tiny male and female flowers clustered together. The fruits are small globular capsules containing disc-shaped seeds.

=== Related plants ===
Amaranthus viridis, the slender amaranth or green amaranth, is closely related and edible.

== Distribution and habitat ==
Native to the Mediterranean region, it is naturalized in other parts of the world, including much of eastern North America, much of tropical Africa, Western Europe and Japan. In Britain it was first recorded in the wild in 1771 when it appeared in Essex. It occurred more frequently in scattered locations in southern England in the 19th century but has since decreased. It is established in Guernsey and elsewhere as a casual plant, springing up on waste ground, rubbish tips and cultivated areas, probably from wool waste, coconut fibre or birdseed.

== Uses ==
Although not cultivated, this plant is gathered from the wild and eaten in many parts of the world. The Greeks refer to A. blitum var. silvestre as vlita (Modern Greek: βλίτα) and eat the leaves and the cooked tender shoots, served with olive oil, lemon and salt. In Lebanon (especially to the north) a side dish is made from the young shoots; they are cooked in olive oil, onion, chilli, and burghul, seasoned with salt and lemon, and eaten with pita.

== In culture ==
The plant is thought by many to be the plant mentioned in the Mishnah (Shevi'it 9:1), compiled in 189 CE, under the late Hebrew name yarbūzīn hashōtīn (wild amaranths).
