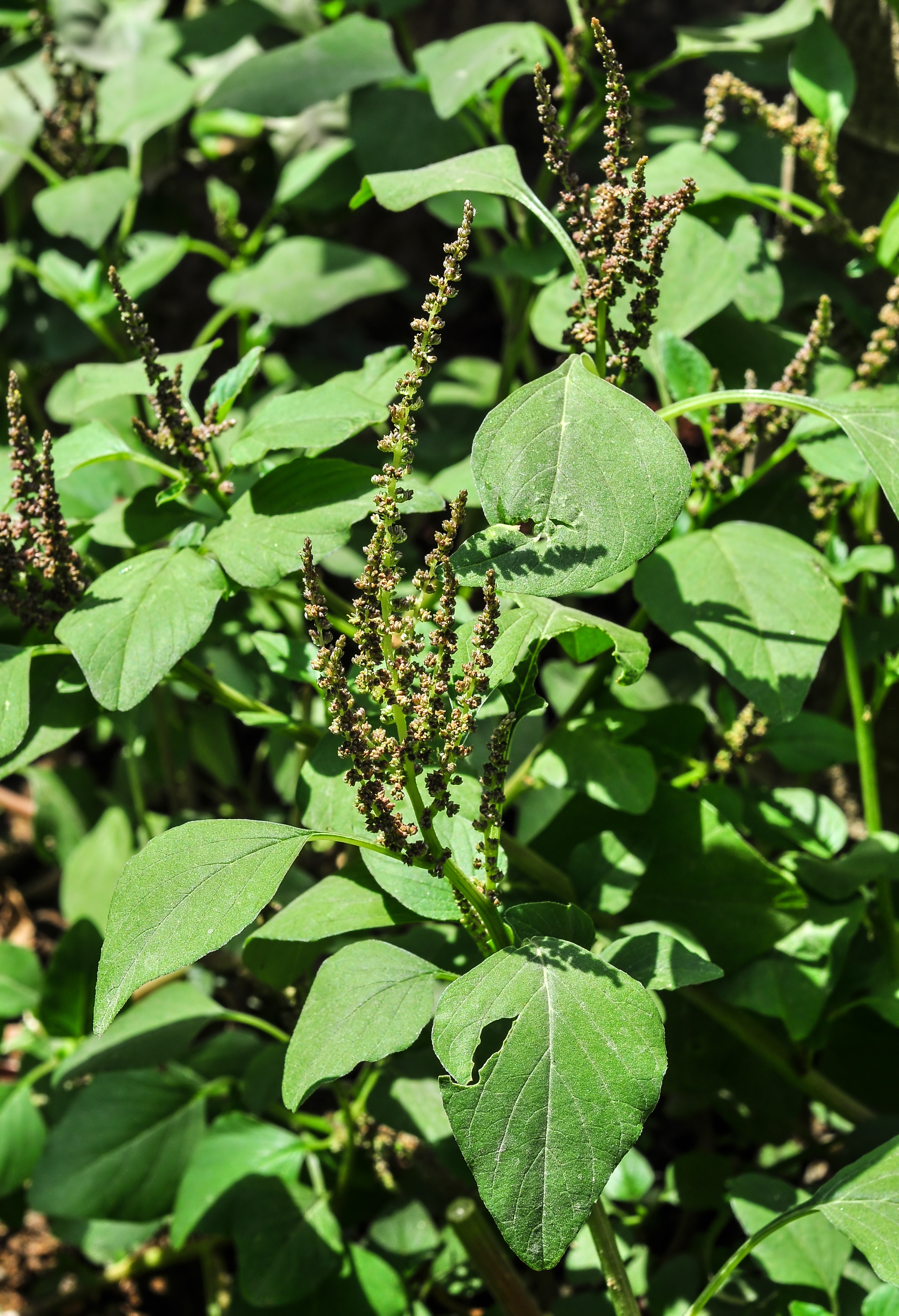

Conservation status
- Least Concern (IUCN 3.1)

Scientific classification
- Kingdom: Plantae
- Clade: Tracheophytes
- Clade: Angiosperms
- Clade: Eudicots
- Order: Caryophyllales
- Family: Amaranthaceae
- Genus: Amaranthus
- Species: A. viridis

Binomial name
- Amaranthus viridis L.

Synonyms
- List: Euxolus viridis (L.) Moq.; Glomeraria viridis (L.) Cav.; Albersia caudata (Jacq.) Boiss.; Albersia gracilis (Desf.) Webb & Berthel.; Albersia polystachya (Willd.) Kunth; Amaranthus fasciatus Roxb.; Amaranthus gracilis Desf. ex Poir.; Amaranthus littoralis Bernh. ex Moq.; Amaranthus polystachyus Willd.; Euxolus caudatus (Jacq.) Moq.; Euxolus polystachyus (Willd.) Miq.; Galliaria adscendens Bubani

= Amaranthus viridis =

Species of flowering plant

Amaranthus viridis is a cosmopolitan species in the botanical family Amaranthaceae and is commonly known as slender amaranth or green amaranth. It is native to the tropics of the Americas, specifically South America, Central America, and the Caribbean.

== Description ==
Amaranthus viridis is an annual herb with an upright, light green stem that grows to about 60–80 cm in height. Numerous branches emerge from the base, and the leaves are ovate, 3–6 cm long, 2–4 cm wide, with long petioles of about 5 cm. The plant has terminal panicles with few branches, and small green flowers with 3 stamens.

== Uses ==
Amaranthus viridis is eaten as a boiled green or as a [vegetable in many parts of the world.

In the Northeastern Indian state of Manipur, it is known as cheng-kruk and in Assam it is known as khutora xak; in Bihar and Jharkhand it is known as Gandhari (or sometimes Gendhari) saag; it is also eaten as a vegetable in South India, especially in Kerala, where it is known as kuppacheera കുപ്പച്ചീര. Sinhala name: Koora thampala (කූර තම්පලා). It is a common vegetable in Bengali cuisine, where it is called notey shak (নোটে শাক, "shak" meaning 'leafy vegetable'). It a very common vegetable used in Odia cuisine as Saaga, namely as Kosila Saaga or Marshi Saag in rural areas.

It is also eaten as a vegetable in parts of Africa. The leaves of this plant, known as massaagu in Dhivehi, have been used in the diet of the Maldives for centuries in dishes such as mas huni. The Yoruba in West Africa name for this plant is ewe tete and is used for medicinal and spiritual purposes.

In the 19th Century A. viridus, or green amaranth was an item of food in Australia. The botanist Joseph Maiden wrote in 1889: "It is an excellent substitute for spinach, being far superior to much of the leaves of the white beet sold for spinach in Sydney. Next to spinach it seems to be most like boiled nettle leaves, which when young are used in England, and are excellent. This amarantus should be cooked like spinach, and as it becomes more widely known, it is sure to be popular, except amongst persons who may consider it beneath their dignity to have anything to do with so common a weed."

Green amaranth also has clusters of nutty edible seeds, which can be eaten as snacks or used in biscuits. A porridge can be made by boiling the seeds in water. Unlike other amaranths, the seeds can be easily harvested by scraping the ripe spikes of seeds between the fingers.

Amaranthus viridis is used as a medicinal herb in traditional Ayurvedic medicine, under the Sanskrit name Tanduliya.

== Nutrition ==
Green amaranth can contain up to 38% protein by dry weight. The leaves and seeds contain lysine, an essential amino acid.

== Related plants ==
The closely related Amaranthus blitum is also eaten. In Jamaica, it is known as callaloo. In Greece, it is known as vlita.

Amaranthus retroflexus is also edible, and sometimes goes by the name "green amaranth".
