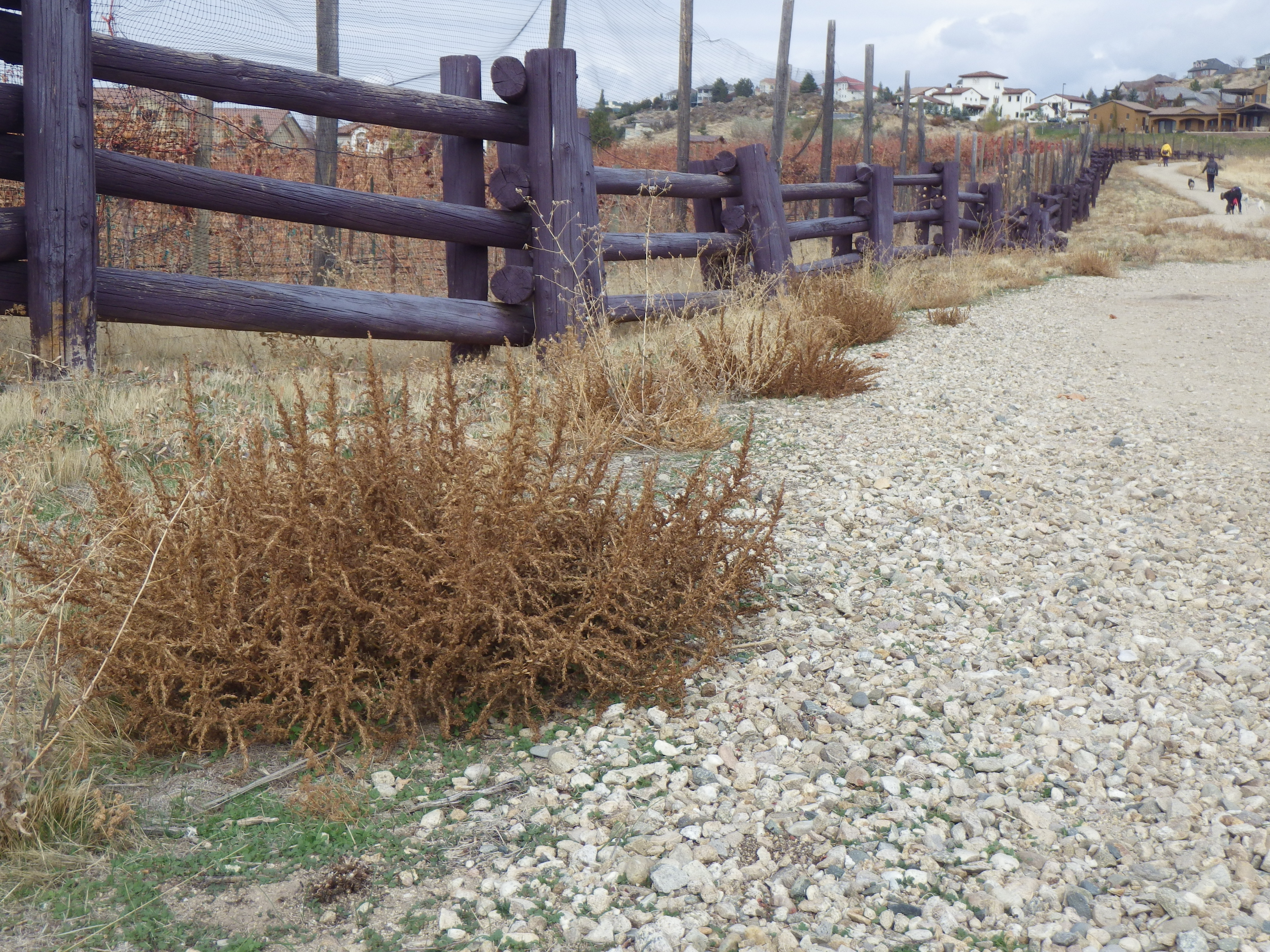

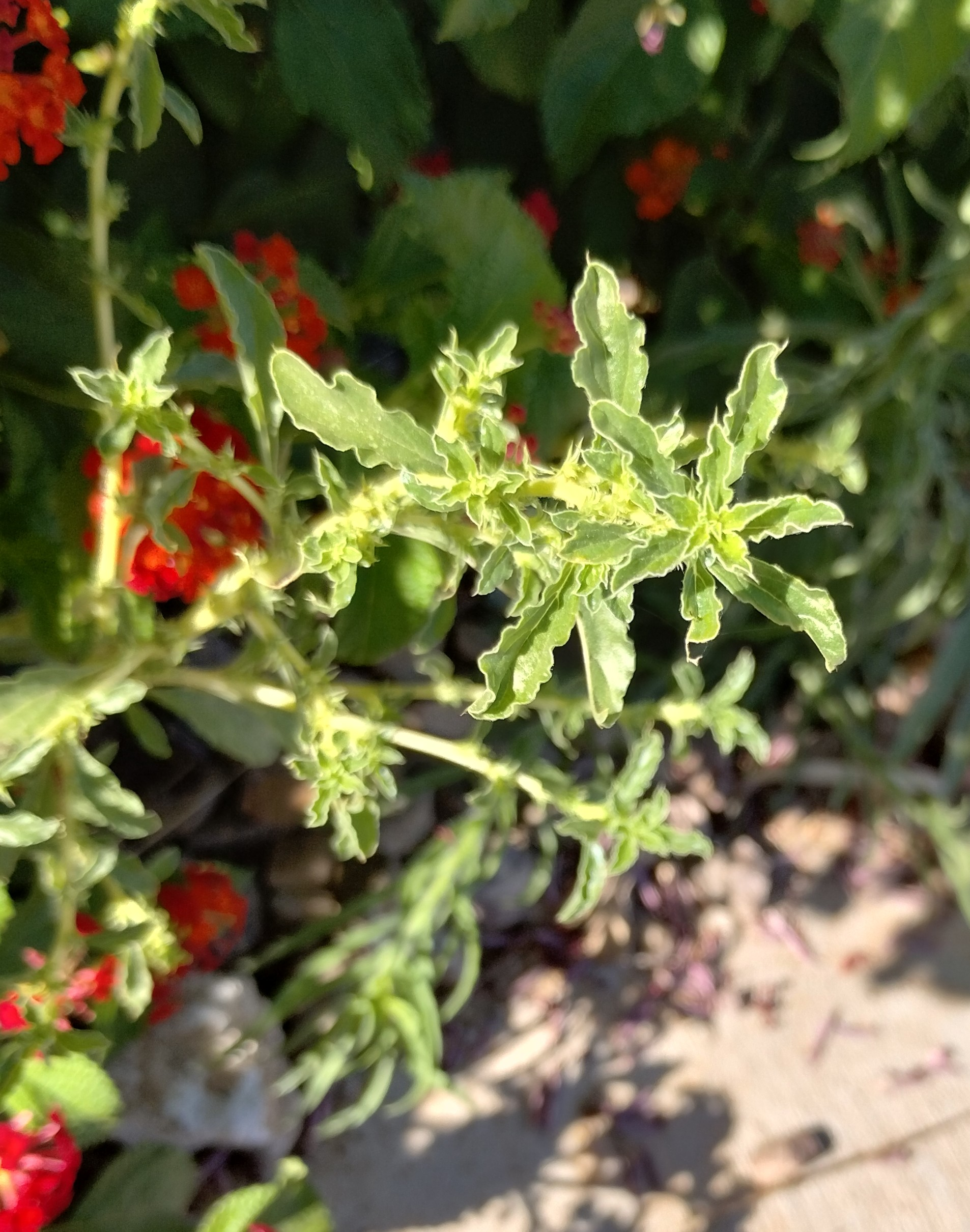

Scientific classification
- Kingdom: Plantae
- Clade: Tracheophytes
- Clade: Angiosperms
- Clade: Eudicots
- Order: Caryophyllales
- Family: Amaranthaceae
- Genus: Amaranthus
- Species: A. albus

Binomial name
- Amaranthus albus L. 1759 not Thunb. 1823 nor Rodschied ex F.Dietr. 1824

Synonyms
- Amaranthus gracilentus H.W.Kung; Amaranthus graecizans Cutanda; Amaranthus littoralis Hornem.; Amaranthus pubescens (Uline & W.L.Bray) Rydb.; Galliaria albida Bubani; Glomeraria alba (L.) Cav.

= Amaranthus albus =

Species of flowering plant

Amaranthus albus is an annual species of flowering plant native to the Americas. Its common names include common tumbleweed, tumble pigweed, tumbleweed, prostrate pigweed, pigweed amaranth, white amaranth and white pigweed.

== Description ==
Amaranthus albus is an annual herb growing up to 50 centimetres (20 in) tall, forming many branches. Larger specimens turn into tumbleweeds when they die and dry out. The plant creates small, greenish flowers in clumps in the axils of the leaves. Male and female flowers are mixed together in the same clump.

== Distribution and habitat ==
It is native to the tropical Americas, but is a widespread introduced species in other places, including Europe, Africa, and Australia.

== Uses ==
In Cambodia, the leaves of the plant (which is known as phti sâ in the Khmer language) are used as pig feed, and are sometimes cooked and eaten by people.
