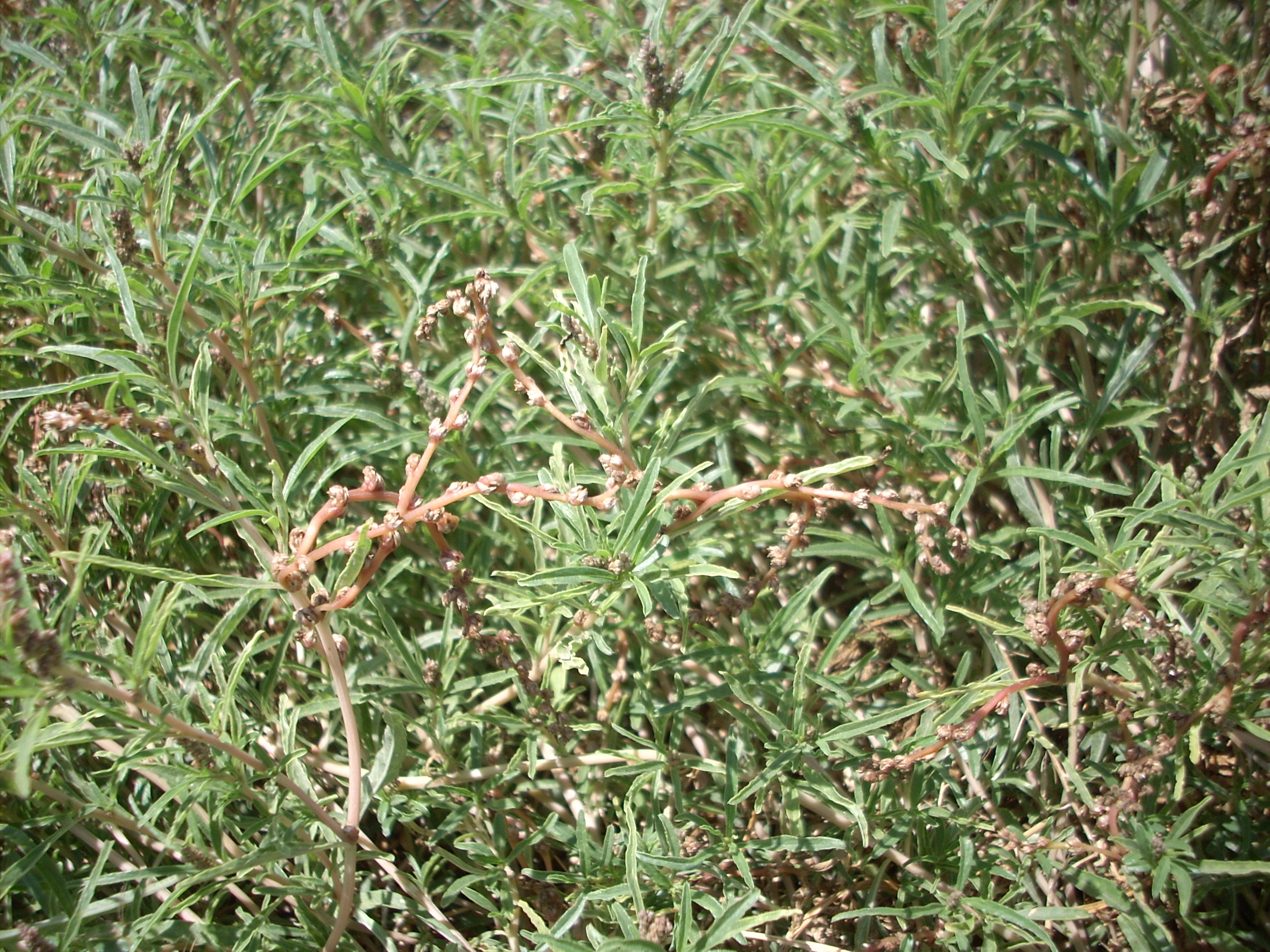

Scientific classification
- Kingdom: Plantae
- Clade: Tracheophytes
- Clade: Angiosperms
- Clade: Eudicots
- Order: Caryophyllales
- Family: Amaranthaceae
- Genus: Amaranthus
- Species: A. muricatus

Binomial name
- Amaranthus muricatus (Gillies ex Moq.) Hieron.

Synonyms
- Amaranthus tarraconensis Sennen & Pau; Euxolus muricatus Gillies ex Moq.

= Amaranthus muricatus =

Species of plant in the genus Amaranthus

Amaranthus muricatus, the so-called African amaranth, is a species in the genus Amaranthus native to South America; Bolivia, Paraguay, Argentina and Uruguay. It is an invasive species in Africa, Europe and Australia, and to a lesser degree in North America and Asia. It is a decumbent perennial that does well in arid climates.

A. muricatus may grow to about 60 cm tall. Its glabrous leaves are linear to lanceolate, about 2-5 cm long, with long petioles. Small flowers are produced on compact, pyramidal panicles. These flowers, which appear in summer and fall, produce wrinkled achenes, about 2 mm long, containing semiglossy, black, lenticular seeds that are typically 1-1.2 mm in diameter.
