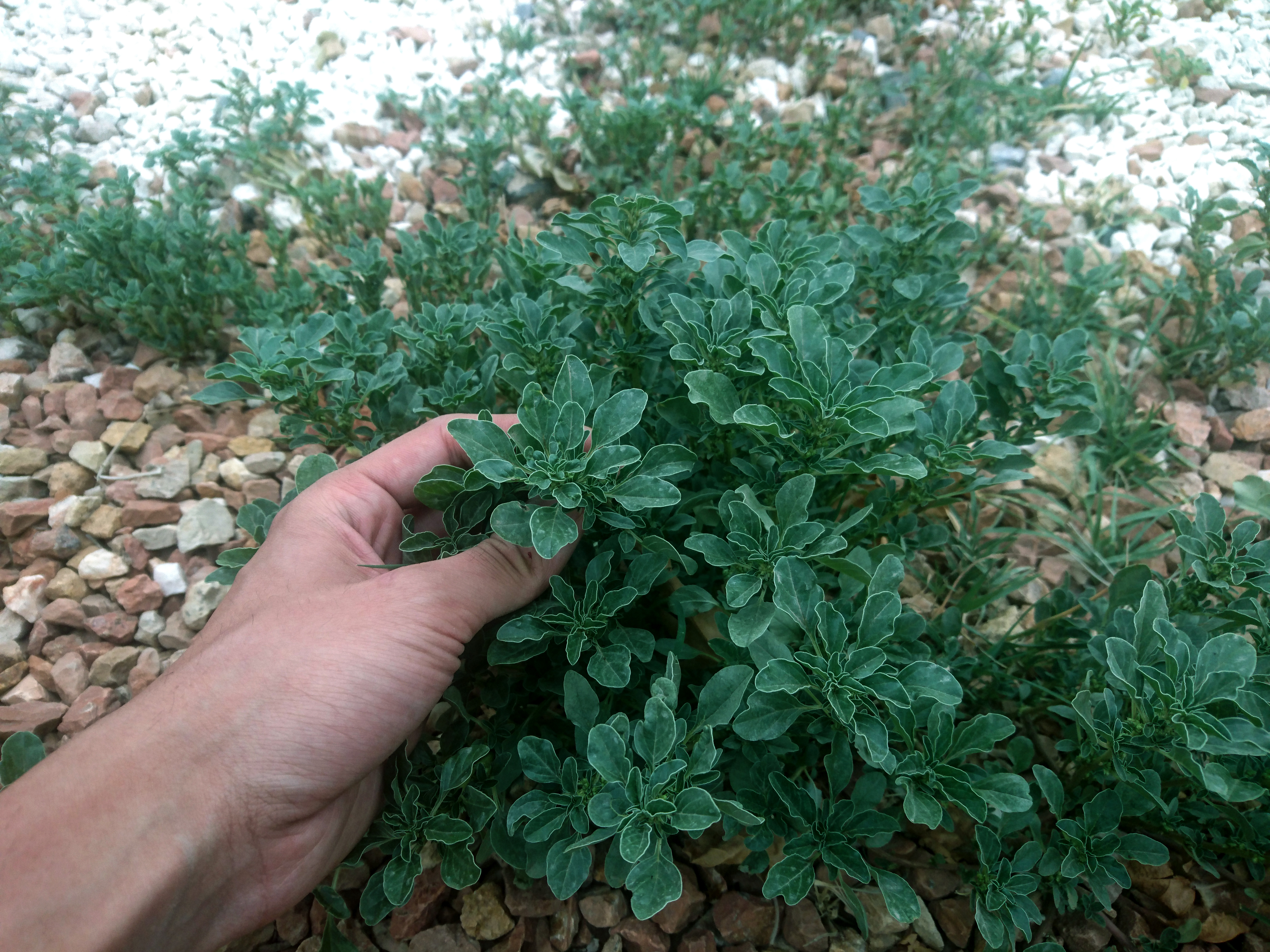

Scientific classification
- Kingdom: Plantae
- Clade: Embryophytes
- Clade: Tracheophytes
- Clade: Angiosperms
- Clade: Eudicots
- Order: Caryophyllales
- Family: Amaranthaceae
- Genus: Amaranthus
- Species: A. blitoides

Binomial name
- Amaranthus blitoides S.Wats.

= Amaranthus blitoides =

Species of flowering plant

Amaranthus blitoides, commonly called mat amaranth, prostrate pigweed, procumbent pigweed, prostrate amaranth, or matweed, is a glabrous annual plants species. It usually grows up to 0.6 m (2 ft 0 in), though it may grow up to 1 m (3 ft 3 in). It flowers in the summer to fall.

It is believed to have been a native of the central and possibly eastern United States, but it has naturalized in almost all of temperate North America. It has also naturalized in South America and Eurasia. Some authorities list it as an invasive species.

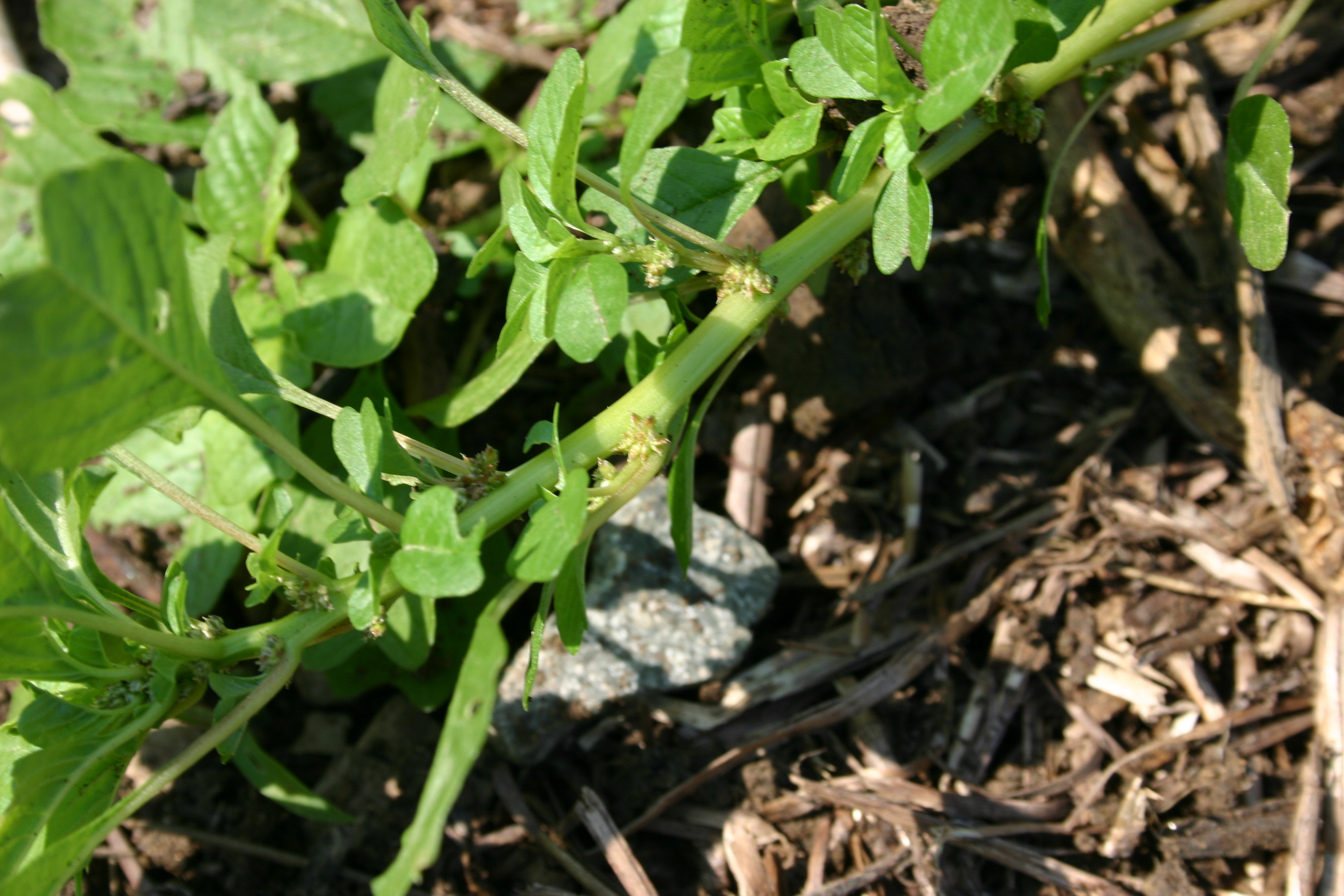

== Uses ==
The seeds of Amaranthus blitoides were used as a food source by a number of Native American groups. Among the Zuni people, the seeds were originally eaten raw, but later ground with black corn meal, made into balls and eaten.
