= Echo (disambiguation) =

An echo is a reflection of sound.

Echo may also refer to:

== Arts, entertainment, and media ==
=== Fictional entities ===
- Echo (DC Comics), various different characters
- Echo (Dollhouse character), the protagonist of the TV series Dollhouse
- Echo (Marvel Comics), a superheroine in the Marvel Comics
  - Maya Lopez (Marvel Cinematic Universe), the Marvel Cinematic Universe counterpart
- Echo, a race of aliens from the TV series Invasion: Earth
- Echo DiSavoy, a character in the soap opera One Life to Live
- Echo Nightray, a character in Pandora Hearts, a manga series
- Echo, an ARC clone trooper from the Star Wars: The Clone Wars TV series and Star Wars: The Bad Batch TV series
- Echo (Overwatch), from 2016 game Overwatch

=== Films ===
- The Echo (1915 film), an American silent short romantic drama directed by Tom Ricketts
- Echo (1997 film), a TV film
- Echo (2001 film), an Iranian drama by Hossein Shahabi
- Echo (2003 film), a short film by Tom Oesch
- Sigaw, a 2004 Filipino horror film, released internationally as The Echo
  - The Echo (2008 film), a horror film based on the Filipino film
- Echo (2007 film), a Danish film
- Echo (2019 film), an Icelandic film
- Echo (2023 film), an Indian film
- The Echo (2023 film), a Mexican film

=== Television shows and episodes ===
- Echo (miniseries), a 2024 Disney+ series based on the Marvel Comics character
- "Echo" (Dollhouse episode), an unaired pilot episode
- "Echo" (The Americans), a 2014 episode
- "Echo", an episode of the TV series Pocoyo

=== Television channels ===
- Echo TV, a conservative Hungarian TV channel
- TV 2 Echo, a Danish television channel

=== Radio ===
- Echo (radio station), a community radio station in Farnborough, Hampshire
- Echo of Moscow, a Russian radio station

=== Literature ===
- Echo (comic book), title by Terry Moore, launched in 2008
- Echo (Block novel), a 2000 fantasy novel by Francesca Lia Block
- Echo (Muñoz Ryan novel), a 2015 novel by Pam Muñoz Ryan
- "Echo", a poem by Christina Rossetti
- The Echo (novel), a 1997 crime novel by Minette Walters
- The Echo, a novel by Giles A. Lutz
- "The Echo" (short story), 1946, by Paul Bowles

=== Newspapers and magazines ===
- Echo (newspaper), a list of newspapers called Echo or The Echo
- The Echo (Cork newspaper), founded in 1892 in Cork, Ireland
- The Echo (Dublin newspaper), based in Dublin, Ireland
- The Echo (Essex), a daily newspaper in England
- The Echo (London) (1868–1905), an evening newspaper in England

=== Online media ===
- Echo (blog comment hosting service)
- EchoNYC, an online community
- Early Cinema History Online, silent films database

=== Music ===
==== Classical compositions ====
- Echo, by Iván Madarász
- Echo, by Lord Henry Somerset, 1900
- The Echo, a 1925 opera by Frank Patterson, featuring soprano Marie Rappold
- Echo (ballet), 1989, by Peter Martins

==== Albums ====
- Echo (Dave Burrell album) or the title track, 1969
- Echo (Ecco2k album), 2026
- Echo (Leona Lewis album), 2009
- Echo (Nothing's Carved in Stone album), 2011
- Echo (Of Mice & Men album) or the title song, 2021
- Echo (Tom Petty and the Heartbreakers album) or the title song, 1999
- Echo Echo, by Carbon Leaf, 2001
- Echo (EP), 2025, by Jin
- Echo (single album), by Ablume, 2025

==== Songs ====
- "Echo" (Elevation Worship song), 2018
- "Echo" (Girls Can't Catch song), 2010
- "Echo" (Gorilla Zoe song), 2009
- "Echo" (Hardwell song) 2015
- "Echo" (Iru song), 2023
- "Echo" (R. Kelly song), 2009
- "Echo" (Trapt song), 2004
- "Echo (You and I)", by Anggun, 2012
- "Echo", by Andrew Bayer from If It Were You, We'd Never Leave, 2013
- "Echo", by Bad Meets Evil from Hell: The Sequel, 2011
- "Echo", by Christina Grimmie from All Is Vanity, 2017
- "Echo", by Ciara from Fantasy Ride, 2009
- "Echo", by Clairo from Charm, 2024
- "Echo", by Cyndi Lauper from Bring Ya to the Brink, 2008
- "Echo", by Daddy Yankee and Shenseea from Official FIFA World Cup 2026 Album, 2026
- "Echo", by Eskimo Joe from Ghosts of the Past, 2011
- "Echo", by Foxes from Glorious, 2014
- "Echo", by Hot Chip from A Bath Full of Ecstasy, 2019
- "Echo", by Joe Satriani from Surfing with the Alien, 1987
- "Echo", by Little Glee Monster, 2019
- "Echo", by Maroon 5 from Jordi, 2021
- "Echo", by the Mekons from The Mekons Rock 'n Roll, 1989
- "Echo", by Starset from Divisions, 2019
- "Echo", by Swizz Beatz from Poison, 2018

==== Other uses in music ====
- Echo (producer) (born 1982), Puerto Rican reggaeton producer
- Echo Music Prize, a German music award 1992–2018
- The Echo Label, a defunct British record label
- Way Out West (duo), also known as Echo, an English electronic music group

=== Video games ===
- Echo: Secrets of the Lost Cavern, 2005
- Echo (2017 video game), a stealth and action-adventure video game

== Brands and enterprises ==
- Amazon Echo, a line of smart speakers by Amazon.com
- Echo Arena Liverpool, a music venue
- ECHO Lake Aquarium and Science Center, in Burlington, Vermont
- Echo smartpen, a ballpoint pen, computer and audio recorder manufactured by Livescribe
- Echo tools, a series of power tools manufactured by the Yamabiko Corporation
- Kyocera Echo, a dual screen smart phone
- The Echo (venue), an American music venue and nightclub, Los Angeles, California
- Toyota Yaris, previously known as the Toyota Echo, a sub-compact car

== Computing ==
- echo (command), a Unix, DOS and Microsoft Windows command to display a line of text
- Echo (computing), a feature of telecommunications protocols
- Echo (framework), a web framework for Java programming
- Echo, a command in programming languages to output one or more strings
- Echo, a discussion forum on FidoNet
- ECHO IV, "Electronic Computer for Home Operation", an experimental home computer from 1966
- Echo Protocol, an Internet protocol largely superseded by ICMP
- Echo (communications protocol), a group communications protocol for authenticated and encrypted information

== People ==
- Aimee Echo, American vocalist with TheStart and Normandie
- Echo Eggebrecht (born 1977), American painter
- Echo Heron, American author and activist
- Echo Johnson, model and actress
- Echo Kellum (born 1982), American actor and comedian

== Places ==
=== United States ===
- Echo, Alabama, an unincorporated community
- Echo, Inyo County, California, a former settlement
- Echo Mountain, in the San Gabriel Mountains, California
- Echo Peak, in the Sierra Nevada range, California
- Echo Peaks
- Echo, Kentucky, an unincorporated community
- Echo, Louisiana, an unincorporated community
- Echo, Minnesota, a city
- Echo, Oregon, a city
- Echo, Pennsylvania, an unincorporated community
- Echo, Utah, a census-designated place
- Echo, Texas
- Echo, West Virginia, an unincorporated community
- Echo Peak (Wyoming), a mountain peak in the Gallatin Range in Yellowstone National Park
- Echo Summit, a mountain pass in California
- Echo Tower, a natural pillar in Utah
- Echo Township, Michigan
- Echo Township, Yellow Medicine County, Minnesota
- Lake Echo (Polk County, Florida)

=== Elsewhere ===
- Echo, Aragón, Spain, a village
- Echo, Ontario, a neighbourhood in West Lincoln, Canada
- 60 Echo, an asteroid
- Echo Bank, a submarine mountain in the Atlantic Ocean
- Echo Bay (disambiguation), several places in the United States and Canada
- Echo Canyon (disambiguation), several places with this name
- Echo Lake (disambiguation), several places in the United States and Canada

== Science ==
- Echo (damselfly), a genus of damselfly
- Echocardiography, an imaging technique used to assess heart function in medicine
- Echovirus, short for "enteric cytopathic human orphan" virus
- EChO, a proposed European Space Agency mission to study exoplanet atmospheres
- ECHO Clearinghouse, NASA's registry of Earth Science data and services, an early SOA example
- Project Echo, the first passive communications satellite experiment
- Signal reflection, in electronics

== Transport ==
=== Aircraft ===
- Echo, the name of an Armstrong Whitworth Ensign aircraft
- Cosmos Echo, an ultralight trike aircraft
- Tecnam P92 Echo, an ultralight aircraft

=== Marine vessels ===
- Echo 12, a Canadian sailboat design
- Echo (1792 ship), a ship launched at Hull in 1792 that made one voyage for the British East India Company and that was captured by a French privateer in 1799
- Echo (steam tug), on Puget Sound
- Echo (sternwheeler 1865), a sternwheel steamboat that operated on the Willamette River, in Oregon, U.S.
- Echo (sternwheeler 1901), a sternwheel steamboat that operated on the Coquille River, in Oregon, U.S.
- Echo-class submarine, a Soviet-era submarine class
- Echo-class survey ship (1957), a Royal Navy class
- Echo-class survey ship (2002), a Royal Navy class
- HMS Echo, various Royal Navy ships
- USS Echo (IX-95), a 1942 US Army World War II supply ship

=== Motor vehicles ===
- Toyota Echo, rebadged variant of the Toyota Yaris, produced between 1999 through 2005

== Other uses ==
- ECHO (European Commission) (European Community Humanitarian aid Office), a department of the European Union
- Echo (mythology), a nymph in Greek mythology
- Echo (elephant), a matriarch elephant in the Amboseli National Park
- Echo, the letter E in the ICAO spelling alphabet
- Educational Concerns for Hunger Organization, a non-profit agro-ecological organization
- Extended Care Health Option, a health coverage program
- East Coast Homophile Organizations
- European Cities of Historical Organs, a network of cities preserving and promoting Europe's rich organ heritage
- Echo, triple parentheses around a name as a symbol of antisemitism
- Echo effect, electronic echo
- Echo (sculpture), by Jaume Plensa

== See also ==
- Echoes (disambiguation)
- Camp Echo (disambiguation)
- Daily Echo (disambiguation)
- Echo II (disambiguation)
- Echo School (disambiguation)
- Eco (disambiguation)
- Ecco (disambiguation)
- Eko (disambiguation)
- Ekko (disambiguation)
- Eckō Unltd., a clothing brand
- EKCO, a British electronics company
