= Grain amaranths =

Edible grain of the Amaranth genus

Amaranth, cooked
Nutritional value per 100 g (3.5 oz)
- Energy: 429 kJ (103 kcal)
- Carbohydrates: 19 g
- Dietary fiber: 2 g
- Fat: 2 g
- Protein: 4 g
Vitamins and minerals
Vitamins	Quantity %DV^{†}
Thiamine (B1)	2% 0.02 mg
Riboflavin (B2)	2% 0.02 mg
Niacin (B3)	2% 0.24 mg
Vitamin B6	6% 0.1 mg
Folate (B9)	6% 22 μg
Minerals	Quantity %DV^{†}
Calcium	4% 47 mg
Iron	12% 2.1 mg
Magnesium	15% 65 mg
Manganese	39% 0.9 mg
Phosphorus	12% 148 mg
Potassium	5% 135 mg
Zinc	8% 0.9 mg
- Other constituents: Quantity
- Water: 75 g
- ^{†}Percentages estimated using US recommendations for adults, except for potassium, which is estimated based on expert recommendation from the National Academies.

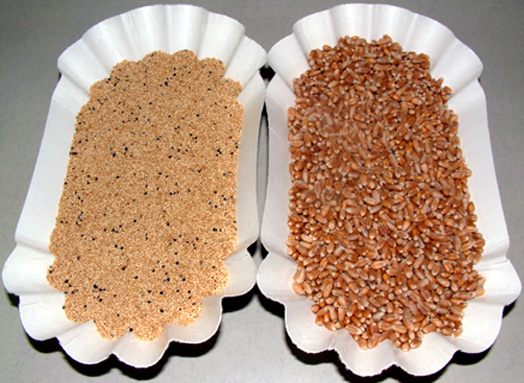
Amaranth grain (left) and wheat (right)

Species belonging to the genus Amaranthus have been cultivated for their grains for 8,000 years.

Amaranth plants are classified as pseudocereals that are grown for their edible starchy seeds, but they are not in the same botanical family as true cereals, such as wheat and rice. Amaranth species that are still used as a grain are Amaranthus caudatus L., Amaranthus cruentus L., and Amaranthus hypochondriacus L. The yield of grain amaranth is comparable to that of rice or maize.

As a dual-purpose crop amaranth seeds and leaves are used for human and animal consumption; grain and leafy amaranths are gluten-free and contain protein, unsaturated fatty acids, vitamins, minerals and low-glycaemic-index carbohydrates.

The grain was a staple food of the Aztecs and an integral part of Aztec religious ceremonies. The cultivation of amaranth was banned by the conquistadores upon their conquest of the Aztec nation. However, the plant has grown as a weed since then, so its genetic base has been largely maintained. Research on grain amaranth began in the United States in the 1970s. By the end of the 1970s, a few thousand acres were being cultivated there, and continue to be cultivated.

Much of the amaranth grain currently grown is sold in health food shops. Grain amaranth is also grown as a food crop in limited areas of Mexico, where it is used to make a candy called alegría (Spanish for joy) at festival times. In other preparations, the grain can be popped like popcorn and then either mixed with honey, or served with milk, dried fruit and nuts like a cold breakfast cereal. Amaranth grain can also be used to extract amaranth oil, a pressed seed oil with commercial uses.

== Nutritional analysis ==
Raw amaranth grain is inedible to humans and cannot be digested because it blocks the absorption of nutrients. Thus it has to be prepared and cooked like other grains. In a 100-gram (3 1/2-ounce) amount, cooked amaranth provides 430 kilojoules (103 kilocalories) of food energy and is a moderately rich source of dietary minerals, including phosphorus, manganese, and iron. Cooked amaranth is 75% water, 19% carbohydrates, 4% protein, and 2% fat (table).

According to Educational Concerns for Hunger Organization (ECHO), amaranth leaves are nutritious, and "amounts of vitamin C, iron, beta carotene, calcium, folic acid and protein are especially high," however, amaranth leaves contain anti-nutritional factors, including oxalates, nitrates, saponins, and phenolic compounds. Cooking methods such as boiling the leaves in water and then discarding the water may reduce toxic effects. The report also cites a study indicating that "research has shown that consumption of 200 grams of cooked amaranth poses no health problems."

Amaranth grain is high in protein and lysine, an amino acid found in low quantities in other grains. According to the FAO, amaranth grain as a source of protein is "superior in content and quality to traditional cereals". Amaranth grain is deficient in essential amino acids such as leucine and threonine – both of which are present in wheat germ. Amaranth grain is free of gluten, which makes it a viable grain for people with gluten intolerance.

Synopsis ~ composition:	Amaranth	Wheat	Rice	Sweetcorn	Potato
Component (per 100g portion)	Amount	Amount	Amount	Amount	Amount
water (g)	11	13	12	76	82
energy (kJ)	1554	1368	1527	360	288
energy (kcal)	371	327	365	86	69
protein (g)	14	13	7	3	1.7
fat (g)	7	2	1	1	0.1
carbohydrates (g)	65	71	79	19	16
fiber (g)	7	12	1	3	2.4
sugars (g)	1.7	<0.1	>0.1	3	1.2
iron (mg)	7.6	3	0.8	0.5	0.5
manganese (mg)	3.4	4	1.1	0.2	0.1
calcium (mg)	159	29	28	2	9
magnesium (mg)	248	126	25	37	21
phosphorus (mg)	557	288	115	89	62
potassium (mg)	508	363	115	270	407
zinc (mg)	2.9	2.6	1.1	0.5	0.3
pantothenic acid (mg)	1.5	0.9	1.0	0.7	0.3
vitB6 (mg)	0.6	0.3	0.2	0.1	0.2
folate (μg)	82	38	8	42	18
thiamin (mg)	0.1	0.3	0.1	0.2	0.1
riboflavin (mg)	0.2	0.1	>0.1	0.1	>0.1
niacin (mg)	0.9	5.4	1.6	1.8	1.1

The table below presents nutritional values of cooked, edible form of amaranth grain to cooked, edible form of wheat grain.

Synopsis ~ composition:	Amaranth grain, cooked	Cereals, whole wheat, cooked
Component (per 100g portion)	Amount	Amount
water (g)	75	83
energy (kJ)	429	259
energy (kcal)	103	62
protein (g)	4	2
fat (g)	2	0.4
carbohydrates (g)	19	14
fiber (g)	2	2
sugars (g)	n/a	n/a
iron (mg)	2.1	0.6
manganese (mg)	0.85	0.85
calcium (mg)	47	7
magnesium (mg)	65	22
phosphorus (mg)	148	69
potassium (mg)	135	71
zinc (mg)	0.9	0.5
pantothenic acid (mg)	<0.1	n/a
vitB6 (mg)	0.11	0.07
folate (μg)	22	14
thiamin (mg)	<0.1	0.07
riboflavin (mg)	0.02	0.05
niacin (mg)	0.24	0.8

== Cultivation ==
There are about 74 species in the genus Amaranthus, of which three are cultivated for their grain.

== Cultural uses ==
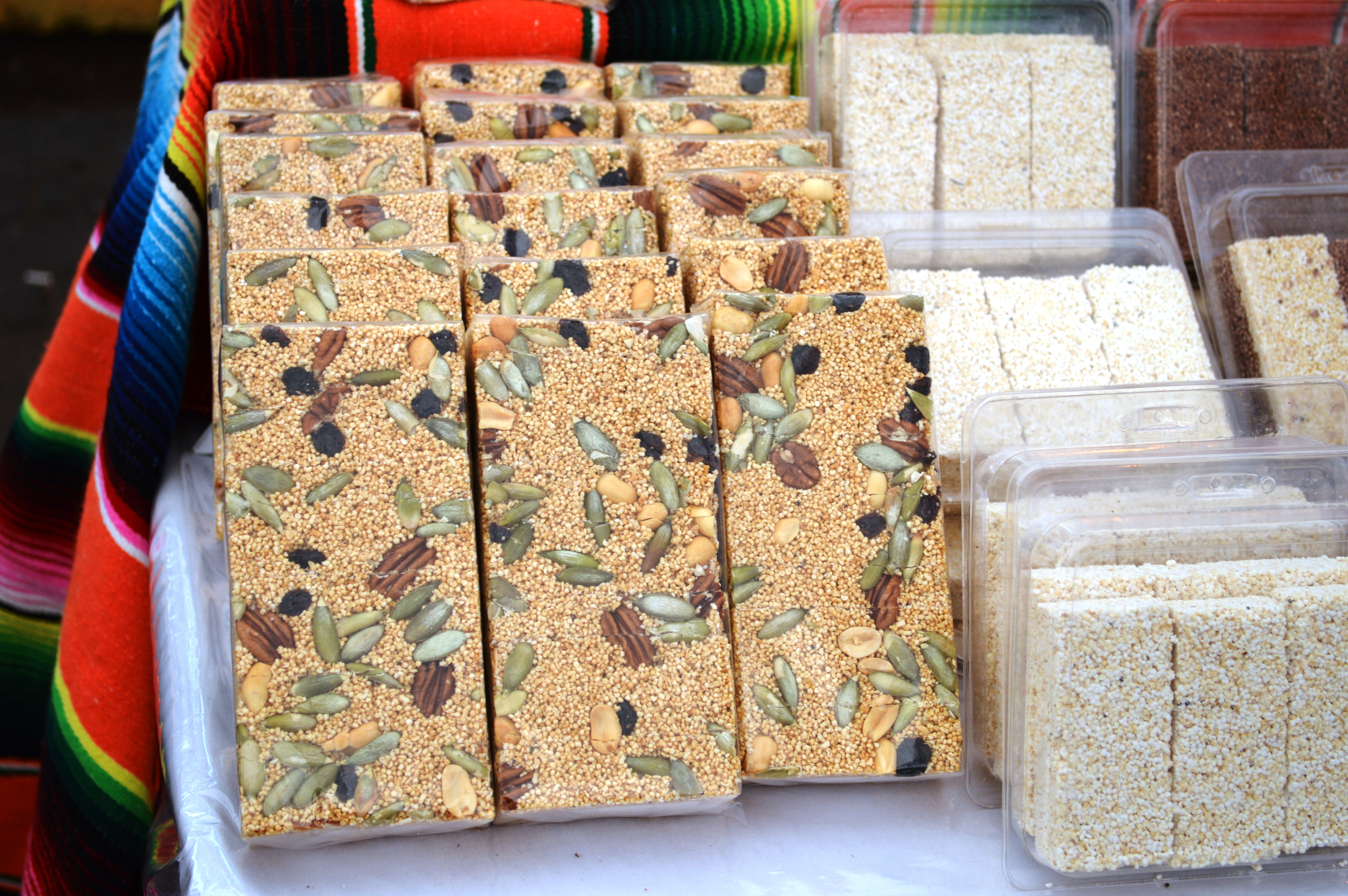
Alegría, a Mexican snackfood made with amaranth grain

The Aztecs cultivated amaranth as a staple grain crop in what is now Mexico during the pre-Columbian period. Amaranth was used by the Aztecs for tamales, tortillas, and atole (hot cereal). In addition they formed shaped images of their gods with amaranth, agave, and maize during the sacred month of Huitzilopochtli. At the end of the month, the statues were eaten by the families to "take the god into them". When the Spanish prohibited religious acts like this, and imposed the religion of their God who was worshiped through wheat, amaranth cultivation decreased. In current Mexican culture on the Day of the Dead, amaranth seeds are offered as snack foods for the spirits. Edible skulls were historically made with amaranth seeds, although today they are made out of sugar.

== Gallery ==
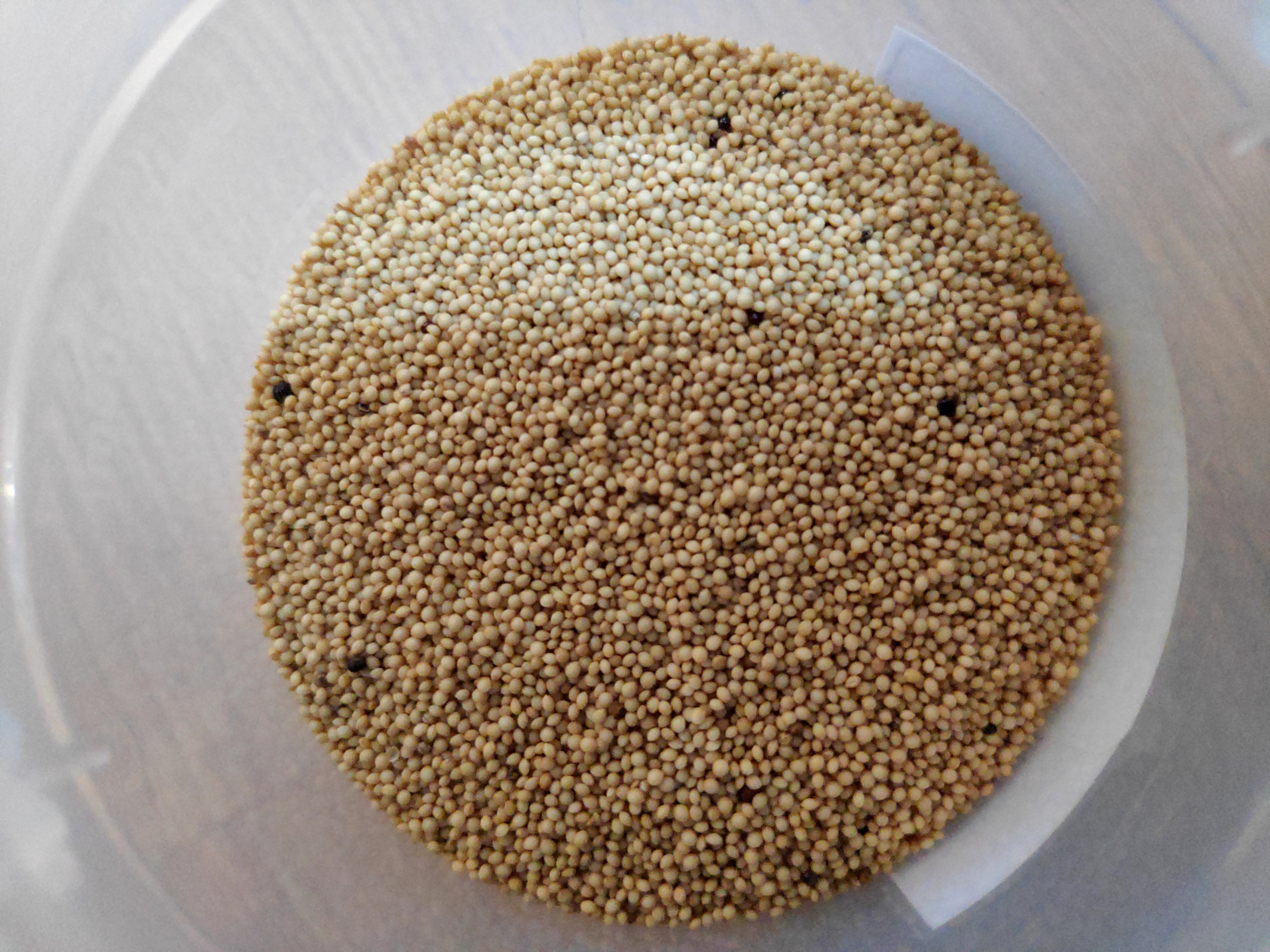
Amaranth grain from Nepal

Amaranth grain under low-power microscope

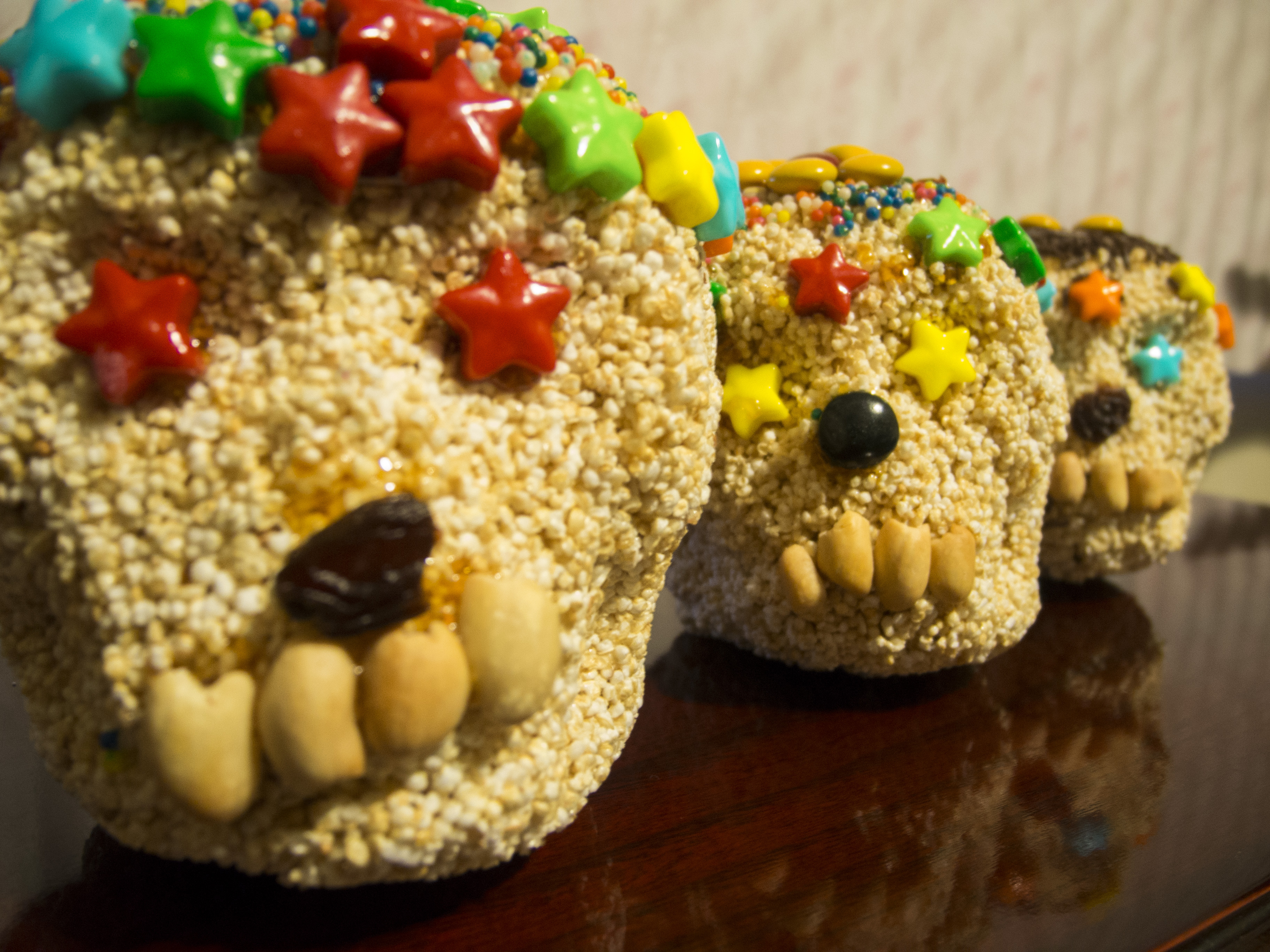
Skull shapes made of amaranth and honey for Day of the Dead in Mexico

Popped amaranth
