= Pseudocereal =

Non-grass plants treated like cereals

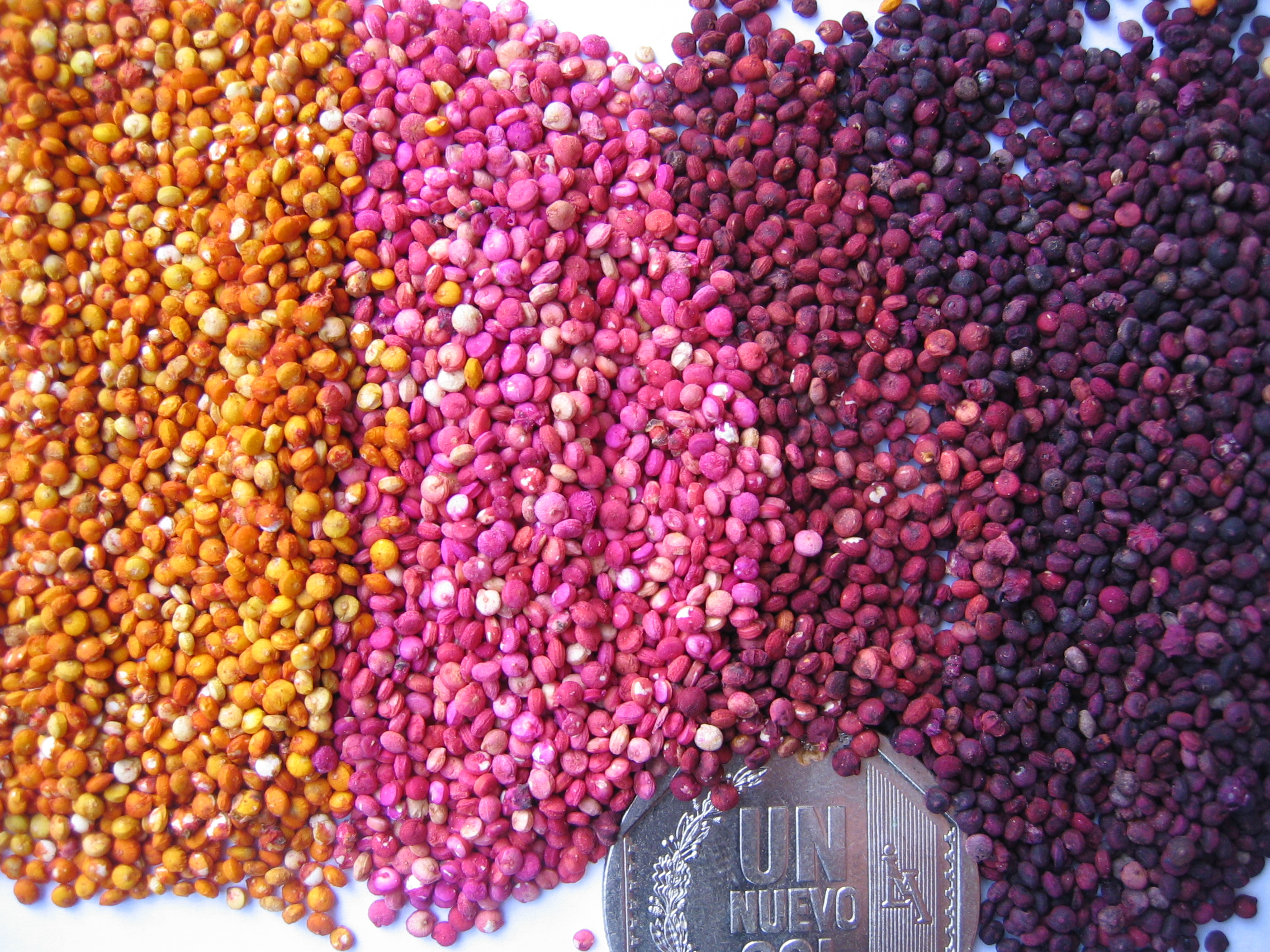
Quinoa, a common pseudocereal

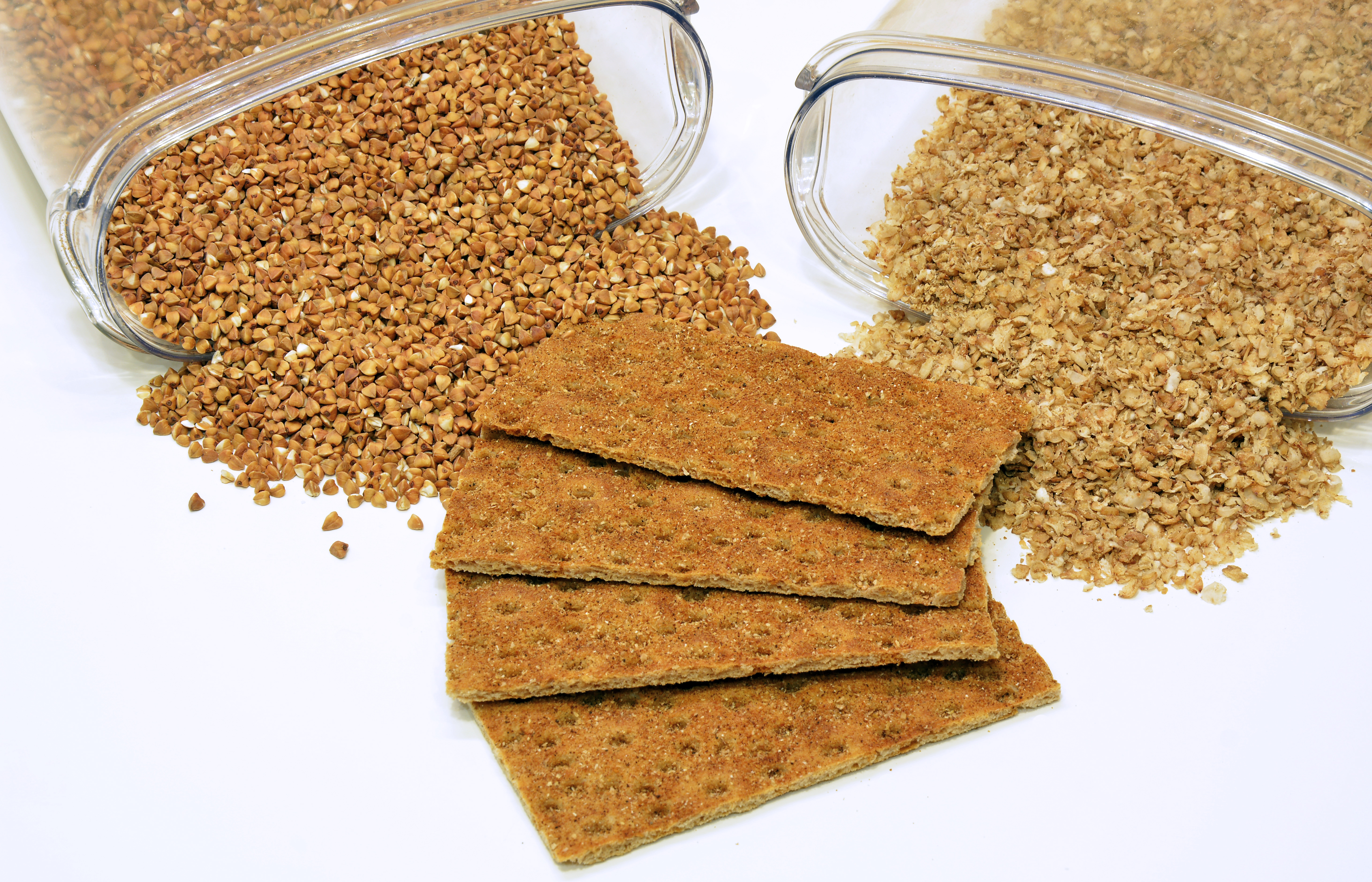
Buckwheat is the most widely consumed pseudocereal. This image shows (left to right) buckwheat seeds, crispbread and buckwheat flakes.

A pseudocereal or pseudograin is one of any non-grasses that are used in much the same way as cereals (true cereals are grasses). Pseudocereal can be further distinguished from other non-cereal staple crops (such as potatoes) by their being processed like a cereal: their seed can be ground into flour and otherwise used as a cereal. Prominent examples include amaranth (love-lies-bleeding, red amaranth, Prince-of-Wales-feather), quinoa, and buckwheat. The pseudocereals have a good nutritional profile, with high levels of essential amino acids, essential fatty acids, minerals, and some vitamins. The starch in pseudocereals has small granules and low amylose content (except for buckwheat), which gives it similar properties to waxy-type cereal starches. The functional properties of pseudocereals, such as high viscosity, water-binding capacity, swelling capability, and freeze-thaw stability, are determined by their starch properties and seed morphology. Pseudocereals are gluten-free, and they are used to make 100% gluten-free products, which has increased their popularity.

== Taxonomic range ==
=== Amaranthaceae ===
- Amaranth (love-lies-bleeding, red amaranth, Prince-of-Wales-feather)
- Cañahua
- Cockscomb, also called quail grass or soko
- Djulis
- Goosefoot
- Pitseed goosefoot
- Hanza
- Orache
- Quinoa

=== Fabaceae ===
- Wattleseed, also called acacia seed. There are many species, including sandplain wattle and elegant wattle.

=== Fagales ===
- Acorn

=== Lamiaceae ===
- Chia
- Pignut

=== Moraceae ===
- Breadnut

=== Polygonaceae ===
- Buckwheat
- Bitter (Tatar) buckwheat
- Tall buckwheat

== Production ==
This table shows the annual production of some pseudocereals in 1961 (the earliest year for which FAO statistics are available), 2010, 2011, 2012, and 2013; they are ranked by 2013 production.

Grain	Worldwide production (millions of metric tons)					Notes
Grain	1961	2010	2011	2012	2013	Notes
Buckwheat	2.5	1.4	2.3	2.3	2.5	A pseudocereal in the family Polygonaceae that is used extensively in India during fasts, and in Eurasia and to a minor degree the United States and Brazil. Major uses include various pancakes, groats, and noodle production.
Quinoa	0.03	0.08	0.08	0.08	0.10	A pseudocereal in the family Amaranthaceae, traditional to the Andes, but increasingly popular elsewhere.

Other grains that are locally important, but are not included in FAO statistics, include:

- Amaranth, an ancient pseudocereal, formerly a staple crop of the Aztec Empire, widely grown in Africa.
- Kañiwa or Cañahua, close relative of quinoa.
