= Amaranth oil =

Oil from the seeds of two species of the genus Amaranthus

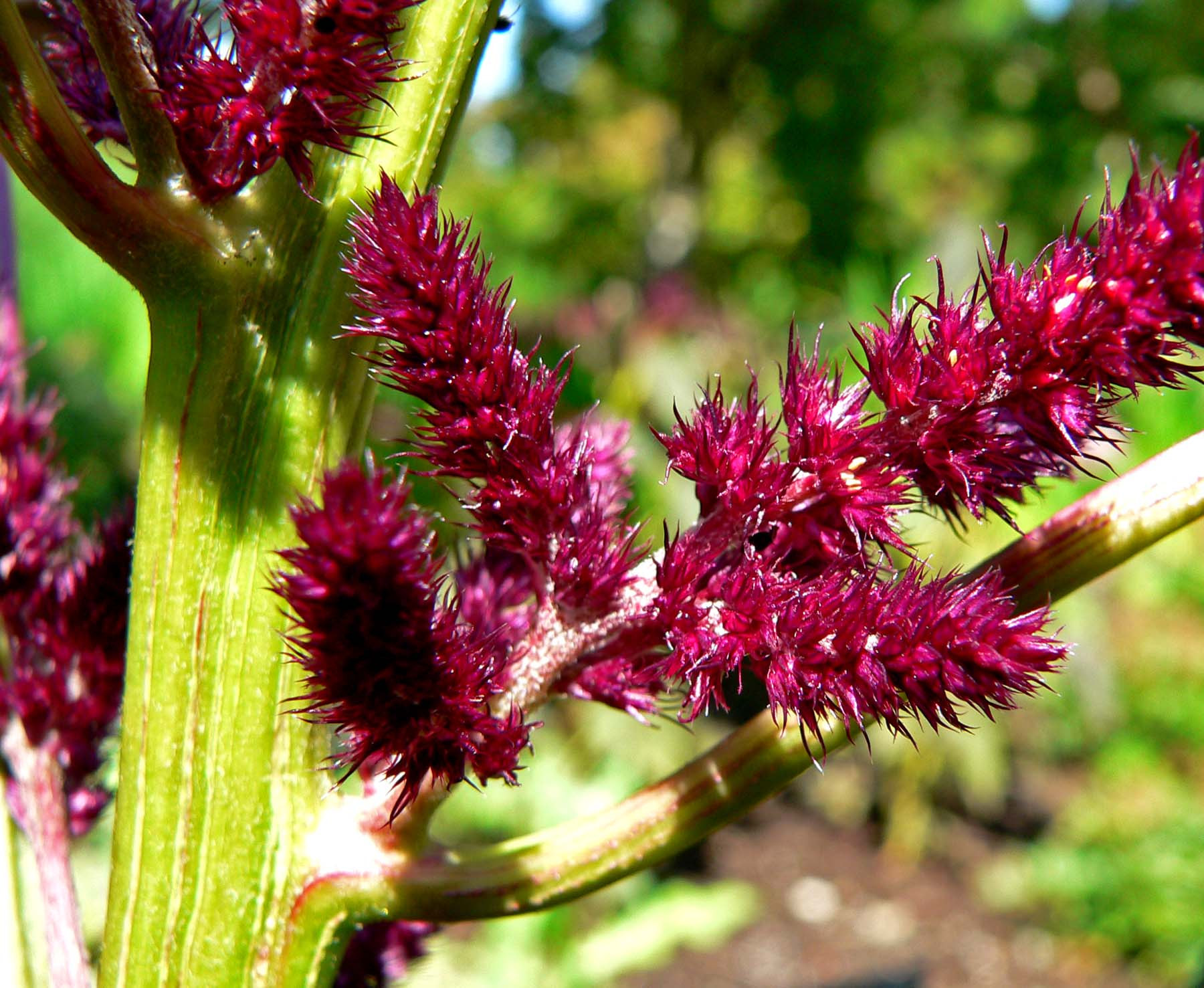
Amaranthus cruentus

Amaranth oil is extracted from the seeds of two species of the genus Amaranthus — A. cruentus and A. hypochondriacus — that are called, collectively, amaranth grain.

Amaranth oil is a light-to-medium-colored, clear liquid that is pourable at low temperatures. It is a source of fatty acids, with oleic acid, linoleic acid, and palmitic acid having the highest proportions. The oil is valued for its ability to add temperature stability at both high and low temperatures. Commercial uses of amaranth oil include foods, cosmetics, shampoos, and intermediates for manufacture of lubricants, pharmaceuticals, rubber chemicals, aromatics, and surface active agents. As a food oil, amaranth oil has a delicate taste. The oil content of the actual amaranth grain ranges from 4.8 to 8.1%, which is relatively low compared to other sources of seed oil. The melting point of amaranth oil is −27 °C (−17 °F).

Chemically, the major constituents of amaranth oil are:

Fatty acid	Content
Linoleic acid	50%
Oleic acid	23%
Palmitic acid	19%
Stearic acid	3%
