= Eggebrecht =

Eggebrecht may refer to:

- Julian Eggebrecht, video game developer
- Renate Eggebrecht (b. 1944), German violinist and record producer
- Axel Eggebrecht (1899–1991), German journalist and writer
- Hans Heinrich Eggebrecht (1919−1999), German musicologist
- Echo Eggebrecht (b. 1977), New York painter
