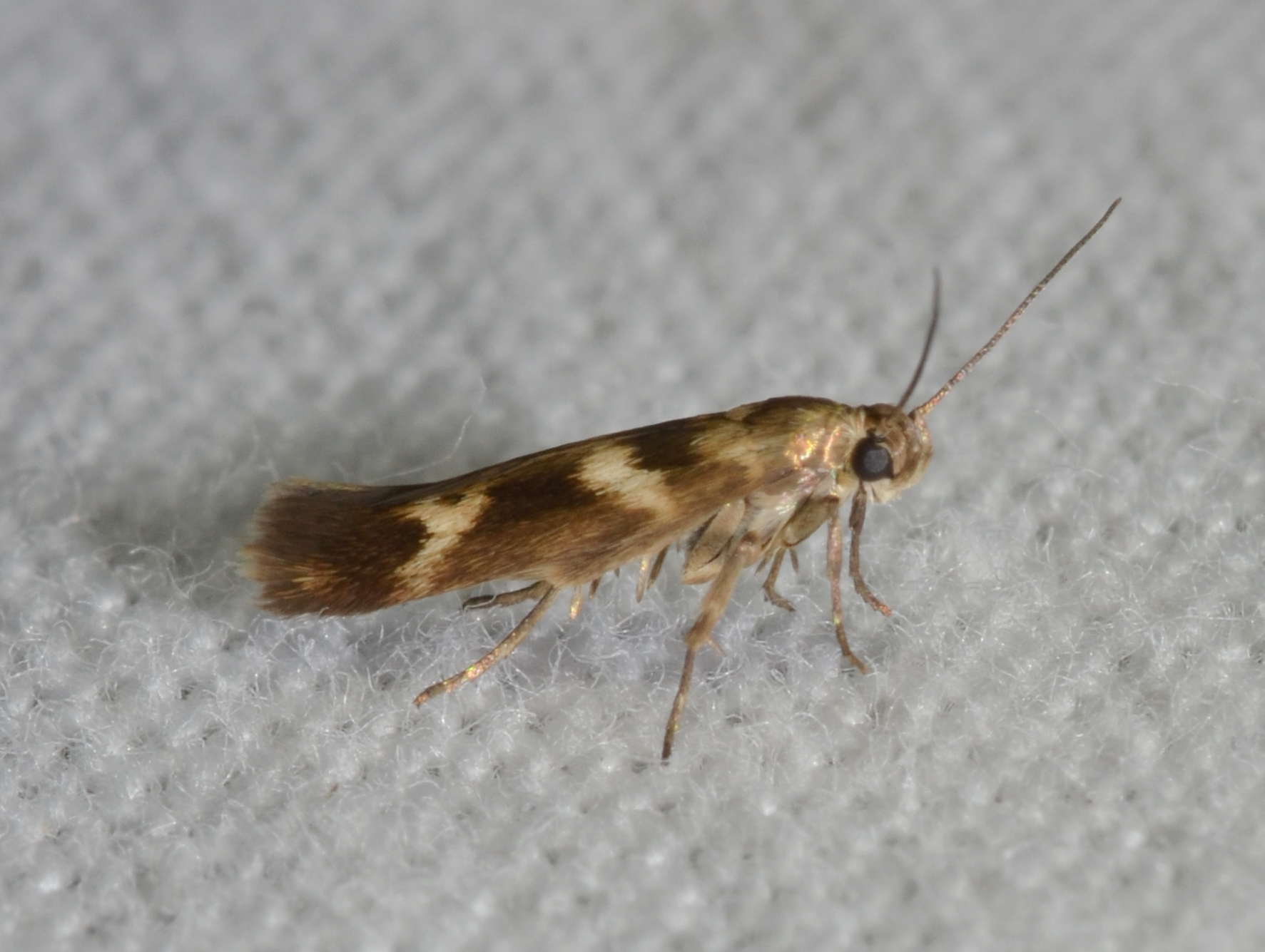

Scientific classification
- Kingdom: Animalia
- Phylum: Arthropoda
- Clade: Pancrustacea
- Class: Insecta
- Order: Lepidoptera
- Family: Scythrididae
- Genus: Scythris
- Species: S. trivinctella

Binomial name
- Scythris trivinctella (Zeller, 1873)

Synonyms
- Butalis trivinctella Zeller, 1873

= Scythris trivinctella =

Banded scythris moth

Species of moth

Scythris trivinctella, the banded scythris moth, is a moth of the family Scythrididae. It is found in North America, where it has been recorded from New England to Florida, the Great Plains states, Texas to Arizona and south into Mexico, Utah, eastern Oregon and north into southern British Columbia.

The wingspan is 11–12 mm.

The larvae feed on Amaranthus hybridus.
