= Echo School =

Echo School may refer to:

- Echo School (Oregon), a public primary and secondary school in Echo, Oregon
- Echo School (Echo, Utah), a historic two-room schoolhouse that was built in 1914 in Echo, Utah
- Echo Church and School, a church and school building in Echo, Utah, that includes work from 1876 in Late Gothic Revival architecture
