= Mária Temesi =

Hungarian operatic soprano and university professor

- Born: July 29, 1957 (age 69); Szeged, Hungary
- Education: Franz Liszt Academy of Music
- Known for: Operatic soprano, artist
- Children: 1
- Awards: Order of Merit of the Republic of Hungary, Knight's Cross, 2016

Mária Temesi (Hungarian: [ˈˈma:riɒ tɛmɛʃi]; born 29 July 1957) is a Hungarian operatic soprano, university (full) professor, and the head of the voice department at the faculty of music at the University of Szeged.

== Biography and career ==
Temesi was born on 29 July 1957 in Szeged, Hungary. Her birth name was Mária Tóth.

Before her graduation she won the 4th prize at the International Maria Callas Grand Prix in Athens in 1979.

She took BA degree in music and piano teaching at the Franz Liszt College of Music at the Conservatory of Szeged in 1979 and M.A. degree in opera studies and in education in 1981 at the Franz Liszt Academy of Music, Budapest.

After her graduation she became the member of the Hungarian State Opera House in 1981.

Temesi won the 1st prize at the Luciano Pavarotti International Voice Competition in Philadelphia in 1985.

Temesi was appointed to the head of the department of the voice department as associate professor (docent, reader), and has been acting as the chairman from 1997.

She was awarded Doctor of Liberal Arts (D.L.A.) degree in 2003 and then he received the title of university (full) professor.

She has been one of the founders of the József Simándy International Singing Competition from 1998.

== Repertoire ==
- Sándor Szokolay: Ecce Homo....Lénió
- Wagner: Tannhäuser....Princess Elizabeth
- Wagner: Die Walküre....Sieglinde
- Verdi: Il trovatore....Leonora
- Verdi: Aida....Aida
- Wagner: Siegfried....Brünnhilde
- Wagner: The Flying Dutchman....Senta
- Wagner: Götterdämmerung....Brünnhilde
- Richard Strauss: Elektra....Chrysothemis
- Mascagni: Cavalleria rusticana....Santuzza
- Iván Madarász: Last waltz...Woman
- Puccini: Tosca....Floria Tosca
- Janáček: Jenůfa....Kostelnička Buryjovka
- Wagner: Lohengrin....Ortrud
- Giordano: Andrea Chénier....La comtesse di Coigny
- Strauss: Der Rosenkavalier....Marianne
- Mozart: Don Giovanni...Donna Anna
- Verdi: Don Carlos....Élisabeth de Valois
- Tchaikovsky: Eugene Onegin....Tatyana Larina
- Wagner: Die Meistersinger von Nürnberg....Eva
- Cilea: Adriana Lecouvreur....Adriana Lecouvreur

== Discography ==
- 2004: Wagner Hősnők (Heroines) Hungaroton - Budapest
- 1999: Mozart: Requiem Bilkent University - Ankara
- 1996: Britten: Háborús rekviem (War Requiem) University of Zagreb
- 1990: Liszt: Hungaria 1848 Hungaroton - Budapest
- 1986: Liszt: Missa Choralis Hungaroton - Budapest
- 1984: Respighi: La fiamma (La Madre) Hungaroton - Budapest
- 1983: Mahler: Symphony No. 8 (Mater Gloriosa) Hungaroton - Budapest

== Awards and honours ==
- The International Maria Callas Grand Prix, Athens - 4th prize (1979)
- International Singing Competition of Toulouse, Théâtre du Capitole - 3rd prize (1980)
- The Luciano Pavarotti International Voice Competition in Philadelphia - 1st prize (1985)
- Bartók–Pásztory prize (1992)
- Mihály Székely memorial plaquette (1995)
- Juventus Music Award (1996)
- Franz Liszt Prize (2000)
- Artisjus Award (2003)
- Order of Merit of the Republic of Hungary, Knight's Cross, 2016
