= Echo, California =

Echo, California may refer to:

- Echo, Inyo County, California
- Echo, California, former name of Echo Lake, California
