= Floating gardening =

Agricultural practice in Bangladesh

The floating gardening, locally known as baira or dhap, is a traditional agricultural practice originating from Bangladesh. The practice involves layering water hyacinth, bamboo and organic matter to create floating beds for vegetable cultivation. This adaptive farming method emerged as a solution to the severe monsoon flooding that submerges arable land for months each year. Highlighting its significance in sustainable agriculture and climate resilience, it was recognized by the Food and Agriculture Organization (FAO) as a Globally Important Agricultural Heritage System (GIAHS) in 2015.

== History ==
Floating agriculture has been practiced in the wetlands of southern Bangladesh for over 400 years, primarily in the districts such as Gopalganj, Pirojpur, and Barisal. This method emerged as a response to the challenges posed by seasonal flooding, enabling communities to sustain agricultural activities despite inundated lands. Over time, the practice has evolved, integrating traditional knowledge with innovative techniques to enhance productivity and resilience.

In 2005, the Food and Agriculture Organization (FAO) of the United Nations identified floating gardening as a “good practice” in agricultural adaptation to climate change.

== Construction and technique ==
Floating gardens are typically constructed during the monsoon season, when floodwaters rise and submerge traditional croplands. Farmers begin by weaving rafts from water hyacinth, an invasive aquatic plant found abundantly in Bangladeshi wetlands. These rafts are usually 1 meter wide, 10 to 15 meters long, and about 0.5 meters thick. On top of the hyacinth base, farmers layer decomposed organic materials such as cow dung, compost, and aquatic plants to form a nutrient-rich bed. This floating mass is then anchored with bamboo poles to prevent it from drifting.

The beds are maintained for several months and replenished between planting cycles. They are highly mobile and biodegradable, leaving no waste when they decompose at the end of the season.

== Crops grown ==
A variety of crops are cultivated on these floating beds, including leafy vegetables like spinach and amaranth, as well as gourds, cucumbers, and eggplants. In regions like Gopalganj, floating cabbage farming has gained popularity due to its adaptability and profitability. The choice of crops often depends on local demand and environmental conditions.

Common crops include:

- Red amaranth
- Indian spinach (Pui shak)
- Bottle gourd
- Bitter gourd
- Okra
- Eggplant
- Chili peppers
- Ginger
- Turmeric

Some farmers also cultivate rice seedlings on floating beds for later transplantation.

== Socioeconomic impact ==
Floating gardens have significantly improved the livelihoods of landless and marginalized farmers. In Jashore, for instance, many unemployed fishermen have become self-reliant by adopting this method, cultivating vegetables on floating beds in local rivers. This practice has not only provided food security but also created alternative income sources, especially during the monsoon season when traditional farming is not feasible.

According to the United Nations Development Programme (UNDP), the system increases food security, reduces malnutrition, and creates income-generating opportunities—especially for women and landless farmers.

In many households, women manage floating gardens and sell produce in local markets, promoting economic independence.

== Environmental significance ==
The floating garden system in Bangladesh contributes to environmental sustainability by repurposing water hyacinth (Eichhornia crassipes), an invasive aquatic plant species that grows abundantly in the country's wetlands. These gardens use decomposed aquatic vegetation as organic compost, enriching the planting beds and improving the surrounding aquatic ecosystem. The technique eliminates the need for synthetic fertilizers and pesticides, promoting a natural and self-sustaining farming method. Additionally, it helps control water hyacinth growth by incorporating it into the structure of the floating rafts, thus reducing its ecological threat. The floating beds also reduce soil erosion and serve as microhabitats, supporting aquatic biodiversity in regions frequently affected by flooding.

== Global recognition and replication ==
The floating garden technique has gained international recognition. FAO, UNDP, and Practical Action have implemented pilot projects in countries such as Vietnam, Myanmar, and Cambodia. Development charities such as CAFOD in the UK have financed training in floating bed techniques in Bangladesh and also in South Sudan.

In 2015, the Government of Bangladesh and UNDP launched training programs to scale the technique through the Community-Based Adaptation to Climate Change project.

== Challenges ==
Despite its benefits, floating agriculture faces challenges such as labor intensity, limited access to markets, and vulnerability to extreme weather events. In Pirojpur, farmers have reported devastation due to low vegetable prices, impacting their income and the sustainability of the practice. Moreover, the younger generation shows less interest in this labor-intensive method, posing a threat to its continuity.

== Future prospects ==
Innovations such as integrating solar irrigation and using mobile technology for agricultural advice are being explored to enhance the efficiency and resilience of floating gardens. These advancements aim to attract younger generations and expand the practice to other flood-prone regions. International organizations and local NGOs are working collaboratively to scale up this practice, recognizing its potential in ensuring food security amid climate change.
