= Echo Canyon =

Echo Canyon may refer to:

== Places in the American West ==
- Echo Canyon State Park, a state park in Nevada
- Echo Canyon Reservoir State Wildlife Area, a fishing and birding area in Colorado
- Camelback Mountain, Echo Canyon Recreation Area, a park in Phoenix, Arizona
- A canyon in Chiricahua National Monument, Arizona
- A canyon in Death Valley, California
- A canyon in Summit County, Utah
- A canyon in Zion National Park, Utah
- Echo Park (Colorado), an area in Dinosaur National Monument
  - Echo Park Dam, a proposed dam in Echo Park that was never built

== Music related ==
- The New York City studio of the band Sonic Youth, and "Bad Moon Rising" by that band
  - Echo Canyon West, the Hoboken, New Jersey, studio of the same band that replaced the aforementioned studio
- An album by jazz flautist James Newton
- A song by folk musician Rosalie Sorrels

== Various ==
- A one-minute short of the television cartoon The Simpsons
