= Echo II =

Echo II or Echo 2 or variant, may refer to:

- Echo II-class submarine of the Soviet Navy
- Echo 2 (satellite), a 1964 NASA communications satellite
- Echo II (expansion card), a speech synthesizer card for the Apple II

== See also ==
- EchoStar II, a 1990s communications satellite
- Echo (disambiguation)
