= Echo Church and School =

Historic church in Utah, United States

- U.S. National Register of Historic Places
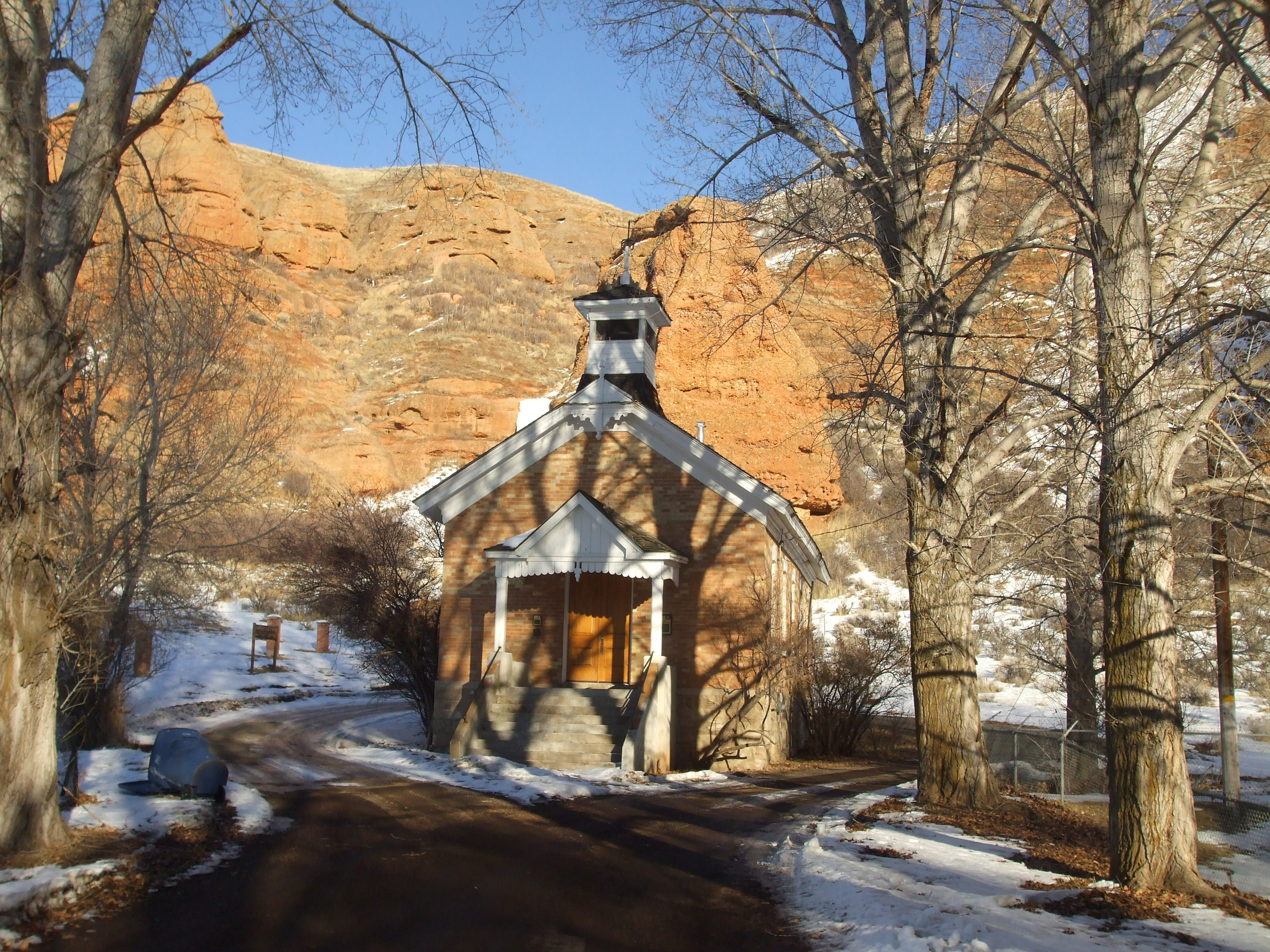
- Church in January, 2009

- Location within Utah Location within the United States
- Location: Temple Road, Echo, Utah
- Coordinates: 40°58′42″N 111°26′29″W
- Area: 1.5 acres (0.61 ha)
- Built: 1876
- Built by: Shill, John
- Architectural style: Late Gothic Revival
- NRHP reference No.: 88003000
- Added to NRHP: January 5, 1989

The Echo Church and School is a church and school building in Echo, Utah that includes Late Gothic Revival architecture from 1876. It was listed on the National Register of Historic Places (NRHP) in 1989.

Its two functions made it the center of community life at the turn of the twentieth century. The building was used mostly as a Presbyterian and Congregational church but also as a school, while a Latter-day Saints congregation later used it.

No other churches were constructed in Echo at any point in its history.
