= Camp Echo =

Camp Echo may refer to:

- Camp Echo (Guantanamo), used as an isolation unit, is a venue where detainees meet with their lawyers
- Camp Echo (Iraq), see Polish zone in Iraq
- Camp Five Echo
- Camp Echo Lake business
- Camp Echo Grove
- Camp Echo (Highasakite album)

== See also ==
- Echo Camp
