= Echo (radio station) =

Coordinates: 51°17′42.66″N 0°45′39.08″W

FCOT FM
- Farnborough, Hampshire; England
- Broadcast area: Rushmoor
- Frequency: 87.7 MHz

Programming
- Format: Music radio

Ownership
- Owner: Farnborough College of Technology

History
- First air date: May 1992
- Former call signs: FCT-FM; Passion; Echo FM
- Former frequencies: 100.5 MHz; 106.4 MHz; 106.8 MHz; 107.4 MHz; 107.8 MHz

Links
- Website: fcotfm.co.uk

FCOT FM and previously as FCT-FM, Echo FM and Passion is a community radio station broadcast for four weeks each year from two studios at Farnborough College of Technology. The station's management, presentation and production teams are entirely composed of further and higher education students. Throughout its annual broadcast, FCOT FM operates a 24-hour music radio service with live presenters from 7 am until 9 pm every weekday. Originally operating a highly localised service, the station now covers the entire Rushmoor area with a broadcast radius of approximately fifteen miles. Echo 2012 was set to be the biggest and best yet with a refurb on everything including the logo. The station now runs 24/7 during its licence period and ran from 27 February 2012 until 30 March 2012, with new imaging, a new website and a new presenter line-up. The radio station for 2013 was renamed to "FCOT FM". It will be returning for 2018 from 16 April until 11 May with brand new presenters and logo.

== History ==
FCOT FM was originally broadcast under the name FCT-FM, based on an abbreviation of Farnborough College of Technology where the station was, and is, based. It operated, and still operates, for four weeks per year on a Restricted Service Licence. The station first broadcast during May 1992, with 24-hour output starting in 1995. In 1994, the station was first sponsored by Guildford-based radio station County Sound; having originally broadcast with 1 Watt of power, from 1996 FCT-FM was awarded rights for a 15 Watt transmitter, funded by County Sound. Students also recover costs through additional sponsorship and advertising from local businesses. In the year 2000, FCT-FM was rebranded Passion; the same year, the station was nominated for the BBC Radio 1 Student Radio Station of the Year.

== Programming ==
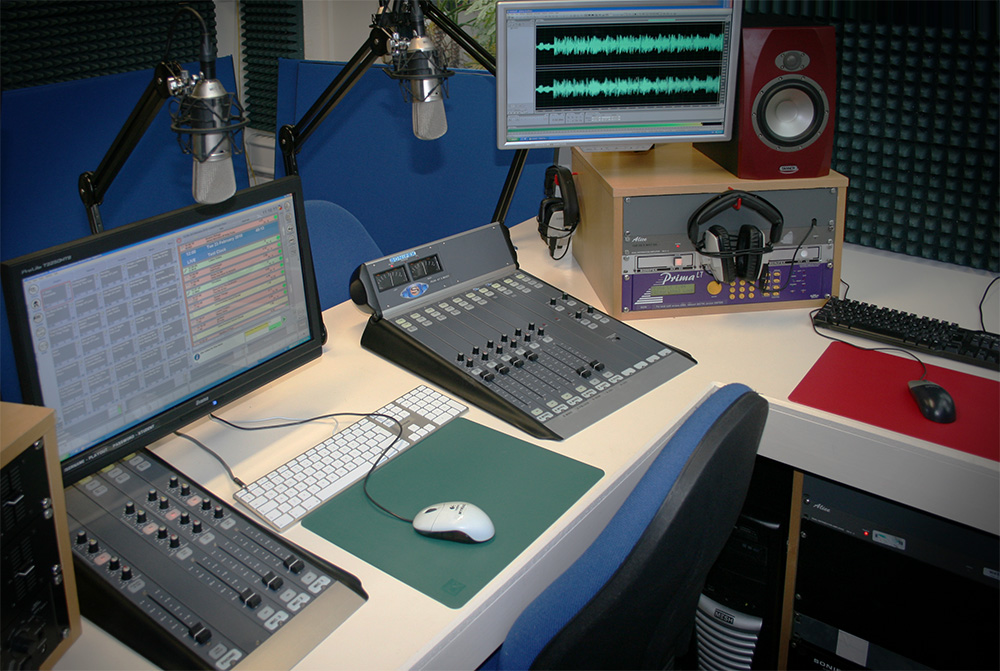
The primary broadcasting studio used for Echo since 2010. Visible are two microphones, computer screens and a mixing console.

2012's typical weekday's programming consists of four standard slots:

- Breakfast (7 – 10 am) hosted by Martin Willingham
- Mid-Morning (10 am – noon) hosted By Graham Cutbil-White
- Bitesize (noon – 1 pm)
- Afternoon (3 – 5 pm)
- Drivetime (5 – 7 pm Monday to Thursday, 4 – 5 pm Friday) hosted by Michael Pritchard
- (Weekly) Friday Afternoon Sports Show (1 pm – 3 pm) hosted by Tommy Anderson
- (Weekly) Monday Night Football (9 pm – 10 pm) hosted by Tommy Anderson

Invariably, the Breakfast, Mid-Morning, Afternoon and Drivetime shows have each had distinct on-air teams who present and produce content for the same timeslot each weekday throughout a given year's Echo run. Late Lunch programmes usually have different presenter(s) and producer(s) each weekday. Echo broadcasts a news bulletin hourly between 7 am and 7 pm inclusive, with information collated from both local sources and Independent Radio News (IRN). From 7 pm to 9 pm, Echo airs a range of specialist music programmes, each focussing on particular genre. The station also broadcasts a live-music focussed programme called Echo Sessions featuring live performances by Rushmoor-based bands. Since 2011, live studio-based output on a Friday has finished at 5 pm.

=== Academic work and weekends ===
The normal programming schedule is sometimes adjusted to accommodate 30–60 minute one-off programmes, produced as coursework by students of Farnborough College of Technology who are not necessarily otherwise involved in Echo. Such programmes were originally branded Lunchbox and now air as Bitesize. A significant academic link-up occurred during the final week of Echo in 2009; to cover the Rising Starz singing contest, Echo simulcast the audio from an internet TV stream produced by students of Media & Creative Arts as well as using their text message short code to collate votes. Finally, until the 2011 running of Echo the station operated a limited live output on Saturdays, with a Late Breakfast programme leading into sports-themed discussion show Saturday Sport. Live presenter-led output is supplemented by an automated music service overnight and at weekends.
