= ECHO IV =

ECHO IV, or ECHO 4 (Electronic Computing Home Operator, or Electronic Computer for Home Operation) is a prototype of a home computer developed by Westinghouse Electric engineer James (Jim) Sutherland in the mid-1960s (1965-1966).

== History ==
James Sutherland worked as an engineer for the American company Westinghouse Electric, designing fossil and nuclear power plant control systems. In 1959, the company built a computer called PRODAC IV (he was the designer of the arithmetic logic unit), using destructive-readout core memory and NOR logic.

When PRODAC IV was replaced by a UNIVAC design, some of the Westinghouse controller hardware was declared surplus in 1965. Sutherland took up surplus boards and memory to build a home computer, ECHO IV (the "IV" in ECHO IV came from the PRODAC IV). It was made public for the first time in 1966.

The computer was working in the Sutherland's house until 1976, and was donated to the Computer Museum in Boston in 1984.

== Technical specifications ==
- Processor
  - Transistorized (2N404), with RTL NOR logic elements
  - 120 circuit modules
  - 18 commands
  - 4 registers
- Add time: 216 μs
- Frequency: 160 kHz
- Main memory:
  - 8,192 15-bit words, magnetic core
- Input/Output:
  - paper tape reader and punch
  - keyboard made from parts of IBM Selectric typewriter
  - Kleinschmidt teleprinter
- Physical specifications:
  - Four large wooden cabinets, each with approximate dimension of:
    - Width: 4 feet
    - Height: 6 feet
    - Depth: 2 feet
  - Weight: about 800 pounds (360 kg)

== Uses ==
- Accounting
- Household inventory
- Calendar
- Manage all digital clocks through the house
- Real-time clock with delay of 1 second
- Air conditioning management
- TV and television antenna management; on school nights children were required to answer questions if they wanted to watch television
- Meteorological program for reading and storing data from a meteorological station that was connected to ECHO IV and weather forecast

== Bibliography ==
- Cortesi, Dave (Sep 2015). "The First Home Computer" (PDF). Volunteer Information Exchange. 5 (8): 2–3.
- Infield, Glenn (April 1968). "Science and inventions: A Computer in the Basement?". Popular Mechanics. 129 (4): 77–79, 209, 229.
- Tomayko, James E., ed. (1994). "Anecdotes: Electronic Computer for Home Operation (ECHO): The First Home Computer". IEEE Annals of the History of Computing. 16 (3): 59–61. doi:10.1109/mahc.1994.10011. ISSN 1058-6180.
