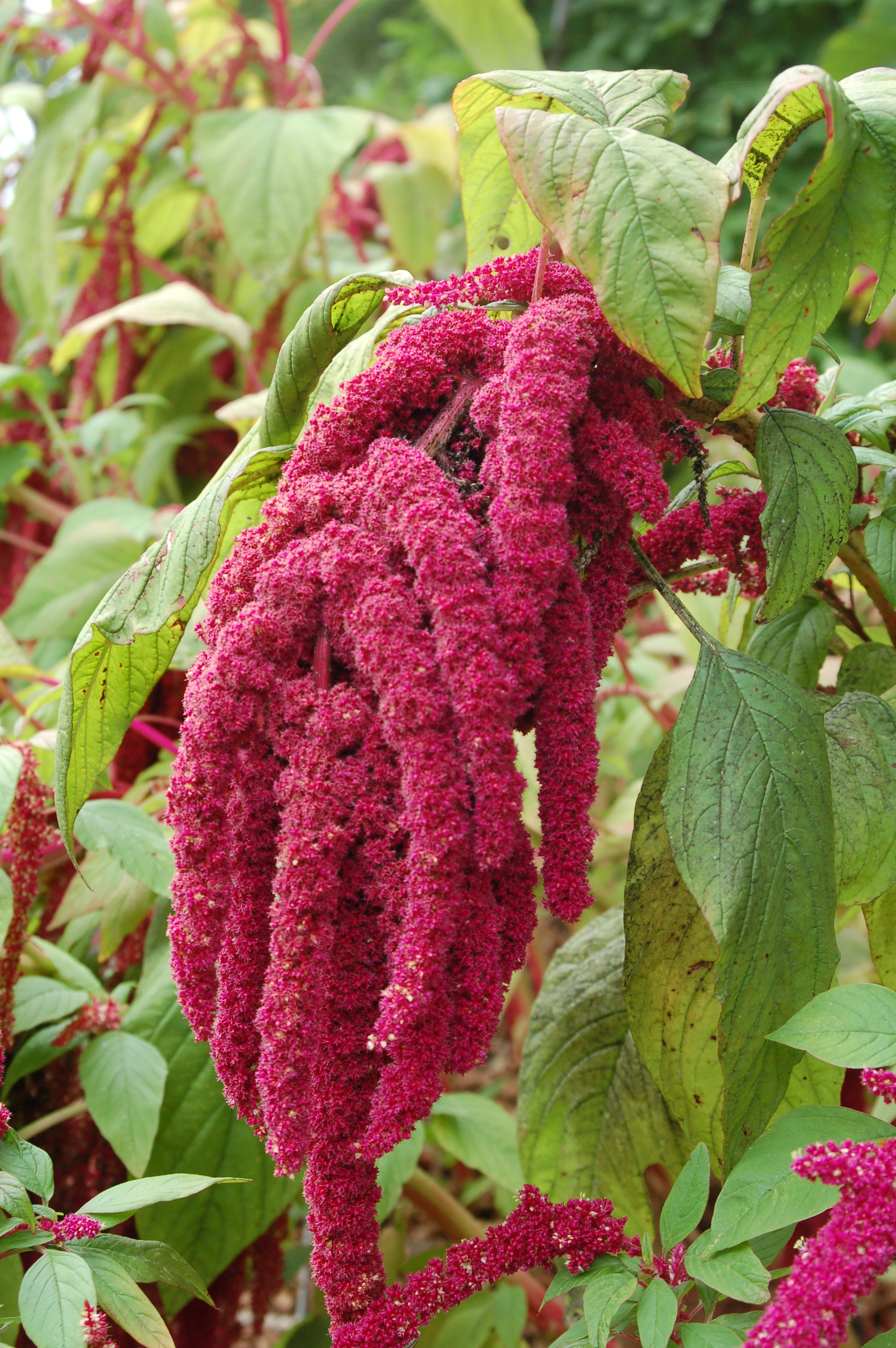
- Amaranthus caudatus growing in the Botanical garden, Bremen

Scientific classification
- Kingdom: Plantae
- Clade: Tracheophytes
- Clade: Angiosperms
- Clade: Eudicots
- Order: Caryophyllales
- Family: Amaranthaceae
- Genus: Amaranthus
- Species: A. caudatus

Binomial name
- Amaranthus caudatus L.

Synonyms
- List: Amaranthus abyssinicus L.H.Bailey; Amaranthus alopecurus Hochst. ex A.Br. & C.D.Bouché; Amaranthus cararu Moq.; Amaranthus dussii Sprenger; Amaranthus edulis Speg.; Amaranthus leucocarpus S.Watson; Amaranthus leucospermus S.Watson nom. illeg.; Amaranthus mantegazzianus Pass.; Amaranthus maximus Mill.; Amaranthus pendulinus Moq.; Amaranthus pendulus Moq.; Euxolus arvensis Rojas Acosta

= Amaranthus caudatus =

Love-lies-bleeding

Species of flowering plant

Amaranthus caudatus (also known as Amaranthus edulis and Amaranthus mantegazzianus) is an Andean species of annual flowering plant. It goes by common names such as love-lies-bleeding, pendant amaranth, tassel flower, velvet flower, and foxtail amaranth. In South America, it is known as kiwicha.

Many parts of the plant, including the leaves and seeds, are edible, and sometimes exported outside of Latin America.

== Description ==
A. caudatus is an annual, broad-leaved dicotyledon with a central stem that grows from a taproot system. Depending on the variety, A. caudatus can reach up to 2.5 metres (8 feet) tall. Leaves and side branches grow outward from the central stem and may start as low as the base of the plant.

A. caudatus is most recognizable for its striking flowering panicles that can reach up to 90 centimetres (35 inches) long. The colour of these highly dense flowering panicles ranges from black, to red and more commonly white. The red varieties of A. caudatus are due to a high content of betacyanins.

Each panicle is self-pollinating and the fruits each contain a single small seed, no larger than 1 millimetre (1/32 in) in diameter. Like quinoa, each seed has a shiny coat and the embryo is curved around the small endosperm. The panicles grow from lateral buds and from the main stem.

== Taxonomy ==
Like the other domesticated grain amaranth species (A. cruentus and A. hypochondriacus, both native to Central America), A. caudatus likely evolved from wild A. hybridus.

== Etymology ==
During the Victorian era, specific flowers had different meanings. Love-lies-bleeding stood for untenable romantic relationships or absence of desirable prospects in the Victorian language of flowers. Therefore, as the plant visually resembles droplets of blood and Puritan virtue names had been around since the 16th century, the name love-lies-bleeding is not unexpected.

== Distribution and habitat ==
A. caudatus is an indigenous crop from the high Peruvian Andes that has been cultivated for thousands of years by many cultures including the Incas. It is the only amaranth species that can grow at altitudes greater than 2,500 m (8,200 ft) above sea level.

== Cultivation ==
Despite the fact that A. caudatus had been a well-adapted staple in the Andean region for millennia and had offered substantial nutritional advantages to the native people, when the Spanish came in the 1500s, they replaced A. caudatus cultivations with wheat and barley. However, because of its great nutritional content, A. caudatus is regaining popularity and returning to compete with modern crops. Although A. caudatus is seldom recognized outside of the Andes, significant plantings have been observed in Mexico, China, Nepal, India and Kenya.

In most parts of its habitat, A. caudatus can easily grow between 1 and 2.5 m (3 1/2 and 8 ft) and grows best in full sun within 4–6 months. However, in some highland regions it can take up to 10 months. It is a summer annual C4 plant. It grows from Ecuador to northern Argentina mostly in mild areas or in the valleys of the Andes. Despite its geographical adaptability, it is a short-day plant and needs adequate moisture. Cultivation can occur at up to 3,100 m (10,200 ft) and once established it is drought tolerant and can handle both wet and dry conditions. If the cultivation takes place in subtropical climates, it can be harvested up to two times. Loam and loam-sandy soils with lots of organic matter and good drainage are best. Clay soils are not recommended for A. caudatus. In addition, the pH must be between 6–7, although the plant can still grow at a pH of up to 8.5.

The crop is planted by transfer, with the help of seedlings in fields or by direct drilling at the beginning of the rainy season. They are cut at a height of 10 to 55 cm (4 to 21 1/2 in) and the cultivation practices are similar to those of corn: ear emergence, two-stage fertilization and weed control. In the Andes of Peru, Bolivia, Ecuador and Argentina, the plant is grown in the traditional way on non-irrigated land without fertilizers. The seeds are very small, so soil preparation is important, such as breaking up of clods and shaking up. It is recommended to plough the soil, harrow and make furrows either in the traditional way with a yoke or by machine.

Weed control takes place manually with pricking out. In the absence of rain, irrigation is necessary every 30 days and especially in flowering and grain filling stages. Harvesting is done before full maturity of the plant. In this process, the plants are cut 50 cm above the ground. They are collected in furrows until they dry and then hit with sticks. In this process, they are placed on clothing or tamped floors for threshing and sieved so that the seeds can be separated from the dead leaves. Improvement of cultivation consists in proper soil preparation and direct sowing of selected seeds at a density of 4 to 6 kg/ha in 80 cm wide furrows, using fertilizers according to the nutrient content of the soil. The yield varies between 2,000 and 5,000 kg/ha in Peru and 900 to 4,000 kg/ha in Ecuador.

=== Genetics ===
All species of amaranth have a diploid chromosome set but a different number of chromosomes. In A. caudatus the number is 2n = 32.

=== Pests and diseases ===
The most common diseases affecting the seeds are Pythium spp. and Fusarium spp. Fungal diseases such as Sclerotinia spp. and Alternaria spp. cause stem and root rot. The most common pest is Diabrotica spp, also known as Loritos, which can damage the plant during emergence. Other pests include Agrotis spp. and Eupicata spp. Blister beetles (Epicauta adspersa) and red weed caterpillar (Loxostege bifidalis) were also found in some countries. They caused severe defoliation of the upper leaves. These pests are controlled by the application of 1.5% diatomaceous earth.

== Food ==
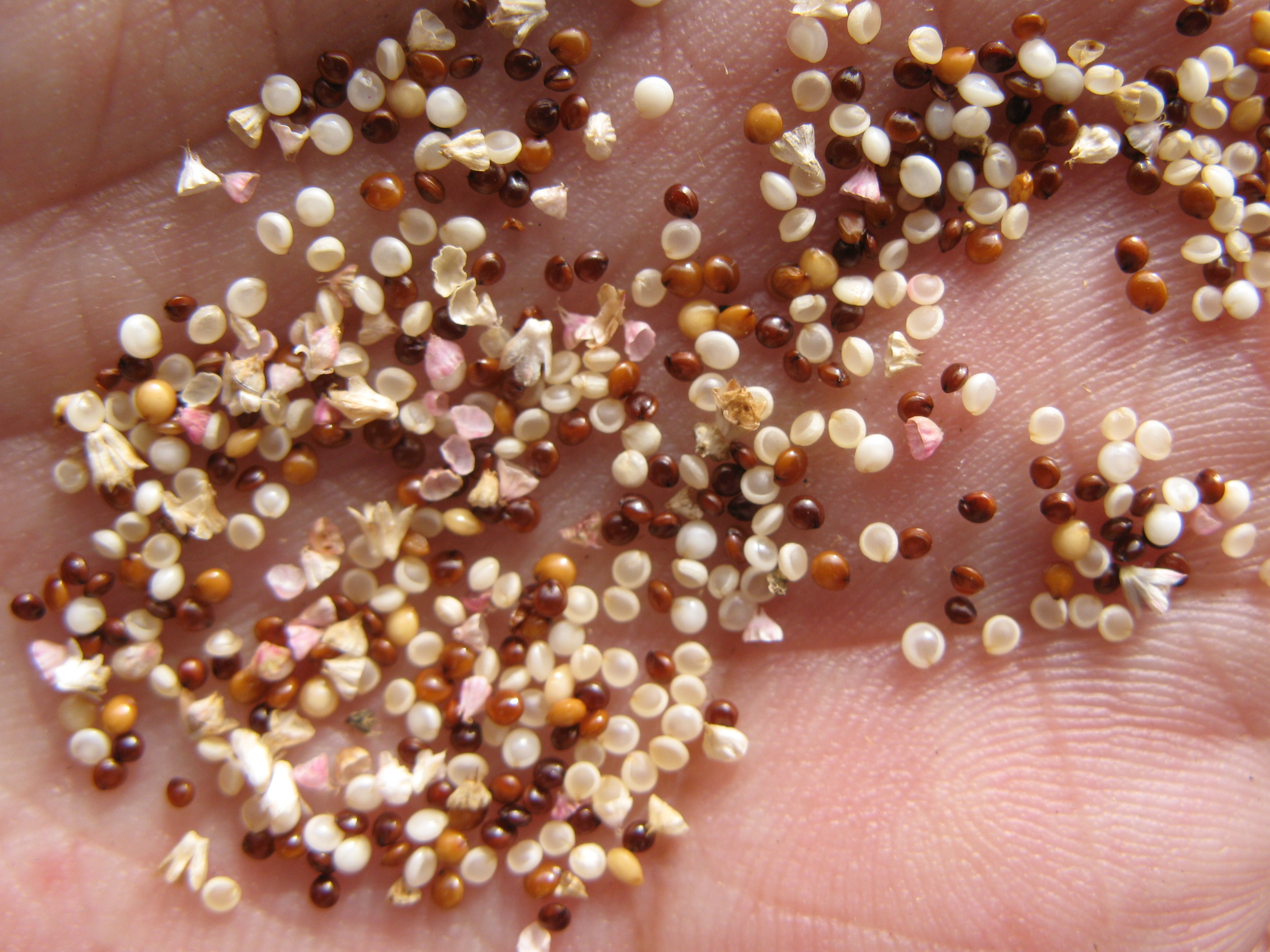
Amaranthus caudatus grain

=== Nutrition ===
The flavourful and gluten-free A. caudatus is very high in protein and essential amino acids, such as lysine, which are typically deficient in plant protein. In terms of nutritional content, A. caudatus protein is virtually similar to milk protein (casein), and it complements the nutritional quality of foods derived from flours of corn, rice, or wheat. As a result, A. caudatus is particularly beneficial for infants, children, and pregnant and lactating women, but also vegetarians and vegans.

A. caudatus is high in dietary fiber and minerals such as iron, magnesium and manganese. Its frequent consumption could help to reduce hypertension and cholesterol. A. caudatus has also been found to have anthelmintic, antinociceptive, antipyretic, anticancer, antiallergenic, antidiabetic, immune system stimulation, cardioprotective, hepatoprotective, and antibacterial properties.

=== Culinary use and dishes ===
There are several uses of kiwicha. When ground, it can be used as flour but also as breading for sweets and main dishes when crushed. Seeds can be popped like popcorn in a pan and, like oats, it can be eaten with milk as cereal.

In Mexico, A. caudatus is used on sweets with honey; the dish is called alegria ('happiness' in Spanish). India has a similar dish called ladoos. A. caudatus is slowly making its way outside of Latin America. Cookies and other breakfast food made of kiwicha can be found, for example, in stores in the United States. Even though kiwicha is gluten-free, adding kiwicha flour to wheat when producing leavened food increases the nutritional value of the bread. As flour, A. caudatus is also used for pasta and noodles.

Due to the food's nutritional value, scientists have explored the substitution of amaranth leaves for certain vegetables in traditional Kenyan traditional dishes. They have also investigated whether the vitamins and minerals remain when boiled, for instance. Depending on the vegetables used in the mix, mineral and iron uptake can be improved.

== Other uses ==
=== Animal feed ===
After the A. caudatus grains have been removed, the remaining plant material (stover) can be used for fodder. During dry seasons when forage is limited, fodder from A. caudatus stover is an essential source of animal feed for Andean farmers to maintain their livestock.

Additionally, A. caudatus can be suitable to be used as a high-protein forage crop in the tropics.

=== Natural dye ===
In Peru, simple methods have been developed to extract betalain from red varieties of A. caudatus to be used as non-toxic red food colouring. For some applications, this natural dye may be used to replace the use of synthetic dyes. However natural dyes tend to have a lower colour fastness and therefore may not function well as a direct substitution.

== Regional names ==
To the Quechua people of South America, A. caudatus is referred to as kiwicha, quihuicha, inca jataco; ataco, ataku, sankurachi, jaguarcha (Ecuador), millmi, or coimi. While to the Aymara people, who are native to the Andes and Altiplano regions of South America, A. caudatus is known as qamasa.
