= Daily Echo =

The Daily Echo is the name of two daily tabloid newspapers in southern England owned by Newsquest.

- Bournemouth Daily Echo, covers south-east Dorset
- Southern Daily Echo, covers Southampton and Hampshire, excluding Portsmouth
