= Echo School (Echo, Utah) =

- U.S. National Register of Historic Places
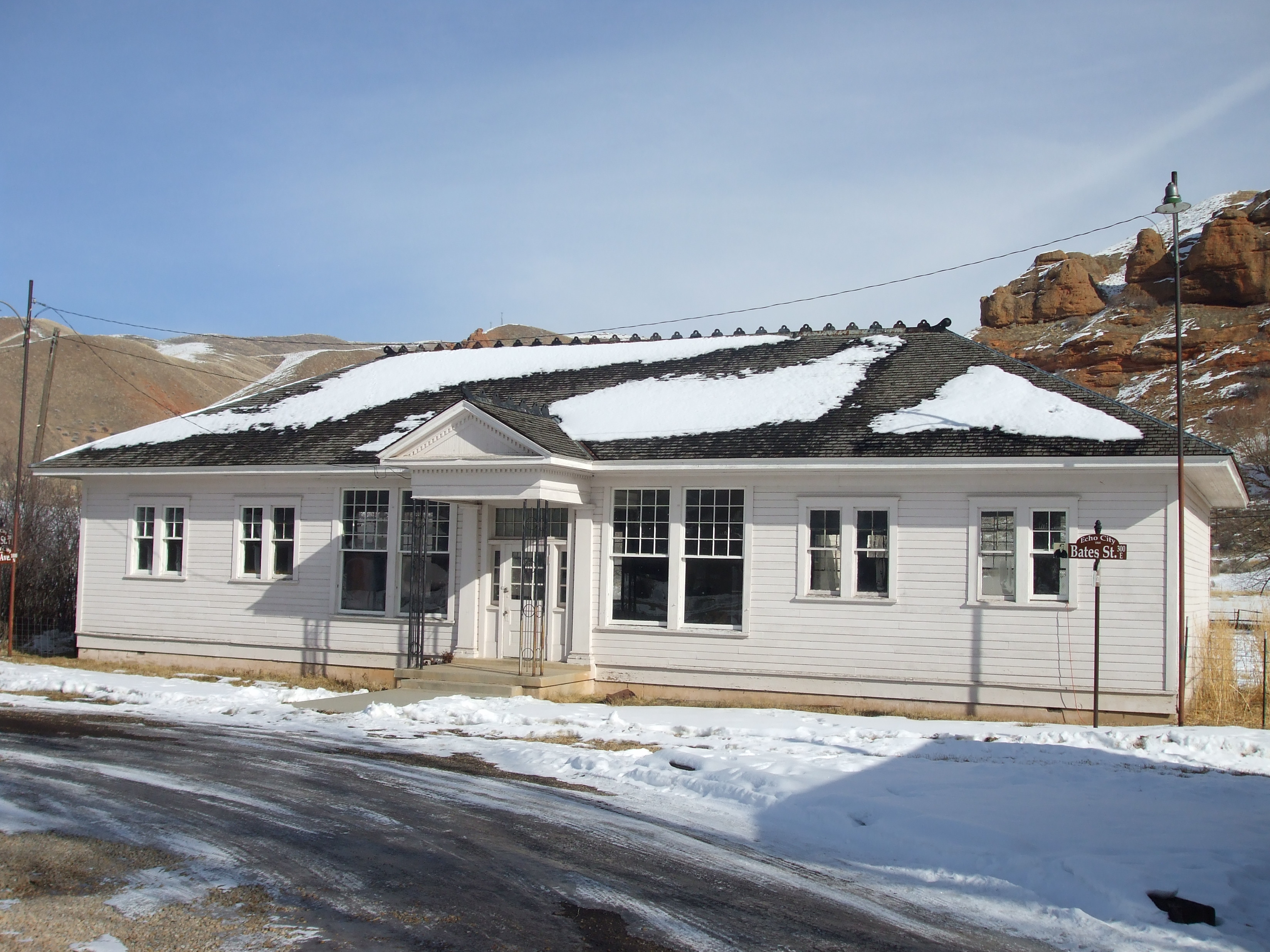

- Location within Utah Location within the United States
- Location: 3441 S. Echo Rd., Echo, Utah
- Coordinates: 40°58′43″N 111°26′37″W
- Area: 1.5 acres (0.61 ha)
- Built: 1914
- Architectural style: Late 19th and 20th Century Revivals, Classical Revival, Late 19th and Early 20th Century American Movements
- NRHP reference No.: 97000805
- Added to NRHP: August 1, 1997

The Echo School, located at 3441 S. Echo Rd., in Echo, Utah is a historic two-room schoolhouse that was built in 1914 and used as a school into the 1940s. It was listed on the National Register of Historic Places in 1997.

It's a one-story building with a hipped roof in a rural setting. The building was moved to make way for a highway developed in 1955; it was then placed on a concrete foundation and otherwise improved. It was then used for community functions and as a Veterans of Foreign Wars meeting hall. It was used less in those ways from about 1970 on.

It was deemed significant in 1997 as Echo's only surviving purpose-built school.
