= HMS Echo =

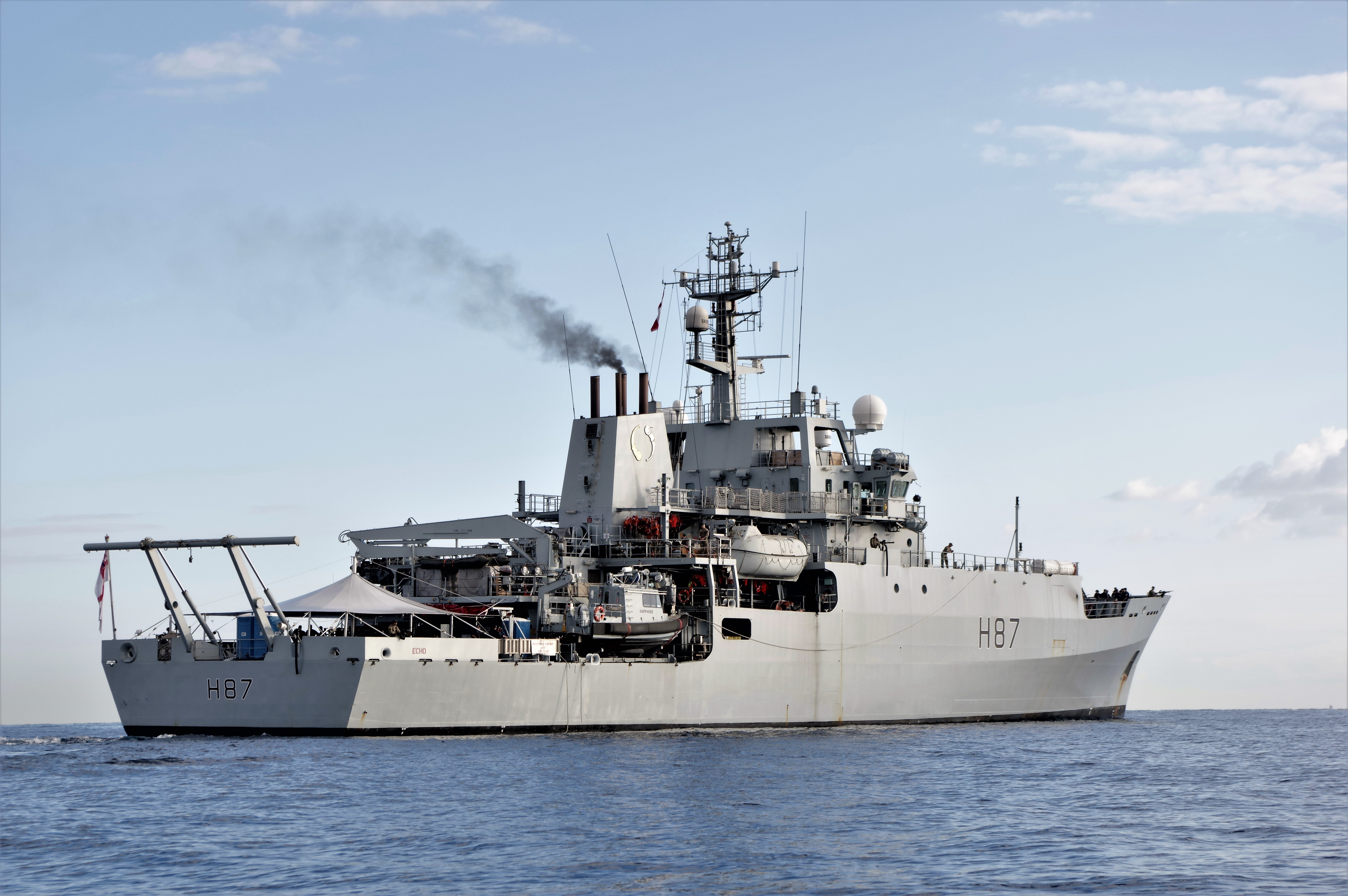
HMS Echo (H87) under sail from Valletta, Malta in 2016

A number of ships of the Royal Navy have been named HMS Echo, after the Echo of Greek mythology.

- HMS Echo (1758) was a 24-gun sixth rate captured from France in 1758 and sold in 1770.
- HMS Echo (1780) was the French Cerf-class brig-rigged cutter Hussard, of eighteen 6-pounder guns, launched in 1779 or '80 and captured on 7 July 1780.
- HMS Echo (1782) was a 16-gun sloop launched in 1782 and broken up in 1797.
- HMS Echo (1797) was a 16-gun sloop launched in 1797 and sold in 1809. She then became a whaler before she was wrecked in 1821.
- HMS Echo (1809) was an 18-gun Cruizer-class brig-sloop launched in 1809 and broken up in 1817.
- HMS Echo (1827) was a wooden paddle vessel launched in 1827, converted to a tugboat in 1830, and sold in 1885.
- HMS Echo (H23) was an E-class destroyer launched in 1934 and on loan to the Greek Navy from 1944 to 1956, then broken up.
- HMS Echo (A70) was an Echo-class survey vessel launched in 1957 and sold in 1986.
- HMS Echo (H87) is an Echo-class hydrographic survey ship, launched in 2002 and decommissioned in June 2022.

== Other ships ==
In addition to these ships, a number of vessels have been taken up from trade and named Echo while in government service:

- Echo was a dockyard tank vessel previously named Luda. She was purchased in 1887 and sold in 1928.
- Echo was a whaler, previously named Barrowby, built in 1912 at Oslo, and of 182 tons (BRT). She was purchased in January 1915 at Durban, South Africa, one of several purchased there and then. During her naval service she was armed with one 12-pounder gun and two 3-pounders, and served in East Africa, particularly in operations in the Rufiji River in 1915. The Admiralty sold her on 6 March 1919 back to her owners, Irvin & Johnson, who returned her name to Barrowby.
- Echo was a trawler launched in 1897, of 165 tons (BRT), and with Hull-reg H.367; she was hired between 1915 and 1921 and served as a boom defense vessel.
- Echo was a drifter, formerly a French minesweeper seized in 1940, renamed Resound later that year, and returned in 1946.

== Battle honours ==
Ships named Echo have earned the following battle honours:

- Quebec 1759
- Martinique 1762
- Havana 1762
- Cape of Good Hope 1795
- Atlantic 1939
- Norway 1940
- Bismarck 1941
- Arctic 1941-43
- Malta Convoys 1942
- Sicily 1943
- Salerno 1943
- Aegean 1943
