= Echo Canyon Reservoir State Wildlife Area =

Fishing lake and birding area in Archuleta County, Colorado

Coordinates: 37.213°N 106.994°W

Echo Canyon Reservoir State Wildlife Area is a fishing lake and birding area in Archuleta County, Colorado. It is stocked with rainbow trout, largemouth bass, yellow perch, green sunfish, and channel catfish.

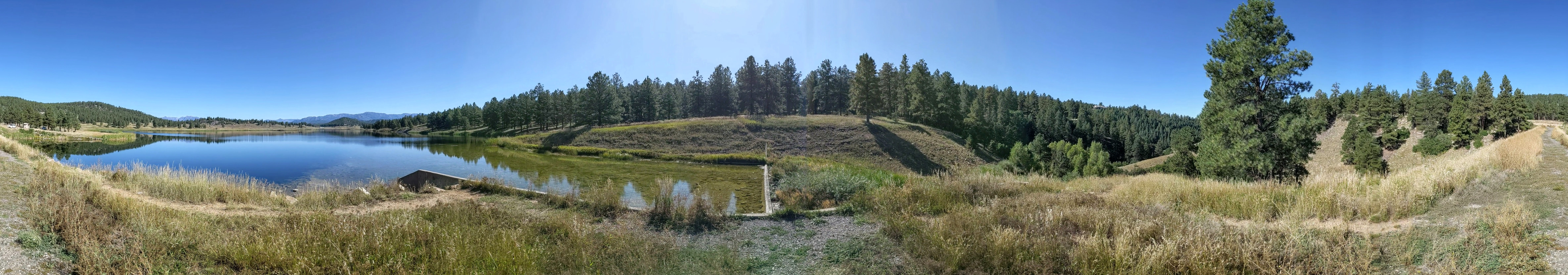
Echo Canyon Reservoir and dam, with Echo Canyon to the right
