= Echo Bay =

Echo Bay may refer to

== United States ==
- Echo Bay, Nevada
- Echo Bay (Long Island Sound)

== Canada ==
- Echo Bay, British Columbia
- Echo Bay, Ontario
- Echo Bay, Saskatchewan
- Echo Bay Mines
- Port Radium, Northwest Territories
