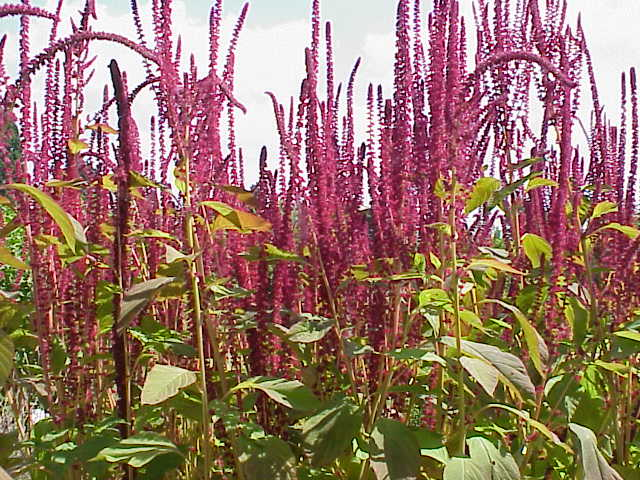

Scientific classification
- Kingdom: Plantae
- Clade: Tracheophytes
- Clade: Angiosperms
- Clade: Eudicots
- Order: Caryophyllales
- Family: Amaranthaceae
- Genus: Amaranthus
- Species: A. cruentus

Binomial name
- Amaranthus cruentus L.

Synonyms
- Synonyms list: A. anacardana Hook.f.; A. arardhanus Sweet; A. carneus Moq.; A. esculentus Besser ex Moq.; A. farinaceus Roxb. ex Moq.; A. guadeloupensis Voss; A. guadelupensis Moq.; A. incarnatus Moq.; A. montevidensis Moq.; A. paniculatus L.; A. purgans Moq.; A. rubescens Moq.; A. sanguineus L.; A. sanguinolentus Schrad. ex Moq.; A. speciosus Sims; A. spicatus Wirzén; A. strictus Willd.

= Amaranthus cruentus =

Blood amaranth

Species of flowering plant

Amaranthus cruentus is a flowering plant species that is native from Central Mexico to Nicaragua. It yields a nutritious staple amaranth grain, being one of three Amaranthus species cultivated as a grain source, the other two being Amaranthus hypochondriacus and Amaranthus caudatus. It has several common names, including blood amaranth, red amaranth, purple amaranth, prince's feather, and Mexican grain amaranth.

== Description ==
Amaranthus cruentus is a tall annual herb topped with clusters of dark pink flowers. The plant can grow up to 2 m (6 ft) in height, and blooms in summer to fall. It is believed to have originated from Amaranthus hybridus, with which it shares many morphological features.

== Uses ==
This species was in use as a food source in North America and Central America as early as 4000 BC. The seeds are eaten as a cereal grain. They are black in the wild plant, and white in the domesticated form. They are ground into flour, popped like popcorn, cooked into a porridge, or made into a confectionery called alegría. The leaves can be cooked like spinach, and the seeds can be germinated into nutritious sprouts. While A. cruentus is no longer a staple food in North and Central America, it is still grown and sold as a health food.

It is an important crop for subsistence farmers in Africa.

In Chhattisgarh, red amaranth is used to make Lal Bhaji, a stir-fried dish. In Maharashtra, during the month of Shravan, a stir-fried vegetable with just grated coconut is served during festivals. The stem is used in a curry made with Vaal hyacinth bean.

Among the Zuni people, the feathery part of a plant is ground into a fine meal and used to color ceremonial bread red. The crushed leaves and blossoms are also moistened and rubbed on cheeks as rouge.

In the Kinnaur District of Himachal Pradesh (India), the grain is used to make kheer and served mostly as dessert during marriage ceremonies. The flour is also used to make deep-fried chapatis (pole).

== Cultivation ==
In addition to being cultivated as a grain and or vegetable, A. cruentus is often cultivated as an ornamental plant, valued for its feather-like flowering plumes. It is usually grown from seed as a half-hardy annual, that is sown under glass in early spring and planted out in summer. Numerous cultivars have been developed, of which the following have gained the Royal Horticultural Society's Award of Garden Merit:

- 'Autumn Palette Group' (earth colours – rust, cream, brown)
- 'Oeschberg' (crimson flowers)
- 'Velvet Curtains' (deep red/crimson)
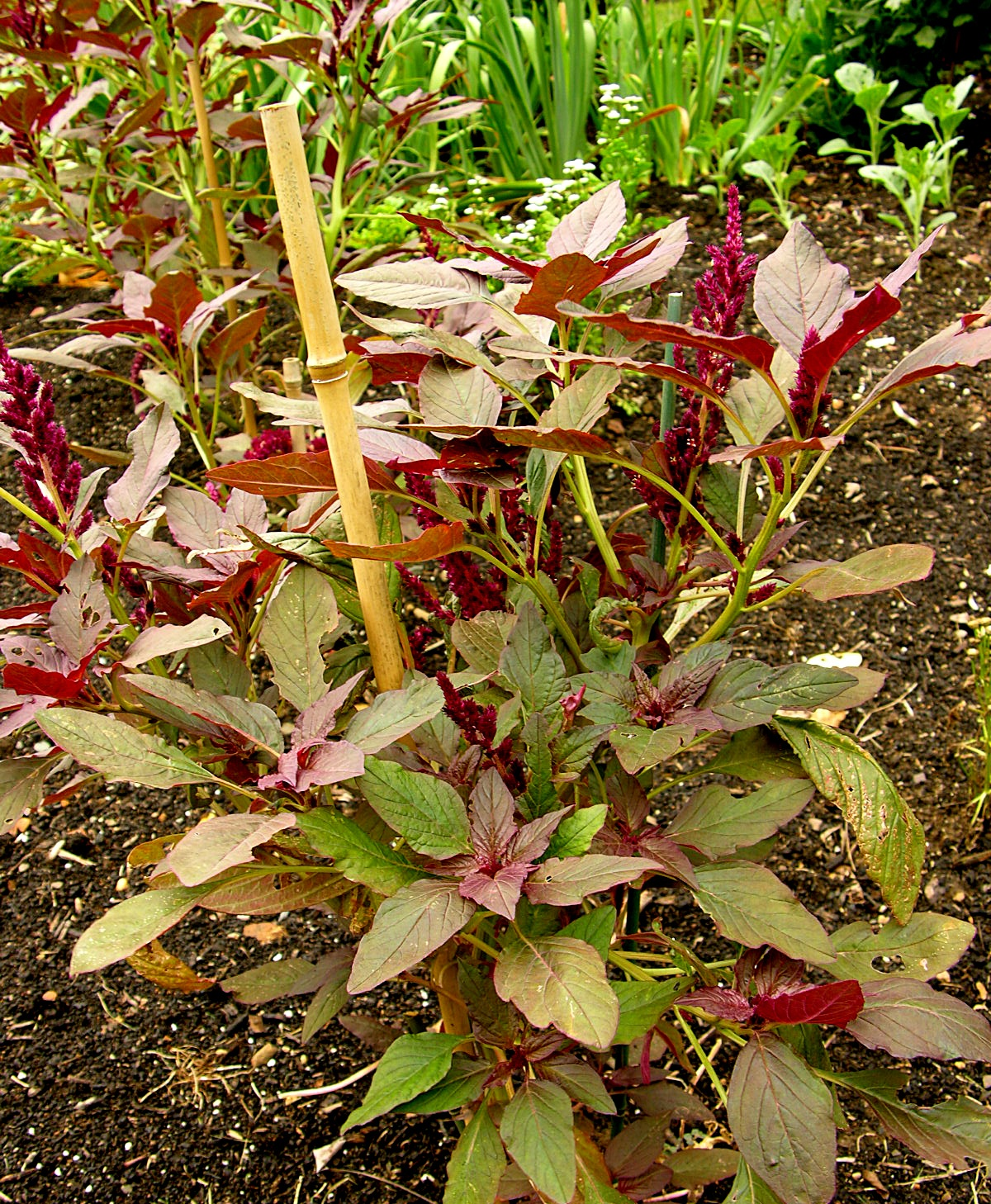
Amaranthus cruentus 'Oeschberg' foliage

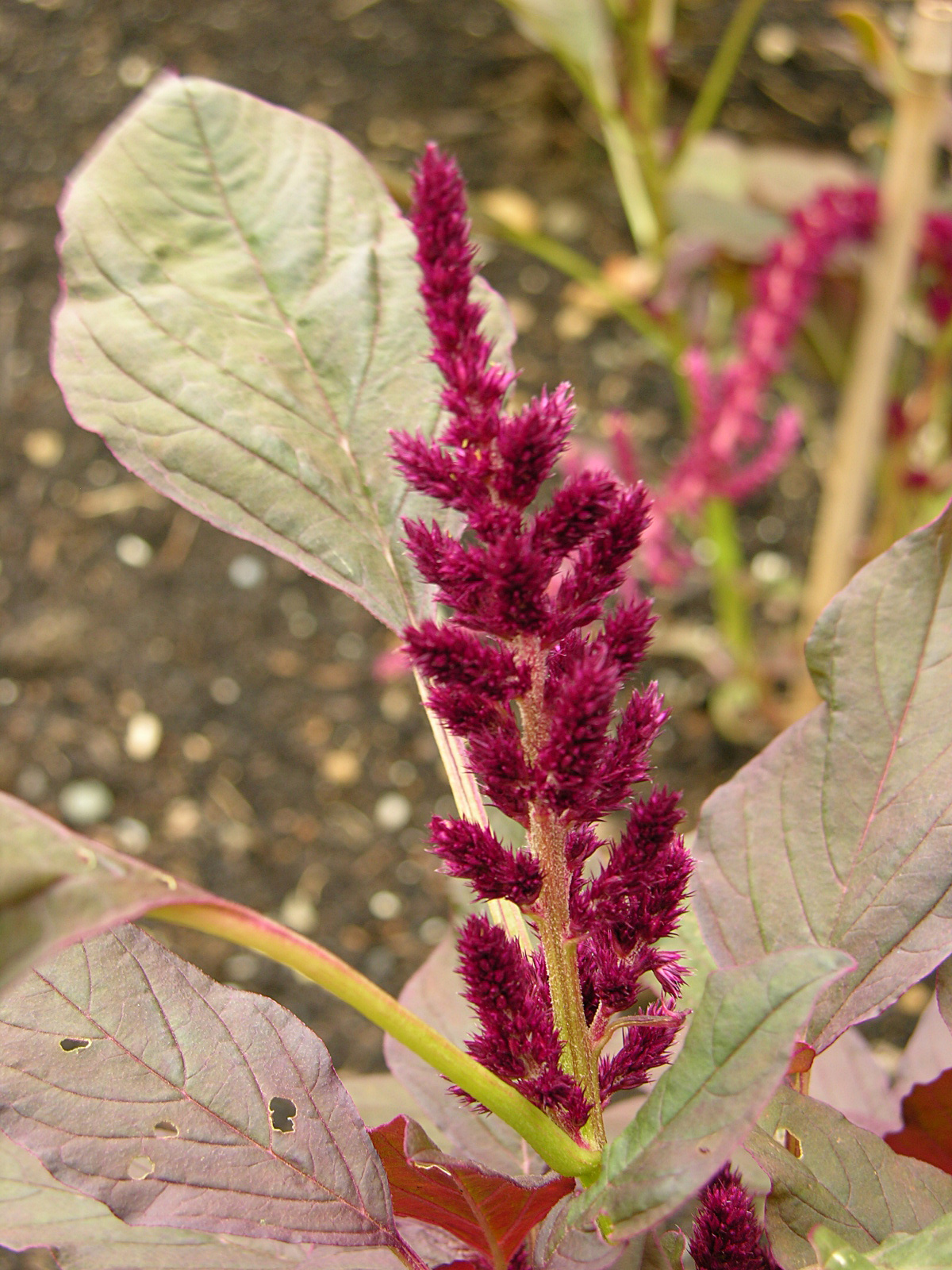
Amaranthus cruentus 'Oeschberg' flowerhead

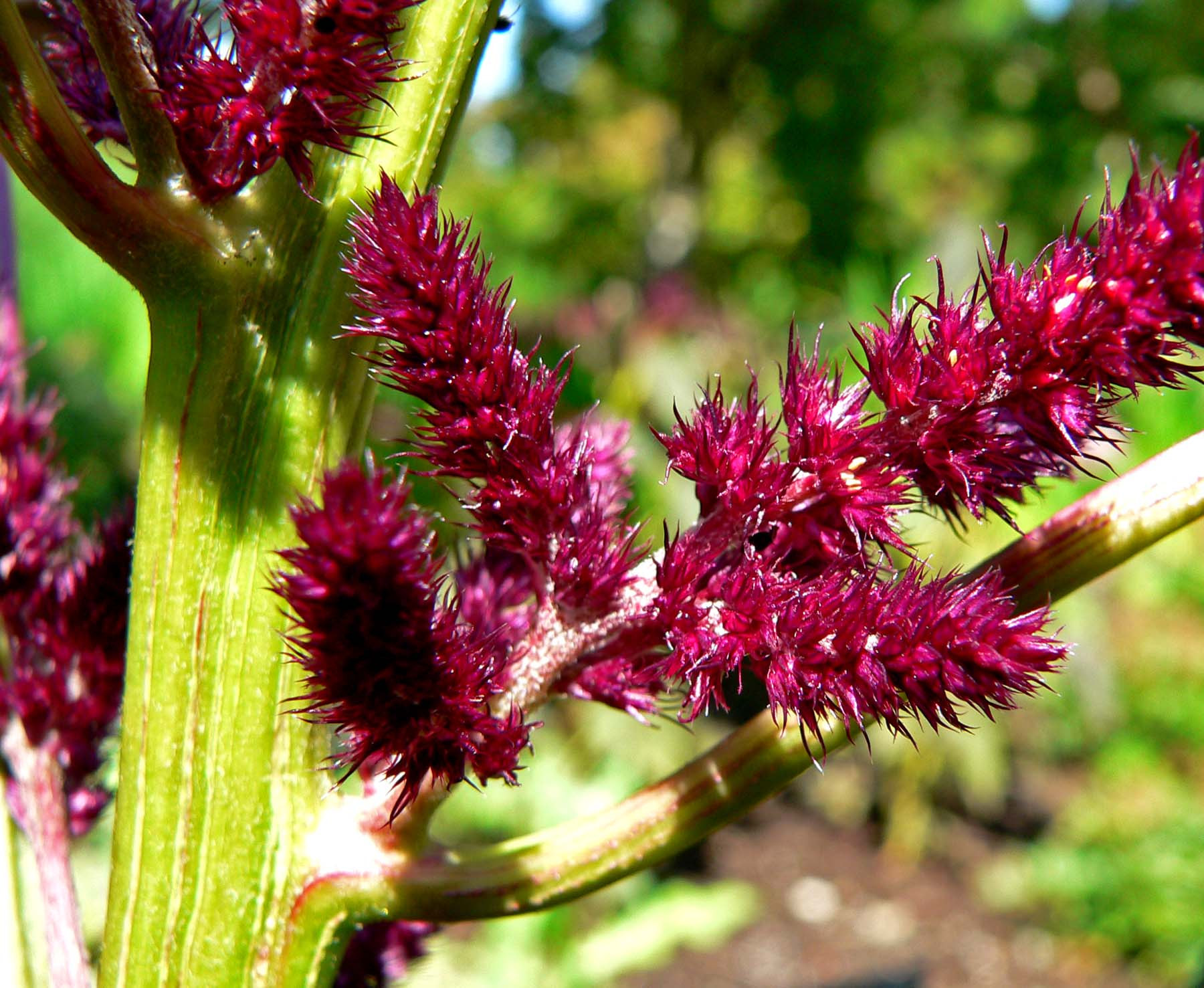
Amaranthus cruentus 'Foxtail' flower closeup
