= Iván Madarász =

Hungarian composer (born 1949)

Iván Madarász (born 1949, Budapest) is a Hungarian composer.

== Recordings ==
- Madarász: Concerto F(L)A, Embroidered Sounds, Echo, Speeds for Two Flutes, Chapters of a Story. Hungarian State Orchestra, Bartók Youth Symphony Orchestra, Miskolc Symphony Orchestra, László Tihanyi, Tibor Szabó, László Kovács (musician) Hungaroton.
