= Echo Eggebrecht =

American painter

- Born: 1977 (age 48–49); Bangor, Maine, U.S.
- Known for: Painting

Echo Eggebrecht (born 1977) is an American artist and academic known for landscape paintings.

== Education ==
Eggebrecht earned a BFA from the School of the Art Institute of Chicago and an MFA from Hunter College. She also attended the Skowhegan School of Painting and Sculpture, Skowhegan, Maine.

== Career ==
Her artist residencies have included the Bemis Center for Contemporary Art, Omaha, NE and the Fine Arts Work Center in Provincetown, Massachusetts. She is represented by Horton Gallery, New York.

She has held solo exhibitions at Horton Gallery, New York; Nicole Klagsbrun Gallery, New York; Ter Caemer Meert Contemporary, Kortijk, Belgium; Sixtyseven, New York and Sixspace in Los Angeles as well as group exhibitions at the Brooklyn Academy of Music; ICA; Nicole Klagsburn; and White Box in New York City; Groeflin Maag Gallery in Basel, Switzerland, Poets on Painters at the Ulrich Museum and the Flinn Gallery at the Greenwich Library.

In a review in The New York Times of Eggebrecht's solo show at Gallery Sixtyseven, Roberta Smith wrote that Eggebrecht her art "favors empty landscapes, whose roiled grass is meticulously rendered and dotted with wry contradictions and bits of Americana." Another reviewer, John Haber, feels that Eggebrecht's paintings tell detailed, if disturbing, stories. Much of her art is small-scale and she favors a faux-naive or surreal style.

Eggebrecht has worked as a painting instructor at Tyler School of Art and Architecture at Temple University and as an assistant professor of Art at Carnegie Mellon University.

=== Notable exhibitions ===
- Spells, Spoils & Lucky Charms, Horton Gallery, New York
- Next Wave Art, Brooklyn Academy of Music, Brooklyn, New York
- Poets on Painters, Ulrich Museum, Wichita, KS and The Queens Library Gallery, New York, NY
- The Golden Record, Lincoln Museum, Edinburgh, UK
