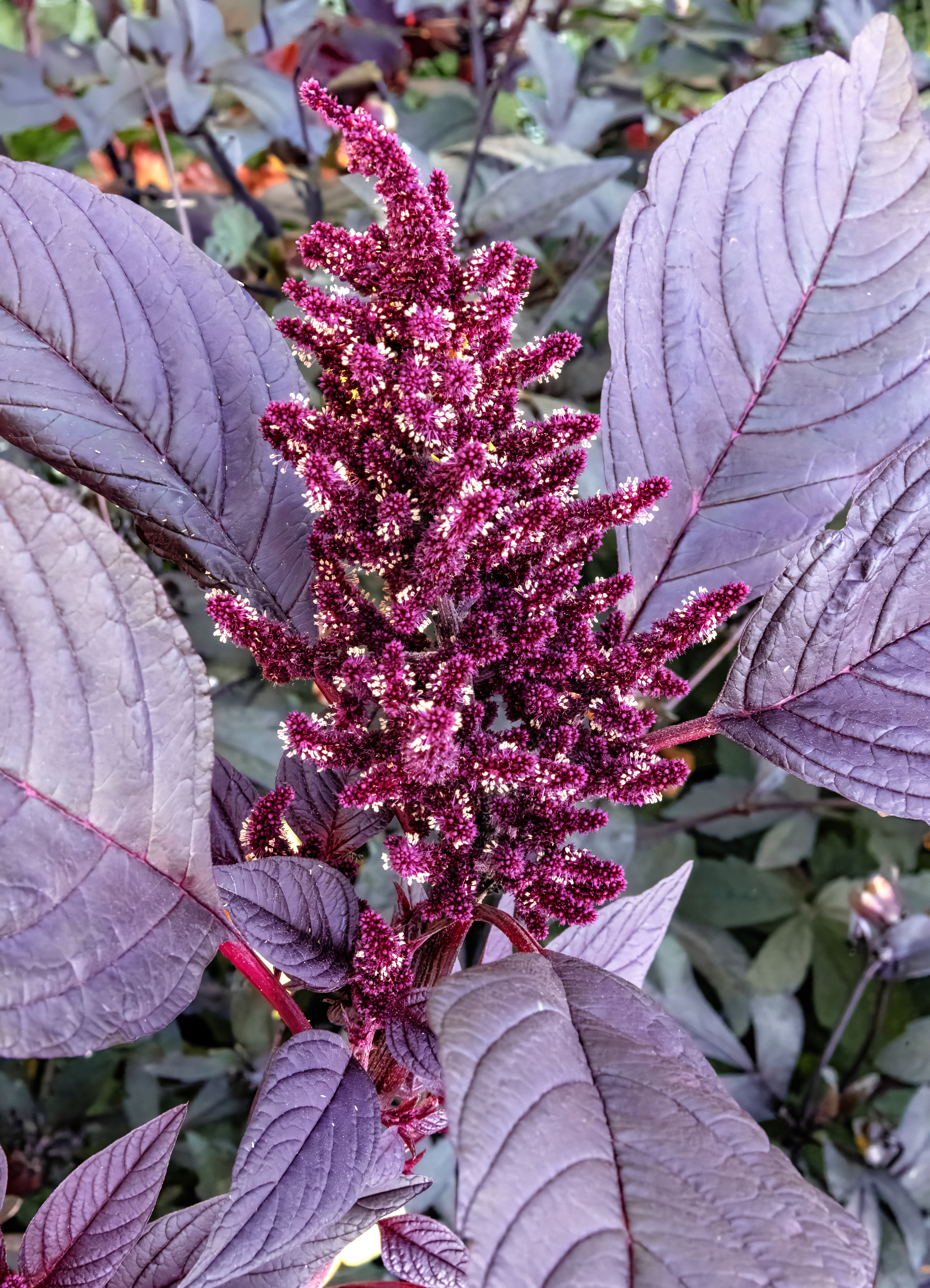

Conservation status
- Apparently Secure (NatureServe)

Scientific classification
- Kingdom: Plantae
- Clade: Tracheophytes
- Clade: Angiosperms
- Clade: Eudicots
- Order: Caryophyllales
- Family: Amaranthaceae
- Genus: Amaranthus
- Species: A. hypochondriacus

Binomial name
- Amaranthus hypochondriacus L.

Synonyms
- List: Amaranthus anardana Buch.-Ham. ex Moq.; Amaranthus atrosanguineus Moq.; Amaranthus aureus Besser; Amaranthus bernhardii Moq.; Amaranthus flavus L.; Amaranthus frumentaceus Buch.-Ham. ex Roxb.; Amaranthus hybridus Vell. nom. illeg.; Amaranthus hybridus var. erythrostachys Moq.; Amaranthus hybridus f. hypochondriacus (L.) H.Rob.; Amaranthus hybridus var. hypochondriacus (L.) H.Rob.; Amaranthus hybridus subsp. hypochondriacus (L.) Thell.; Amaranthus hybridus var. leucocarpus (S.Watson) Hunz.; Amaranthus leucocarpus S.Watson; Amaranthus leucospermus S.Watson; Amaranthus macrostachyus Mérat ex Moq.; Amaranthus monstrosus Moq.

= Amaranthus hypochondriacus =

Species of flowering plant

Amaranthus hypochondriacus is a domesticated plant commonly used for its grain or as an ornamental. When grown as an ornamental, its common names include Prince-of-Wales feather or prince's-feather. It is called quelite, bledo and quintonil in Spanish.

== Description ==
A. hypochondriacus is a vigorous, upright plant that typically reaches 40–200 cm (15–80 in) tall. It is often grown for its flowers, which appear in dense, catkin-like inflorescences in the summer and autumn. They are usually deep purplish-red, but may be yellow-green. These give way to dry fruits, about 1.5–3 mm (1/16–1/8 in) long, that split open when ripe. The fruits contain smooth, shiny seeds that may be subglobose to lenticular, either whitish-pink or dark reddish-brown to black, and 1–1.4 mm (3/64–1/16 inch) in diameter. The leaves are simple and alternately arranged, with entire margins. They are rhombic-ovate to broadly lanceolate in shape, about 4–12 cm (1 1/2–4 1/2 inches) long and 2–7 cm (1–3 inches) wide, borne on long peduncles.

== Taxonomy ==
Originally endemic to Mexico, A. hypochondriacus likely evolved from A. hybridus, with which it continues to readily hybridize. A. hybridus also gave rise to the other grain amaranth species, including A. cruentus, also native to Central America, and A. caudatus, native to South America.

== Uses ==
In temperate regions, it is cultivated as a half-hardy annual plant. Numerous cultivars have been selected, of which 'Green Thumb' and 'Pygmy Torch' have gained the Royal Horticultural Society's Award of Garden Merit. It grows best in well-drained soils in full sun, and is suitable for USDA hardiness zones 3–10. It may be susceptible to aphids.

In Africa and El Salvador, like many other species in the family Amaranthaceae, it is valued as source of food. The leaves and seeds are very nutritious and have a mild flavor. The seeds also contain phenolic compounds.

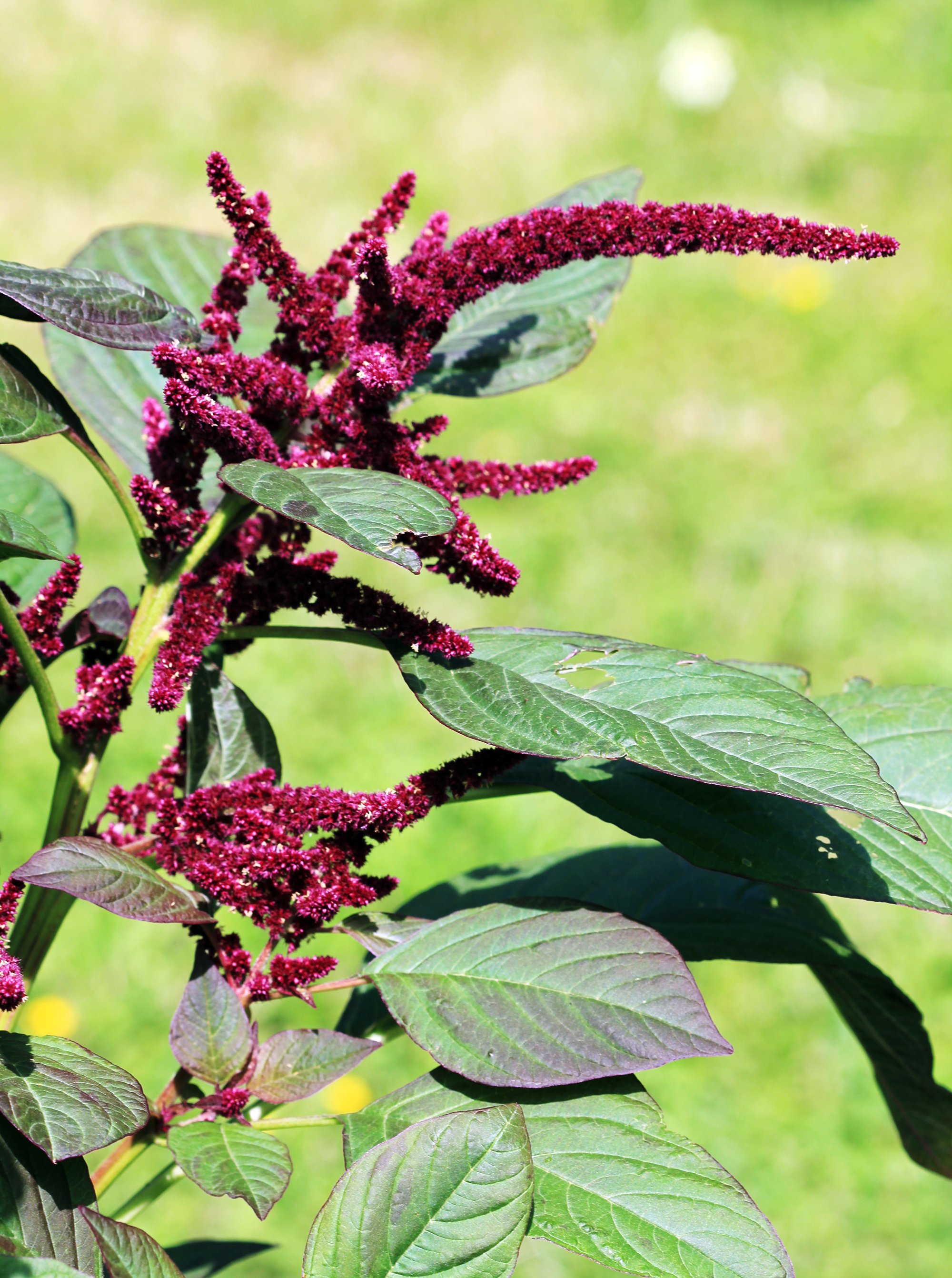
Inflorescence of A. hypochondriacus
