= Echo, Inyo County, California =

Extinct hamlet in California, U.S.

Echo is a former settlement in Inyo County, California, United States.

It was located on the crest of the Funeral Mountains above Death Valley, halfway between Lee and Schwaub.

Echo never had any buildings, only tents which workers of the Inyo Gold Mining Company would set up and disassemble, although a telephone line between Lee and Schwaub cut through the town. Echo was not to last as more profitable prospects could not be found in the area. A few items remain of the town, including a pair of former tent sites and can dumps as well as some shattered glass.

The site of Echo is within Death Valley National Park.

== See also ==
- List of ghost towns in California
