= Educational Concerns for Hunger Organization =

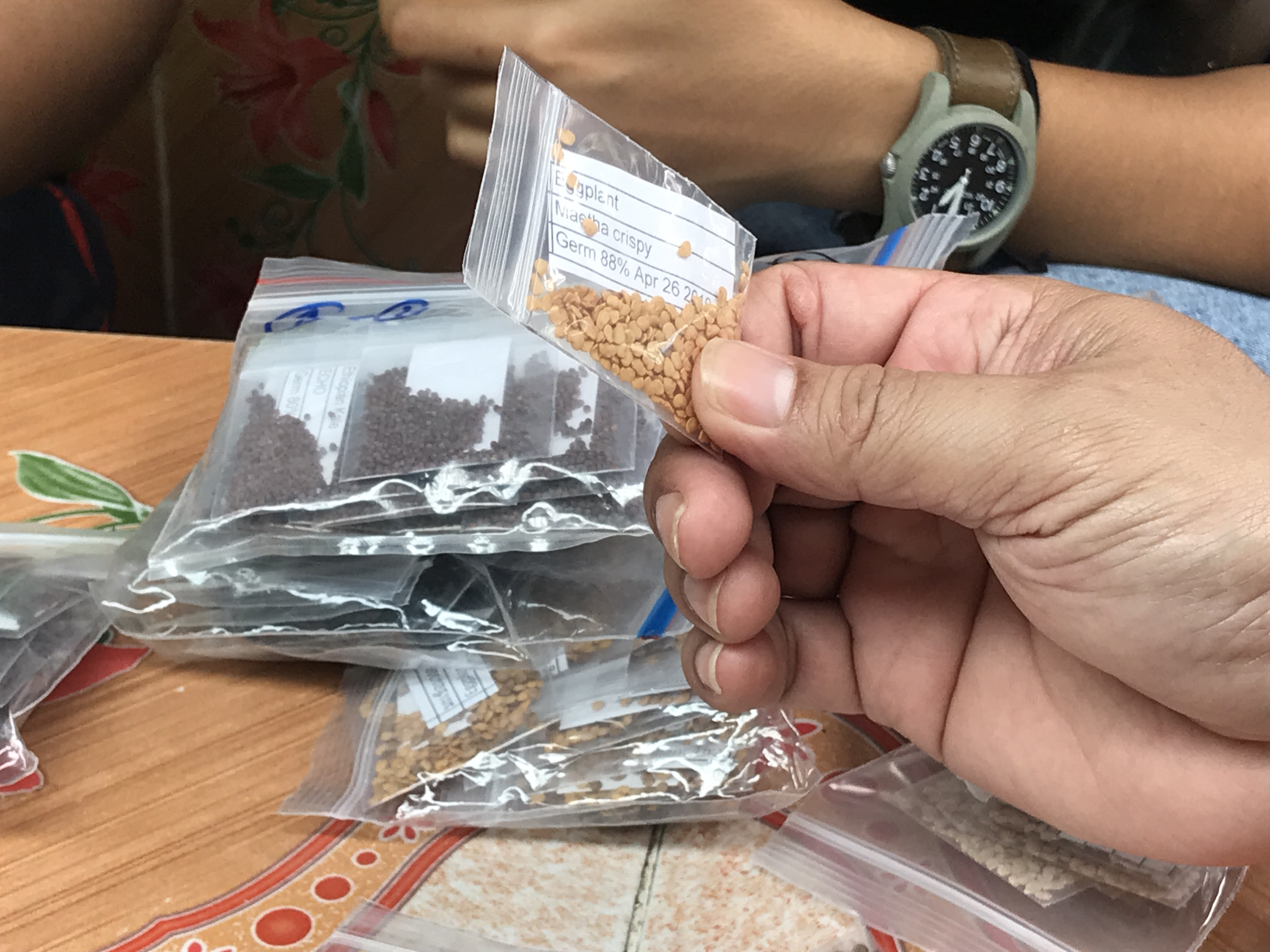

ECHO, Inc #echofightshunger is a non-profit agro-ecological organization whose mission is to support small-scale farmers through the dissemination of information and underutilized plant seeds. The group operates several seed banks worldwide which preserves biodiversity and seed sovereignty. ECHO also offers training courses and workshops on many topics, including tropical agriculture.

== Headquarters and North America Impact Center ==
ECHO is headquartered in North Fort Myers, Florida. Its 56-acre campus houses the North America Impact Center, a demonstration and research farm, a reference library with a variety of resources about rare agricultural crops and techniques, a seed bank, a tropical fruit nursery with a large collection of bamboo varieties, and a bookstore. The North America Impact Center also includes an appropriate technology center developing tools and equipment for small scale farmers. Various parts of the farm demonstrate agriculture in different conditions including highlands, lowlands, semi-arid and a demonstration of the techniques of urban agriculture that have been implemented around the world.

== Regional Impact Centers ==
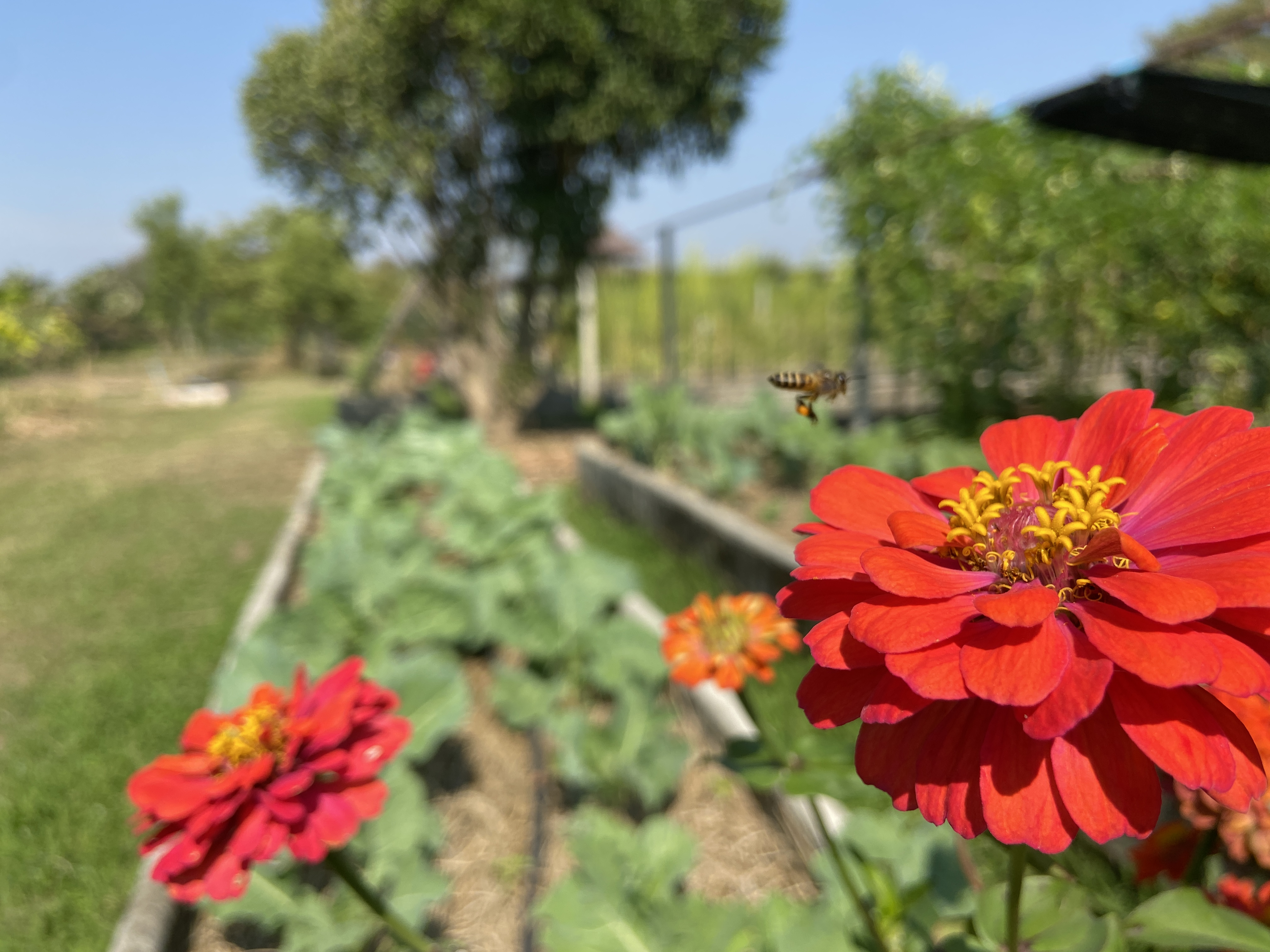

In addition to the North America Impact Center, ECHO operates three other Regional Impact Centers to bring agricultural resources to small-scale farmers in the surrounding areas/regions of Chiang Mai, Thailand (Asia Impact Center), Arusha, Tanzania (East Africa Impact Center), and Ouagadougou, Burkina Faso (West Africa Impact Center).

== Seed distribution ==
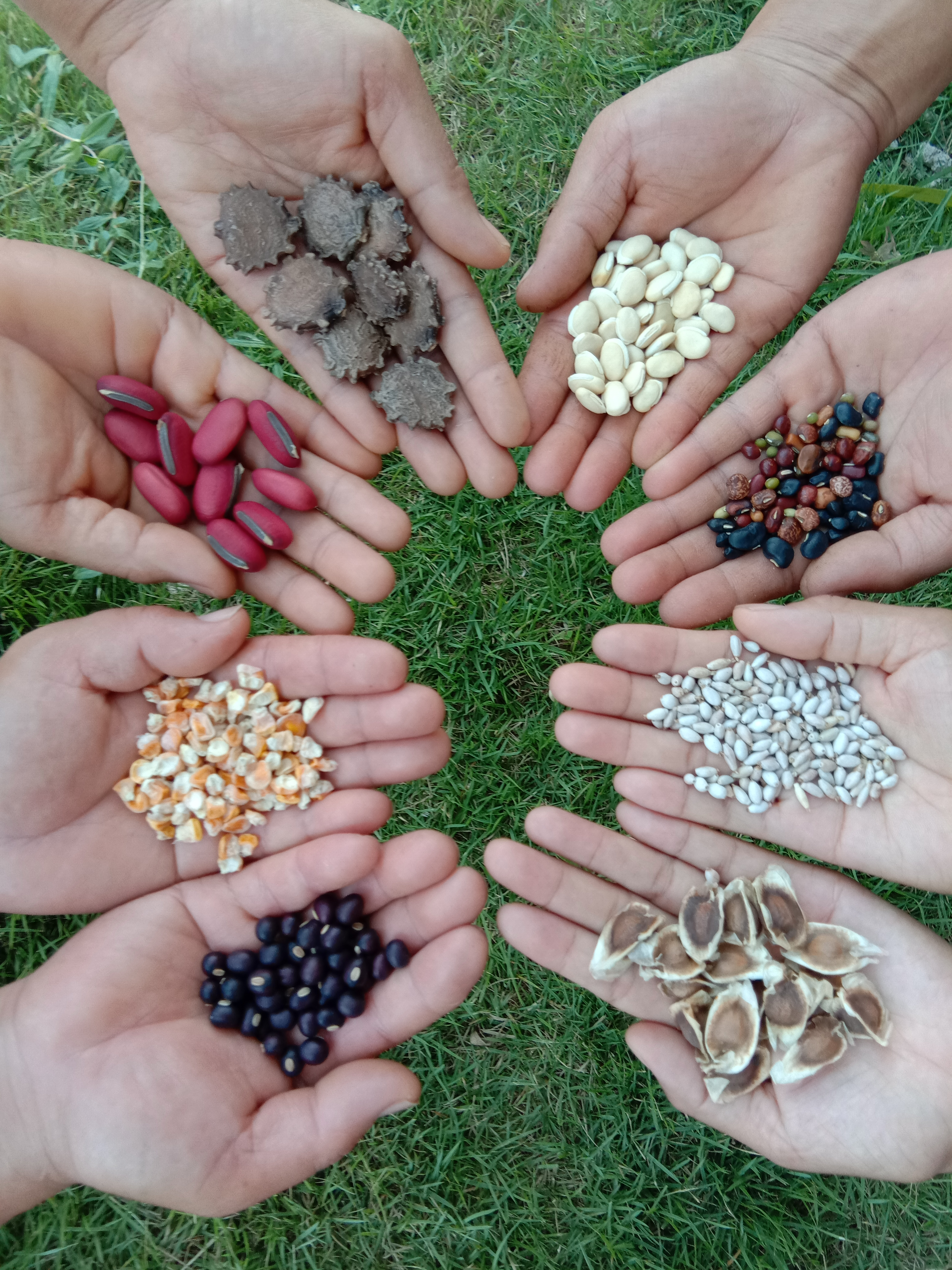

ECHO maintains a collection of useful tropical trees and other plants and provides seed and cuttings, free of charge, to individuals actively involved in agricultural development, with the intention that these open-pollinated seeds will be harvested from the resulting crops and distributed in the communities. For example, ECHO disseminates seeds and information about Moringa oleifera, a nutritional plant species useful for providing essential vitamins and minerals for people in developing countries in the tropics. To order seeds from ECHO as an active development worker, create an account on ECHOcommunity.org and request seeds through the website. Free trial packets can be received once per year.

== Technical Notes ==
ECHO publishes a series of technical notes that cover a variety of topics related to appropriate technology, agroecology and agroforestry.

== See also ==
- Agroecology
- Sustainable development
- Appropriate technology
