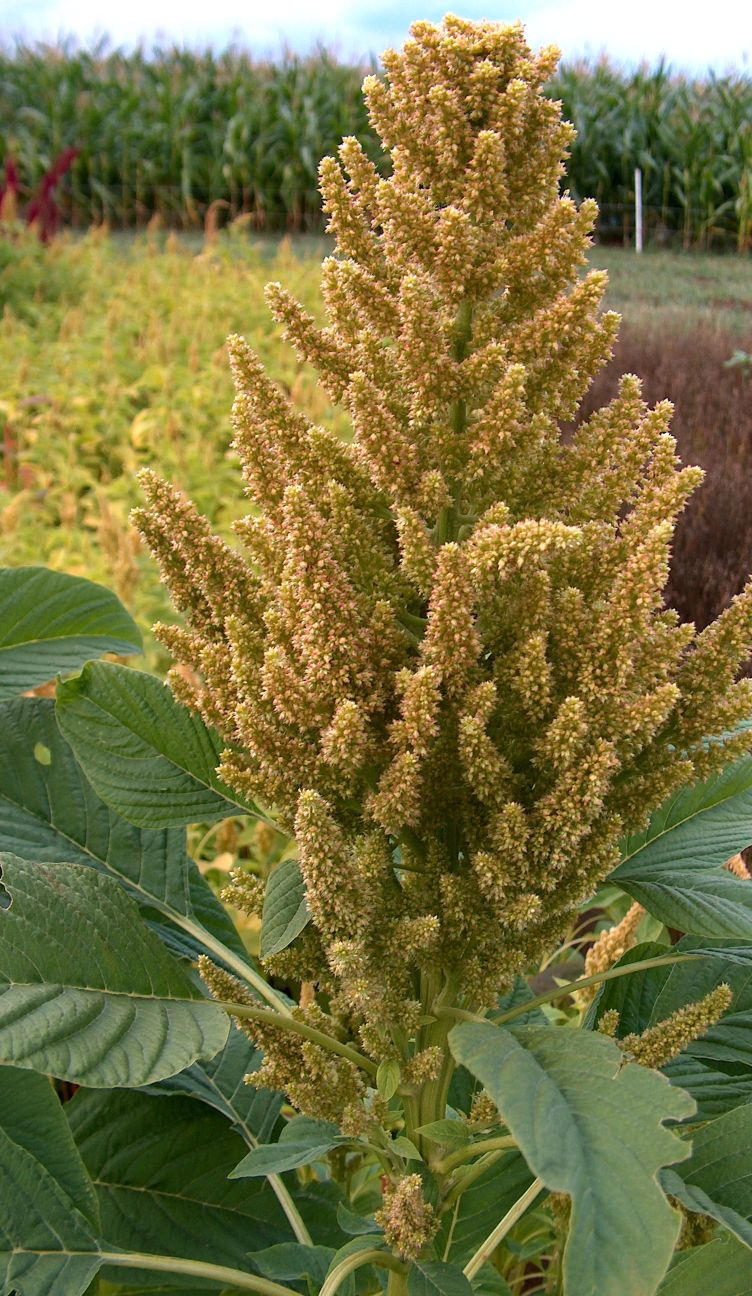

Conservation status
- Secure (NatureServe)

Scientific classification
- Kingdom: Plantae
- Clade: Embryophytes
- Clade: Tracheophytes
- Clade: Angiosperms
- Clade: Eudicots
- Order: Caryophyllales
- Family: Amaranthaceae
- Genus: Amaranthus
- Species: A. hybridus

Binomial name
- Amaranthus hybridus L.

Synonyms
- List: Amaranthus aureus Moq.; Amaranthus batalleri Sennen; Amaranthus bellardii Moq.; Amaranthus berchtholdii Moq.; Amaranthus catechu Moq.; Amaranthus caudatus Baker & Clarke; Amaranthus chlorostachys Willd.; Amaranthus eugenii Sennen; Amaranthus flavescens Moq.; Amaranthus hecticus Willd.; Amaranthus incurvatus Trimen ex Gren. & Gord.; Amaranthus intermedius Guss. ex Moq.; Amaranthus laetus Willd.; Amaranthus laxiflorus Comelli ex Pollini; Amaranthus neglectus Moq.; Amaranthus nepalensis Moq.; Amaranthus paniculatus var. sanguineus Regel; Amaranthus patulus f. multispiculatus (Sennen) Priszter; Amaranthus patulus var. multispiculatus Sennen; Amaranthus pseudoretroflexus (Thell.) Almq.; Amaranthus quitensis Kunth; Amaranthus retroflexus var. chlorostachys A. Gray; Amaranthus retroflexus var. hybridus A. Gray; Amaranthus retroflexus subsp. quitensis (Kunth) O.Bolòs & Vigo; Amaranthus spicatus Rchb.; Amaranthus timeroyi Jord. ex Moq.; Amaranthus trivialis Rota; Galliaria hybrida (L.) Nieuwl.

= Amaranthus hybridus =

Species of flowering plant

Amaranthus hybridus, commonly called green amaranth, slim amaranth, smooth amaranth, smooth pigweed, or red amaranth, is a species of annual flowering plant. It is a weedy species found now over much of North America and introduced into Europe and Eurasia.

== Description ==
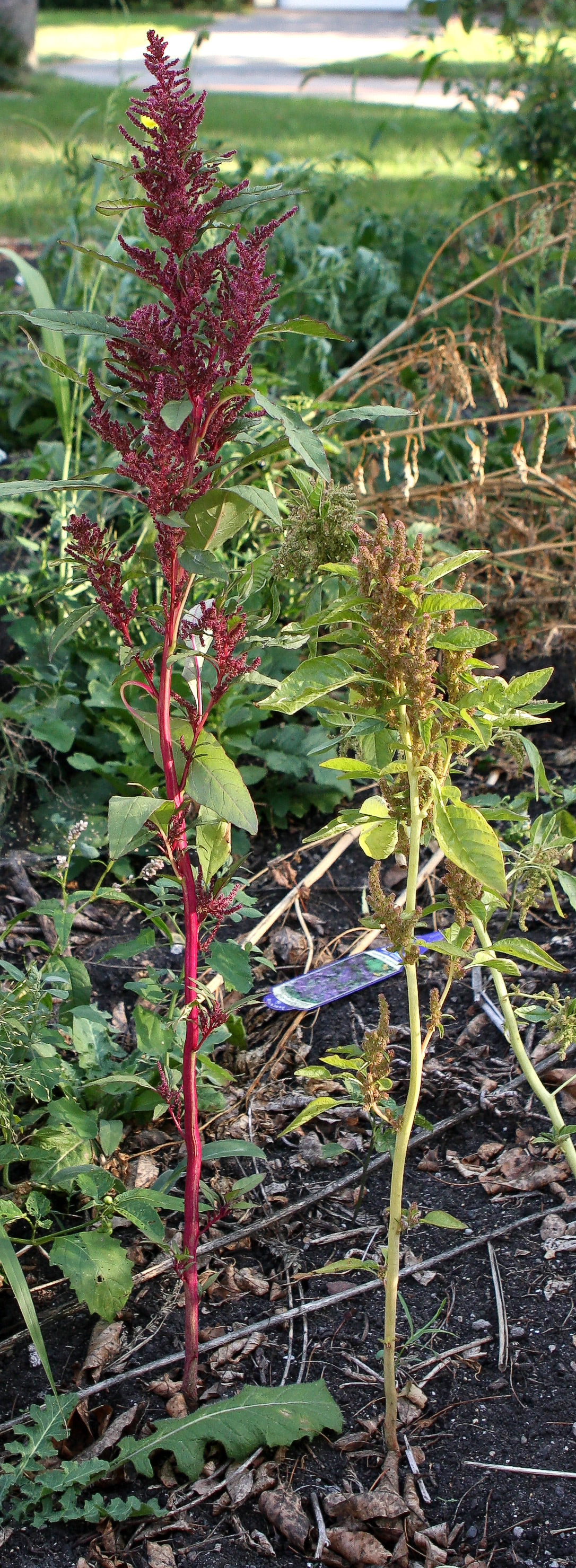
Amaranthus hybridus

Amaranthus hybridus grows from a short taproot and can be up to 2.5 m (8 ft 2 in) in height. It is a glabrous or glabrescent plant.

== Distribution ==
Amaranthus hybridus was originally a pioneer plant in eastern North America. It has been reported to have been found in every state except Wyoming, Utah, and Alaska. It is also found in many provinces of Canada, and in parts of Mexico, the West Indies, Central America, and South America. It has been naturalized in many places of warmer climate. It grows in many different places, including disturbed habitats.

== Taxonomy ==
It is extremely variable, and many other Amaranthus species are believed to be natural hybridizations or derive from A. hybridus.

== As a weed ==
Although easily controlled and not particularly competitive, it is recognized as a harmful weed of North American crops.

== Uses ==
The seeds and cooked leaves are edible.

The plant was used for food and medicine by several Native American groups and in traditional African medicine. It is among the species consumed as Quelite quintonil in Mexican food markets. It has weak antimicrobial activity, but contains promising anti-cancer phytochemicals.
