= Blue panicgrass =

Blue panicgrass is a common name for several plants and may refer to:

- Panicum antidotale, native to India and Pakistan
- Panicum coloratum, native to Africa
