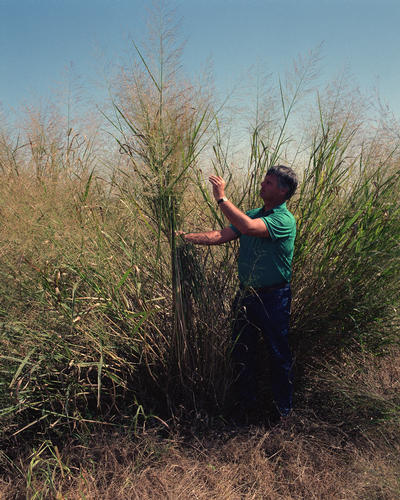
- P. virgatum

Scientific classification
- Kingdom: Plantae
- Clade: Embryophytes
- Clade: Tracheophytes
- Clade: Spermatophytes
- Clade: Angiosperms
- Clade: Monocots
- Clade: Commelinids
- Order: Poales
- Family: Poaceae
- Subfamily: Panicoideae
- Supertribe: Panicodae
- Tribe: Paniceae
- Subtribe: Panicinae
- Genus: Panicum; L.

Synonyms
- Aconisia J.R.Grande; Arthragrostis Lazarides; Chasea Nieuwl.; Eatonia Raf.; Eriolytrum Desv. ex Kunth, not validly publ.; Monachne P.Beauv.; Phanopyrum (Raf.) Nash; Polyneura Peter 1930, illegitimate homonym not Kylin 1924; Psilochloa Launert; Talasium Spreng.; Yakirra Lazarides & R.D.Webster

= Panicum =

Genus of grasses

Panicum, commonly called panicgrass, is a large genus of about 250 species of grasses mostly native to tropical regions.

== Description ==
The flowers are produced in a well-developed panicle often up to 60 cm (24 in) in length with numerous seeds, which are 1–6 mm (0.04–0.24 in) long and 1–2 mm (0.04–0.08 in) broad. The fruits are developed from a two-flowered spikelet. Only the upper floret of each spikelet is fertile; the lower floret is sterile or staminate. Both glumes are present and well developed.

== Taxonomy ==
Phylogenetic studies found the genus as previously circumscribed was polyphyletic, and several species have been reassigned to other genera. Most species in section Stolonifera of subgenus Phanopyrum were transferred to Ocellochloa, while P. venezuelae was placed in the new monotypic genus Drakkaria.

Well-known species include P. miliaceum (proso millet) and P. virgatum (switchgrass).

=== Selected species ===
- Panicum amarum Elliott – bitter panicum (North America)
- Panicum capillare L. – witchgrass, tumbleweed (North America)
- Panicum coloratum L. – kleingrass, coolah grass, Bambatsi panic (Africa)
- Panicum decompositum R.Br. – native millet (Australia)
- Panicum dichotomiflorum Michx. – fall panicgrass (North America)
- Panicum effusum R.Br. – hairy panic (Australia, New Guinea)
- Panicum fauriei Hitchc. – Faurie's panicgrass (endemic to Hawai'i)
- Panicum flexile (Gattinger) Scribn. – wiry panicgrass (eastern North America)
- Panicum hallii Vasey – Hall's panicgrass (North America)
- Panicum havardii Vasey – Havard's panicgrass (North America)
- Panicum hemitomon Schult. – maidencane (Americas)
- Panicum hillmanii Chase – Hillmann's panicgrass (North America)
- Panicum hirticaule J.Presl – Mexican panicgrass (Americas)
- Panicum lycopodioides Bory ex Nees – false club-moss panic grass (Réunion)
- Panicum miliaceum L. – proso millet, common millet (domesticated)
- Panicum niihauense H.St.John – lau 'ehu (endemic to Hawai'i)
- Panicum queenslandicum Domin
- Panicum repens L. – torpedo grass (widely introduced)
- Panicum rigidum Balf.f. (endemic to Socotra)
- Panicum simile Domin – two colour panic (Australia)
- Panicum socotranum Cope (endemic to Socotra)
- Panicum sumatrense Roth – little millet (Asia)
- Panicum turgidum Forssk. – afezu (Africa, Asia)
- Panicum urvilleanum Kunth – desert panicgrass (North America)
- Panicum virgatum L. – switchgrass (North America)

==== Formerly placed here ====
Species formerly classified in genus Panicum include:

- Acostia gracilis, as Panicum acostia R.D.Webster
- Cnidochloa longipedicellata (Swallen) Zuloaga, as Panicum longipedicellatum Swallen
- Coleataenia abscissa (Swallen) LeBlond, as Panicum abscissum Swallen
- Coleataenia anceps (Michx.) Soreng, as Panicum anceps Michx.
- Drakkaria venezuelae (Hack.) C.Silva & Zuloaga, as Panicum venezuelae Hack.
- Echinochloa colona, as Panicum colonum L. – jungle rice
- Echinochloa crus-galli, as Panicum crus-galli L. – barnyard grass
- Hopia obtusa (Kunth) Zuloaga & Morrone, as Panicum obtusum Kunth – vine mesquite grass
- Janochloa antidotalis (Retz.) Zuloaga & Delfini, as Panicum antidotale Retz. – blue panicum
- Megathyrsus maximus (Jacq.) B.K.Simon & S.W.L.Jacobs, as Panicum maximum Jacq. – Guinea grass or buffalo grass
- Stolonochloa pygmaea (R.Br.) E.J.Thomps., as Panicum pygmaeum R.Br. – Australian native dwarf panicum or rainforest panicum
- Urochloa panicoides, as Panicum helopus Trin. – annual signal grass

== Distribution ==
The genus is native throughout the tropical regions of the world, with a few species extending into the northern temperate zone. They are often large, annual or perennial grasses, growing to 1–3 m (3–10 ft) tall.

Australia has 29 native and 9 introduced species of Panicum.

== Gallery ==
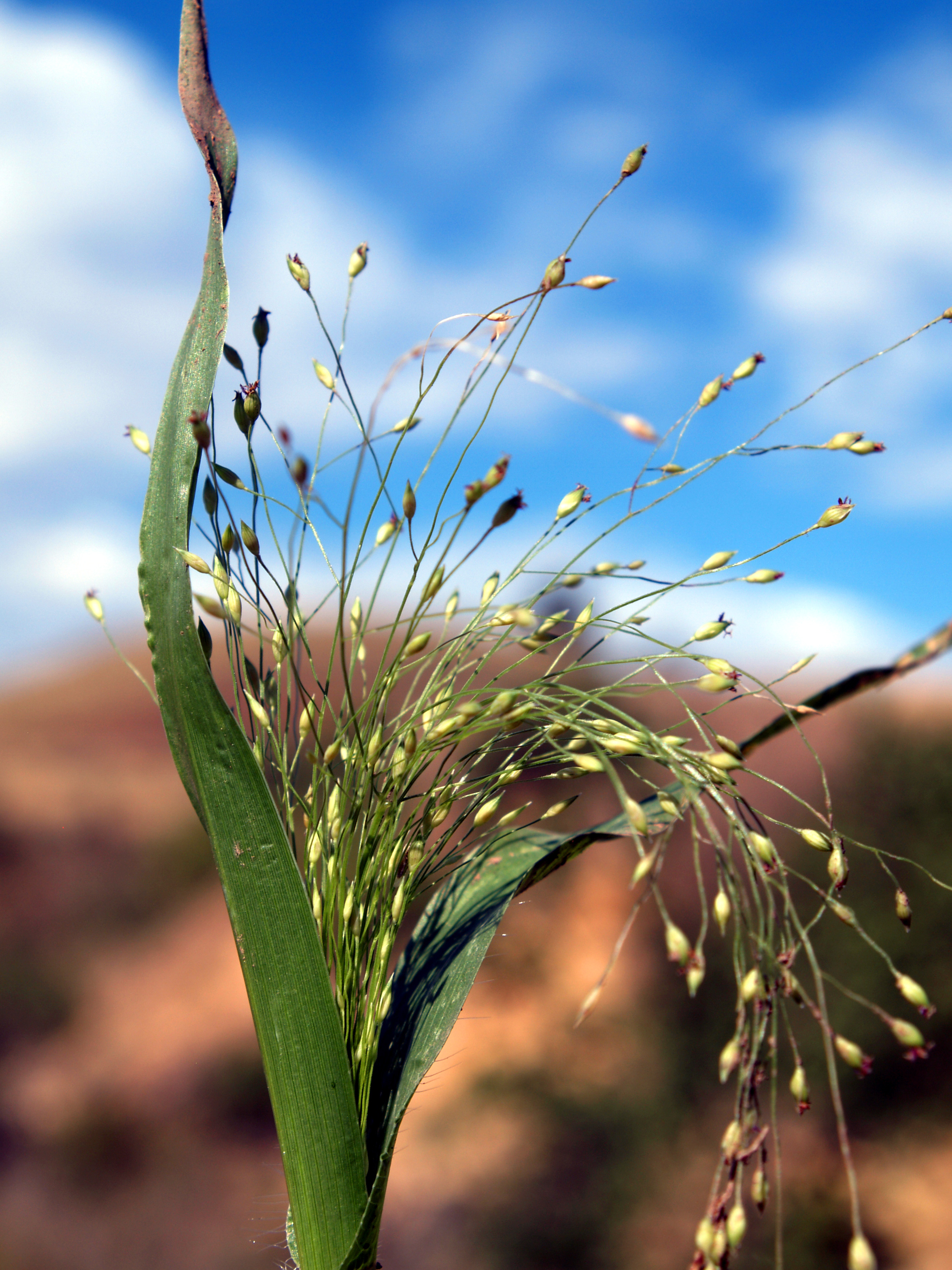
P. capillare

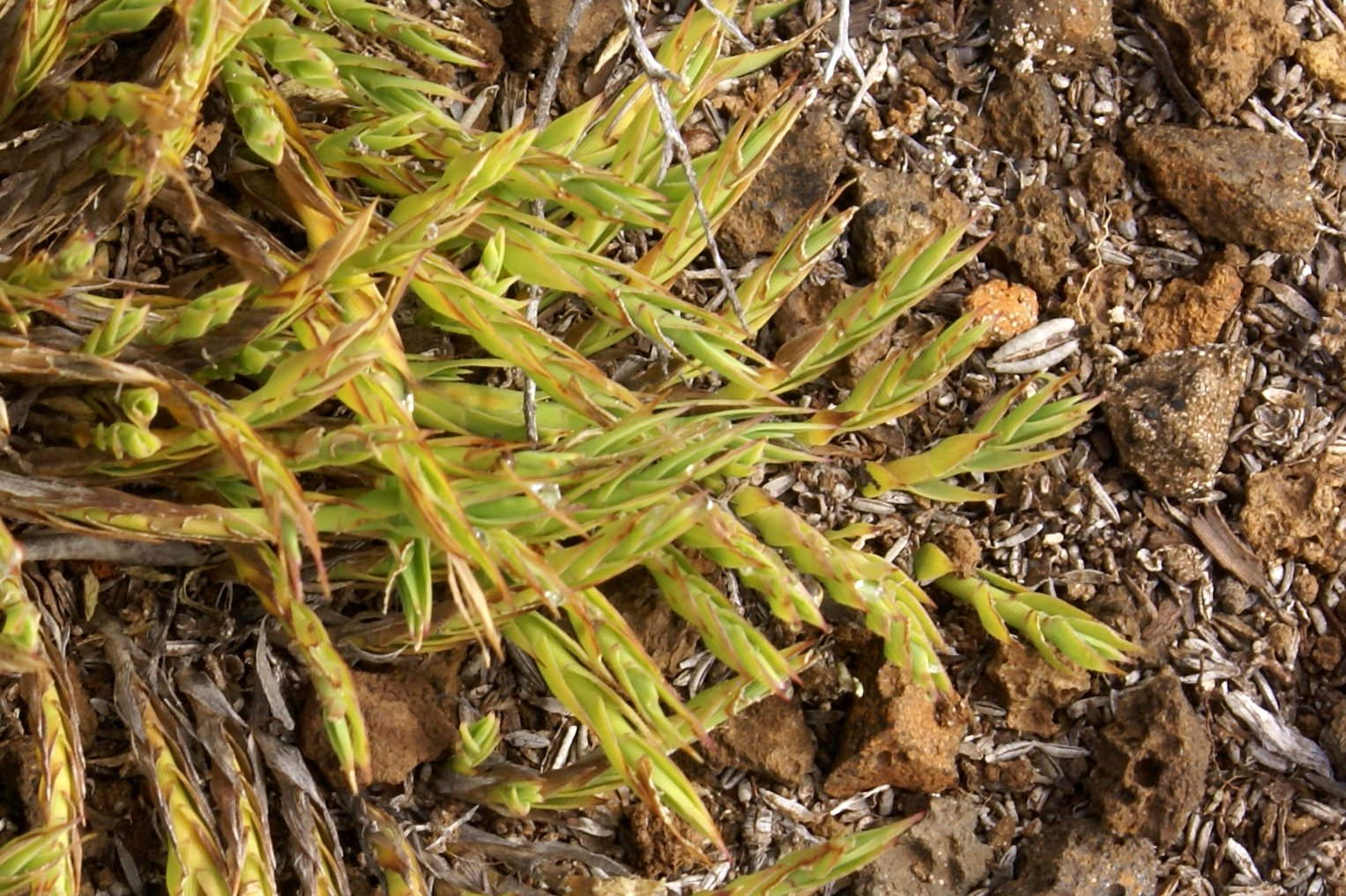
P. lycopodioides

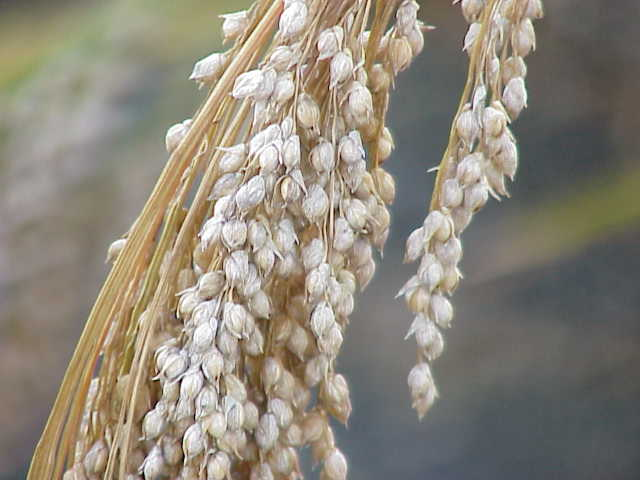
P. miliaceum (Proso)

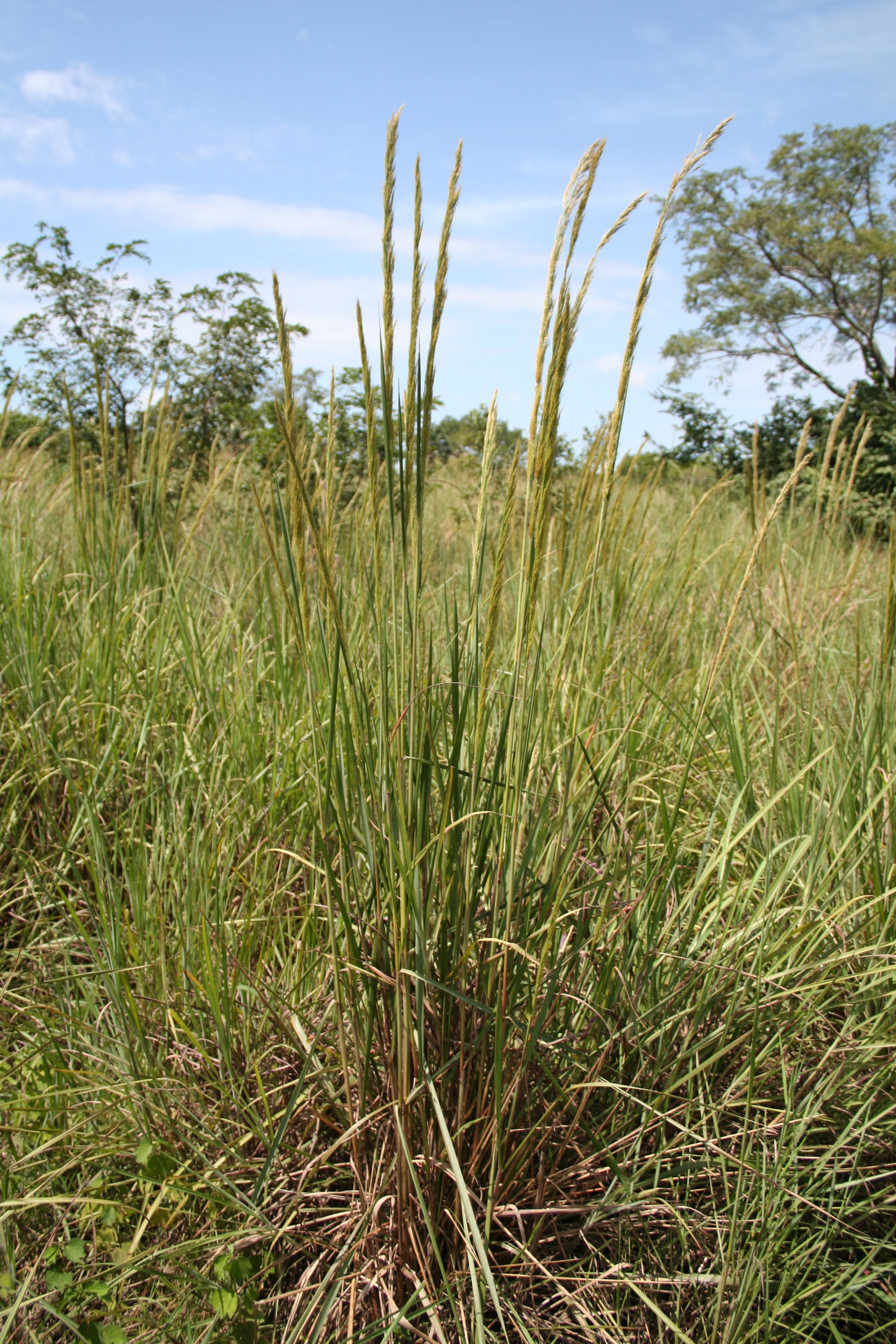
P. phragmitoides

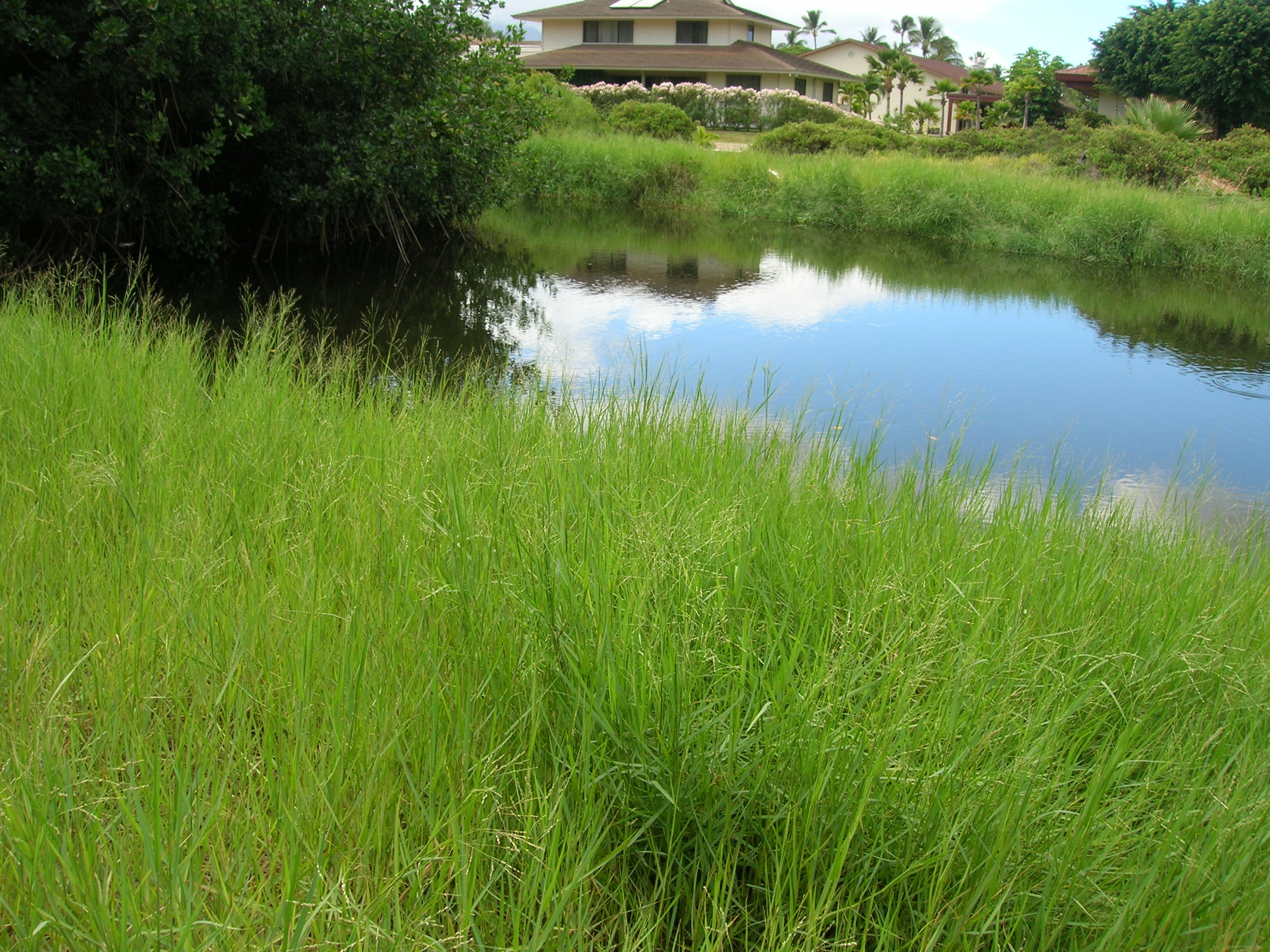
P. repens

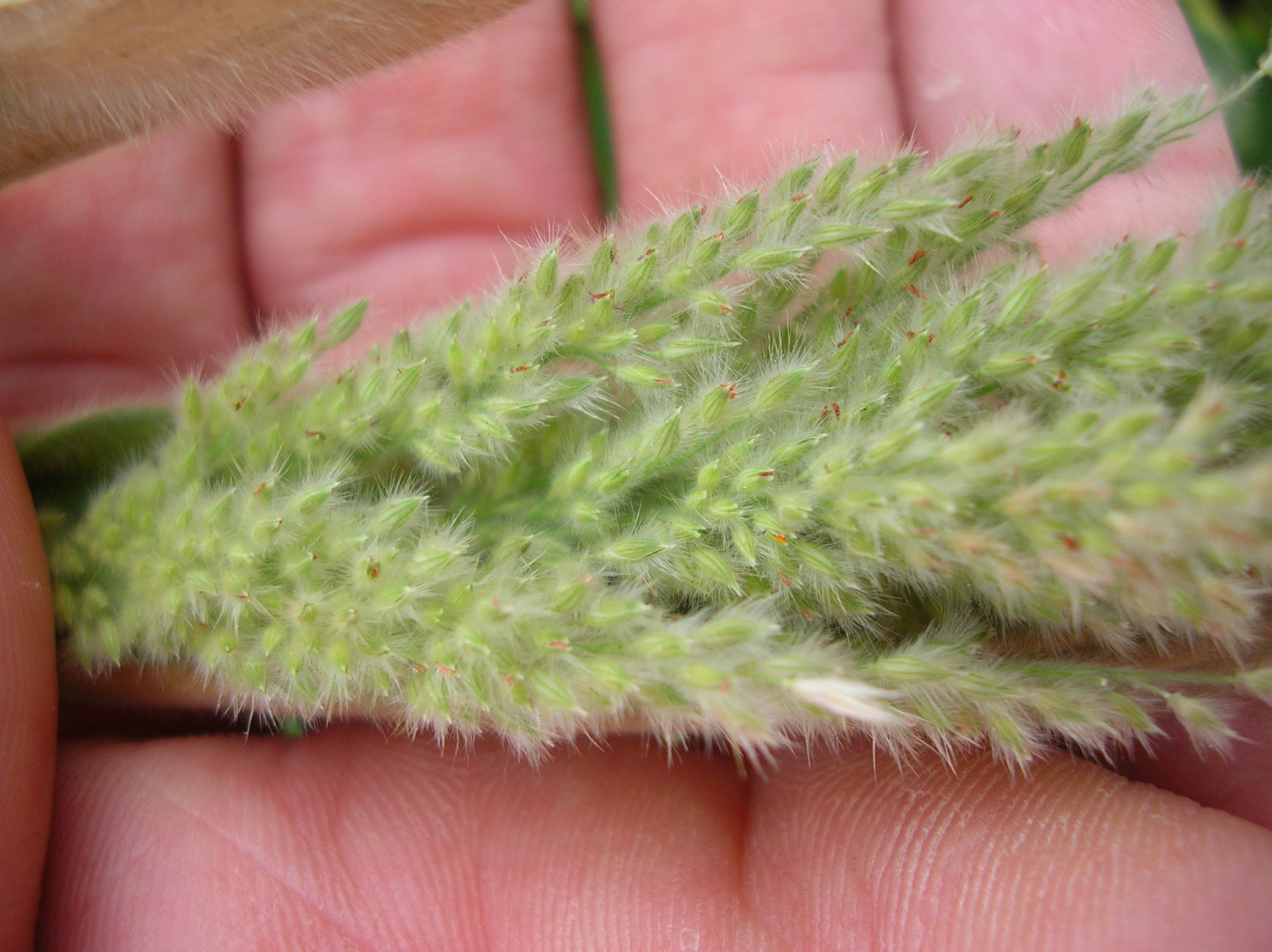
P. torridum

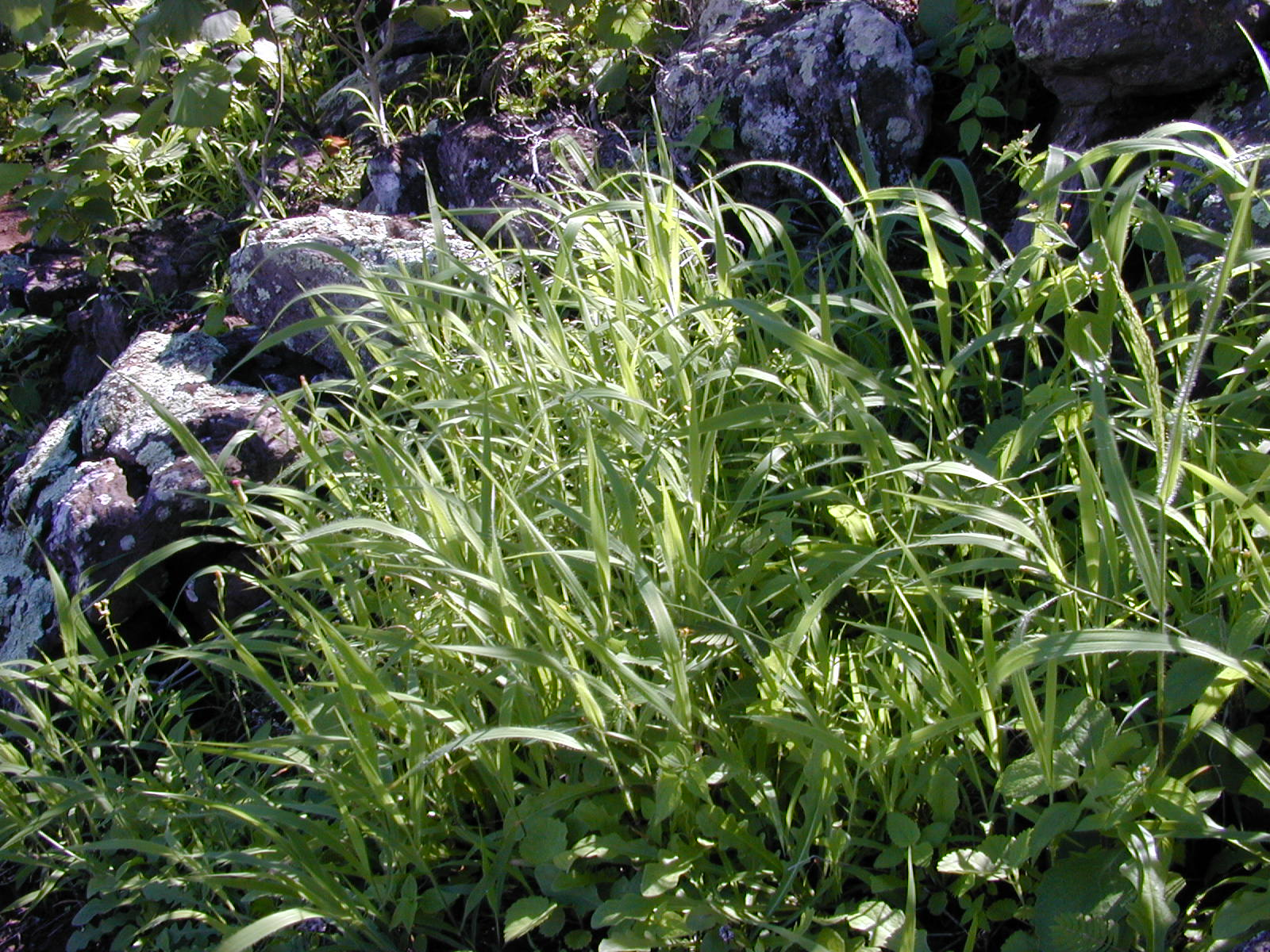
P. xerophyllum

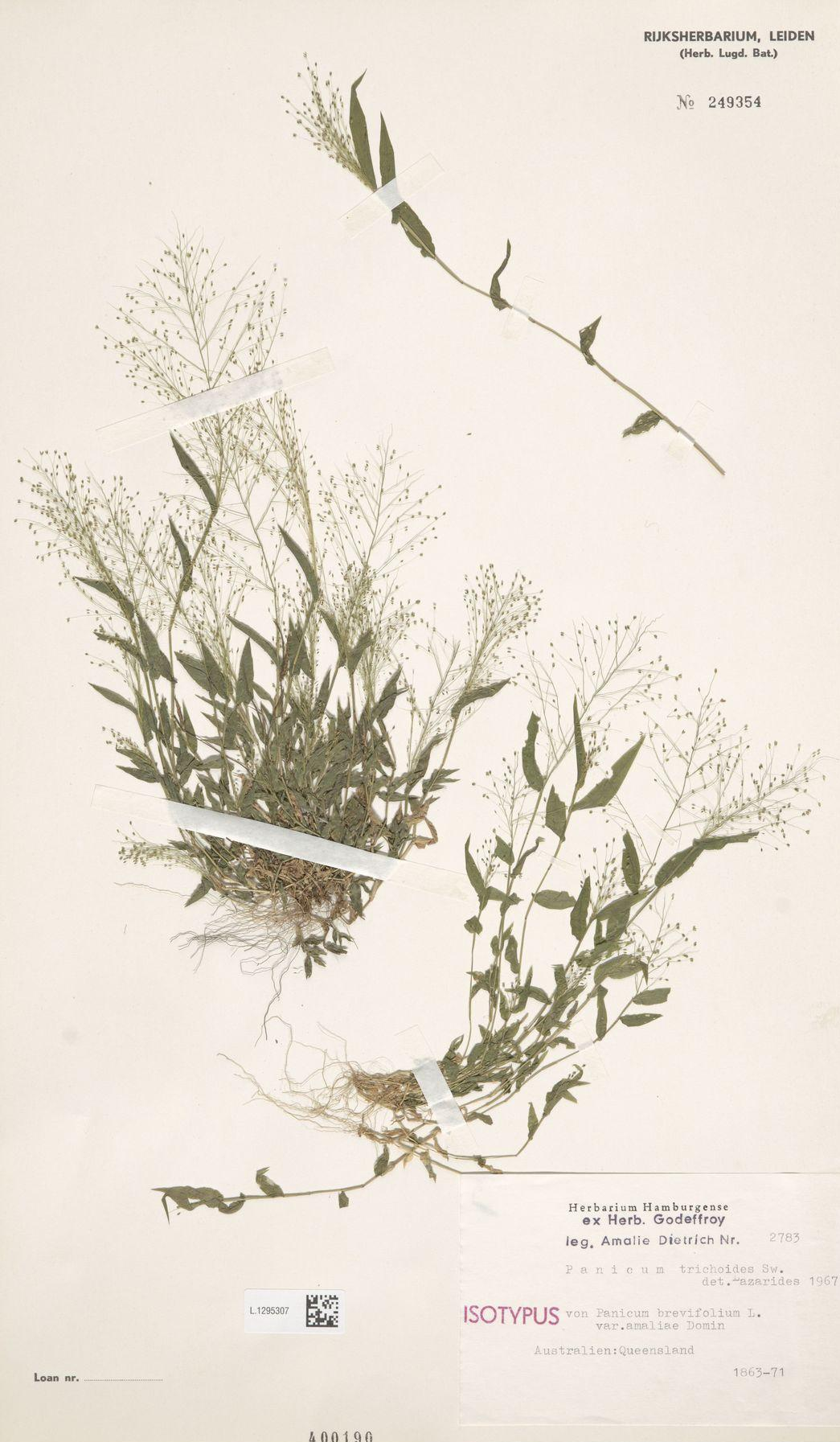
P. trichoides
