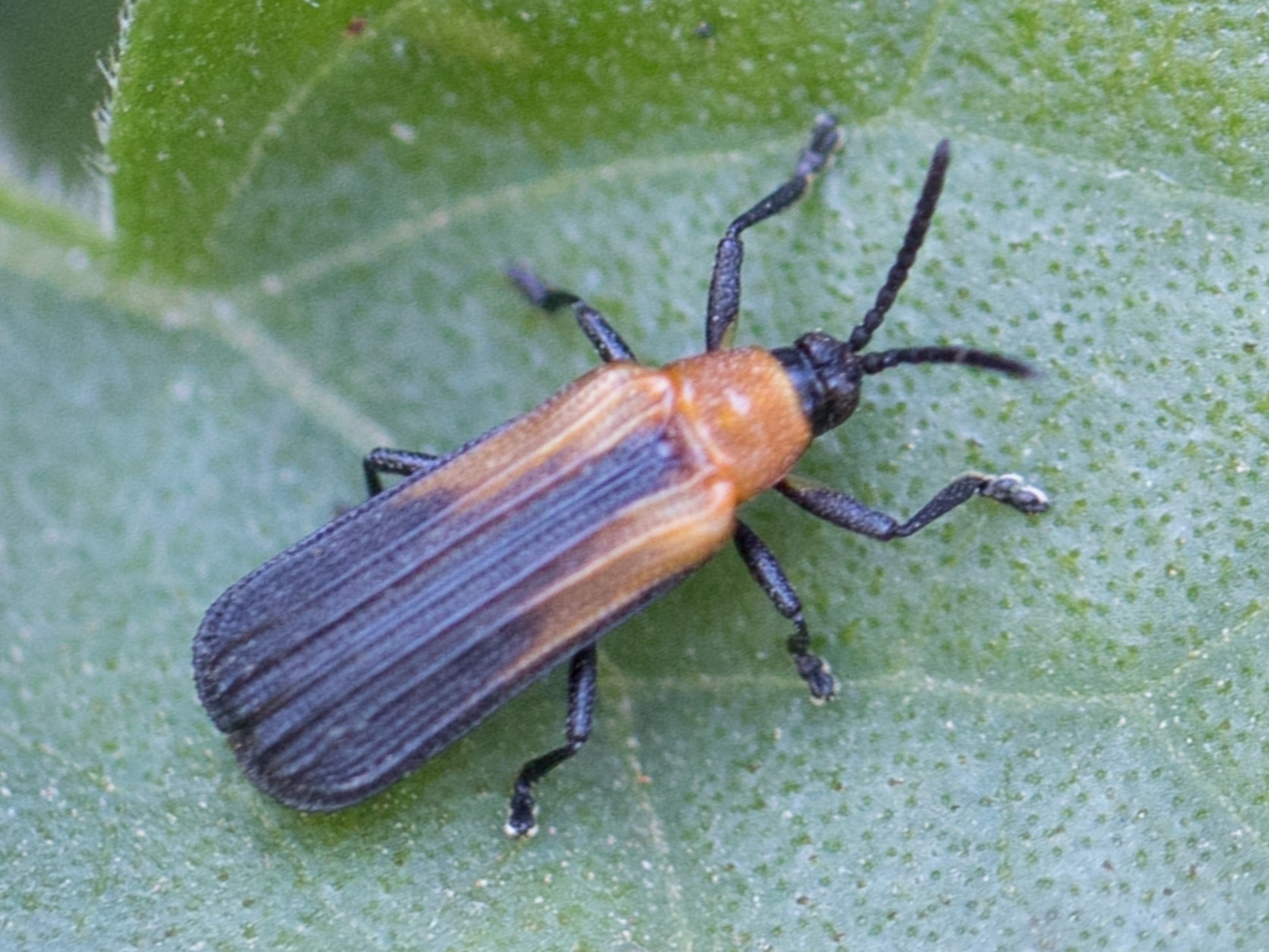

Scientific classification
- Kingdom: Animalia
- Phylum: Arthropoda
- Clade: Pancrustacea
- Class: Insecta
- Order: Coleoptera
- Suborder: Polyphaga
- Infraorder: Cucujiformia
- Family: Chrysomelidae
- Genus: Temnochalepus
- Species: T. insolitus

Binomial name
- Temnochalepus insolitus Uhmann, 1935

Synonyms
- Temnochalepus insolitus binotata Uhmann, 1959

= Temnochalepus insolitus =

Species of beetle

Temnochalepus insolitus is a species of beetle of the family Chrysomelidae. It is found in Argentina, Bolivia, Brazil (Matto Grosso, Paraná, Rio Grande do Sul, São Paulo), and Paraguay.

== Biology ==
The recorded food plants are Panicum and Pharus species.
