= Gene density =

Ratio of number of genes per number of base pairs

In genetics, the gene density of an organism's genome is the ratio of the number of genes per number of base pairs, usually written in terms of a million base pairs, or megabase (Mb). The human genome has a gene density of 11-15 genes/Mb, while the genome of the C. elegans roundworm is estimated to have 200.

Seemingly simple organisms, such as bacteria and amoebas, have a much higher gene density than humans. Bacterial DNA has a gene density on the order of 500-1000 genes/Mb. This is due several factors, including that the fact that bacterial DNA has no introns. There are also fewer codons in bacterial genes.

== Species ==
=== Protozoa ===
species	number of genes	base pairs in genome (Mb)	gene density
Babesia microti	3,685	6.4	575.8
Besnoitia besnoiti	8,546	58.8	145.3
Cryptosporidium parvum	3,887	9.1	427.1
Giardia intestinalis	5,388	11.5	468.5
Leishmania donovani	8,123	32.4	250.7
Plasmodium falciparum	5,683	23.5	241.8
Phytophthora infestans	19,344	203.2	95.2
Tetrahymena thermophila	26,996	130.4	207
Theileria parva	4,141	8.3	498.9
Toxoplasma gondii	8,925	64.5	138.4
Trypanosoma cruzi	25,183	32.5	774.9

=== Fungi ===
species	number of genes	base pairs in genome (Mb)	gene density
Agaricus bisporus	11,459	30.7	373.3
Aspergillus nidulans	9,586	30.6	313.3
Aspergillus niger	10,828	35.6	304.2
Candida albicans	6,263	14.7	426.1
Cryptococcus neoformans	7,004	18.6	376.5
Debaryomyces hansenii	6,495	12.1	536.8
Encephalitozoon cuniculi	2,029	2.3	882.2
Eremothecium gossypii	5,356	9.1	588.6
Fusarium oxysporum	21,354	52.4	407.5
Kluyveromyces lactis	5,335	10.6	503.3
Lasiodiplodia theobromae	13,054	43.6	299.4
Neurospora crassa	10,590	41.3	256.4
Saccharomyces cerevisiae	6,445	11.9	541.6
Saccharomyces paradoxus	5,840	12	486.6
Schizosaccharomyces pombe	6,974	12.8	544.8
Talaromyces marneffei	10,138	28.3	358.2
Tremella mesenterica	8,292	27.9	297.2
Trichoderma harzianum	14,294	40.7	351.2
Trichophyton rubrum	8,804	23.1	381.1
Ustilago maydis	6,909	19.9	347.2
Wallemia ichthyophaga	5,000	9.5	526.3
Yarrowia lipolytica	7,144	20.3	351.9

=== Plants ===
species	common name	number of genes	base pairs in genome (Mb)	gene density
Ananas comosus	pineapple	25,758	382	67.4
Arabidopsis thaliana	thale cress	38,311	119	321.9
Asparagus officinalis	asparagus	32,237	1,187	27.2
Brassica rapa	field mustard	51,592	333	154.9
Cannabis sativa	cannabis	31,170	876	35.6
Cajanus cajan	pigeon pea	33,495	593	56.5
Capsicum annuum	pepper	41,729	2,909	14.3
Coffea arabica	coffee	56,902	1,094	52
Glycine max	soybean	59,905	995.7	60.2
Juglans regia	English walnut	37,996	634.7	59.9
Nicotiana tabacum	tobacco	74,273	3,734.2	19.9
Olea europaea	olive	47,911	1,316.7	36.4
Oryza sativa	rice	35,223	385	91.5
Panicum hallii	grass	31,528	511.6	61.6
Physcomitrium patens	spreading earthmoss	23,747	472	50.3
Prunus dulcis	almond	26,936	236.9	113.7
Prunus persica	peach	26,412	214.2	123.3
Punica granatum	pomegrante	29,281	308.4	94.9
Rosa chinensis	rose	40,349	513.9	78.5
Solanum lycopersicum	tomato	31,263	813	38.5
Solanum tuberosum	potato	33,606	760	44.2
Theobroma cacao	cocoa	24,957	335	74.5
Zea mays	corn	49,796	2,197	22.7

=== Invertebrate ===
invertebrate species
species	common name	number of genes	base pairs in genome (Mb)	gene density
Aedes aegypti	yellow fever mosquito	19,623	1,274	15.4
Anopheles gambiae	African malaria mosquito	13,247	250	53
Apis mellifera	honey bee	12,374	226	54.8
Caenorhabditis elegans	C. elegans	47,632	102	467
Daphnia magna	water flea	21,549	126	171
Drosophila melanogaster	fruit fly	17,868	137	130.4
Hydra vulgaris	hydra	22,980	1,055	21.8
Limulus polyphemus	horseshoe crab	27,318	1,828	14.9
Octopus sinensis	octopus	29,784	2,719	11
Pediculus humanus	human louse	10,993	110	99.9
Strongylocentrotus purpuratus	purple sea urchin	33,504	921	36.4

=== Vertebrate non-mammals ===
species	common name	number of genes	base pairs in genome (Mb)	gene density
Alligator mississippiensis	American alligator	25,279	2,161	11.7
Anolis carolinensis	anole lizard	22,293	1,799	12.4
Astyanax mexicanus	Mexican tetra	31,695	1,263	25.1
Columba livia	pigeon	26,679	1,063	25.1
Danio rerio	zebrafish	47,350	1,408	33.6
Gallus gallus	chicken	24,402	1,043	23.4
Nothobranchius furzeri	turquoise killifish	25,387	1,052	24.1
Oryzias latipes	Japanese rice fish	26,846	746	36
Petromyzon marinus	sea lamprey	22,167	987	22.5
Taeniopygia guttata	zebra finch	21,543	1,069	20.2
Takifugu rubripes	Japanese puffer	27,413	384	71.8
Xenopus tropicalis	tropical clawed frog	28,863	1,468	19.7
Xenopus laevis	African clawed frog	37,283	2,718	13.7

=== Vertebrate mammals ===
species	common name	number of genes	base pairs in genome (Mb)	gene density
Acinonyx jubatus	cheetah	34,482	2,378	14.5
Ailuropoda melanoleuca	giant panda	32,950	2,371	13.9
Aotus nancymaae	night monkey	31,331	2,861	11
Artibeus jamaicensis	Jamaican fruit-eating bat	31,480	2,316	13.6
Arvicanthis niloticus	African grass rat	31,912	2,496	12.8
Balaenoptera acutorostrata	minke whale	26,805	2,431	11
Balaenoptera musculus	blue whale	27,194	2,105	12.9
Bison bison	American bison	27,488	2,828	9.7
Bos mutus	wild yak	26,159	2,703	9.7
Bos taurus	cattle	35,061	2,715	12.9
Canis lupus familiaris	dog	36,717	2,370	15.5
Chinchilla lanigera	long-tailed chinchilla	30,378	2,390	12.7
Felis catus	cat	35,521	2,521	14
Gorilla gorilla	gorilla	35,419	3,063	11.6
Homo sapiens	human	44,507	2,861	15.5
Macaca mulatta	Rhesus monkey	40,164	2,970	13.5
Mus musculus	house mouse	42,823	2,689	15.9
Pan troglodytes	chimpanzee	40,769	3,050	13.4
Rattus norvegicus	brown rat	38,371	2,743	14
Sus scrofa	pig	30,345	2,459	12.3

Gene count is calculated by the number of gene flags in the latest version of a given species gtf annotation file. Bear in mind that well studied organisms will probably have higher gene counts because these species have better annotation, therefore these numbers are estimates for comparison.

== See also ==
- C-value enigma
