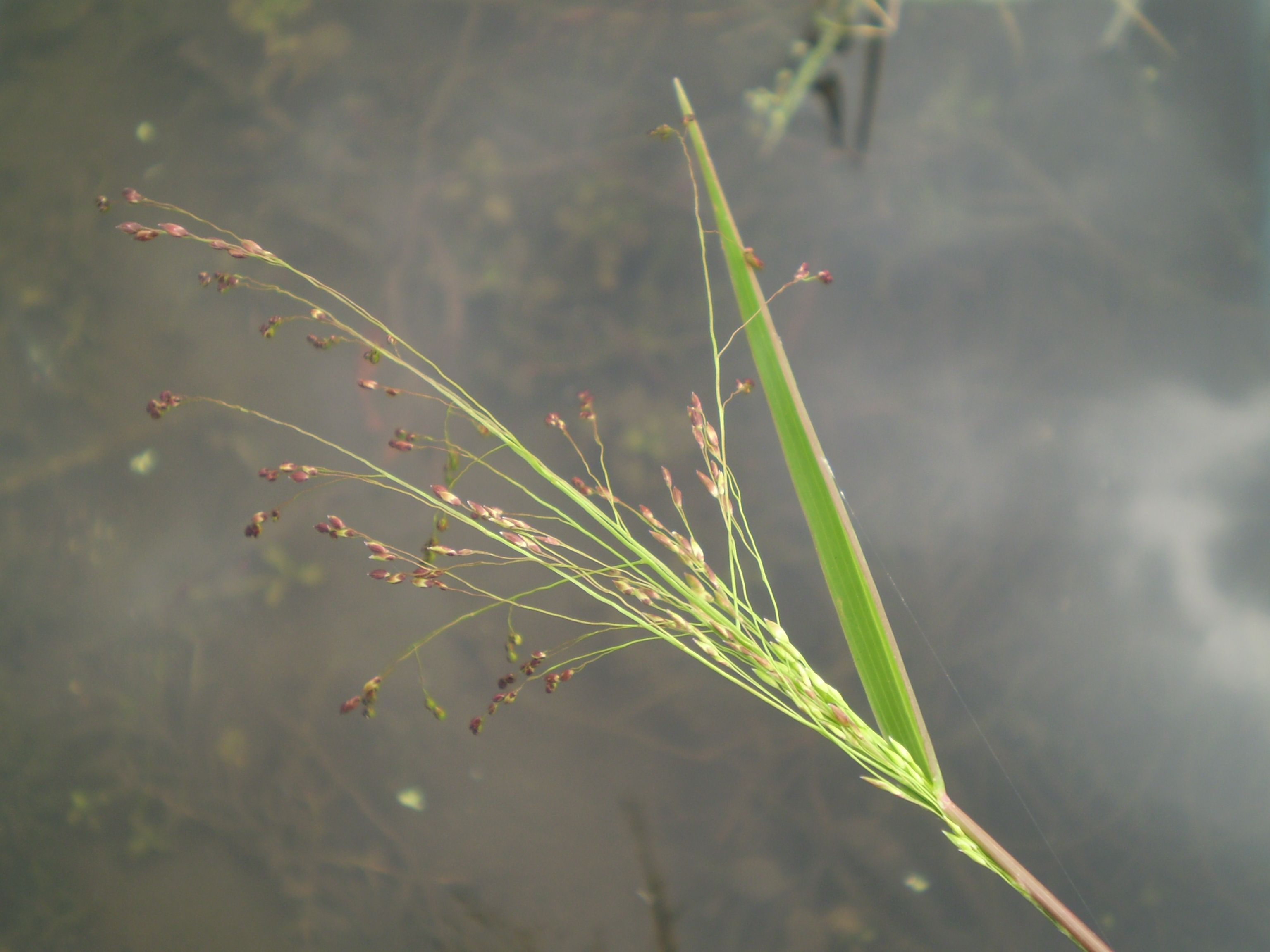

Scientific classification
- Kingdom: Plantae
- Clade: Tracheophytes
- Clade: Angiosperms
- Clade: Monocots
- Clade: Commelinids
- Order: Poales
- Family: Poaceae
- Subfamily: Panicoideae
- Genus: Panicum
- Species: P. dichotomiflorum

Binomial name
- Panicum dichotomiflorum Michx.

= Panicum dichotomiflorum =

Species of grass

Panicum dichotomiflorum, known by the common names fall panicgrass, autumn millet (Britain and Ireland), and fall panicum is a species of Poaceae "true grass". It is native to much of the eastern United States and parts of Canada, and it can be found in the Western United States through California. It may be an introduced species in some western climates.

== Description ==
Panicum dichotomiflorum is an annual grass growing decumbent or erect to a maximum height near one meter-3 feet. It can be distinguished from its relative, Panicum capillare - Witchgrass by its hairless leaves. The inflorescence is a large open panicle up to 20 centimeters long and fanning out to a width of 16 centimeters.

== Ecology ==
=== Habitat ===
P. dichotomiflorum can be found in moist habitats including floodplain, streams, disturbed areas and chaparral habitats. It requires full sun.

=== Phenology ===
This species flowers from mid-summer through the fall.
