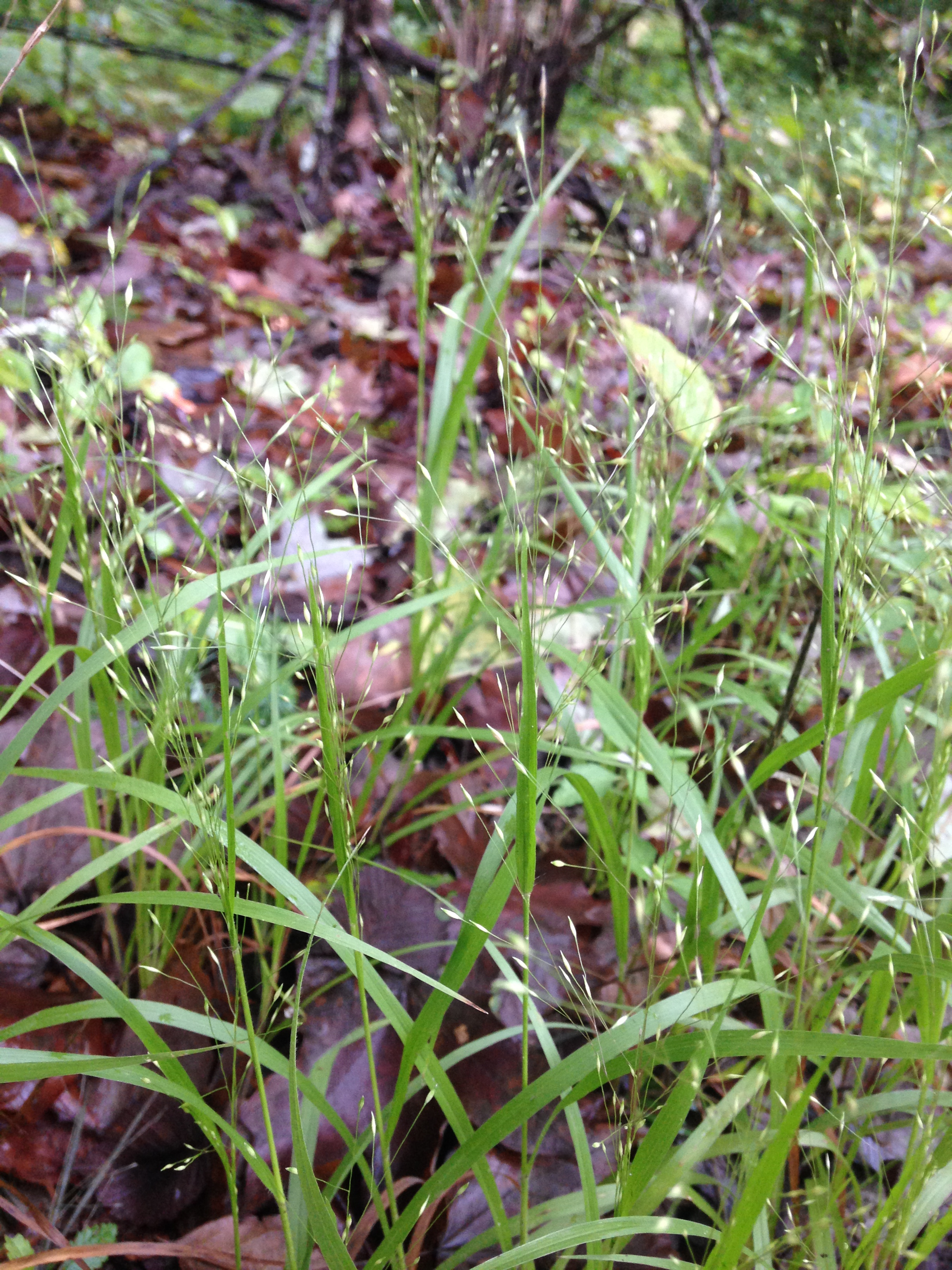

Scientific classification
- Kingdom: Plantae
- Clade: Tracheophytes
- Clade: Angiosperms
- Clade: Monocots
- Clade: Commelinids
- Order: Poales
- Family: Poaceae
- Subfamily: Panicoideae
- Genus: Panicum
- Species: P. flexile

Binomial name
- Panicum flexile (Gattinger) Scribn.

= Panicum flexile =

Species of grass

Panicum flexile, commonly called wiry panicgrass, is a species of flowering plant in the grass family (Poaceae). It is primarily native to eastern to North America, where it has a scattered and localized distribution. It is typically found in mafic or calcareous open areas, both wet and dry, particularly associated with limestone.

Panicum flexile is a rather delicate annual grass. It can be distinguished from similar-looking Panicum by its long-acuminate spikelets arranged in a slender, elongated panicle.
