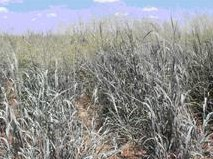

Conservation status
- Apparently Secure (NatureServe)

Scientific classification
- Kingdom: Plantae
- Clade: Tracheophytes
- Clade: Angiosperms
- Clade: Monocots
- Clade: Commelinids
- Order: Poales
- Family: Poaceae
- Subfamily: Panicoideae
- Genus: Panicum
- Species: P. havardii

Binomial name
- Panicum havardii Vasey

= Panicum havardii =

Species of flowering plant

Panicum havardii is a species of grass known by the common name Havard's panicgrass. It is native to North America, where it occurs in northern Mexico and Texas and New Mexico in the United States.

This species is a rhizomatous perennial grass with stems up to 63 inches long with an open panicle up to 15 inches long and wide. It grows on sand dunes and in arroyos, where it helps to stabilize areas of open sand. It helps prevent erosion. It provides a forage for cattle when it is young but it is otherwise unpalatable for animals.
