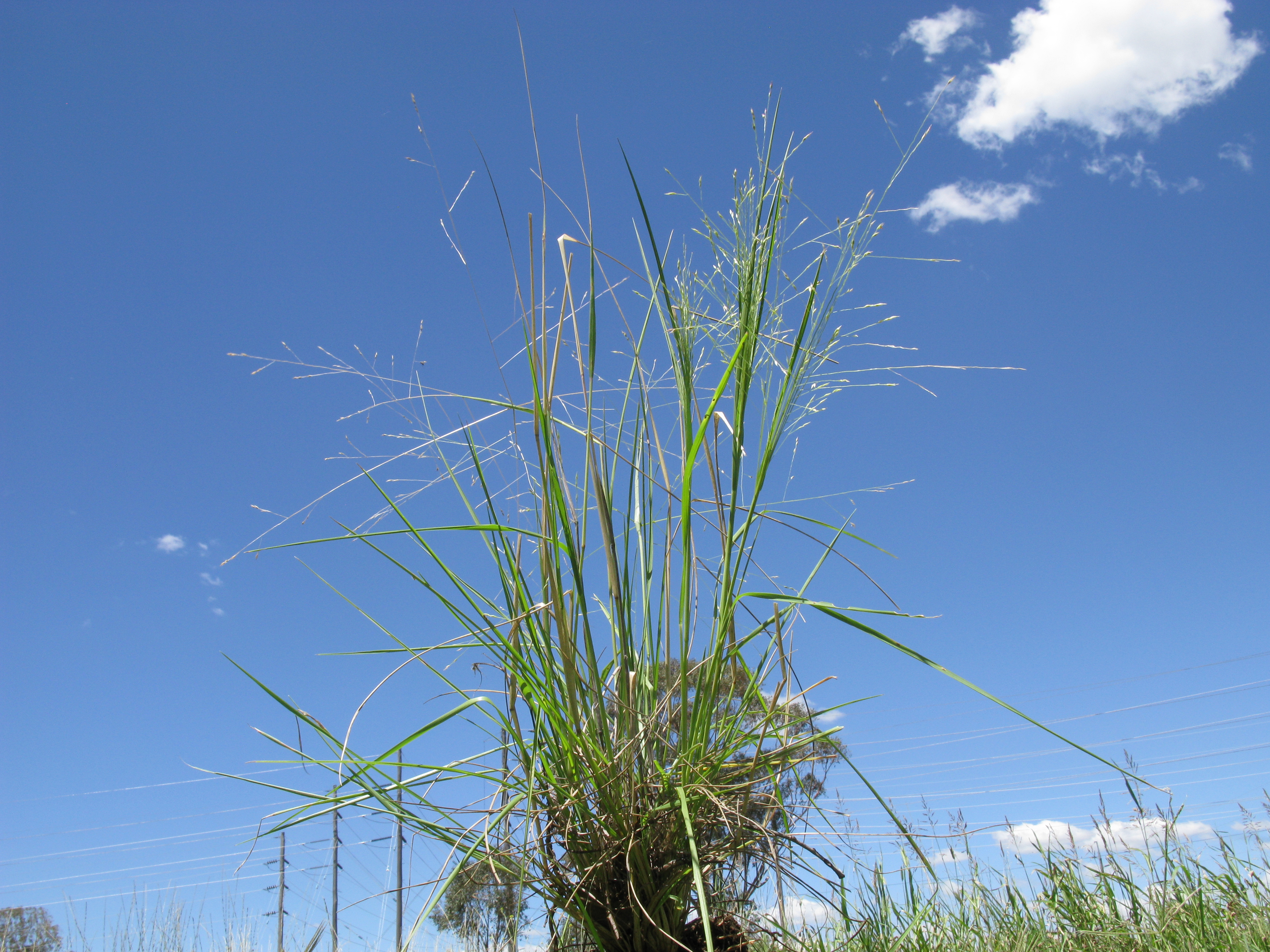

Scientific classification
- Kingdom: Plantae
- Clade: Tracheophytes
- Clade: Angiosperms
- Clade: Monocots
- Clade: Commelinids
- Order: Poales
- Family: Poaceae
- Subfamily: Panicoideae
- Genus: Panicum
- Species: P. queenslandicum

Binomial name
- Panicum queenslandicum Domin

Synonyms
- Panicum benthamii Domin, nom. illeg.; Panicum shirleyanum Domin; Panicum queenslandicum var. acuminatum Vickery

= Panicum queenslandicum =

Species of plant

Panicum queenslandicum a species of monocotyledon described by Karel Domin. Panicum queenslandicum belongs to the genus Panicum, and the family Poaceae. No subspecies are listed. The species is native to the Maluku Islands, New Guinea and the Australian states of New South Wales, Queensland and Victoria.

== Description ==
P. queenslandicum is a perennial grass that grows densely in clusters/tufts, reaching heights of up to 0.8 m high.
