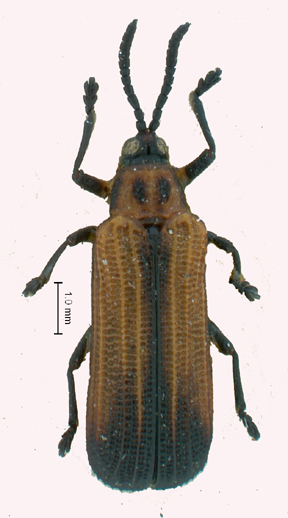

Scientific classification
- Kingdom: Animalia
- Phylum: Arthropoda
- Clade: Pancrustacea
- Class: Insecta
- Order: Coleoptera
- Suborder: Polyphaga
- Infraorder: Cucujiformia
- Family: Chrysomelidae
- Genus: Temnochalepus
- Species: T. lugubris

Binomial name
- Temnochalepus lugubris (Chapuis, 1877)

Synonyms
- Odontota lugubris Chapuis, 1877; Temnochalepus lugubris binotata Uhmann, 1951

= Temnochalepus lugubris =

Species of beetle

Temnochalepus lugubris is a species of beetle of the family Chrysomelidae. It is found in Argentina, Brazil (Amazonas, Bahia, Goiás, Pernambuco, Rio de Janeiro, Santa Catarina, São Paulo) and Paraguay.

== Biology ==
The recorded food plants are Commelina species.
