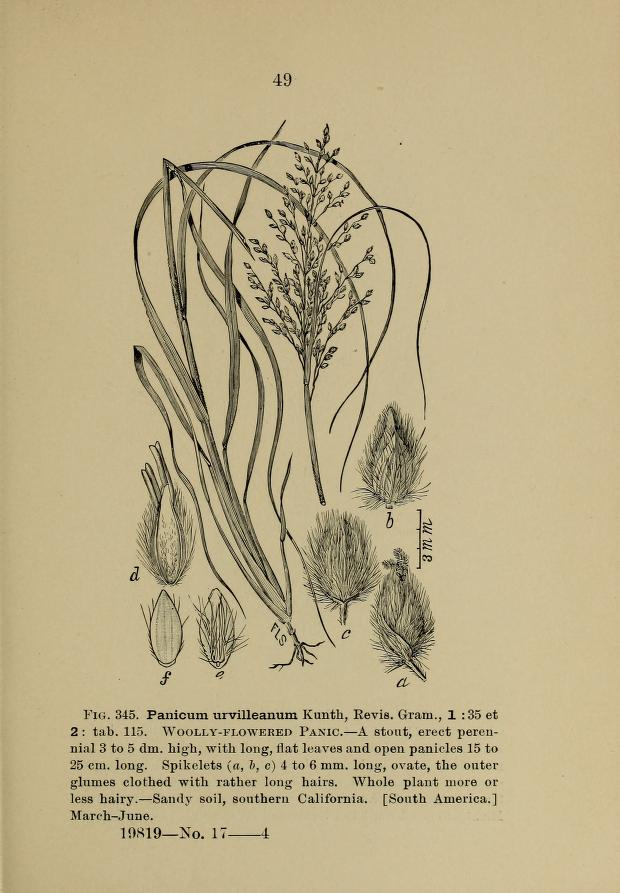

Scientific classification
- Kingdom: Plantae
- Clade: Tracheophytes
- Clade: Angiosperms
- Clade: Monocots
- Clade: Commelinids
- Order: Poales
- Family: Poaceae
- Subfamily: Panicoideae
- Genus: Panicum
- Species: P. urvilleanum

Binomial name
- Panicum urvilleanum J.Presl

= Panicum urvilleanum =

Species of flowering plant

Panicum urvilleanum is a species of grass known by the common names desert panicgrass and silky panicgrass. It is native to the southwestern United States and northern Mexico, where it grows in sandy habitat, including the dunes of the deserts. It is also known in parts of South America.

This is a stoloniferous perennial grass growing up to a meter tall with hairy leaves up to 45 centimeters long. The inflorescence is a branching, spreading panicle up to 35 centimeters long bearing oval-shaped spikelets coated in downy white or silvery hairs.
