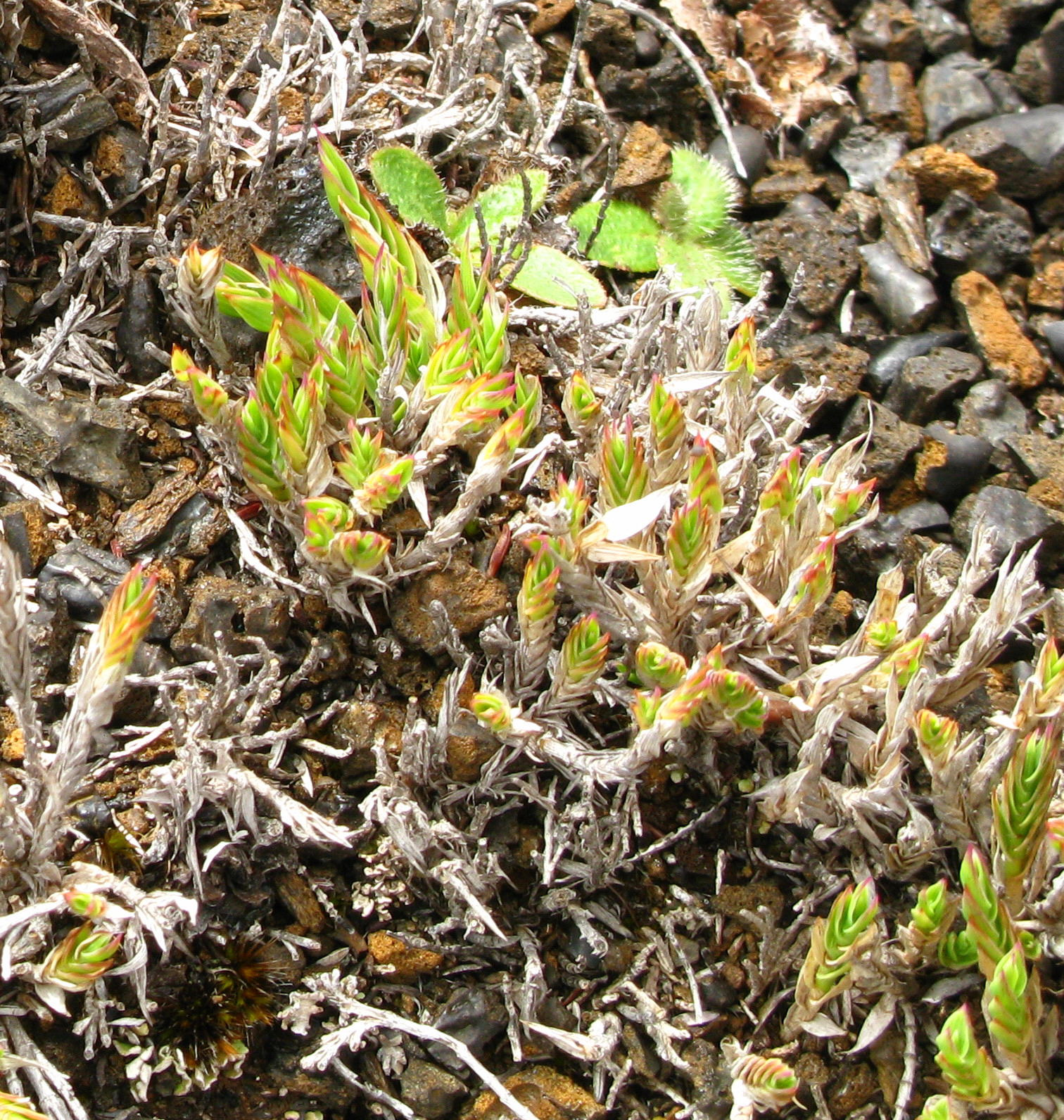

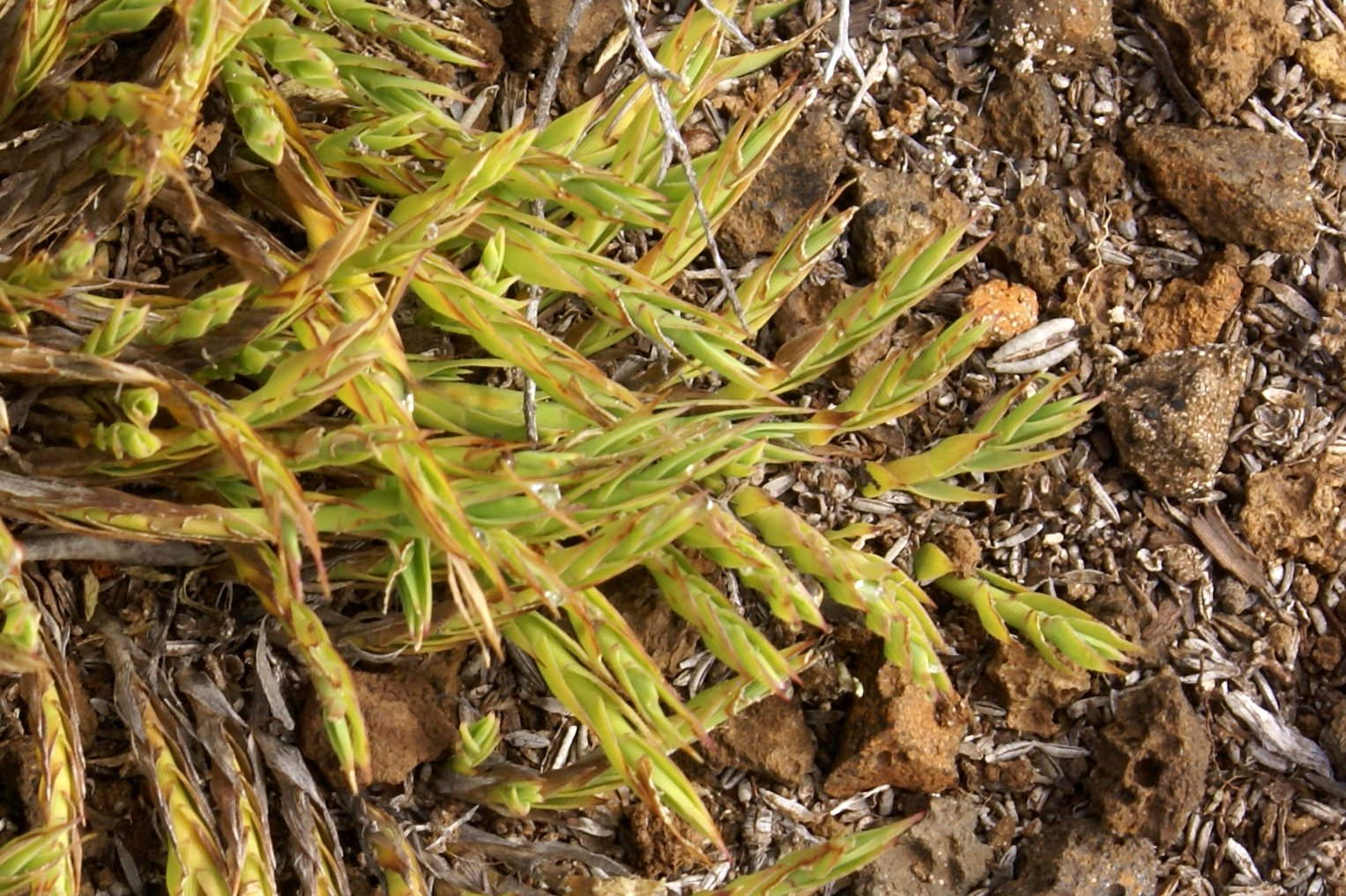

Scientific classification
- Kingdom: Plantae
- Clade: Tracheophytes
- Clade: Angiosperms
- Clade: Monocots
- Clade: Commelinids
- Order: Poales
- Family: Poaceae
- Subfamily: Panicoideae
- Genus: Panicum
- Species: P. lycopodioides

Binomial name
- Panicum lycopodioides Bory ex Nees

= Panicum lycopodioides =

Species of grass

Panicum lycopodioides, common name false club-moss panic grass or (in French) panic faux-lycopode, is endemic to the French island of Réunion in the Indian Ocean. It is found at high altitudes on the island, at elevations over 2000 m (6700 feet). The highest point on the island is Piton des Neiges, 3069 m (10,230 feet). The plant requires full sun-light and a cold climate.

The specific epithet "lycopodioides" means "similar to Lycopodium" in reference to the plant's general habitus superficially resembling certain species of club-moss. Stems grow horizontally, branching frequently, thus forming mats pressed against the ground. Leaves are small, pressed against the stem like the scales of Lycopodium.
