= Panicum socotranum =

Conservation status
- Critically Endangered (IUCN 3.1)

Scientific classification
- Kingdom: Plantae
- Clade: Tracheophytes
- Clade: Angiosperms
- Clade: Monocots
- Clade: Commelinids
- Order: Poales
- Family: Poaceae
- Subfamily: Panicoideae
- Genus: Panicum
- Species: P. socotranum

Binomial name
- Panicum socotranum Cope (1984)

Species of grass

Panicum socotranum is a species of grass in the family Poaceae. It is a perennial endemic to Socotra island off the coast of East Africa, politically in Yemen. It is known from a single location, on damp ground in an open forest glade at 90 metres elevation.
