= Temnochalepus circumcinctus =

Scientific classification
- Kingdom: Animalia
- Phylum: Arthropoda
- Class: Insecta
- Order: Coleoptera
- Suborder: Polyphaga
- Infraorder: Cucujiformia
- Family: Chrysomelidae
- Genus: Temnochalepus
- Species: T. circumcinctus

Binomial name
- Temnochalepus circumcinctus (Weise, 1910)

Synonyms
- Chalepus circumcinctus Weise, 1910

Species of beetle

Temnochalepus circumcinctus is a species of beetle of the family Chrysomelidae. It is found in Ecuador.

== Biology ==
The food plant is unknown.
