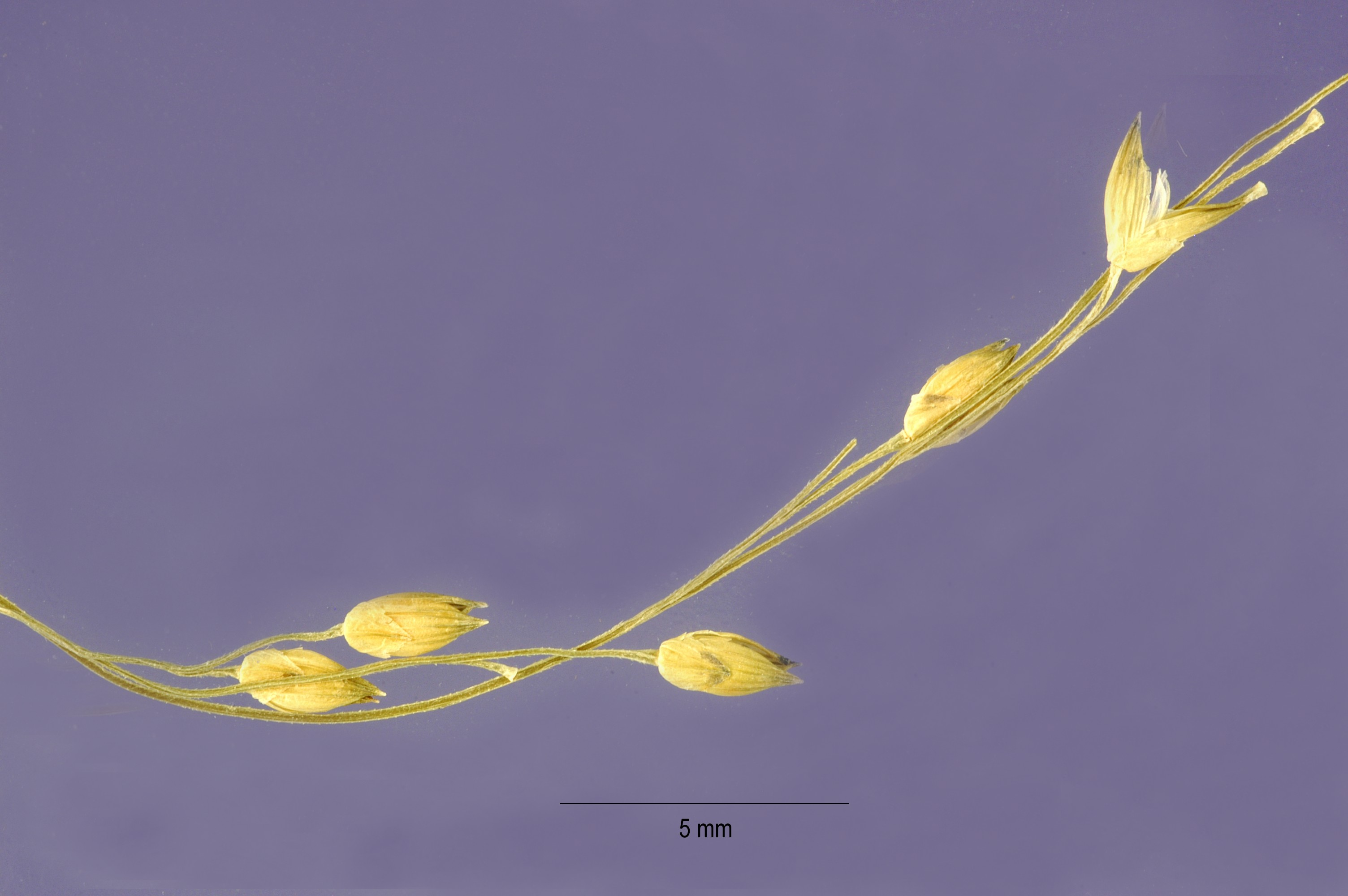

Conservation status
- Secure (NatureServe)

Scientific classification
- Kingdom: Plantae
- Clade: Tracheophytes
- Clade: Angiosperms
- Clade: Monocots
- Clade: Commelinids
- Order: Poales
- Family: Poaceae
- Subfamily: Panicoideae
- Genus: Panicum
- Species: P. hirticaule

Binomial name
- Panicum hirticaule J.Presl

Synonyms
- Panicum sonorum

= Panicum hirticaule =

Species of flowering plant

Panicum hirticaule is a species of grass known by the common names Mexican panicgrass and roughstalked witchgrass. It is also known as the Sonoran millet, and is cultivated as a cereal crop in the American Southwest.

== Distribution ==
In North America it is native to the Southwestern United States and Mexico. Its distribution extends throughout Central and South America. It grows in many types of habitat, including disturbed areas. There is evidence that it was eaten, cultivated and possibly domesticated by Native Americans.

== Description ==
This is an annual bunchgrass growing 10 to 80 centimeters tall and bearing hairy leaves up to 15 centimeters long. The inflorescence is a branching panicle up to 12 centimeters long with rounded spikelets at nodes.
