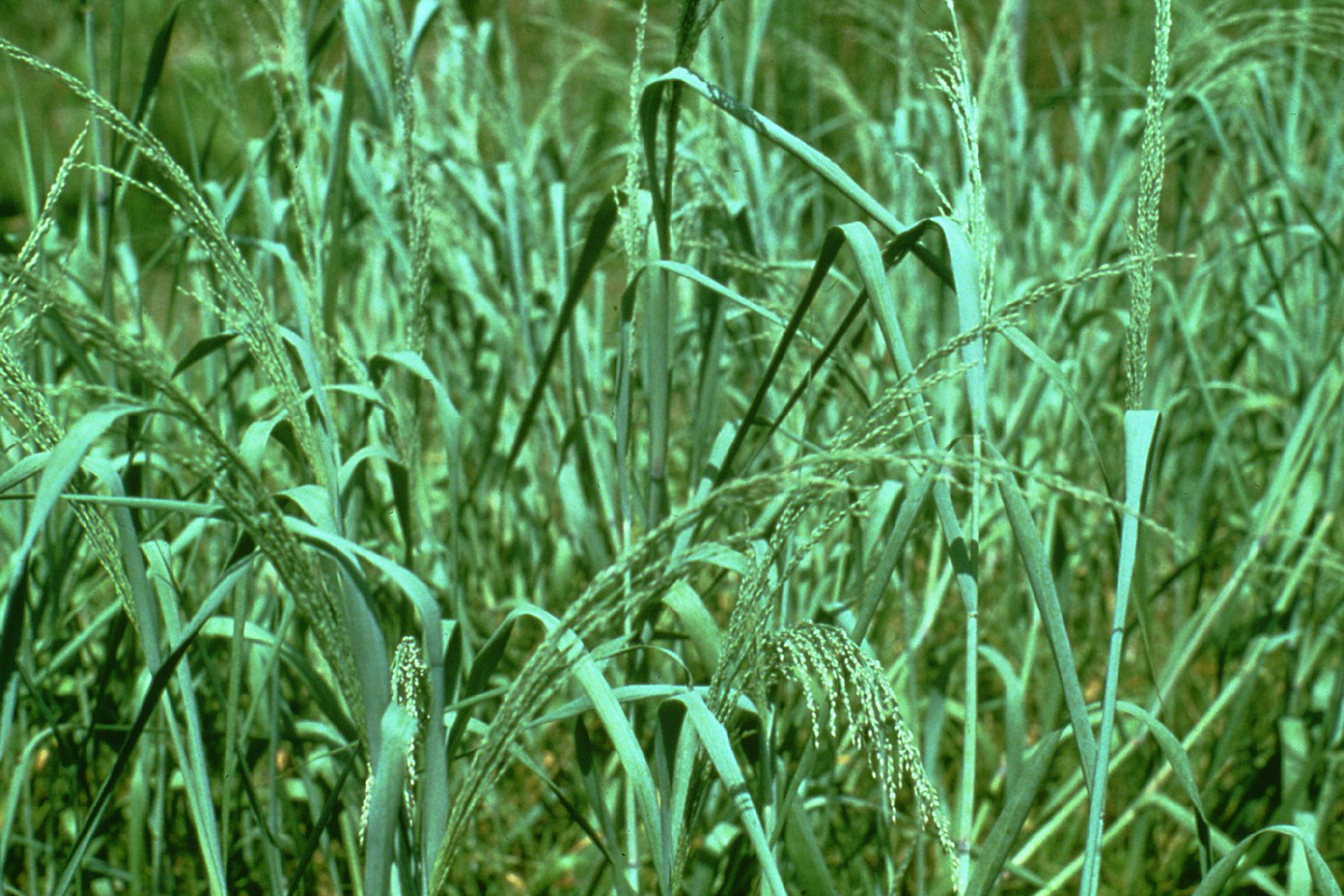

Conservation status
- Secure (NatureServe)

Scientific classification
- Kingdom: Plantae
- Clade: Tracheophytes
- Clade: Angiosperms
- Clade: Monocots
- Clade: Commelinids
- Order: Poales
- Family: Poaceae
- Subfamily: Panicoideae
- Genus: Panicum
- Species: P. amarum

Binomial name
- Panicum amarum Elliott

Synonyms
- Chasea amara (Elliott) Nieuwl.; Panicum amaroides Scribn. & Merr.; Panicum amarulum Hitchc. & Chase

= Panicum amarum =

Species of flowering plant

Panicum amarum is a species of grass known by the common name bitter panicum. It is native to North America, where it is found in coastal regions along the East Coast and Gulf Coast of the United States and into northeastern Mexico. It also occurs in The Bahamas and in Cuba.

This perennial grass grows from a thick rhizome. It has stems up to 2.5 meters tall and 1 centimeter thick. It may grow erect or bent over. The thick, firm leaves are up to half a meter long. They are bluish in color. The inflorescence is a narrowed panicle up to 80 centimeters long by 17 wide. Some seed is produced but most reproduction is vegetative, with new plants sprouting from tillers and the rhizome.

This grass is commonly used for dune stabilization projects. It is used to prevent erosion. The aboveground plant parts act as a windbreak, preventing the sand from being blown away, and the large root system stabilizes the sand in place. It can also be used in revegetation projects at other areas, such as mine spoils. Specifically, var. amarulum is valuable for these projects. The roots grow six feet deep. The cultivar 'Atlantic' is available.

A cultivar of P. amarum called 'Dewey Blue' is also used for ornamental purposes.
