= Tumbleweed (disambiguation) =

A tumbleweed is a kind of plant habit or structure.

Tumbleweed, tumble-weed or tumble weed may also refer to:

== Films ==
- Tumbleweeds (1925 film), William S. Hart film
- Tumbling Tumbleweeds (1935 film), Gene Autry film
- Tumbleweed (1953 film), Nathan Juran film
- Tumbleweeds (1999 film), Gavin O'Connor film

== Music ==
- Tumbleweed (band), an Australian band
- The Tumbleweeds, also known as "Cole Wilson and His Tumbleweeds", a New Zealand band
- Tumbleweeds, a Dutch band featuring Ton Masseurs
- "Tumbleweed" (song), by Sylvia, 1980
- "Tumbleweed", a song by Jinjer from Duél (Jinjer album) (2025)
- "Tumbleweed", a song by Keith Urban from The Speed of Now Part 1 (2020)
- ”Tumbleweed Connection”, an album by Elton John (1970)

== Organizations ==
- Tumbleweed Tex Mex Grill & Margarita Bar, a restaurant chain
- Tumbleweed Communications, a former Internet security corporation, acquired by Axway in 2008
- Tumbleweed Tiny House Company

== Plants ==
- Amaranthus albus
- Amaranthus graecizans
- Anemone virginiana, tumble-weed
- Anastatica, rose of Jericho, also known as Palestinian tumbleweed
- Centaurea diffusa, diffuse knapweed
- Centaurea stoebe, spotted knapweed
- Corispermum hyssopifolium
- Dysphania atriplicifolia, tumble-weed
- Ficinia spiralis, a New Zealand sedge
- Panicum capillare
- Psoralea, white tumbleweeds
- Salsola (synonym Kali), tumbleweed (some species)
  - Salsola tragus, the usual tumbleweed appearing in Western movies
- Selaginella lepidophylla, a tumbleweed spikemoss, also known as rose of Jericho
- Sisymbrium altissimum, tumbleweed mustard

== Other uses ==
- Tumbleweeds (comic strip), by Tom K. Ryan
- Tumbleweed (operating system), a rolling release version of openSUSE Linux
- The tumbleweed gambit, a variation in the King's Gambit chess opening

== See also ==
- Tumble (disambiguation)
- Weed (disambiguation)
