= Temnochalepus =

Scientific classification
- Kingdom: Animalia
- Phylum: Arthropoda
- Clade: Pancrustacea
- Class: Insecta
- Order: Coleoptera
- Suborder: Polyphaga
- Infraorder: Cucujiformia
- Family: Chrysomelidae
- Subfamily: Cassidinae
- Tribe: Chalepini
- Genus: Temnochalepus; Uhmann, 1935

Genus of leaf beetles

Temnochalepus is a genus of beetles belonging to the family Chrysomelidae.

== Species ==
- Temnochalepus circumcinctus (Weise, 1910)
- Temnochalepus imitans Uhmann, 1935
- Temnochalepus insolitus Uhmann, 1935
- Temnochalepus lugubris (Chapuis, 1877)
