= Temnochalepus imitans =

Scientific classification
- Kingdom: Animalia
- Phylum: Arthropoda
- Class: Insecta
- Order: Coleoptera
- Suborder: Polyphaga
- Infraorder: Cucujiformia
- Family: Chrysomelidae
- Genus: Temnochalepus
- Species: T. imitans

Binomial name
- Temnochalepus imitans Uhmann, 1935

Species of beetle

Temnochalepus imitans is a species of beetle of the family Chrysomelidae. It is found in Brazil (Rio de Janeiro).

== Biology ==
The food plant is unknown.
