= Panicum hallii =

Scientific classification
- Kingdom: Plantae
- Clade: Tracheophytes
- Clade: Angiosperms
- Clade: Monocots
- Clade: Commelinids
- Order: Poales
- Family: Poaceae
- Subfamily: Panicoideae
- Genus: Panicum
- Species: P. hallii

Binomial name
- Panicum hallii Vasey

Species of grass

Panicum hallii, commonly known as Hall's panicgrass, is a perennial bunch grass in the genus Panicum which is native to the south/southwestern regions of the United States, and into southern Mexico.
