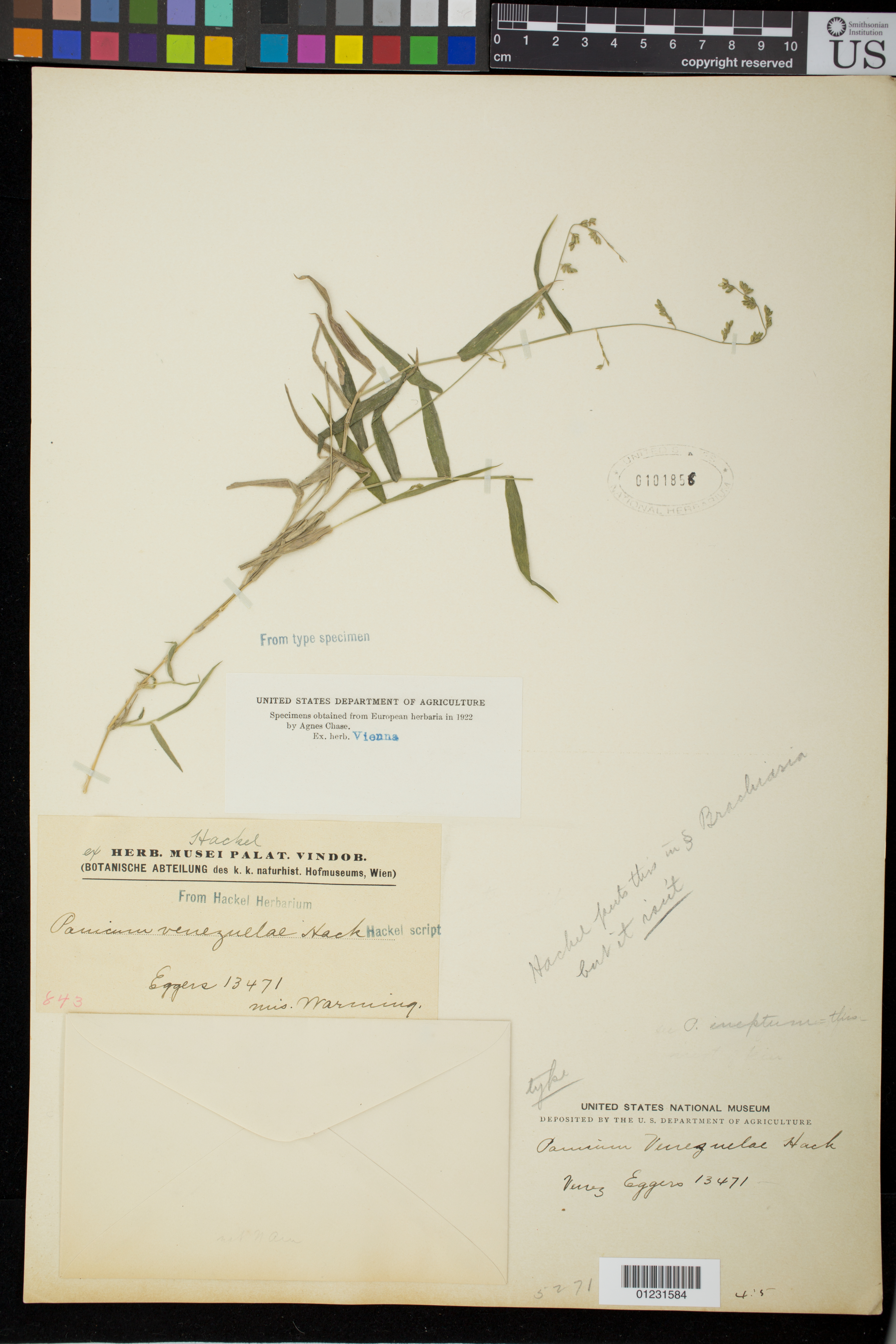

Scientific classification
- Kingdom: Plantae
- Clade: Tracheophytes
- Clade: Angiosperms
- Clade: Monocots
- Clade: Commelinids
- Order: Poales
- Family: Poaceae
- Subfamily: Panicoideae
- Tribe: Paspaleae
- Subtribe: Paspalinae
- Genus: Drakkaria; C.Silva & Zuloaga
- Species: D. venezuelae

Binomial name
- Drakkaria venezuelae (Hack.) C.Silva & Zuloaga

Synonyms
- Brachiaria venezuelae (Hack.) Henrard; Panicum berteronianum Mez, nom. illeg.; Panicum ineptum Hitchc. & Chase; Panicum venezuelae Hack. (1901) (basionym)

= Drakkaria =

Genus of grasses

Drakkaria is a genus of grasses. It includes a single species, Drakkaria venezuelae, a perennial native to the tropical Americas. It has a disjunct distribution in Guatemala, Honduras, northwestern Costa Rica, Cuba, Hispaniola, Venezuela, and northeastern Brazil, where it grows in tropical dry forests.

The species was first described as Panicum venezuelae by Eduard Hackel in 1901. In 2024 Christian Silva and Fernando Omar Zuloaga placed the species in the newly-described genus Drakkaria as Drakkaria venezuelae.
