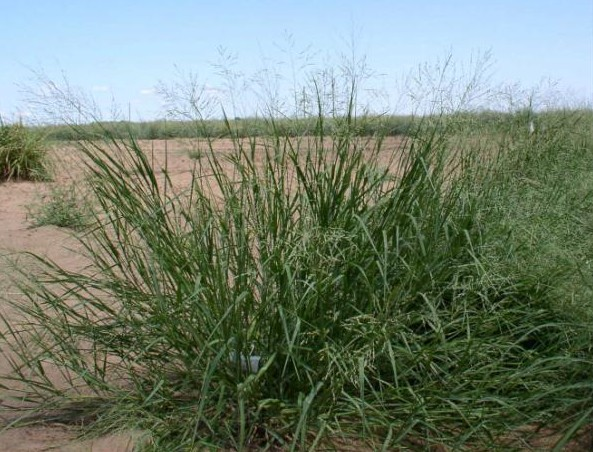

Scientific classification
- Kingdom: Plantae
- Clade: Tracheophytes
- Clade: Angiosperms
- Clade: Monocots
- Clade: Commelinids
- Order: Poales
- Family: Poaceae
- Subfamily: Panicoideae
- Genus: Panicum
- Species: P. coloratum

Binomial name
- Panicum coloratum L.

= Panicum coloratum =

Species of grass

Panicum coloratum is a species of grass known by the common names kleingrass, blue panicgrass (USA), white buffalograss (southern Africa); Bambatsi panic, makarikari grass, and coolah grass (Australia). It is native to Africa, and it has been introduced elsewhere, such as the United States and Australia, and bred into many cultivars.

This plant is variable in appearance. In general, is a perennial bunchgrass which usually has rhizomes. The firm, mostly upright stems grow up to 1.4 m (4.6 ft) tall. The leaf blades are 10 to 30 cm (3.9 to 11.8 in) long. They are green to a waxy blue-green color. The panicles are variable in length. The spikelets are green and purple.

This grass is used as a pasture grass and to make hay. It produces a large amount of forage for animals. It is drought-tolerant and does well in hot climates. This C4 plant can grow on saline soils and requires some of sodium for effective photosynthesis. Different cultivars have varying tolerances of sodium. While it makes a good graze for most animals, the grass has occasionally been associated with liver damage and photosensitivity in young ruminants and horses. This photosensitivity can lead to sunburn, which causes swelling of the head and ears of the animal, a condition commonly called "swellhead".

Cultivars include 'Pollock', 'Bambatsi', 'Bushman Mine', 'Verde', and 'Kabulabula'.
