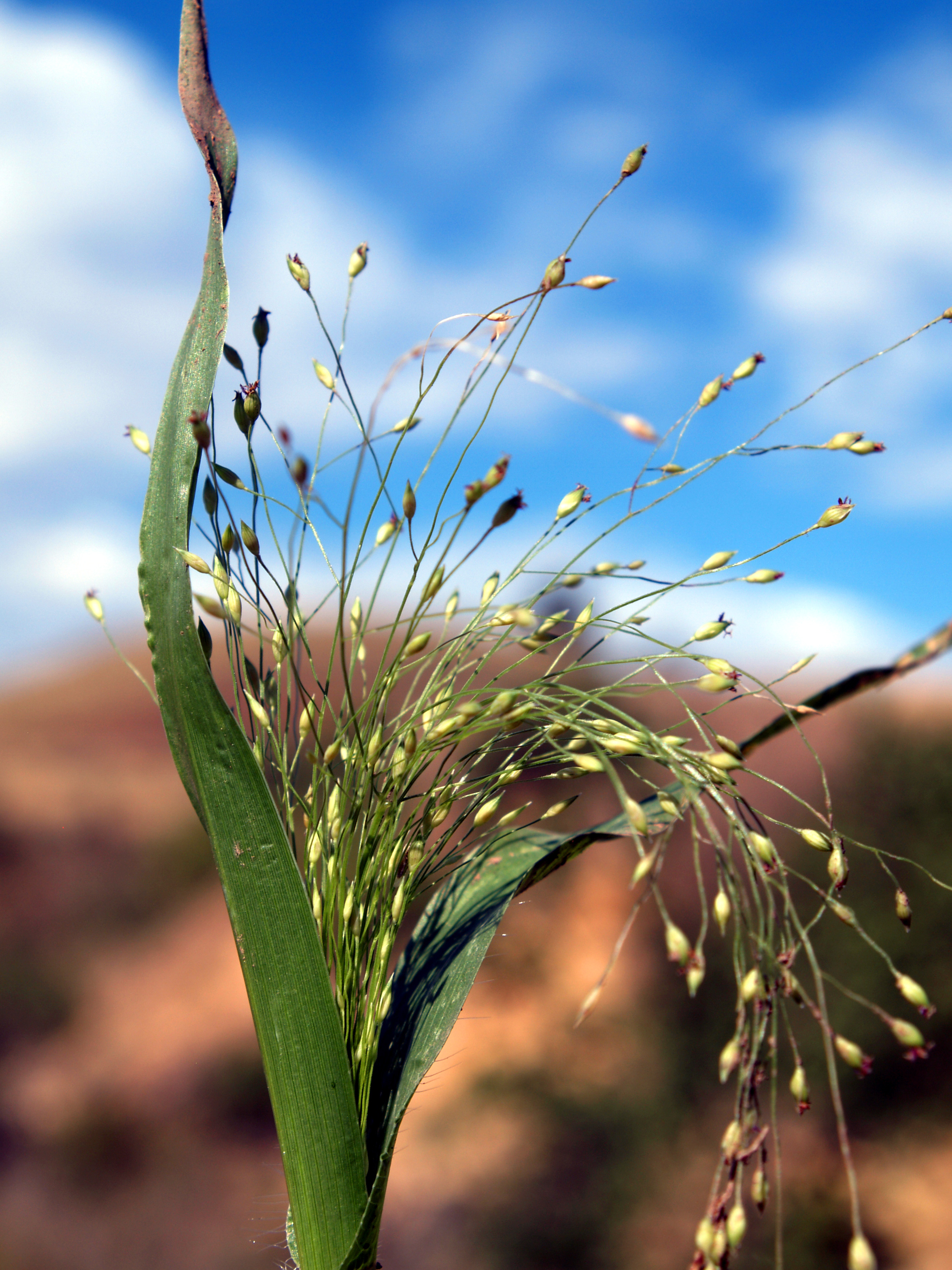

Scientific classification
- Kingdom: Plantae
- Clade: Tracheophytes
- Clade: Angiosperms
- Clade: Monocots
- Clade: Commelinids
- Order: Poales
- Family: Poaceae
- Subfamily: Panicoideae
- Genus: Panicum
- Species: P. capillare

Binomial name
- Panicum capillare L.

Synonyms
- Panicum barbipulvinatum

= Panicum capillare =

Species of flowering plant

Panicum capillare, known by the common name witchgrass, is a species of grass. It is a native plant to most of North America from the East Coast through all of the West Coast and California. It can be found as an introduced species in Eurasia, and as a weed in gardens and landscaped areas. It grows in many types of habitat.

== Description ==
Panicum capillare is an annual bunchgrass growing decumbent or erect to heights exceeding one meter (3 feet). It is green to blue- or purple-tinged in color. In texture it is quite hairy, especially on the leaves and at the nodes. The ligule is a fringe of long hairs.

The inflorescence is a large open panicle which may be over half the total length of the plant, up to half a meter long. At maturity it fans out, spreading to a width over 20 centimeters. As the plant dies and dries, the panicle may break off whole and becomes a tumbleweed.

Panicum capillare has been proposed as a solution to herbicide-contaminated soil, showing an uptake of atrazine in testing, and growing readily in the same soils as agricultural crops.
