= Index Seminum =

Annual catalogue of seeds

Index Seminum meaning in Latin "seed index", is a catalog of seeds of wild or cultivated plants offered free of charge or in exchange for seeds of equivalent value by botanical gardens or arboretums. It is published annually or biennially by these institutions, traditionally in A5 format (148 × 210 mm). Seeds presented in Index Seminum are readily available and kept in seed banks. More than 1000 institutions from 48 countries publish Index Seminum with the intention of establishing a free and fair exchange. The exchange of seeds and spores constitutes one of the main ways of increasing the living collections of botanical gardens, and is also a way of obtaining material for the development of research work.

== Components of an Index Seminum ==
Generally there are several items that are included in the listings:

- Complete botanical garden references, name, address, etc.
- A concise but complete presentation of the botanical garden.
- The general climatology of the botanical garden referred to.
- Geographical location of the botanical garden.
- A page of information explaining useful services related to the operation of the activity related to seeds.
- A list of the plants of the towns near the botanical garden.
- Occasionally, a list of available species brought from tropical or other locations.
- A bibliography of the reference works.
- Sometimes a list of the people dedicated to caring for the seedbed and exchanges is attached.

The classification of plant species is made by alphabetical order of the families to which they belong, and another by genus. The seeds collected in the botanical garden itself must have a separate classification.

It is important that the origin of the seeds is well specified, clarifying whether they were collected outside or inside the botanical garden itself.

== History ==
Tradition of collecting and exchanging seeds dates back to 18th century. In the 21st century this tradition is reexamined in the context of the conservation of biodiversity and the fight against invasive species.

In terms of nomenclature, the old Index Seminum are precious because they sometimes contain the description of new species such as Telanthera bettzickiana, described in 1862 by Eduard August von Regel in the Index Seminum of the Saint Petersburg Botanical Garden.

In Spain The preparation of the catalog of the seeds available in a botanical garden is a traditional activity, which began in Spain at the beginning of the 19th century, and has remained in the same conditions to this day. In 1800 Casimiro Gómez Ortega published the first Index Seminum of the Royal Botanical Garden of Madrid. The Botanical Garden of Valencia published its first seed catalog in 1862. Every year the Ibero-Marcaronesic Network of Botanical Gardens offers the Index Seminum pro mutual commutatione of the twenty one gardens associated with this network.

The Index Seminum of the University Botanical Garden of Granada in Sierra Nevada offers the seeds of the 1980s Endemisms of the Sierra.
