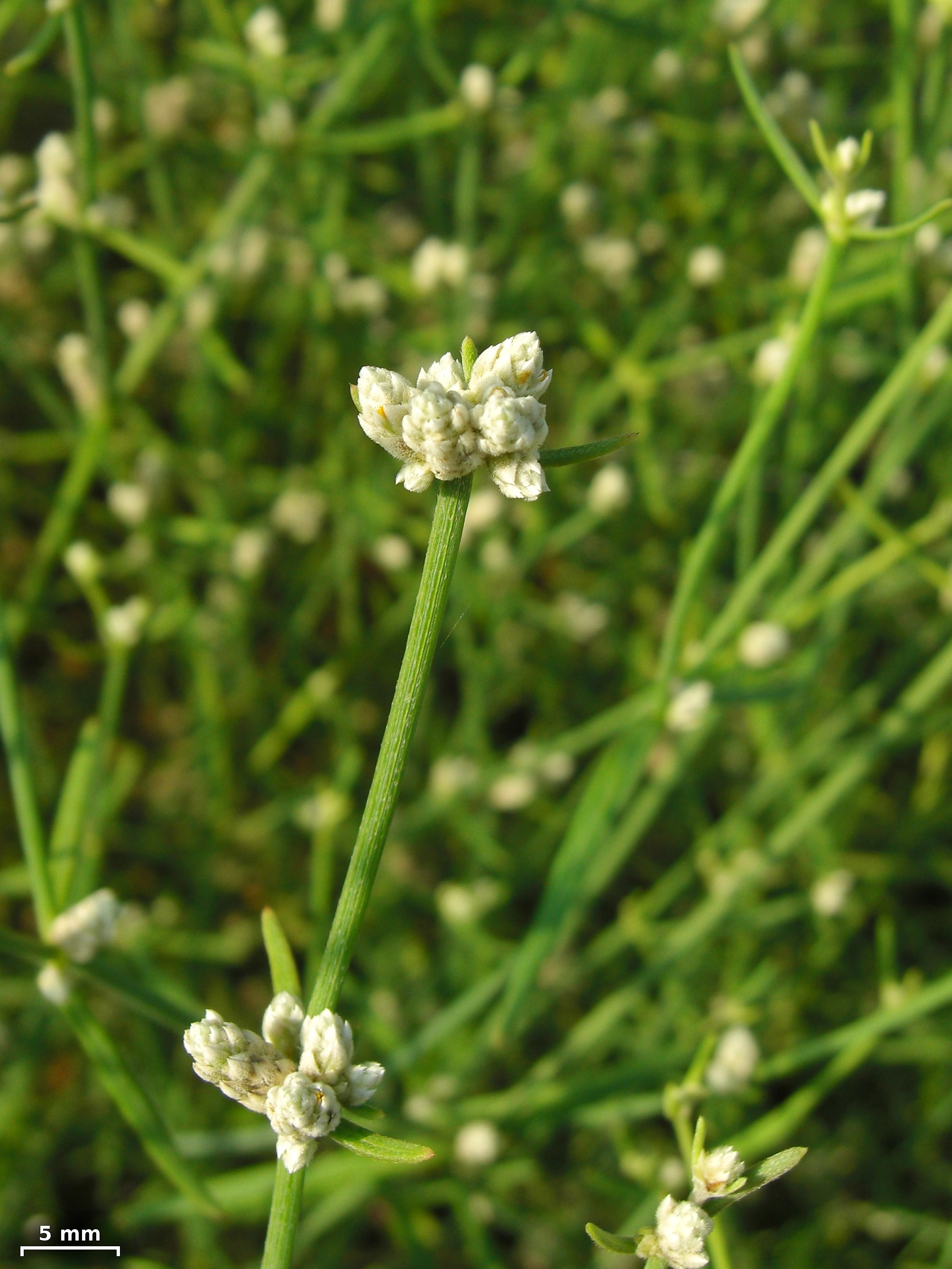

Conservation status
- Least Concern (IUCN 3.1)

Scientific classification
- Kingdom: Plantae
- Clade: Tracheophytes
- Clade: Angiosperms
- Clade: Eudicots
- Order: Caryophyllales
- Family: Amaranthaceae
- Genus: Alternanthera
- Species: A. filifolia

Binomial name
- Alternanthera filifolia (Hook.f.) J.T.Howell

= Alternanthera filifolia =

Species of flowering plant

Alternanthera filifolia is a species of flowering plant in the family Amaranthaceae. It is native to the Galápagos Islands.

This plant is limited to the Galápagos, but it is common there in lowlands and coastal shrublands. It is variable in morphology, forming shrubs 0.5 to 1.5 meters tall.
