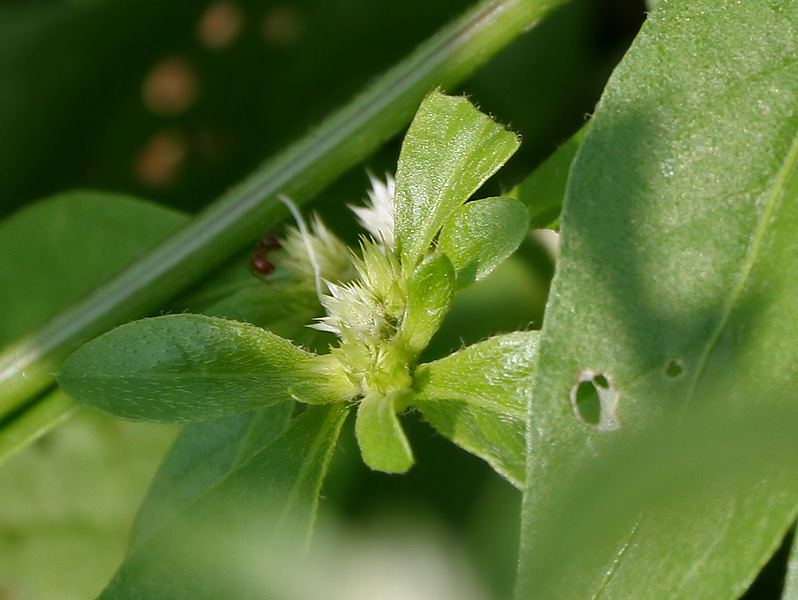

Scientific classification
- Kingdom: Plantae
- Clade: Tracheophytes
- Clade: Angiosperms
- Clade: Eudicots
- Order: Caryophyllales
- Family: Amaranthaceae
- Genus: Alternanthera
- Species: A. ficoidea

Binomial name
- Alternanthera ficoidea (L.) Sm.

Synonyms
- Alternanthera tenella Colla; Gomphrena ficoidea L.

= Alternanthera ficoidea =

Species of flowering plant

Alternanthera ficoidea, also known as Joseph's coat, Parrot leaf, is a species of flowering plant in the family Amaranthaceae. It is native to the Caribbean and South America and occurs elsewhere in the tropics as an introduced species. It is considered invasive in Palau, the Philippines and Australia (Queensland). Propagation occurs via seeds.
