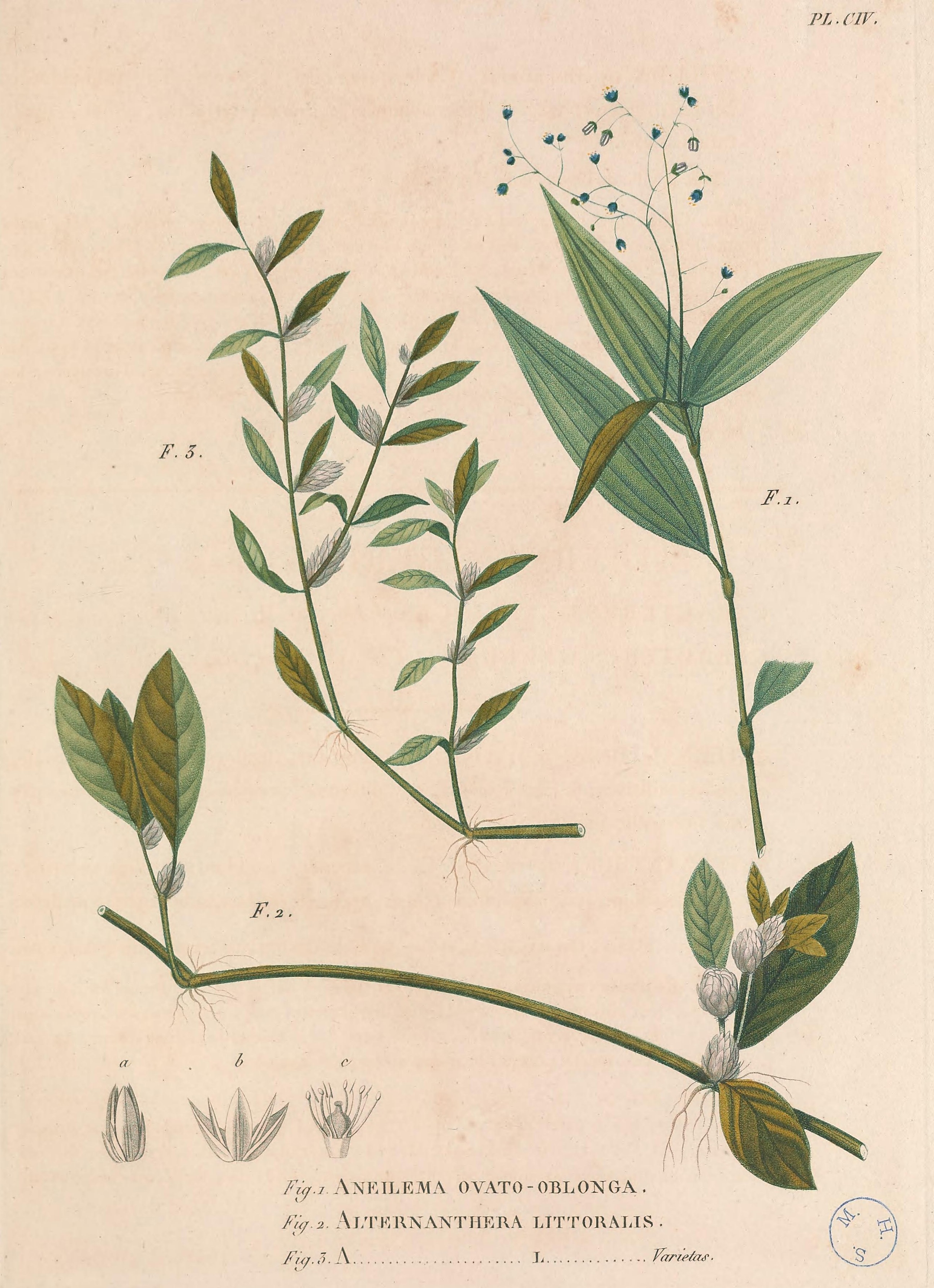

Scientific classification
- Kingdom: Plantae
- Clade: Tracheophytes
- Clade: Angiosperms
- Clade: Eudicots
- Order: Caryophyllales
- Family: Amaranthaceae
- Genus: Alternanthera
- Species: A. littoralis

Binomial name
- Alternanthera littoralis P.Beauv.

= Alternanthera littoralis =

Species of flowering plant

Alternanthera littoralis is an African species of plant in the family Amaranthaceae. The leaves are eaten as a vegetable.
