= Alternanthera snodgrassii =

Conservation status
- Vulnerable (IUCN 2.3)

Scientific classification
- Kingdom: Plantae
- Clade: Tracheophytes
- Clade: Angiosperms
- Clade: Eudicots
- Order: Caryophyllales
- Family: Amaranthaceae
- Genus: Alternanthera
- Species: A. snodgrassii

Binomial name
- Alternanthera snodgrassii (B.L. Rob.) J.T. Howell

Species of flowering plant

Alternanthera snodgrassii is a species of plant in the family Amaranthaceae. It is endemic to the Galápagos Islands of Ecuador.
