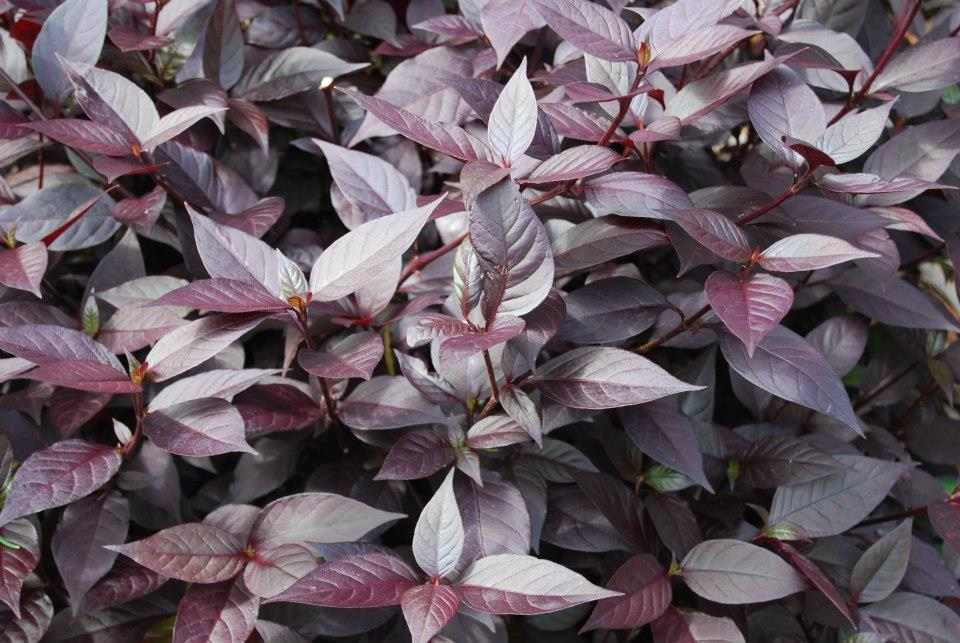
- 'Little Ruby' cultivar

Scientific classification
- Kingdom: Plantae
- Clade: Tracheophytes
- Clade: Angiosperms
- Clade: Eudicots
- Order: Caryophyllales
- Family: Amaranthaceae
- Genus: Alternanthera
- Species: A. brasiliana
- Variety: A. b. var. villosa

Trinomial name
- Alternanthera brasiliana var. villosa (Moq.) Kuntze (1891)

Synonyms
- Synonymy: Achyranthes ramosissima (Mart.) Standl. (1915); Alternanthera brasiliana var. moquinii (Webb ex Moq.) Uline & W.L.Bray (1895); Alternanthera brasiliana var. strigosa (Hassk.) Kuntze (1891); Alternanthera dentata Stuchlík ex R.E.Fr. (1913), pro syn.; Alternanthera moquinii (Webb ex Moq.) Dusén (1905); Alternanthera moquinii var. villosa Dusén (1905); Alternanthera ramosissima (Mart.) Chodat & Hassl. (1903); Alternanthera ramosissima var. missionum Pedersen (1997); Alternanthera ramosissima var. reptans Pedersen (1997); Alternanthera strigosa Hassk. (1839); Alternanthera virgata (Schrad.) Suess. (1934); Celosia altissima Salzm. ex Moq. (1849); Celosia diffusa Hoffmanns. ex Seub. (1875); Gomphrena patula J.C.Wendl.3 (1798); Mogiphanes diffusa Mart. (1826); Mogiphanes ramosissima Mart. (1826); Mogiphanes villosa Mart. (1826); Mogiphanes virgata Schrad. (1834); Telanthera brasiliana var. villosa Moq. (1849) (basionym); Telanthera brasiliensis f. grisea Chodat (1901); Telanthera diffusa (Mart.) Moq. (1849); Telanthera moquinii Webb ex Moq. (1849); Telanthera ramosissima (Mart.) Moq. (1849); Telanthera ramosissima var. diffusa (Mart.) Seub. (1875); Telanthera strigosa (Hassk.) Moq. (1849); Telanthera virgata (Schrad.) Moq. (1849)

= Alternanthera brasiliana var. villosa =

Species of flowering plant

Alternanthera brasiliana var. villosa, known as little ruby and ruby leaf alternanthera, is a fast-growing ornamental groundcover plant in the amaranth family. It ranges from southeastern Mexico to Guatemala, Nicaragua, Colombia, Ecuador, Peru, Brazil, Bolivia, and northeastern Argentina.

It was first described as Telanthera brasiliana var. villosa in 1849 by Alfred Moquin-Tandon. It is known by many synonyms, including Alternanthera dentata, described by Stuchlík and Robert Elias Fries in 1913.

The plant is chiefly grown for its coloured foliage. It is similar in appearance to Alternanthera bettzickiana, and both have some strikingly similar looking cultivars.

== Description ==
Growing 60 to 80 cm, the herbaceous plant features burgundy-coloured, pointed foliage with a radiant ruby red rearwards and it has a compact, mounding and spreading habit. The popular cultivar 'Little Ruby' is shorter and slightly less brownish in colour, in addition to having smaller leaves as well. The plant features dark creamy, pompom-like flowers, which bloom in winter and early spring.

== Cultivation ==
Suited for pots, it may be used as a hedge and as a contrasting plant to the more lighter foliage in the garden. Thriving in humid conditions and has heat tolerance, the plant does best in well drained soil under a full sun to partial shade, with somewhat shaded frost-free location in the garden. The plant can easily be propagated by stem cuttings and would root readily in plain water.

== Gallery ==
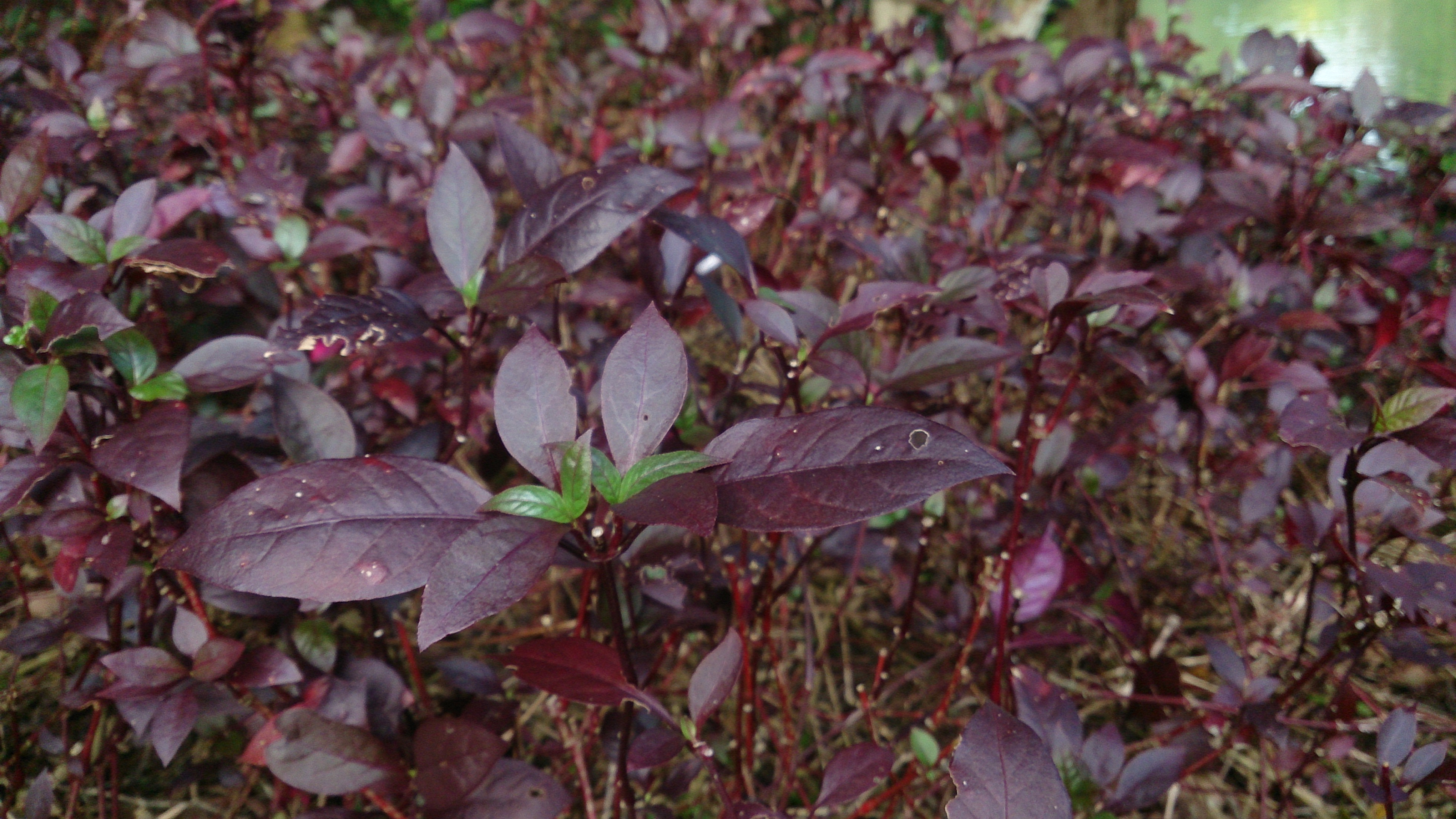
'Brazilian Red Hots' cultivar

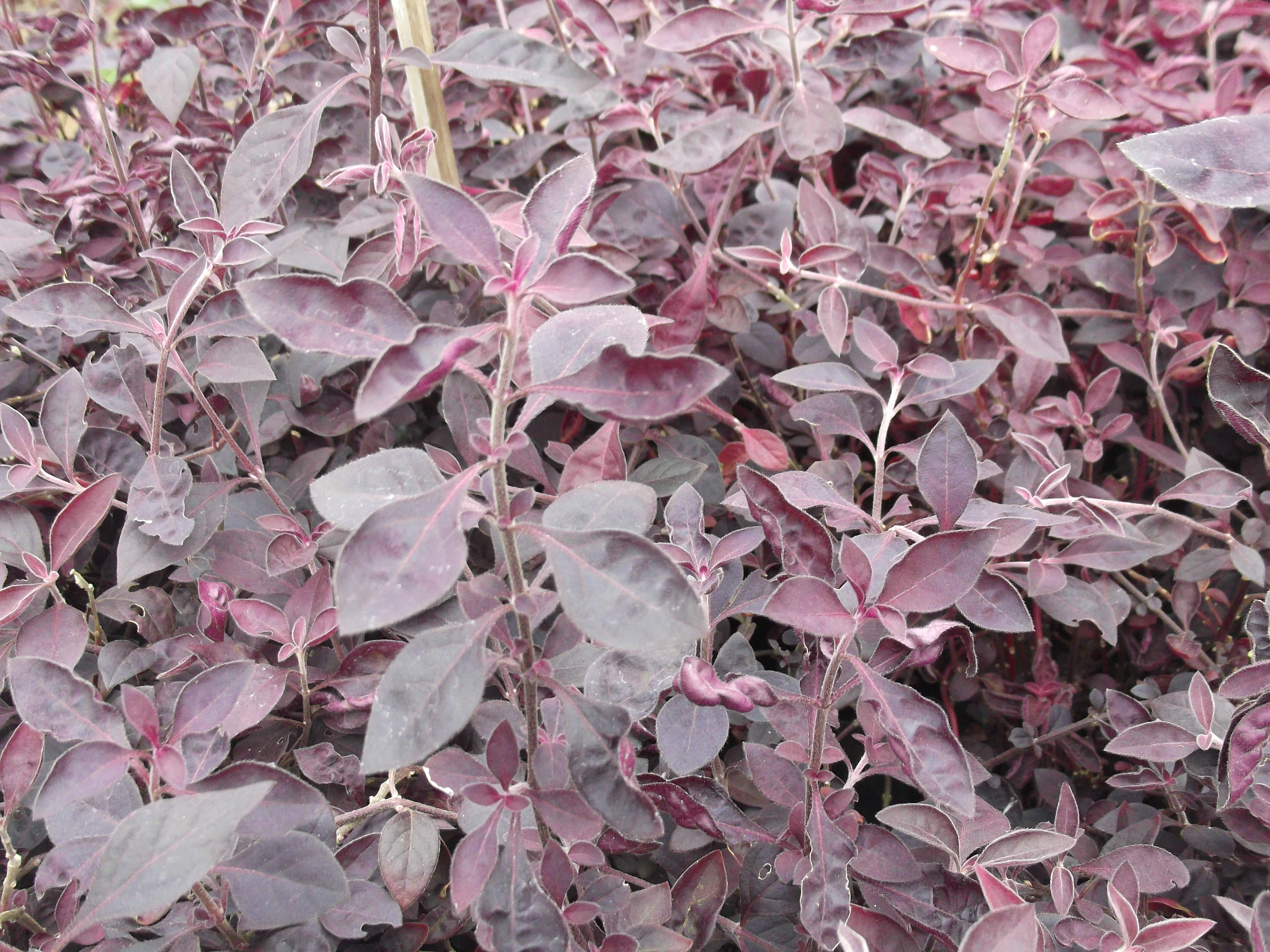
'Little Ruby' cultivar in India

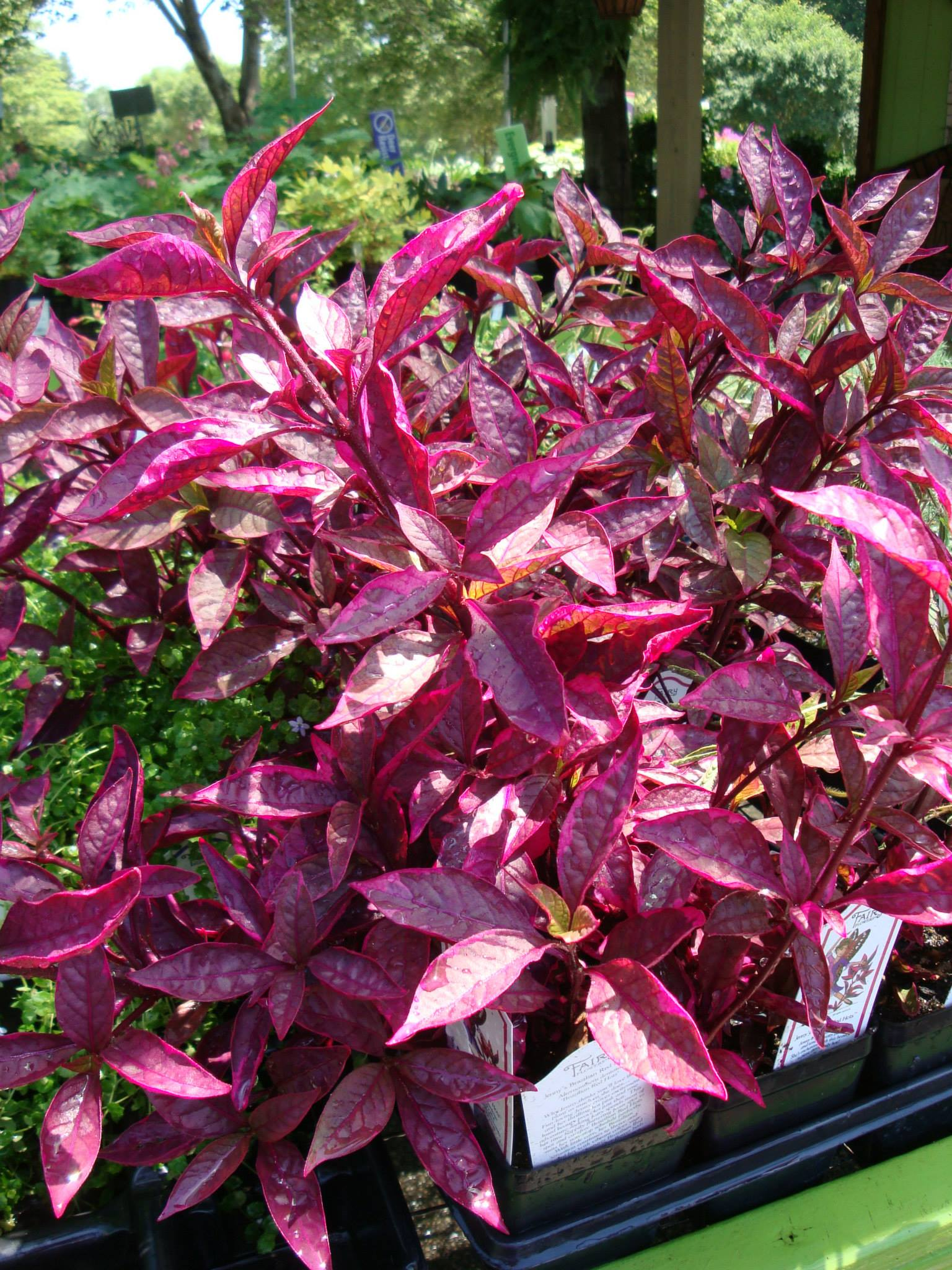
'Brazilian Red Hots' cultivar with bright pink colours

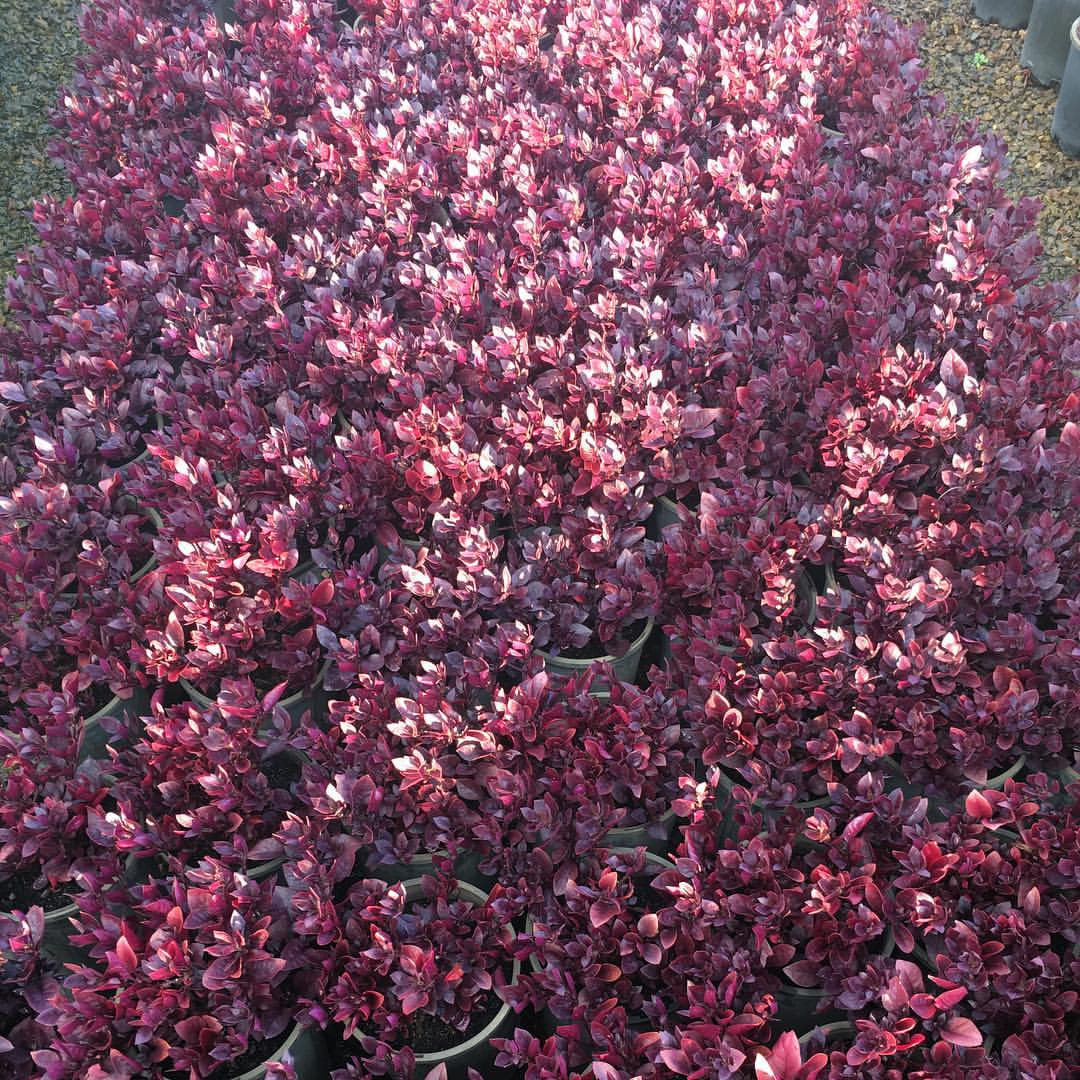
'Little Ruby' placed in containers

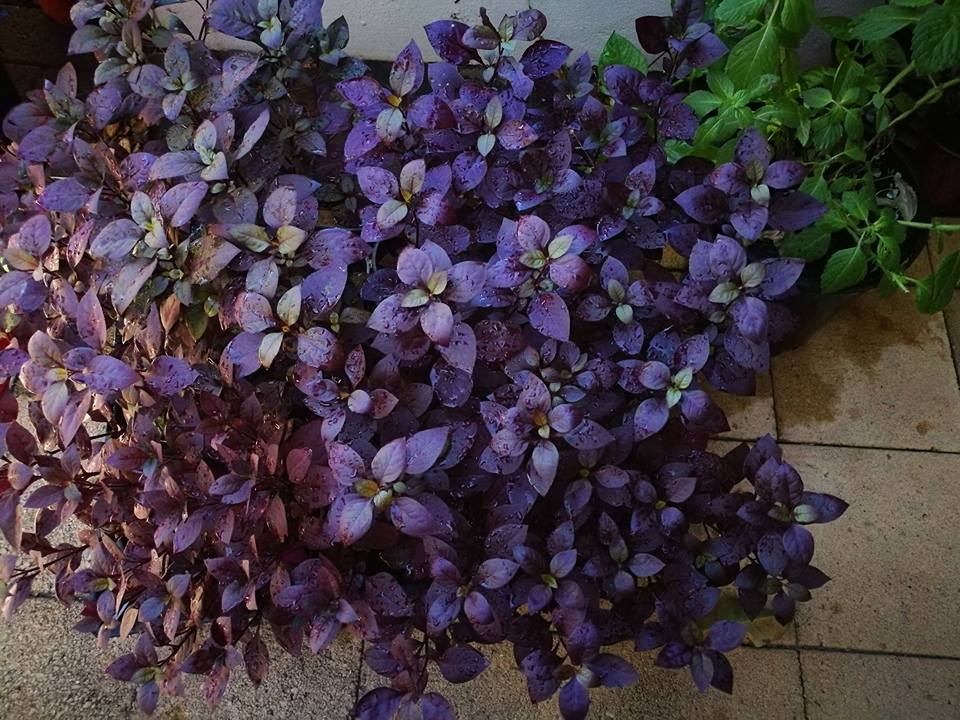
Group of Little Rubies in a home garden

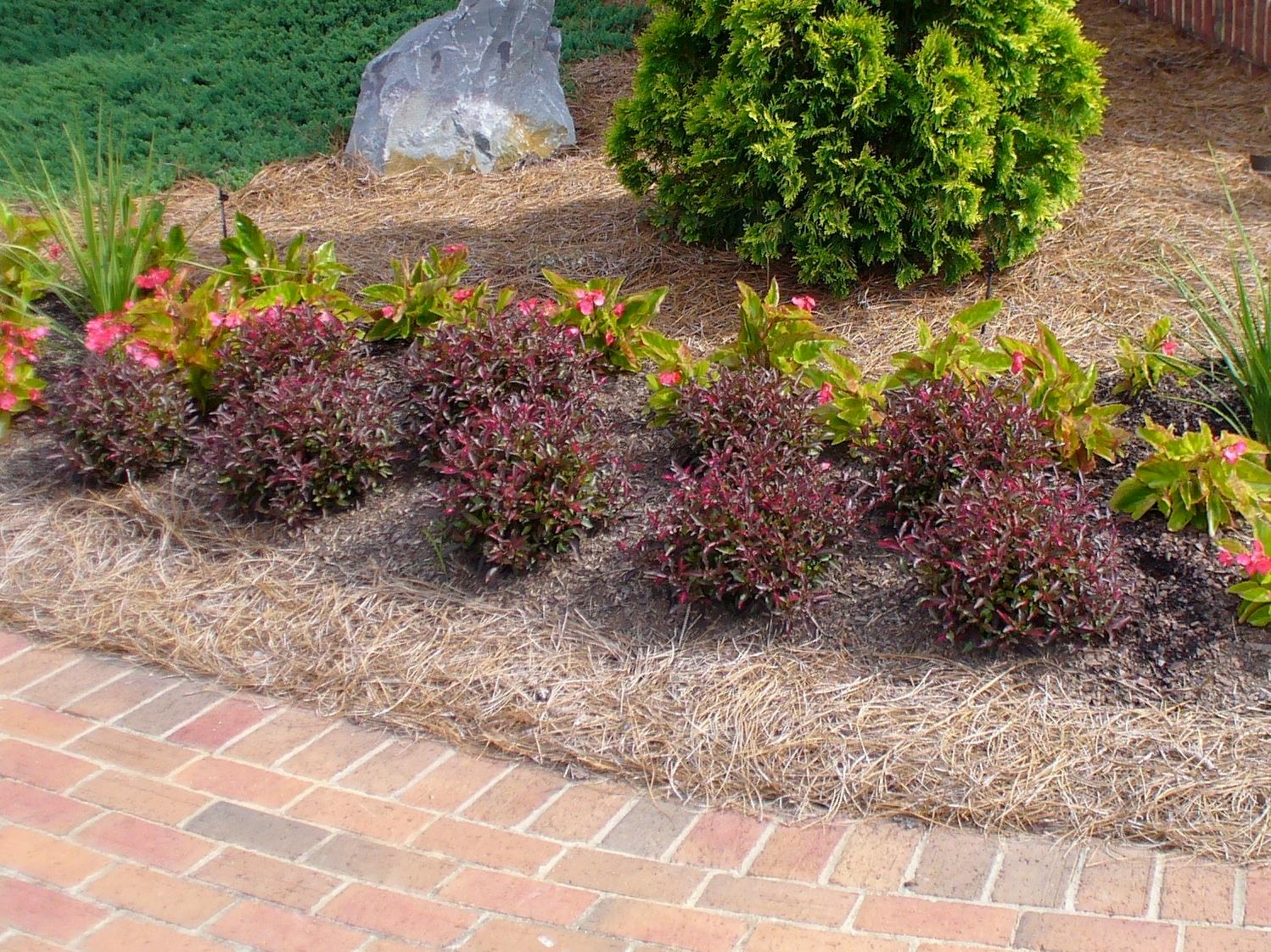
As a hedge near a walkway
