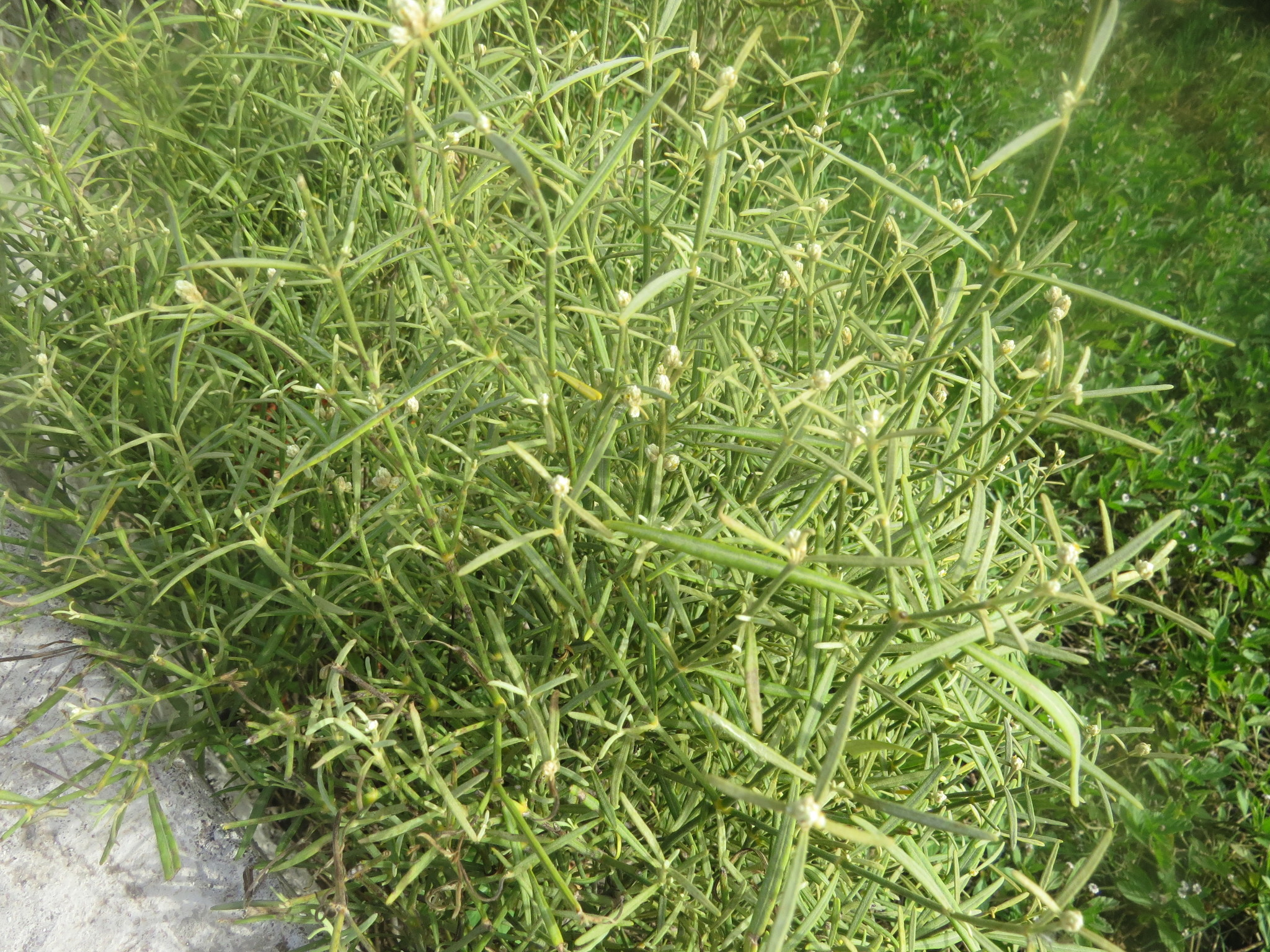

Conservation status
- Vulnerable (IUCN 2.3)

Scientific classification
- Kingdom: Plantae
- Clade: Embryophytes
- Clade: Tracheophytes
- Clade: Angiosperms
- Clade: Eudicots
- Order: Caryophyllales
- Family: Amaranthaceae
- Genus: Alternanthera
- Species: A. flavicoma

Binomial name
- Alternanthera flavicoma (Andersson) J.T. Howell

Synonyms
- Achyranthes flavicoma (Andersson) Standl.; Telanthera flavicoma Andersson

= Alternanthera flavicoma =

Species of flowering plant

Alternanthera flavicoma is a species of flowering plant in the family Amaranthaceae. It is endemic to the Galápagos Islands of Ecuador.
