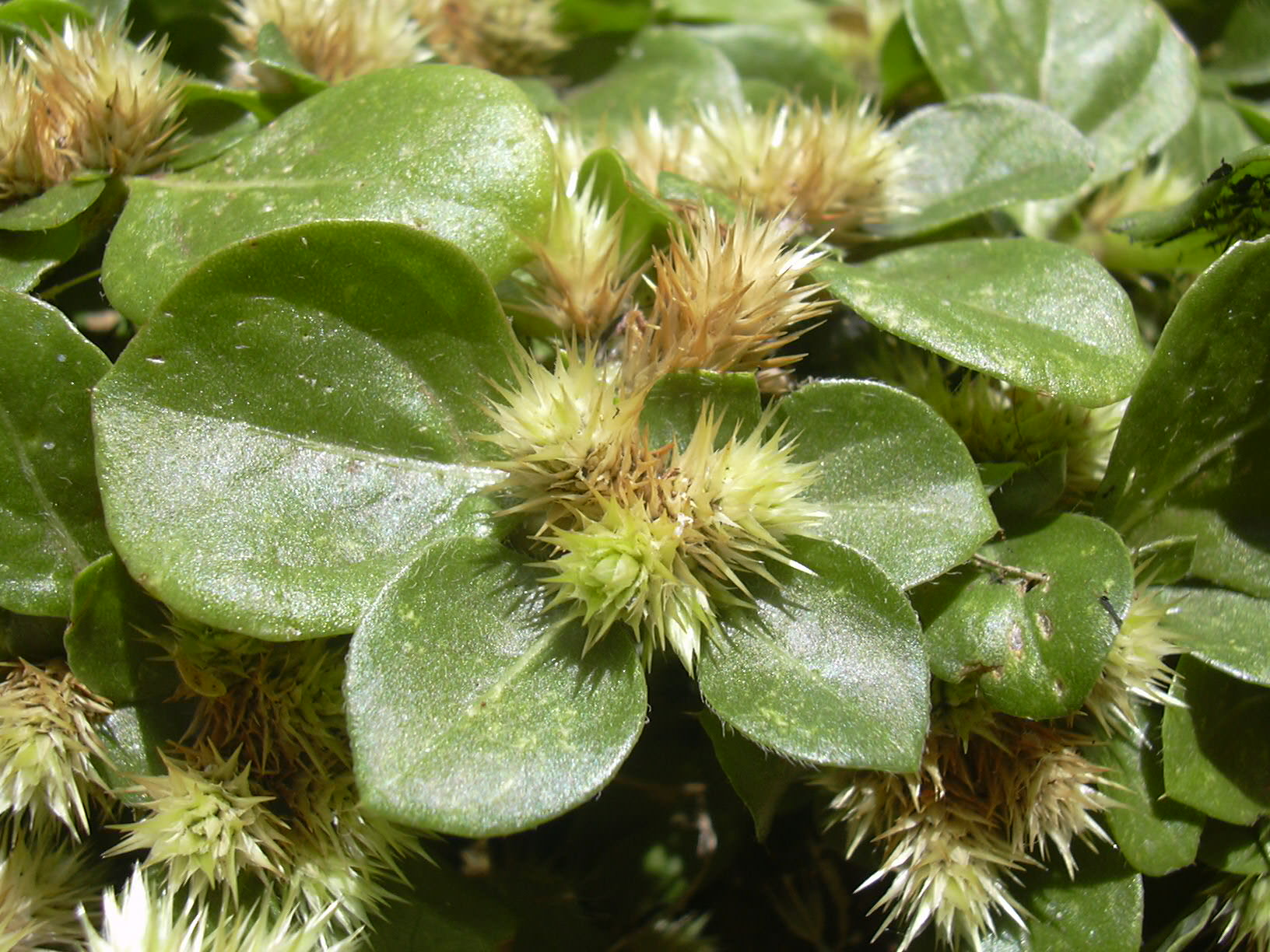
- Alternanthera caracasana (khakiweed)
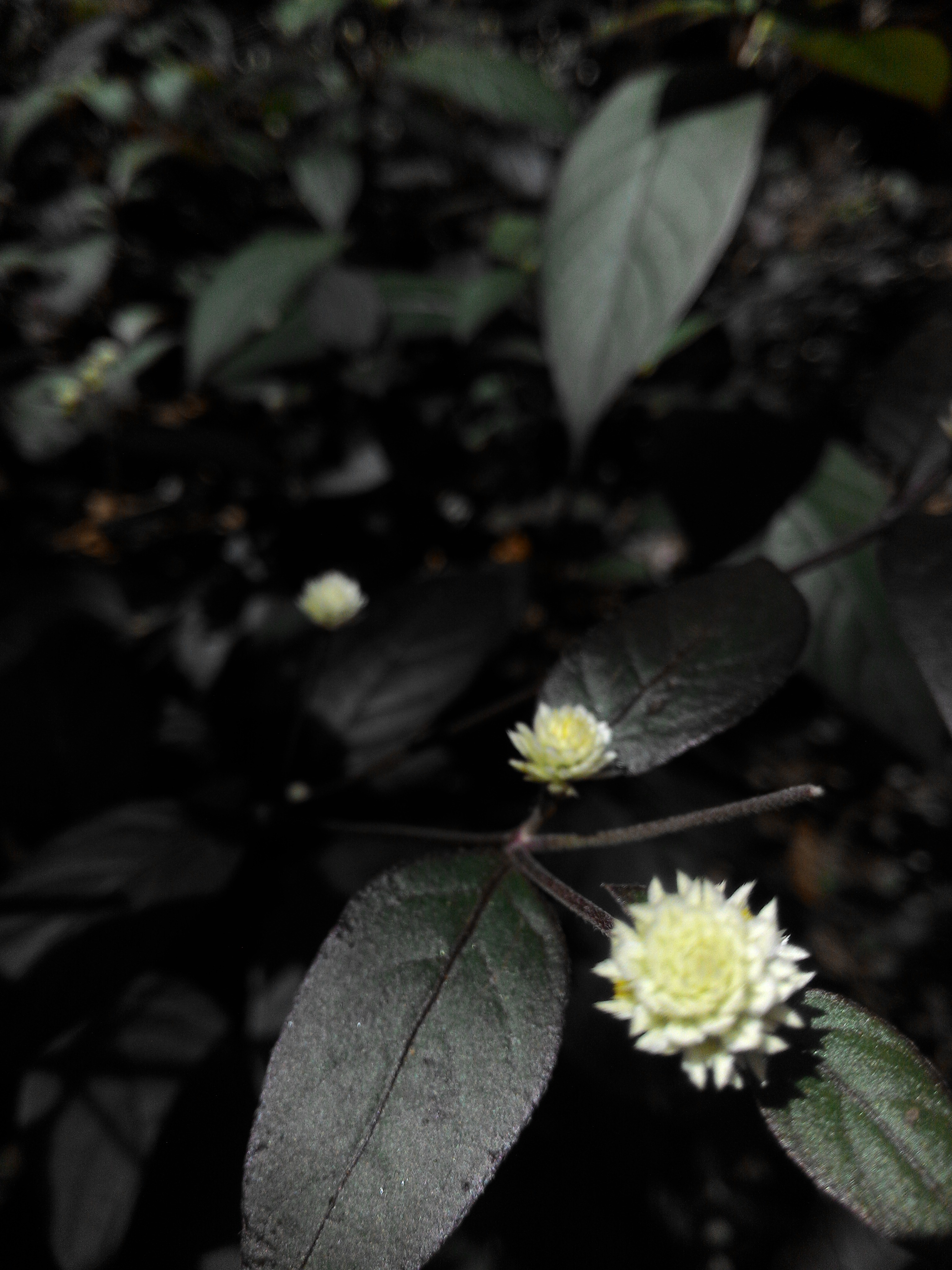
- Alternanthera bettzickiana (calicoplant)

Scientific classification
- Kingdom: Plantae
- Clade: Tracheophytes
- Clade: Angiosperms
- Clade: Eudicots
- Order: Caryophyllales
- Family: Amaranthaceae
- Subfamily: Gomphrenoideae
- Genus: Alternanthera; Forssk. (1775)

Species
- 80-200, see text

Synonyms
- Adoceton Raf. (1817); Adoketon Raf. (1817); Allaganthera Mart. (1814); Amarantesia Regel (1869); Brandesia Mart. (1826); Bucholzia Mart. (1826); Everion Raf. (1838); Jeilium Regel (1869); Mogiphanes Mart. (1826); Pityranthus Mart. (1817); Steiremis Raf. (1837); Telanthera R.Br. (1818)

= Alternanthera =

Genus of flowering plants

Alternanthera is a genus of flowering plants in the family Amaranthaceae. It is a widespread genus with most species occurring in the tropical Americas, and others in Asia, Africa, and Australia. Plants of the genus may be known generally as joyweeds, or Joseph's coat. Several species are notorious noxious weeds.

== Description ==
These are annual or perennial herbs or subshrubs. While some of the better-known species are aquatic plants, most are terrestrial. They take many forms, from prostrate to erect to floating. The leaves are oppositely arranged. The inflorescence is a spike or a rounded head occurring in the leaf axils or the ends of branches. The flowers have 5 tepals. There are 3 to 5 stamens which are fused into a rim at the bases, and 5 pseudostaminodes, appendages between the stamens that are not true staminodes. The fruit is a utricle containing one seed.

The genus Alternanthera contains both terrestrial and aquatic species. The photosynthetic pathway varies in this genus: Some species undergo C_{3} carbon fixation, one clade of 17 species has acquired the C_{4} pathway, and yet other species have an intermediate C_{3}-C_{4} pathway.

== Species ==
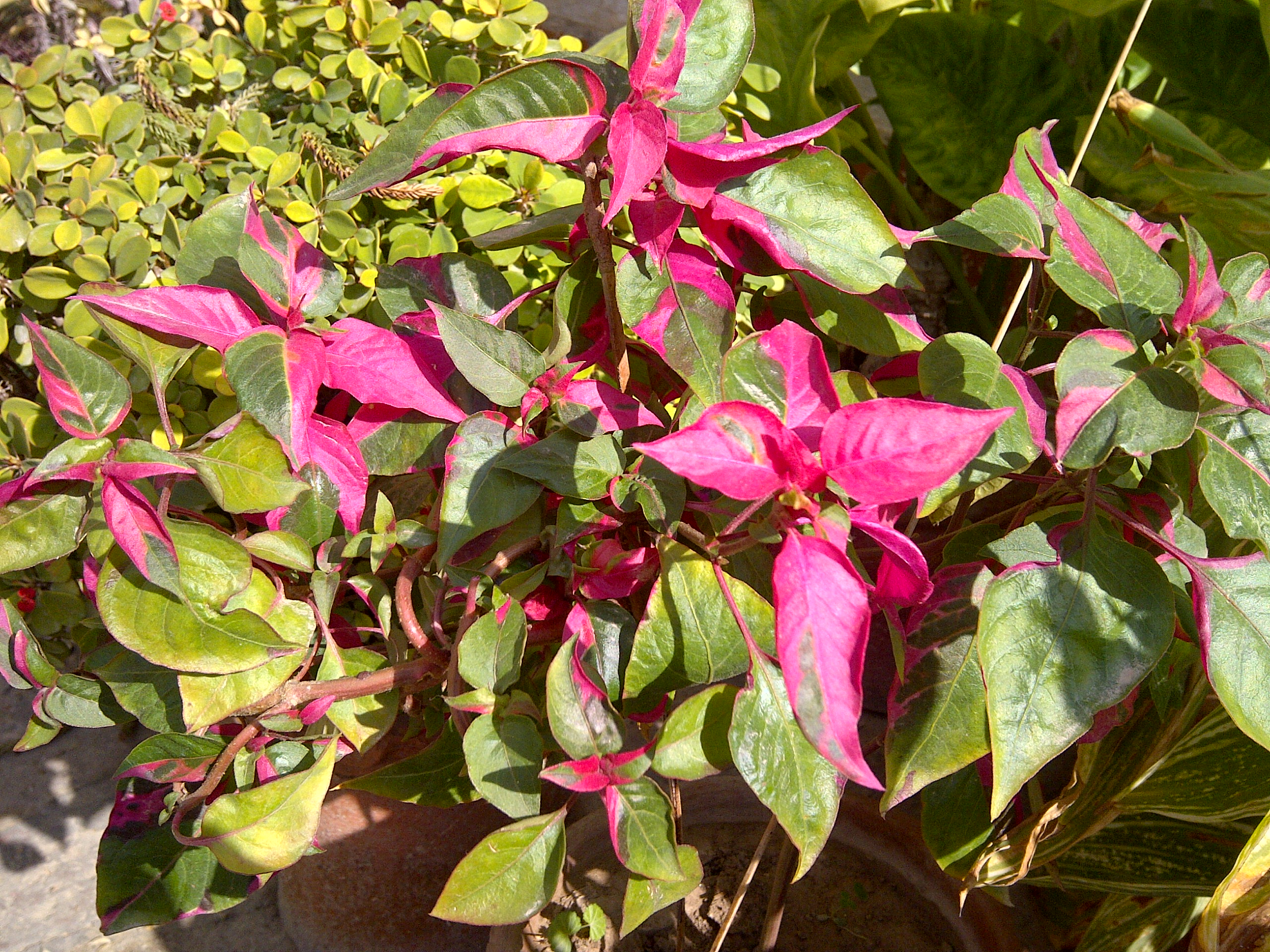
Alternanthera 'Party Time'

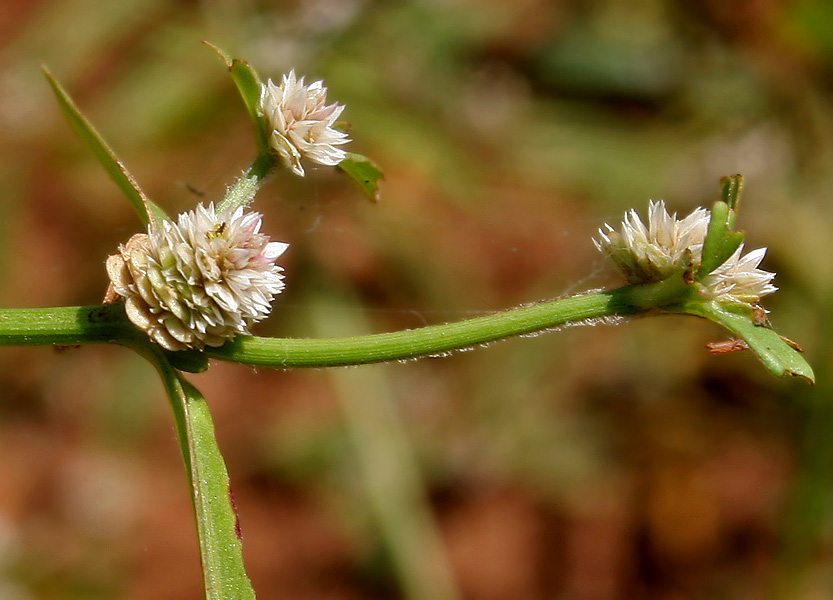
Alternanthera sessilis

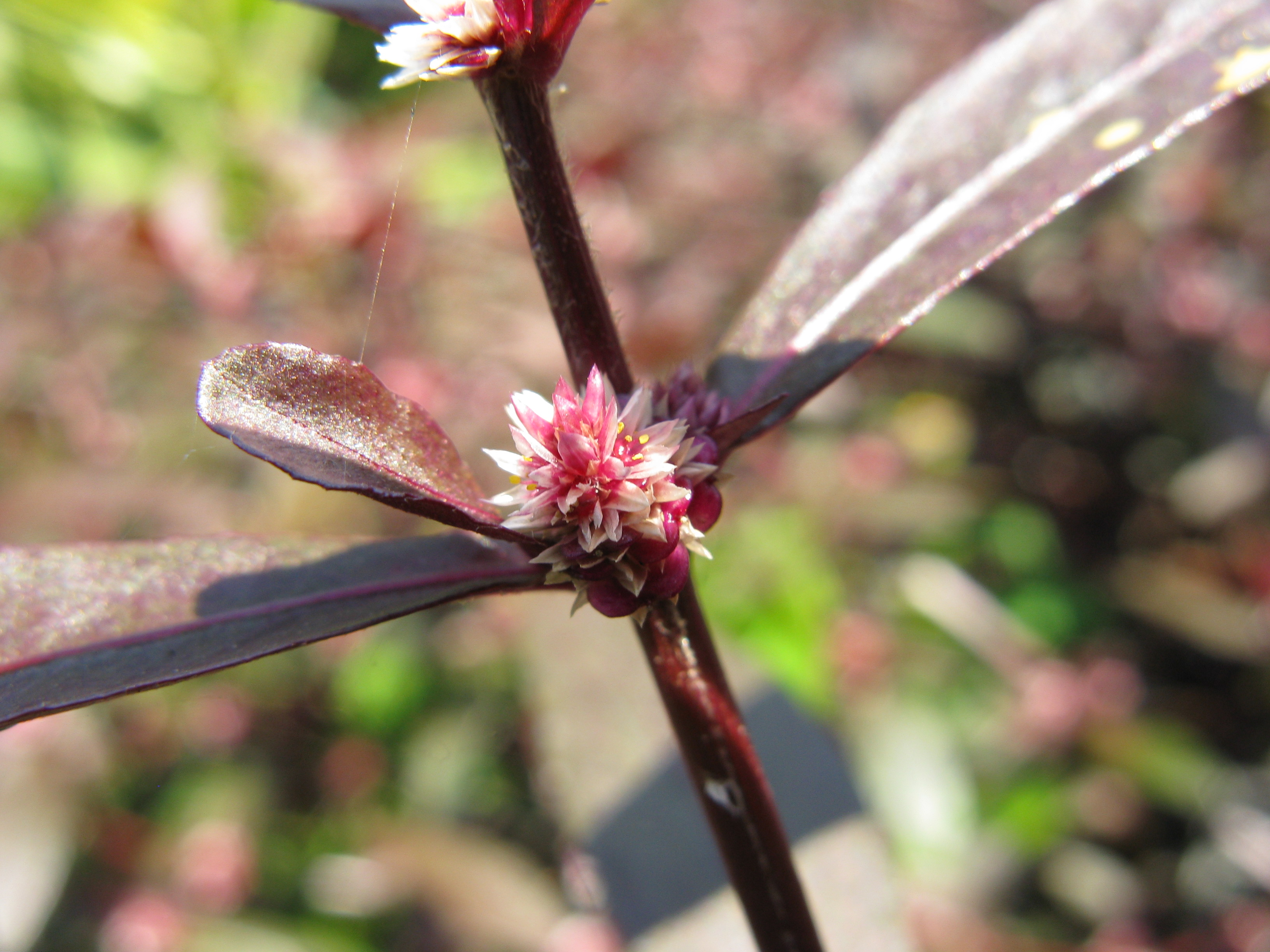
Alternanthera polygonoides

It is not yet clear how many species belong in the genus. Estimates range between 80 and 200. Plants of the World Online accepts 106 species.

As of April 2024, Plants of the World Online accepts the following species:

- Alternanthera albida (Moq.) Griseb.
- Alternanthera albosquarrosa Suess.
- Alternanthera albotomentosa Suess.
- Alternanthera altacruzensis Suess.
- Alternanthera angustifolia R.Br. – narrow-leaf joyweed
- Alternanthera aquatica (D.Parodi) Chodat – Hassler's alternanthera
- Alternanthera arequipensis Suess.
- Alternanthera areschougii R.E.Fr.
- Alternanthera axillaris (Willd.) DC.
- Alternanthera bahiensis Pedersen
- Alternanthera bettzickiana (Regel) G.Nicholson – calico-plant
- Alternanthera brasiliana (L.) Kuntze – Brazilian joyweed, ruby leaf
  - Alternanthera brasiliana var. villosa (Moq.) Kuntze (synonym Alternanthera dentata Stuchlík ex R.E.Fr.) – little ruby
- Alternanthera calcicola Standl.
- Alternanthera cana Suess.
- Alternanthera canescens Kunth
- Alternanthera caracasana Kunth – mat chaff-flower, washerwoman
- Alternanthera cinerella Suess.
- Alternanthera collina Pedersen
- Alternanthera congesta Suess. & O.Stützer
- Alternanthera cordobensis (Standl.) Standl.
- Alternanthera corymbiformis Eliasson
- Alternanthera costaricensis Kuntze
- Alternanthera crassifolia (Standl.) Alain
- Alternanthera decurrens J.C.Siqueira
- Alternanthera dendrotricha C.C.Towns.
- Alternanthera denticulata R.Br. – lesser joyweed
- Alternanthera dominii Schinz
- Alternanthera ebracteolata Sindhu Arya & V.S.A.Kumar
- Alternanthera echinocephala (Hook.f.) Christoph. – spiny-headed chaff flower, sea-urchin joyweed
- Alternanthera fasciculata Suess.
- Alternanthera fastigiata Suess.
- Alternanthera ficoidea (L.) P.Beauv. – parrot leaf
- Alternanthera filifolia (Hook.f.) J.T.Howell
- Alternanthera flava (L.) Mears
- Alternanthera flavescens Kunth – yellow joyweed
- Alternanthera flavicoma (Andersson) J.T.Howell
- Alternanthera flavida Suess.
- Alternanthera flosculosa J.T.Howell
- Alternanthera galapagensis (A.Stewart) J.T.Howell
- Alternanthera geniculata Urb.
- Alternanthera glaziovii R.E.Fr.
- Alternanthera grandis Eliasson
- Alternanthera halimifolia (Lam.) Standl. ex Pittier – West Indian joyweed
- Alternanthera helleri (B.L.Rob.) J.T.Howell
- Alternanthera herniarioides Beurl.
- Alternanthera hirtula (Mart.) R.E.Fr.
- Alternanthera inaccessa Pedersen
- Alternanthera indica Sindhu Arya, V.S.A.Kumar, Sánch.Pino & Iamonico
- Alternanthera ingramiana (Standl.) Schinz
- Alternanthera jacquinii (Schrad.) Alain
- Alternanthera januarensis J.C.Siqueira
- Alternanthera kanhae Vanzara, Katara & Nagar
- Alternanthera kurtzii Schinz ex Pedersen
- Alternanthera laguroides (Standl.) Standl.
- Alternanthera lanceolata (Benth.) Schinz
- Alternanthera laxa Suess.
- Alternanthera littoralis P.Beauv. – seaside joyweed
- Alternanthera lupulina Kunth
- Alternanthera macbridei Standl.
- Alternanthera martii (Moq.) R.E.Fr.
- Alternanthera micrantha R.E.Fr.
- Alternanthera microphylla R.E.Fr.
- Alternanthera minutiflora (Seub.) Suess.
- Alternanthera mollendoana Suess.
- Alternanthera multicaulis (Mart.) Kuntze
- Alternanthera nahui Heenan & de Lange
- Alternanthera nesiotes I.M.Johnst.
- Alternanthera nodiflora R.Br. – common joyweed
- Alternanthera obovata (M.Martens & Galeotti) Millsp.
- Alternanthera olivacea (Urb.) Urb.
- Alternanthera panamensis (Standl.) Standl.
- Alternanthera paronichyoides A.St.-Hil. – smooth joyweed
- Alternanthera pennelliana Mears ex Pedersen
- Alternanthera peruviana (Moq.) Suess.
- Alternanthera philippo-coburgii (Zahlbr. ex Wawra) Suess.
- Alternanthera philoxeroides (Mart.) Griseb. – alligator weed
- Alternanthera porrigens (Jacq.) Kuntze
- Alternanthera praelonga A.St.-Hil.
- Alternanthera puberula (Mart.) D.Dietr.
- Alternanthera pubiflora (Benth.) Kuntze
- Alternanthera pulchella Kunth
- Alternanthera pulverulenta Moq.
- Alternanthera pumila O.Stützer
- Alternanthera pungens Kunth
- Alternanthera pycnantha (Benth.) Standl.
- Alternanthera raimondii Suess.
- Alternanthera regelii (Seub.) Schinz
- Alternanthera reineckii Briq.
- Alternanthera robinsonii Suess.
- Alternanthera rufa (Mart.) D.Dietr.
- Alternanthera rugulosa (B.L.Rob.) J.T.Howell
- Alternanthera serpens Pedersen
- Alternanthera serpyllifolia (Poir.) Urb.
- Alternanthera sessilis (L.) DC. – rabbit-meat, sessile joyweed, downy joyweed, hairy joyweed
- Alternanthera snodgrassii (B.L.Rob.) J.T.Howell
- Alternanthera spinosa (Hornem.) Schult.
- Alternanthera stellata (S.Watson) Uline & W.L.Bray
- Alternanthera stenophylla (Standl.) Standl.
- Alternanthera suessenguthii Covas
- Alternanthera tetramera R.E.Fr.
- Alternanthera tomentosa (Moq.) Schinz
- Alternanthera tubulosa Suess.
- Alternanthera vestita (Andersson) J.T.Howell
- Alternanthera villosa Kunth

=== Formerly placed here ===
- Gomphrena subscaposa (Hook.f.) T.Ortuño & Borsch (as Alternanthera subscaposa Hook.f)

== Ecology ==
Many species have been reported as noxious weeds, including A. angustifolia, A. caracasana, A. denticulata, A. nana, A. nodiflora, A. paronychioides, A. philoxeroides, A. sessilis, A. tenella, and A. triandra. The most important species is alligator weed (A. philoxeroides), a South American aquatic plant that has spread to other continents. It is a weed of many kinds of agricultural crops, it is an invasive species that degrades native habitat, and its dense mats of vegetation clog waterways, slowing shipping and increasing flooding. Alternanthera plants are known to produce allelopathic compounds that injure other plants, including crops.

Biological pest control agents now in use to reduce alligator weed infestations include the alligator weed flea beetle (Agasicles hygrophila), the alligator weed thrips (Amynothrips andersoni), and the alligator weed stem borer (Arcola malloi).

== Uses ==
A. philoxeroides and A. sessilis are eaten as vegetables in parts of Asia.

Some Alternanthera are used as ornamental plants.
