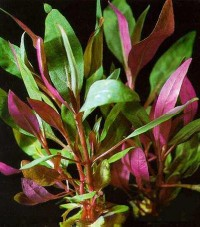

Scientific classification
- Kingdom: Plantae
- Clade: Tracheophytes
- Clade: Angiosperms
- Clade: Eudicots
- Order: Caryophyllales
- Family: Amaranthaceae
- Genus: Alternanthera
- Species: A. reineckii

Binomial name
- Alternanthera reineckii Briq.

Synonyms
- Alternanthera cardinalis Telanthera osiris Alternanthera rosaefolia

= Alternanthera reineckii =

Species of aquatic plant

Alternanthera reineckii is a species of aquatic plant in the family Amaranthaceae known as water hedge. Several cultivars are used as ornamental plants in aquaria. It is native to South America.

The species populates submerged and semi-aquatic habitats such as marshes, stream banks, and ponds. It grows up to 30cm tall.
