= Alternanthera nesiotes =

Conservation status
- Endangered (IUCN 3.1)

Scientific classification
- Kingdom: Plantae
- Clade: Tracheophytes
- Clade: Angiosperms
- Clade: Eudicots
- Order: Caryophyllales
- Family: Amaranthaceae
- Genus: Alternanthera
- Species: A. nesiotes

Binomial name
- Alternanthera nesiotes I.M.Johnst.

Species of flowering plant

Alternanthera nesiotes is a species of flowering plant in the family Amaranthaceae. It is endemic to the Galápagos Islands, where it is limited to Floreana Island. There are five subpopulations which are susceptible to habitat degradation due to invasive species of plants and animals.
