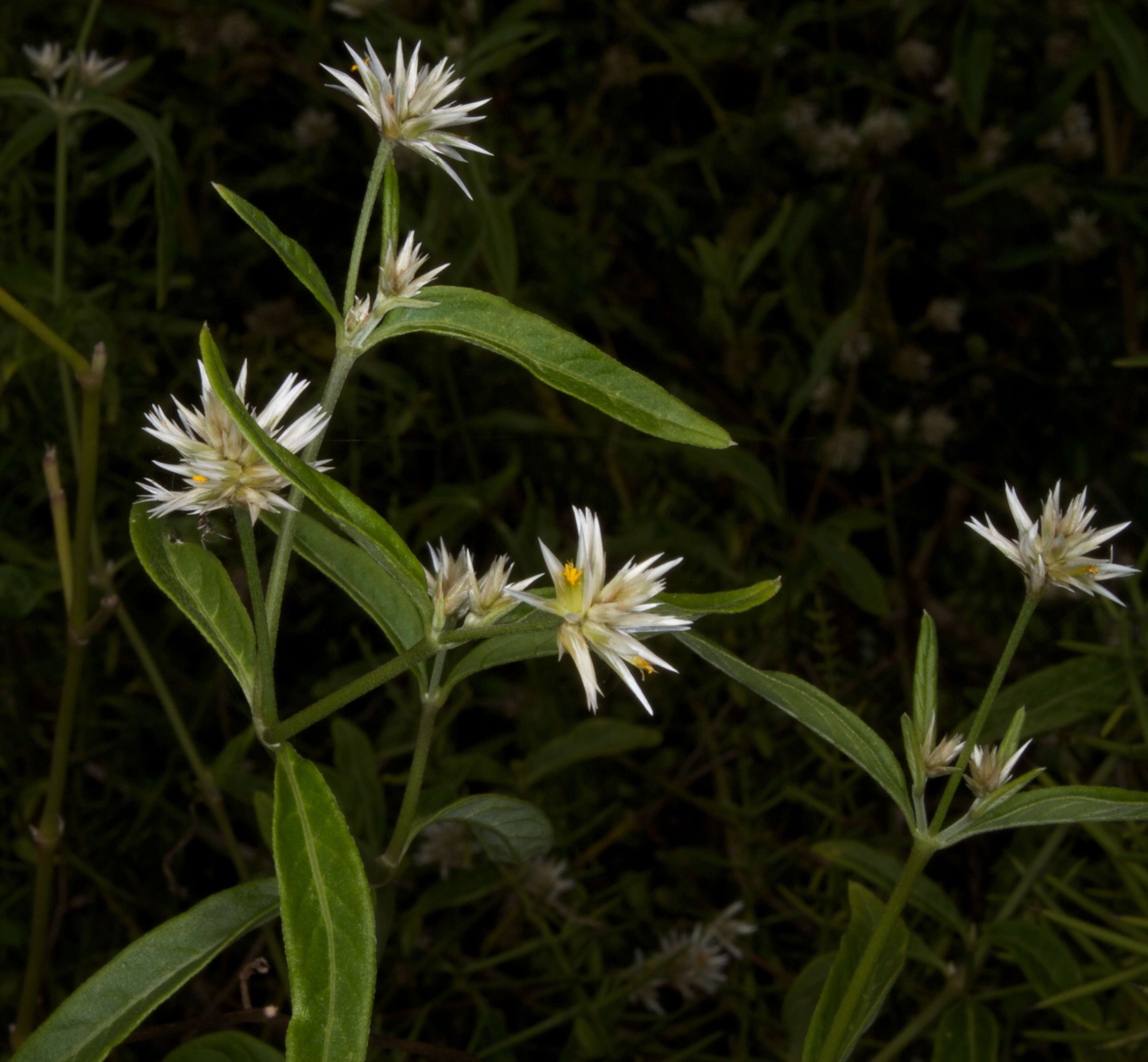

Scientific classification
- Kingdom: Plantae
- Clade: Tracheophytes
- Clade: Angiosperms
- Clade: Eudicots
- Order: Caryophyllales
- Family: Amaranthaceae
- Genus: Alternanthera
- Species: A. echinocephala

Binomial name
- Alternanthera echinocephala (Hook f.) Christoph.

Synonyms
- Brandesia echinocephala Hook. f.

= Alternanthera echinocephala =

Species of plant

Alternanthera echinocephala, known as spiny-headed chaff flower, is a shrubby plant in the family Amaranthaceae native to the Galápagos Islands, mainland Ecuador, and Peru. Its relatively large spiny "heads" of flowers distinguish it from other species of Alternanthera found in the Galápagos.

== Description ==
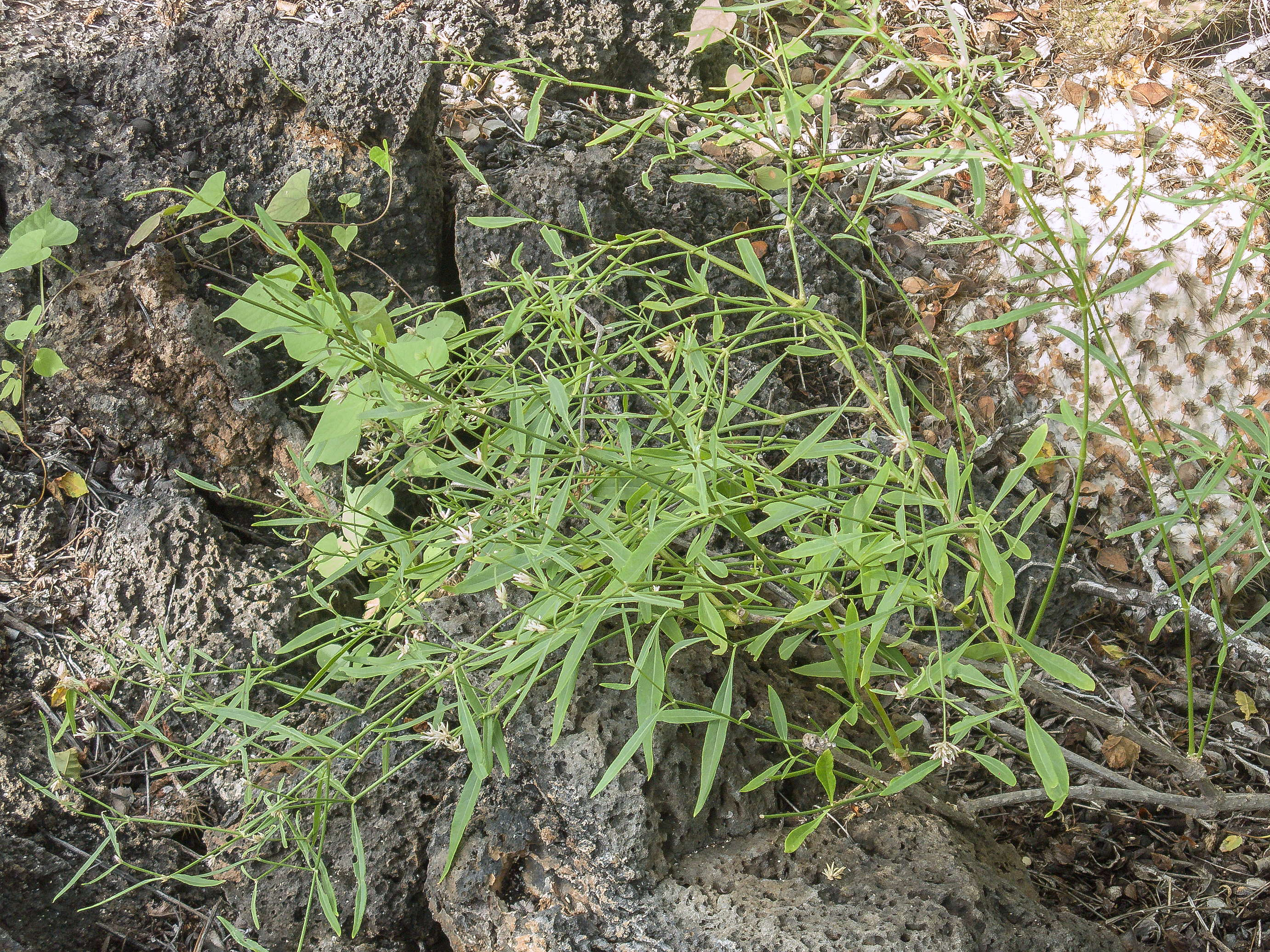
Showing habit; growing close to the sea on Santa Cruz Island, Galápagos

Alternanthera echinocephala is a much-branched shrub up to 2 m (7 ft) tall. Its leaves are arranged oppositely and are narrow and pointed (lanceolate) with untoothed margins, 7–9 cm (2.8–3.5 in) long. The flowers are grouped into somewhat rounded spikes ("heads") about 10–15 mm (0.4–0.6 in) across. Each flower has one large and two small bracts below it, which form the most conspicuous part of the flower head. The bracts are greenish-white, sometimes with pinkish tones. The small sepals are similar in colour, only 5–10 mm (0.2–0.4 in) long. The flowers have no petals and five stamens.

Thirteen species of Alternanthera are found in the Galápagos Islands, of which six are endemics; A. echinocephala is said to be easy to distinguish based on its relatively large flower heads with their spiny appearance.

== Taxonomy ==
The species was first described in 1847, from the Galápagos Islands, by Joseph Dalton Hooker as Brandesia echinocephala. Paul Carpenter Standley transferred it to the genus Alternanthera in 1932. The specific epithet echinocephala is derived from the Greek words echinos, hedgehog or sea urchin, hence meaning "spiny", and cephalos, here meaning "headed".

== Distribution and habitat ==
As of June 2015, Tropicos shows the species to be distributed in the Galápagos Islands and the coast of mainland Ecuador. McMullen (1999) says that it is also known from Peru. Within the Galápagos, it is known from the islands of Española, Floreana, Isabela, Pinta, Pinzón, San Cristóbal, Santa Fe and Santiago, as well as from some of their neighbouring islets.

It is a plant of the arid lowland regions of the Galápagos.
