= Alternanthera areschougii =

Conservation status
- Vulnerable (IUCN 3.1)

Scientific classification
- Kingdom: Plantae
- Clade: Tracheophytes
- Clade: Angiosperms
- Clade: Eudicots
- Order: Caryophyllales
- Family: Amaranthaceae
- Genus: Alternanthera
- Species: A. areschougii

Binomial name
- Alternanthera areschougii R.E.Fr.

Synonyms
- Telanthera pulchella F.Aresch.

Species of flowering plant

Alternanthera areschougii is a species of plant in the family Amaranthaceae. It is endemic to Ecuador. Its natural habitats are subtropical or tropical dry forests and subtropical or tropical dry shrubland. It is threatened by habitat loss.
