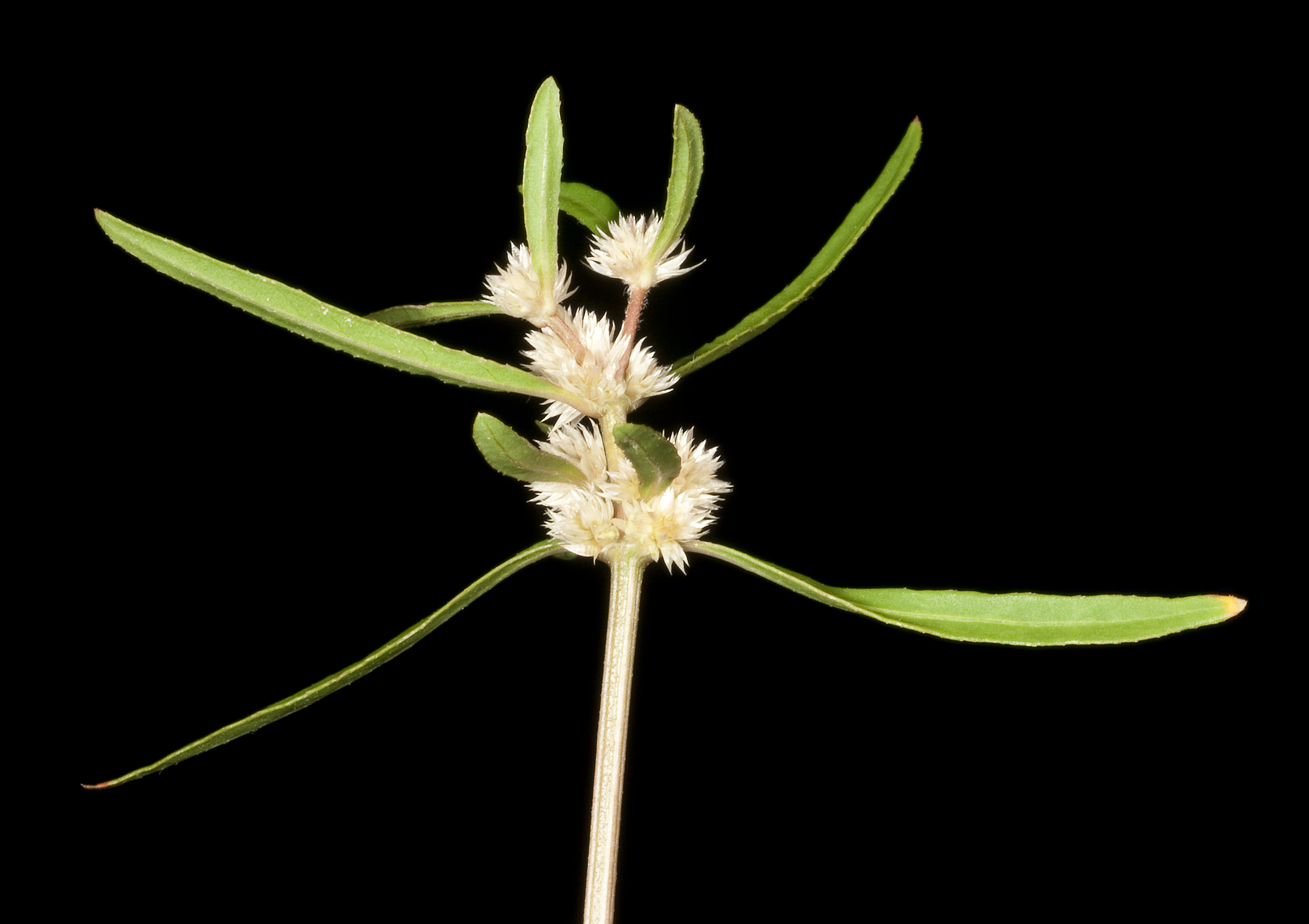

Scientific classification
- Kingdom: Plantae
- Clade: Tracheophytes
- Clade: Angiosperms
- Clade: Eudicots
- Order: Caryophyllales
- Family: Amaranthaceae
- Genus: Alternanthera
- Species: A. denticulata

Binomial name
- Alternanthera denticulata R.Br.

Synonyms
- Alternanthera denticulata var. micrantha Benth. Alternanthera denticulata var. uliginosa Domin; Alternanthera micrantha (Benth.) Domin; Alternanthera triandra var. denticulata (R.Br.) Maiden & Betche

= Alternanthera denticulata =

Species of plant

Alternanthera denticulata (common name lesser joyweed) is a small prostrate white-flowering herb in the Amaranthaceae family. It is native to all states and territories of Australia, New Guinea, and the North Island of New Zealand. It is also one of the food plants of the varied eggfly, Hypolimnas bolina nerina.

The species was first described in 1810 by Robert Brown.

== Description ==
Alternanthera denticulata is a prostrate to erect perennial herb, whose stems root at the nodes. The stems are green flushed pink, and sparsely hairy to being without a covering. The nodes are tomentose (that is, covered with dense intertwined hairs). The leaves are (20-)30-80 by 6–12 mm, and a light green, yellow green or flushed pink, with both the midrib and lateral veins being pink. The leaf margins are finely toothed, or entire.

== Habitat and flowering ==
In Western Australia, it grows on both sand and clay soils, on the banks of creeks, rivers and swamps, flowering from April to August. On the North Island of New Zealand, it is found on coastal and lowland wetlands, lake margins and other damp ground, flowering from January to December.

== Conservation status ==
In New Zealand, it has been assessed by the Department of Conservation as "Data Poor" but "Secure Overseas".
