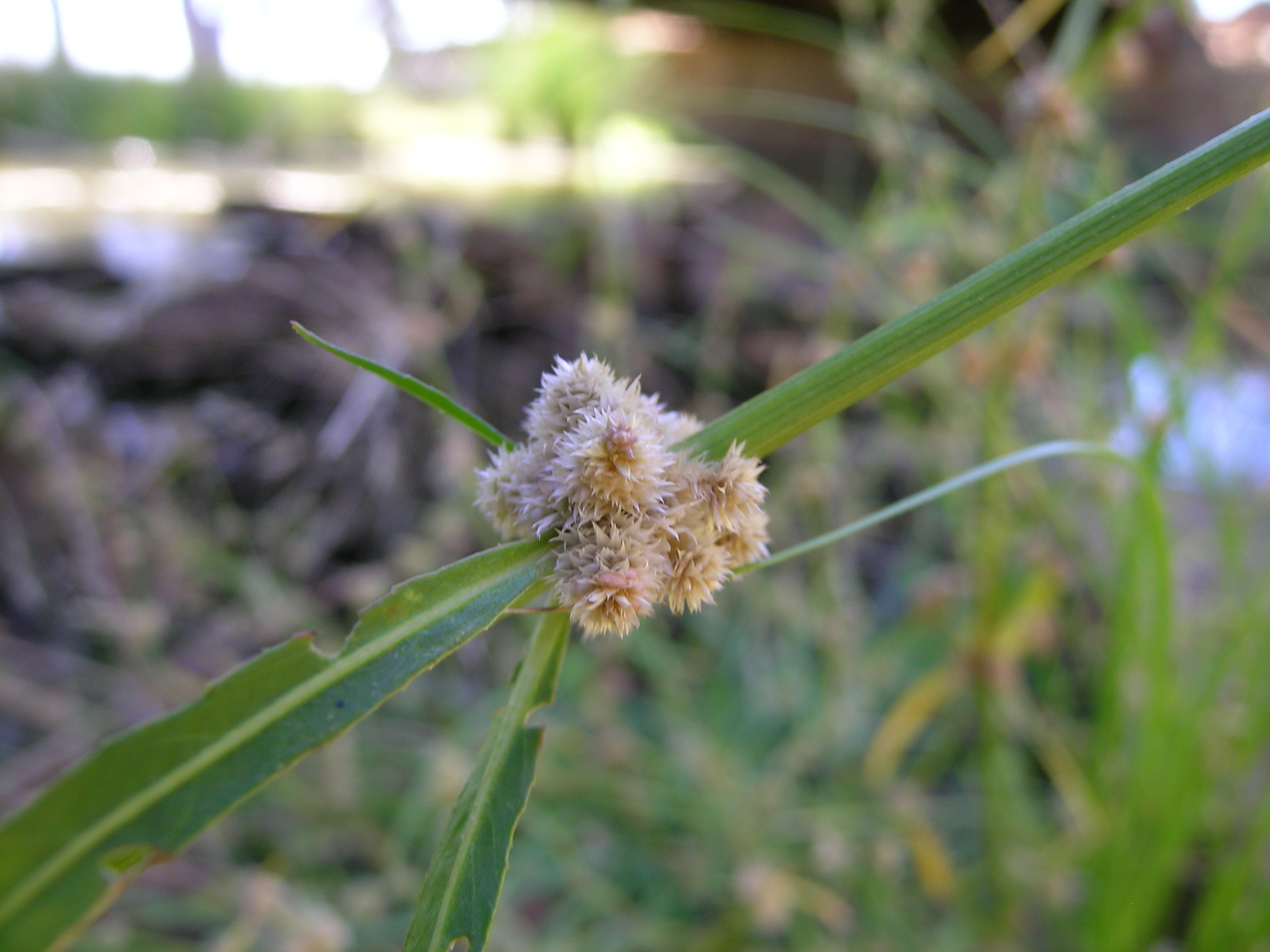

Scientific classification
- Kingdom: Plantae
- Clade: Tracheophytes
- Clade: Angiosperms
- Clade: Eudicots
- Order: Caryophyllales
- Family: Amaranthaceae
- Genus: Alternanthera
- Species: A. nodiflora

Binomial name
- Alternanthera nodiflora R.Br.

Synonyms
- Alternanthera nodiflora var. linearifolia Moq. Alternanthera nodiflora R.Br. var. nodiflora Alternanthera triandra var. nodiflora (R.Br.) Maiden & Betche

= Alternanthera nodiflora =

Species of flowering plant

Alternanthera nodiflora (common name common joyweed) is a species of flowering plant in the family Amaranthaceae. It is endemic to Australia, growing in all mainland states. It is naturalised in Tasmania, over much of Africa, in Japan, and in Myanmar.

== Description ==
Alternanthera nodiflora is an erect annual herb. The branches are almost without a covering but the nodes are covered with dense intertwined hairs, and there are two lines of hairs along the branches. The leaves, too, are almost without a covering and are linear, 2-8 cm long and have smooth margins. The inflorescences are globular, and often clustered. The fruit is less than half the length of the perianth. The style is very short.

== Taxonomy and naming ==
It was first described by Robert Brown in 1810. The type specimen is BM001015779 (collected on the east coast of Australia); Isotypes are E00279928 (collected at Broadsound), P00622600 (all three collected by Brown). The name is accepted by the Council of Heads of Australasian Herbaria, by Plants of the World online, but is considered a synonym of Alternanthera sessilis by Catalogue of Life.

The specific epithet, nodiflora, derives from the Latin, nodus,( "knot" or "node") and flos, floris ("flower") to give an adjective describing the plant as having flowers arranged in a knot-shaped inflorescence or flowering at the nodes.

== Gallery ==
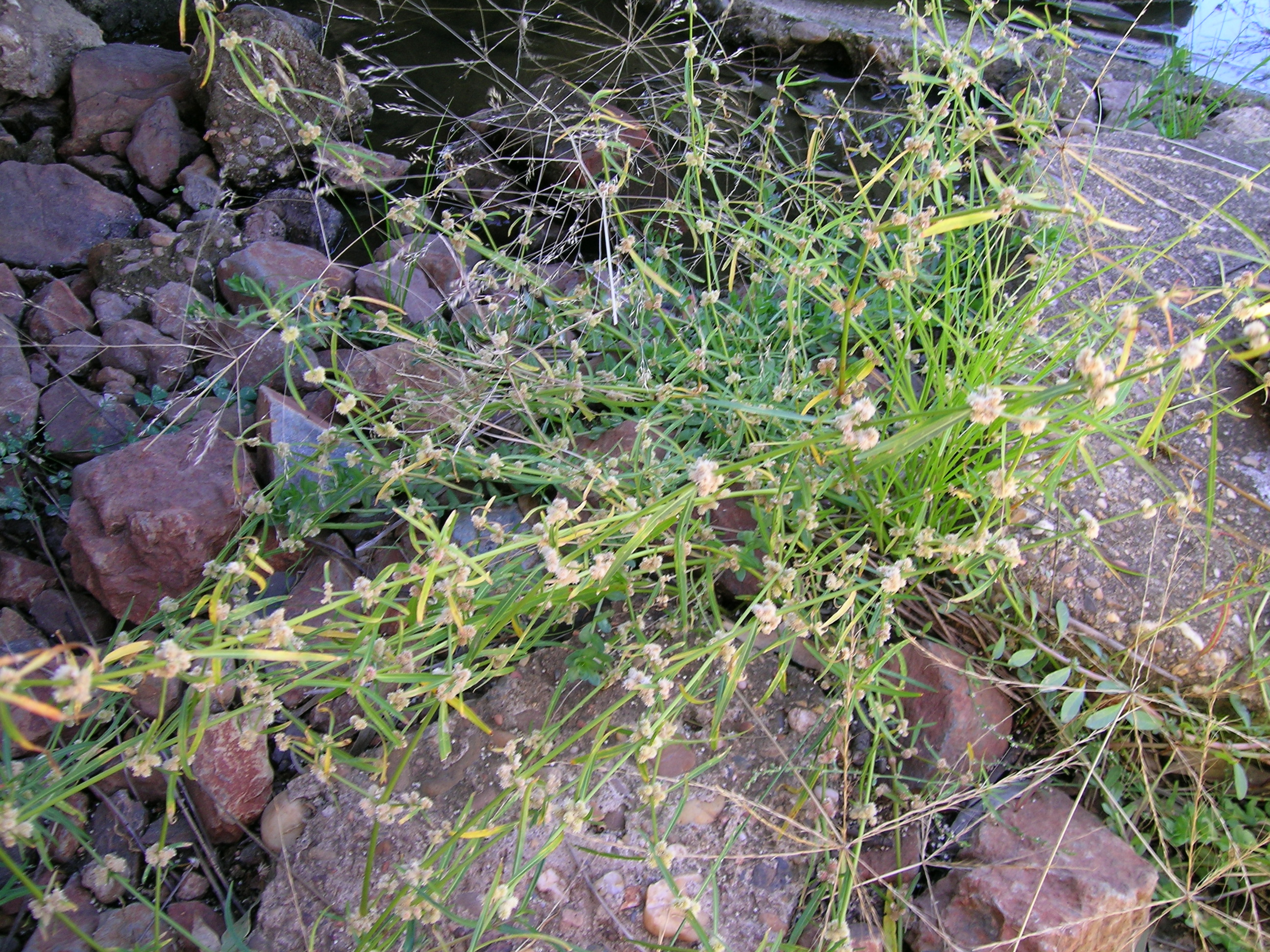

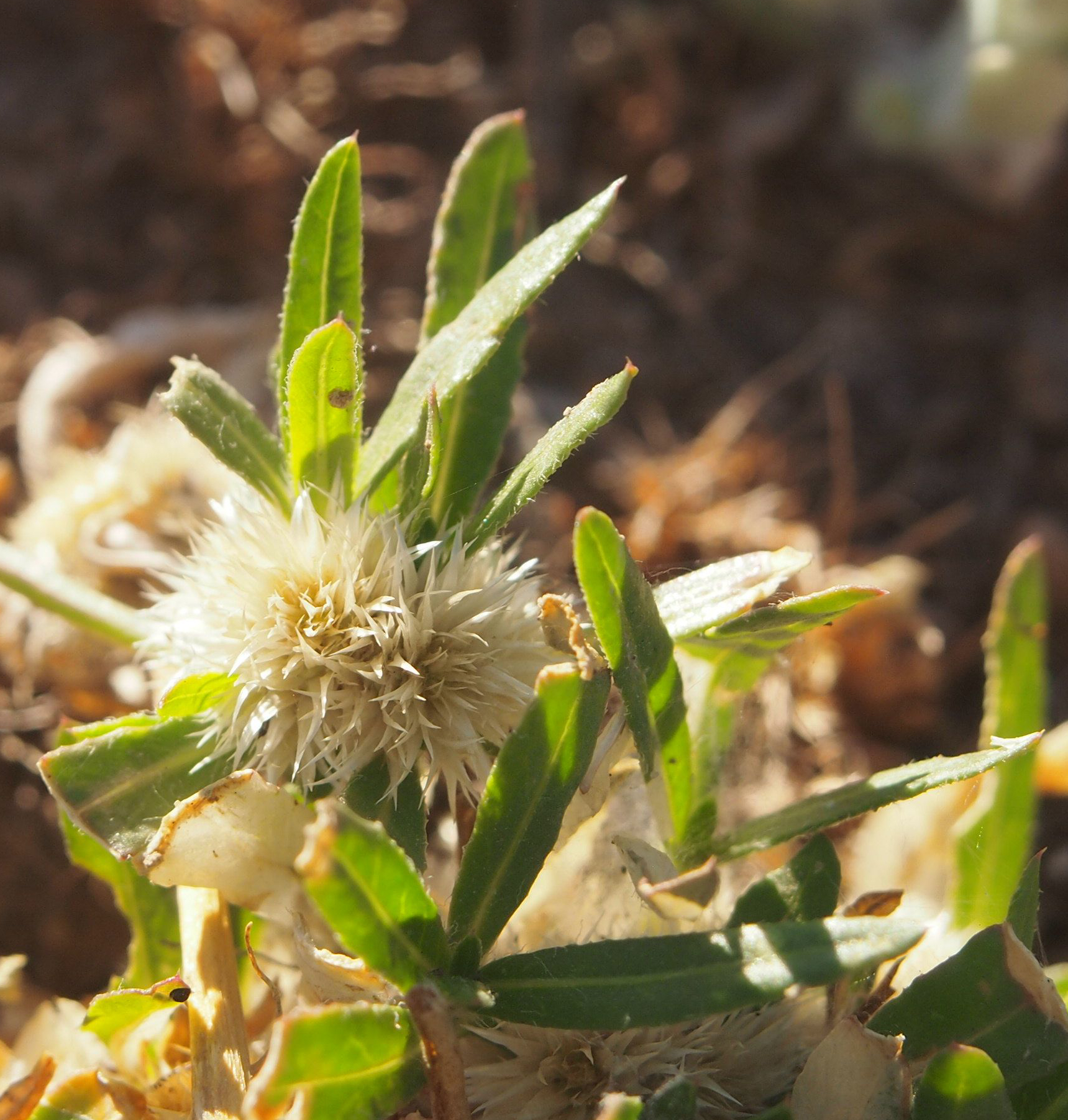

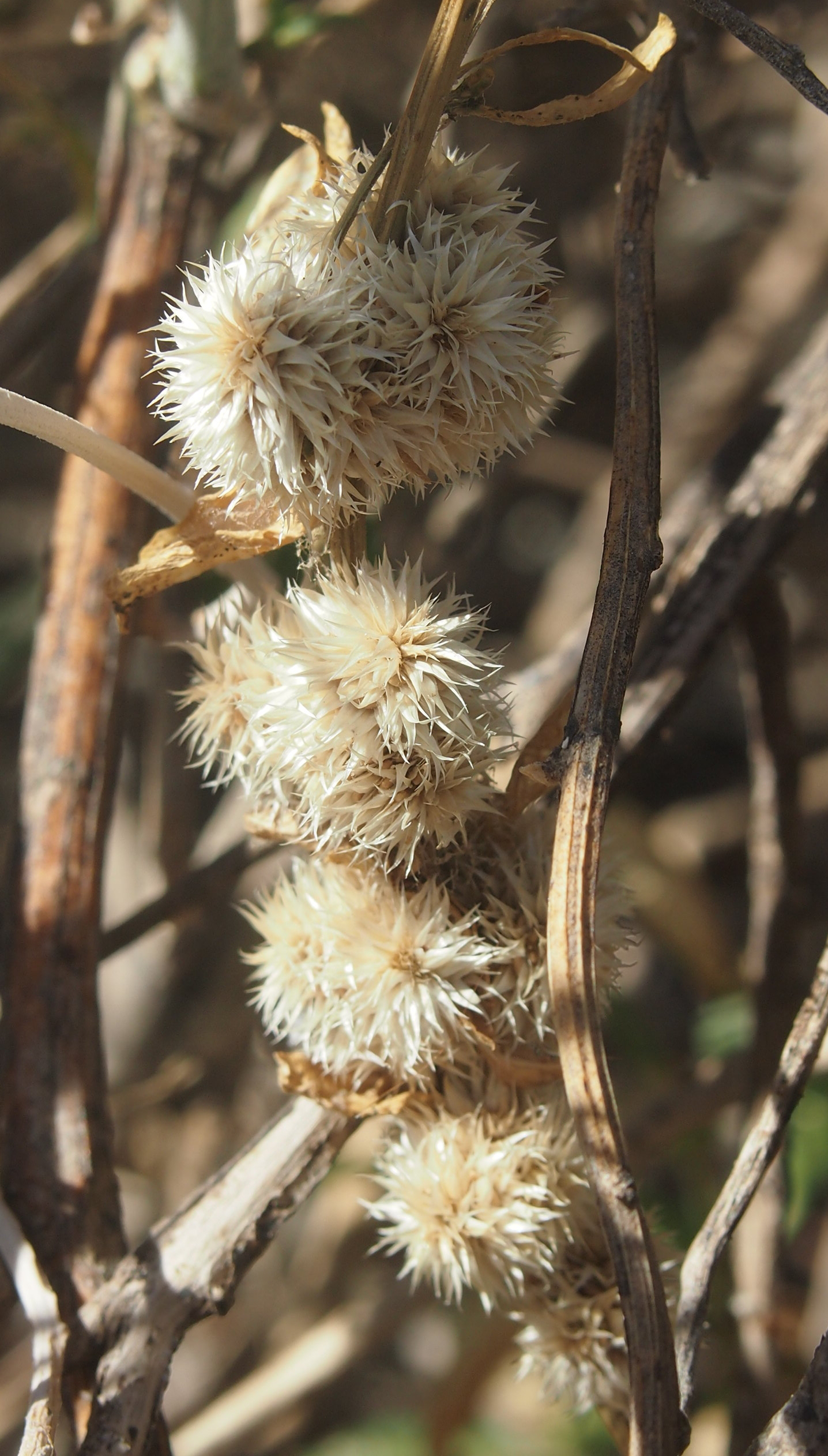
