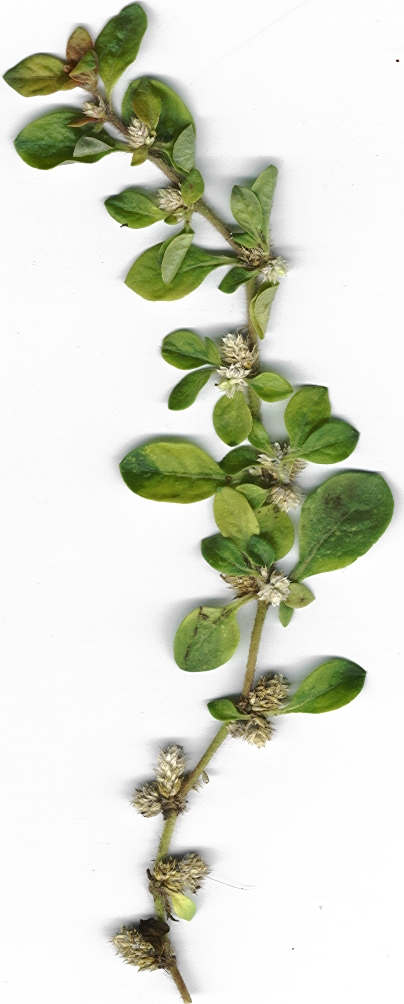

Scientific classification
- Kingdom: Plantae
- Clade: Tracheophytes
- Clade: Angiosperms
- Clade: Eudicots
- Order: Caryophyllales
- Family: Amaranthaceae
- Genus: Alternanthera
- Species: A. caracasana

Binomial name
- Alternanthera caracasana Kunth

Synonyms
- Alternanthera peploides

= Alternanthera caracasana =

Species of flowering plant

Alternanthera caracasana is a species of flowering plant in the family Amaranthaceae known by the common names khakiweed, washerwoman and mat chaff flower. It is native to Central and South America but is well-known elsewhere as a noxious weed. It is naturalized in some areas and invasive in others and can be found across the southern half of the United States, Australia (where many people are unaware it is not native), Spain and parts of Africa. The plant has long, prostrate stems covered in small leaves which vary in shape from diamond to rounded. It grows from a rhizome and often roots from its lower nodes. Each spike inflorescence is under a centimeter wide and is covered in tiny stiff white flowers. This is a tough weed of lots, roads, railroad tracks, cleared areas, and other places that are rough, sandy, and often well-traveled.

It is often confused with khaki burr, which it is related to, but it sports masses of sharp V-shaped prickles that are easily detached and embed themselves in the feet and skin.

== Gallery ==
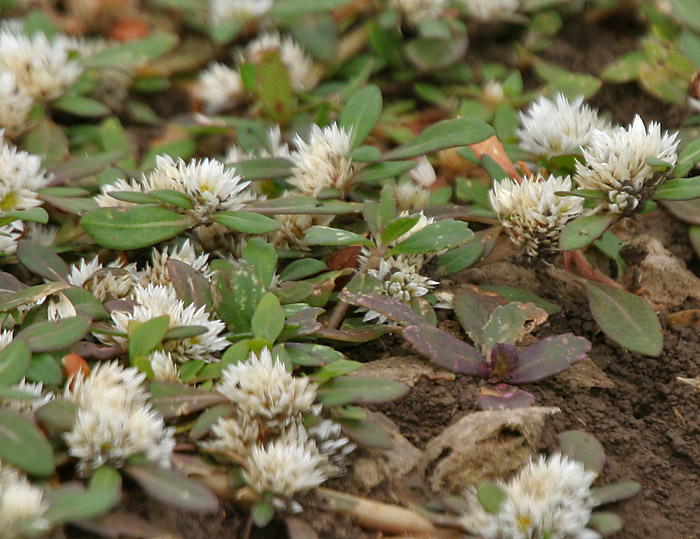
In Hyderabad, India

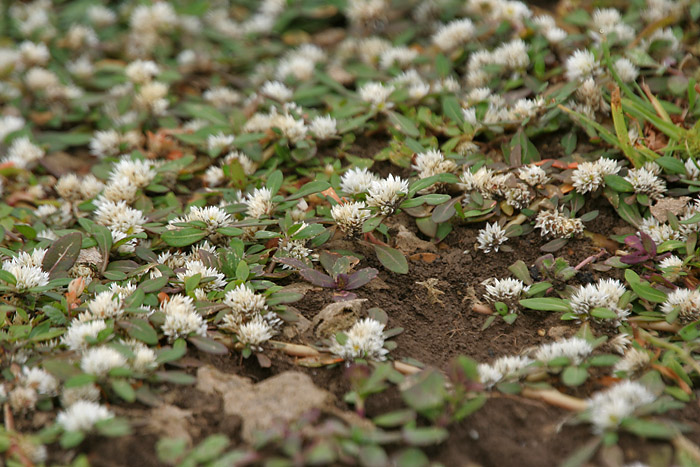
In Hyderabad

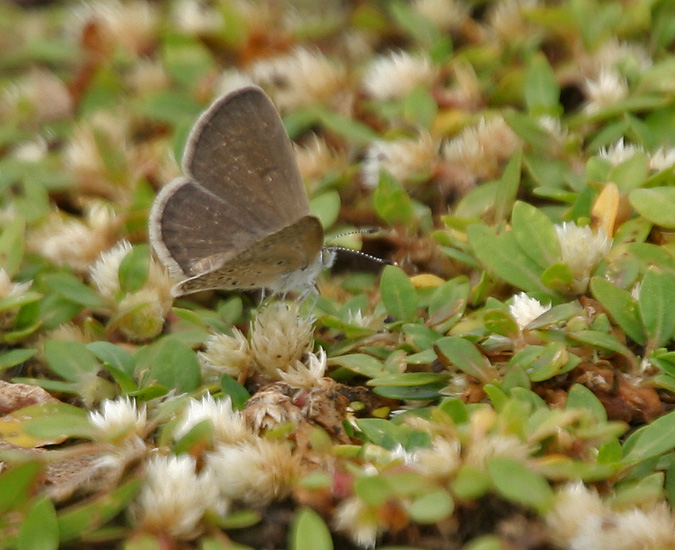
With a dark grass blue (Zizeeria karsandra) in Hyderabad
