= Alternanthera corymbiformis =

Conservation status
- Vulnerable (IUCN 3.1)

Scientific classification
- Kingdom: Plantae
- Clade: Tracheophytes
- Clade: Angiosperms
- Clade: Eudicots
- Order: Caryophyllales
- Family: Amaranthaceae
- Genus: Alternanthera
- Species: A. corymbiformis

Binomial name
- Alternanthera corymbiformis Eliasson

Species of flowering plant

Alternanthera corymbiformis is a species of plant in the family Amaranthaceae. It is endemic to Ecuador. Its natural habitats are subtropical or tropical moist montane forests and subtropical or tropical dry shrubland. It is threatened by habitat loss.
