= Alternanthera grandis =

Conservation status
- Vulnerable (IUCN 3.1)

Scientific classification
- Kingdom: Plantae
- Clade: Tracheophytes
- Clade: Angiosperms
- Clade: Eudicots
- Order: Caryophyllales
- Family: Amaranthaceae
- Genus: Alternanthera
- Species: A. grandis

Binomial name
- Alternanthera grandis Eliasson

Species of flowering plant

Alternanthera grandis is a species of plant in the family Amaranthaceae. It is endemic to Ecuador. Its natural habitats are:

- Subtropical or tropical dry forests
- Subtropical or tropical dry shrubland and
- Subtropical or tropical high-altitude grassland.

It is threatened by habitat loss.
