= Alternanthera angustifolia =

Scientific classification
- Kingdom: Plantae
- Clade: Tracheophytes
- Clade: Angiosperms
- Clade: Eudicots
- Order: Caryophyllales
- Family: Amaranthaceae
- Genus: Alternanthera
- Species: A. angustifolia

Binomial name
- Alternanthera angustifolia R.Br.

Species of flowering plant

Alternanthera angustifolia (narrow-leaf joyweed) is a small herb in family Amaranthaceae found widely in inland Australia from northern Western Australia, the Northern Territory, South Australia, New South Wales to Queensland.

It is a prostrate (or decumbent) annual herb, growing from 2 cm to 30 cm high, on sandy soils on creek and river banks. Its small white flowers may be seen from April to August.

Alternanthera angustifolia was first described in 1810 by Robert Brown.
