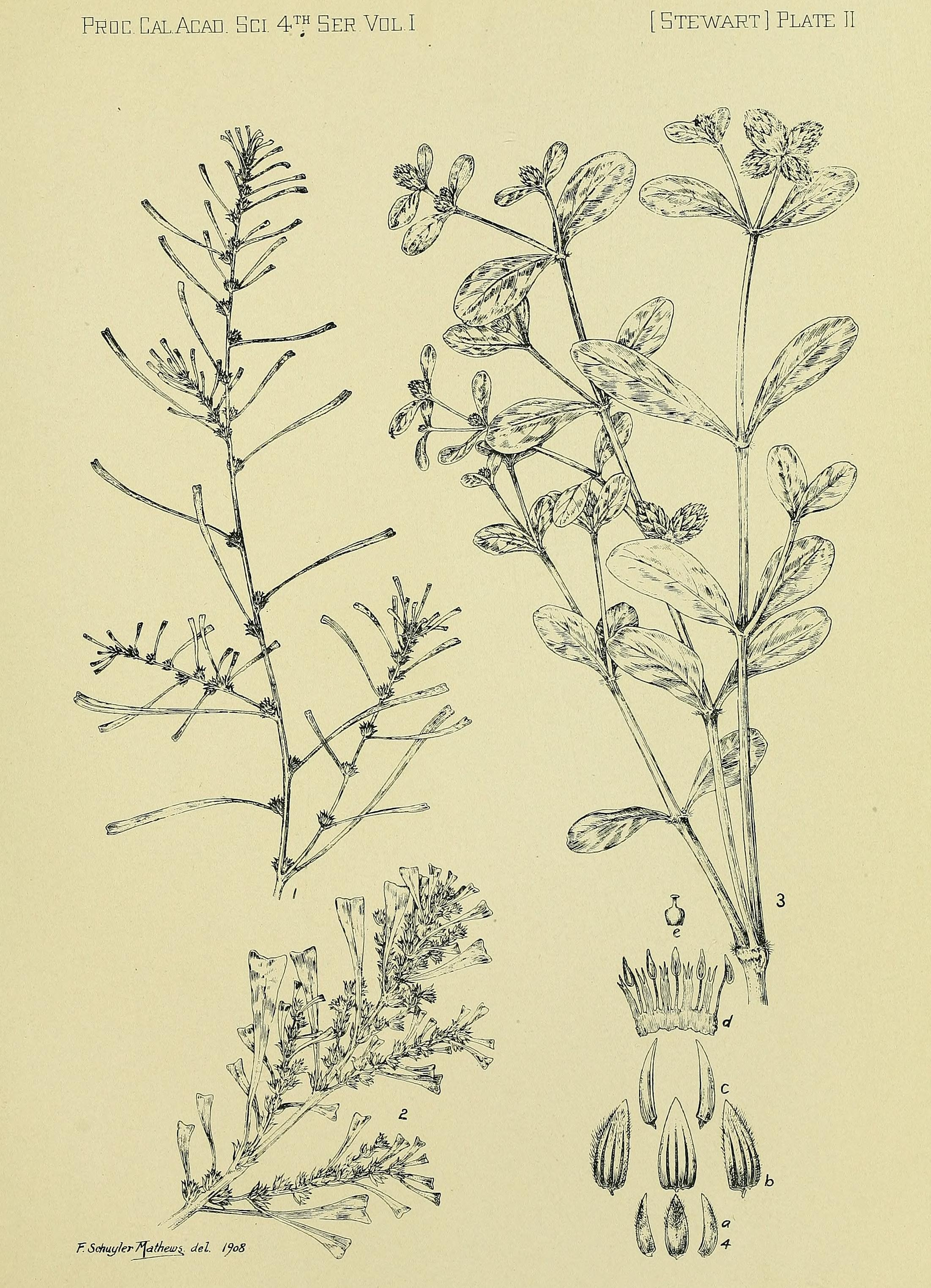

Conservation status
- Vulnerable (IUCN 2.3)

Scientific classification
- Kingdom: Plantae
- Clade: Tracheophytes
- Clade: Angiosperms
- Clade: Eudicots
- Order: Caryophyllales
- Family: Amaranthaceae
- Genus: Alternanthera
- Species: A. galapagensis

Binomial name
- Alternanthera galapagensis (A.Stewart) J.T. Howell

= Alternanthera galapagensis =

Species of flowering plant

Alternanthera galapagensis is a species of plant in the family Amaranthaceae. It is endemic to the Galapagos.
