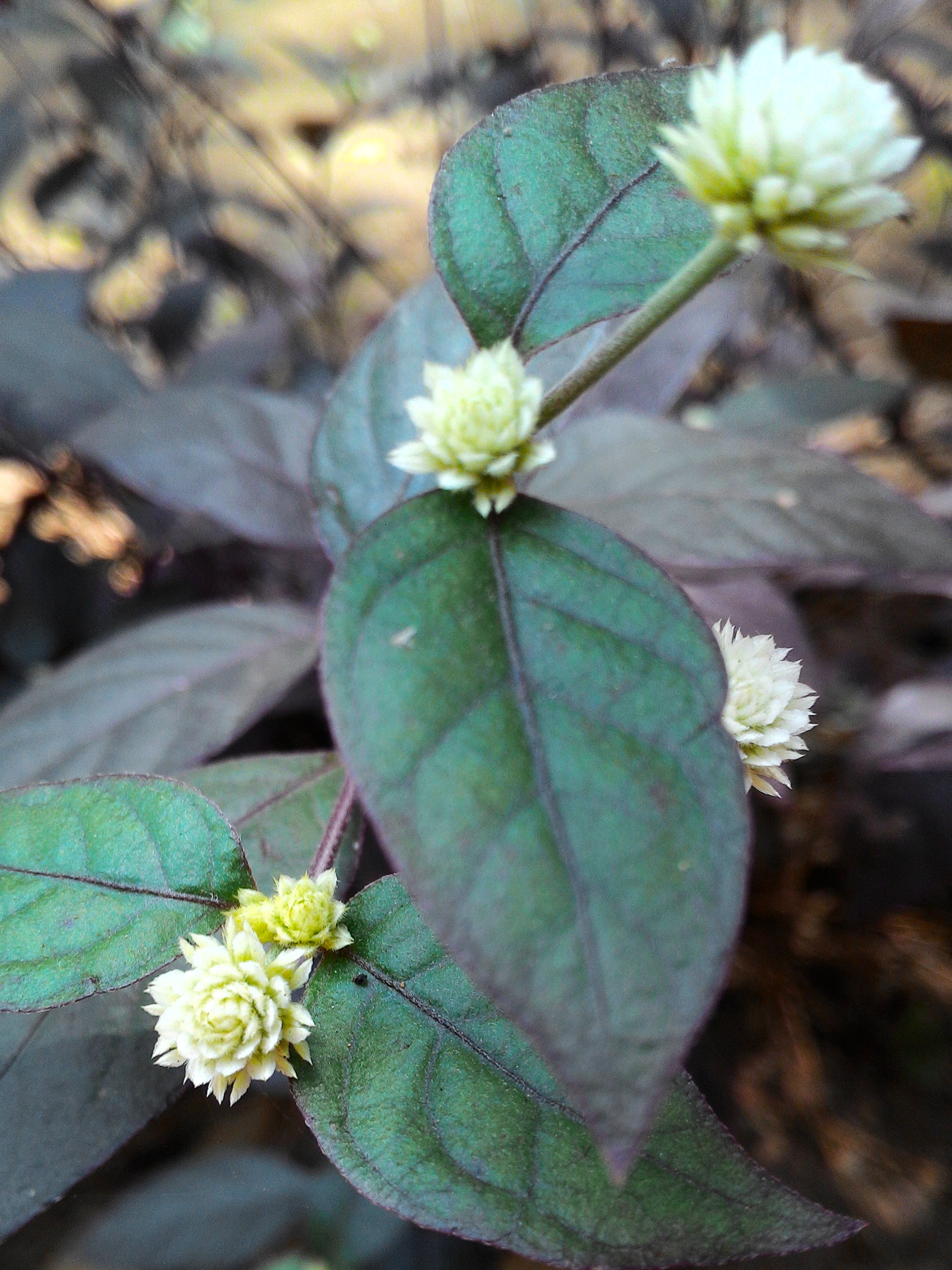

Scientific classification
- Kingdom: Plantae
- Clade: Tracheophytes
- Clade: Angiosperms
- Clade: Eudicots
- Order: Caryophyllales
- Family: Amaranthaceae
- Genus: Alternanthera
- Species: A. bettzickiana

Binomial name
- Alternanthera bettzickiana (Regel) G.Nicholson

Synonyms
- Alternanthera amoena

= Alternanthera bettzickiana =

Species of flowering plant

Alternanthera bettzickiana, commonly known as calico-plant, is a species of flowering plant in the family Amaranthaceae. It is commonly used as an ornamental edging plant. Native to South America, its cultivar 'Red' is similar in appearance to some of the Alternanthera dentata and Alternanthera brasiliana varieties.

== Description ==
This perennial herb is between 20 and 50 cm tall and has variegated leaves. Its branched stems have a circular section towards the base and quadrangular towards the summit. They present some hairs at the nodes and the apex, as well as at the level of the short petioles (1 to 4 mm long). The leaf blade is 1 to 6 mm long and 0.5 to 2 mm wide. It is green, red or green tinged with red or yellow. Its shape is oval, sometimes a little oblong or spatulate. It is not flat but slightly wavy.

Flowering takes place at the end of the summer. The inflorescences are terminal or axillary; there are between 2 and 5 per flower stalk. The bracts measure 1.5 to 3 mm in length and are acuminate. The corolla and calyx are white tepals, the outermost being longer (3 or 4 mm) and hairy than the internal ones. There are 5 stamens with linear anthers. The ovary is smooth, very short style.

== Cultivation ==
It is particularly popular in China, where it is "cultivated in nearly all the large cities". Thriving in full sun to partial shade, the plant has been naturalised in southeastern Queensland, Australia, where it grows in woodlands but can also be found along roads through rainforest. The plant is also harvested from the wild for its edible leaves, which may aid anaemic children.

== Gallery ==
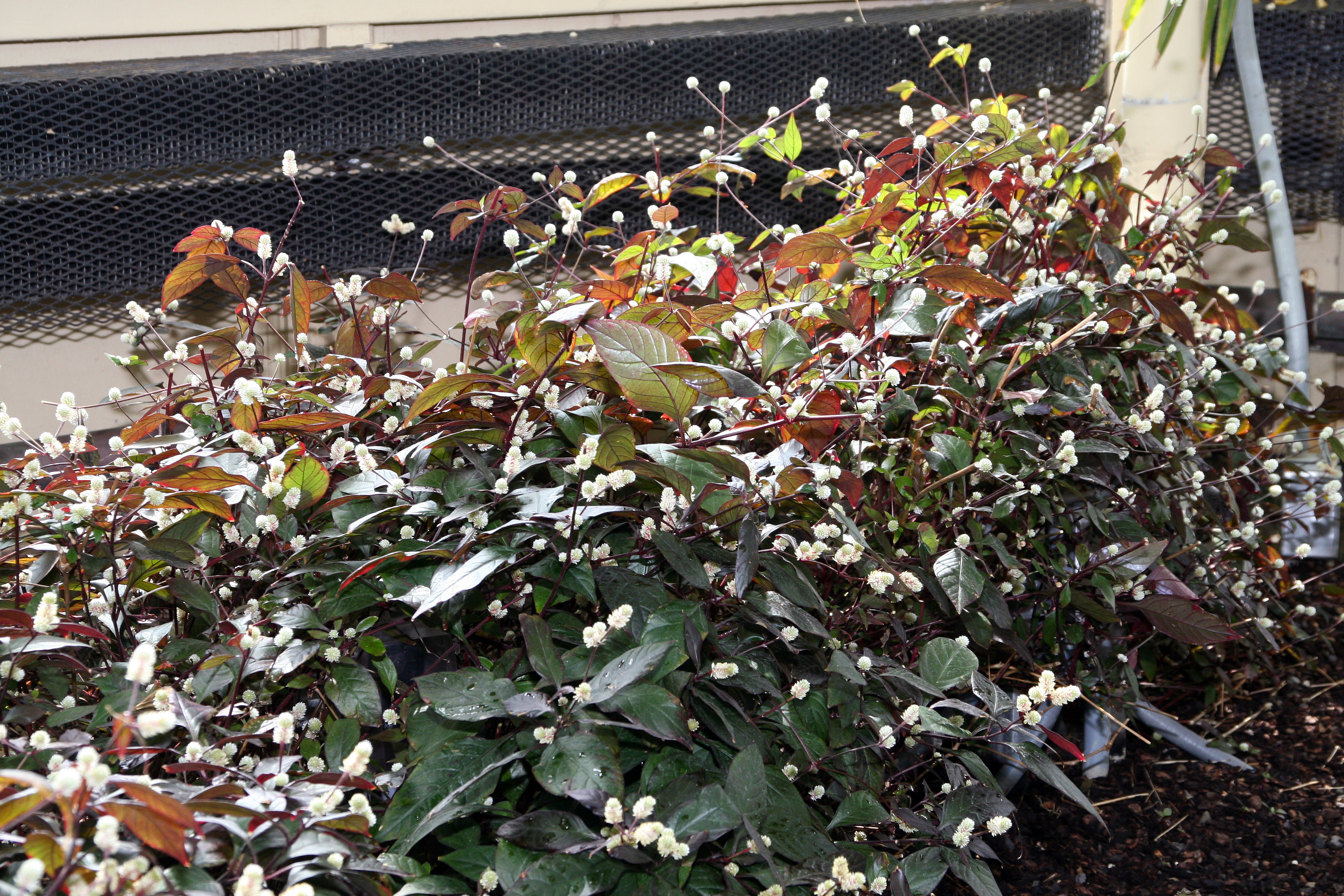
Shrubby setting

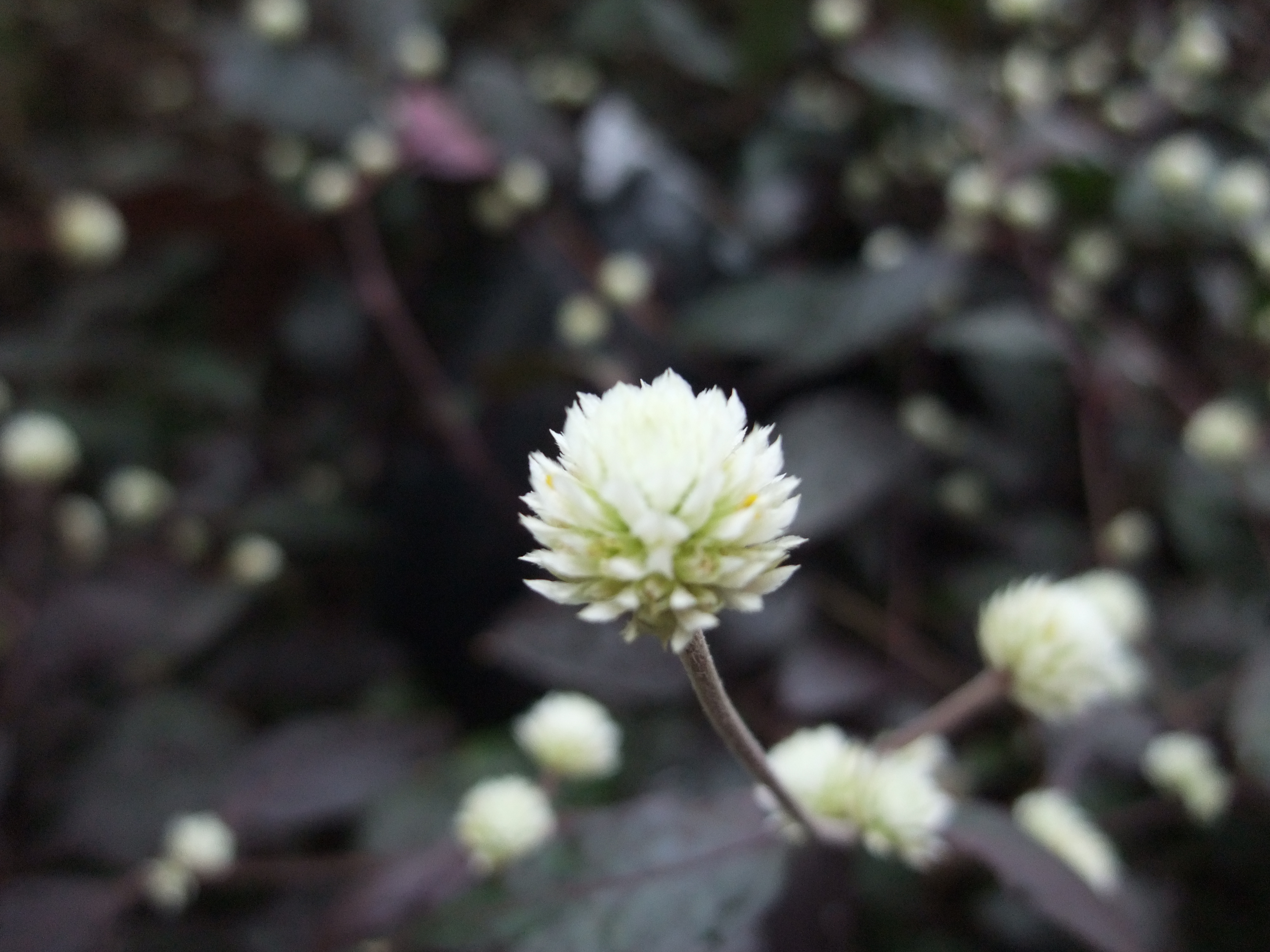
Flower

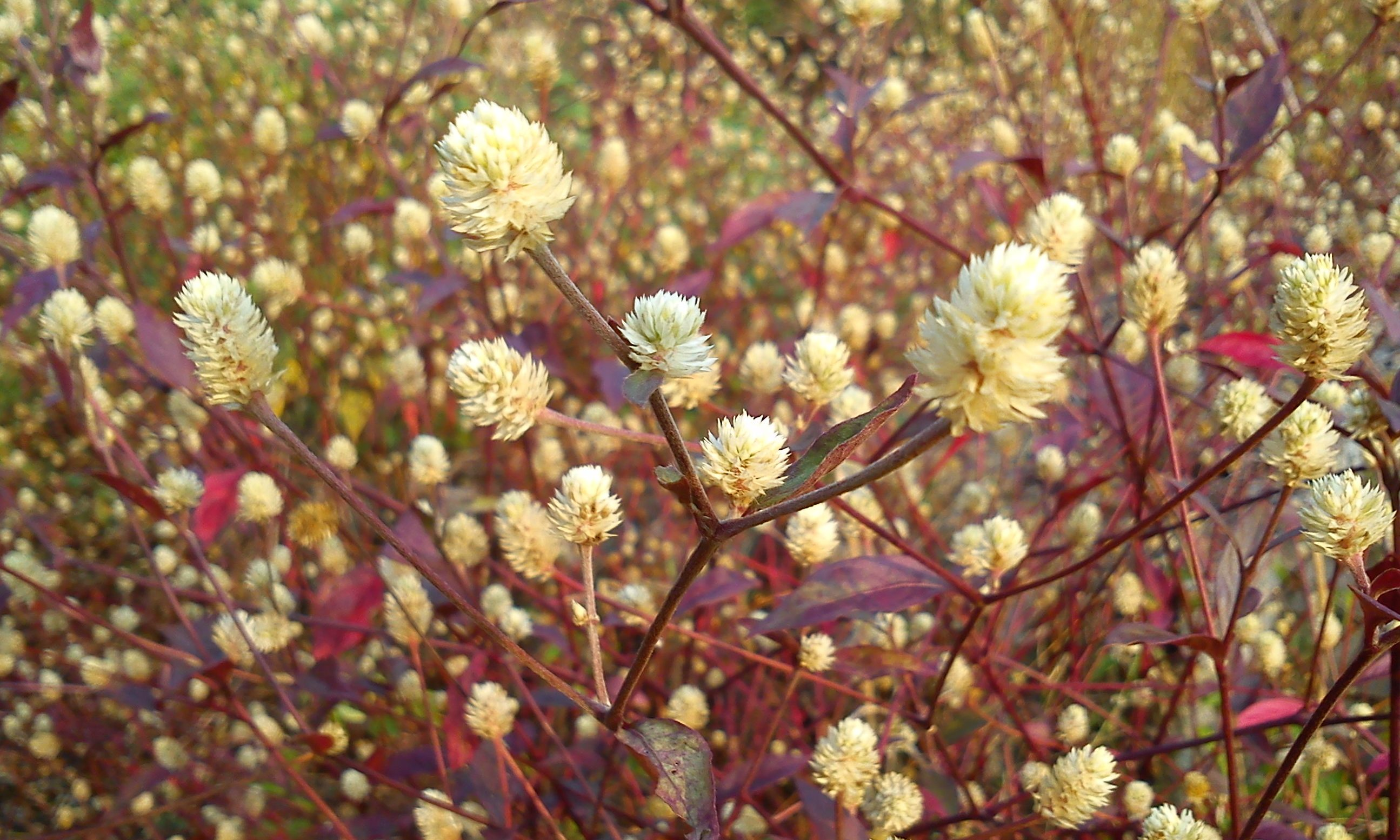
Flowering shrub

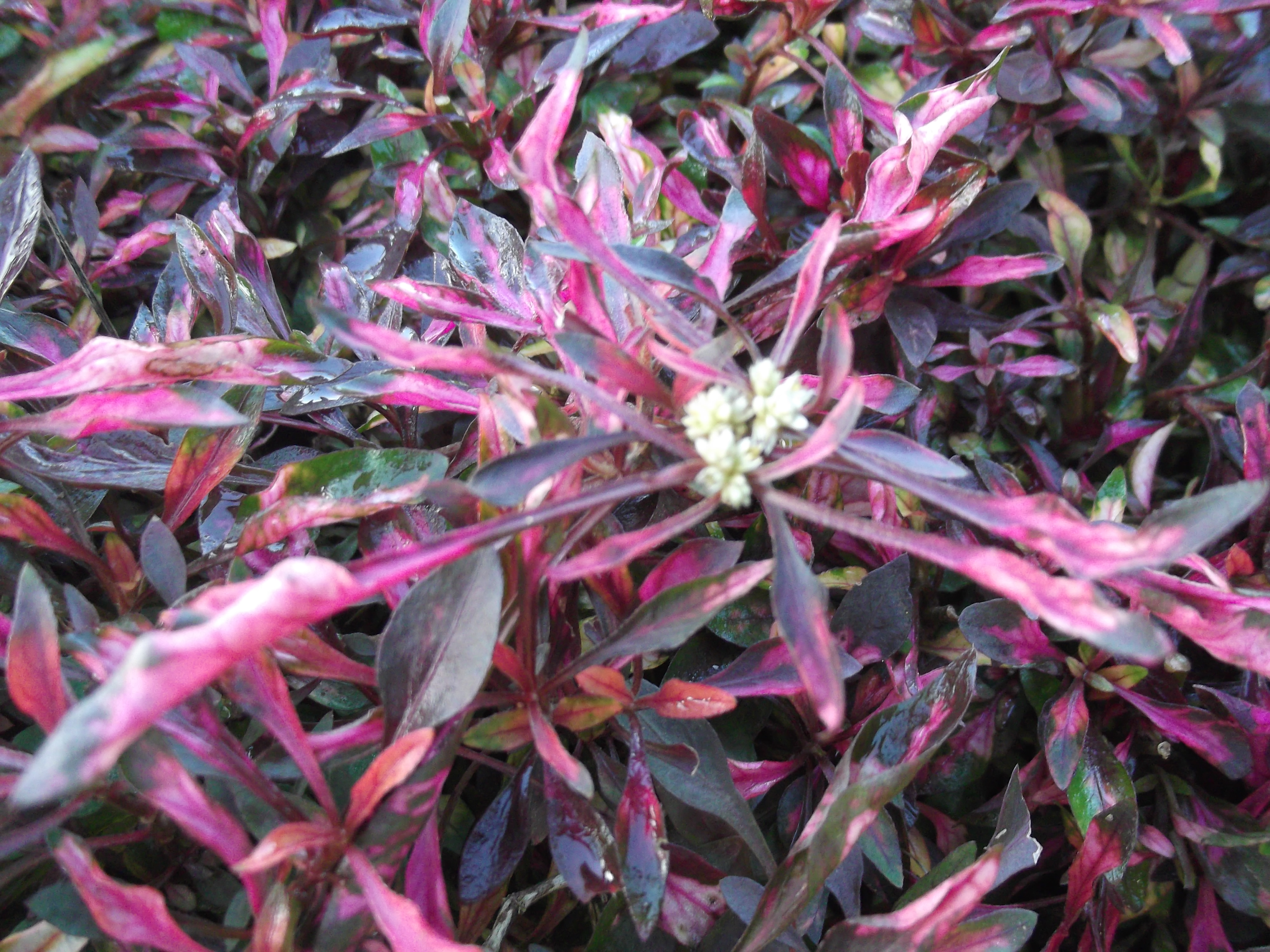
'Red Xavier'

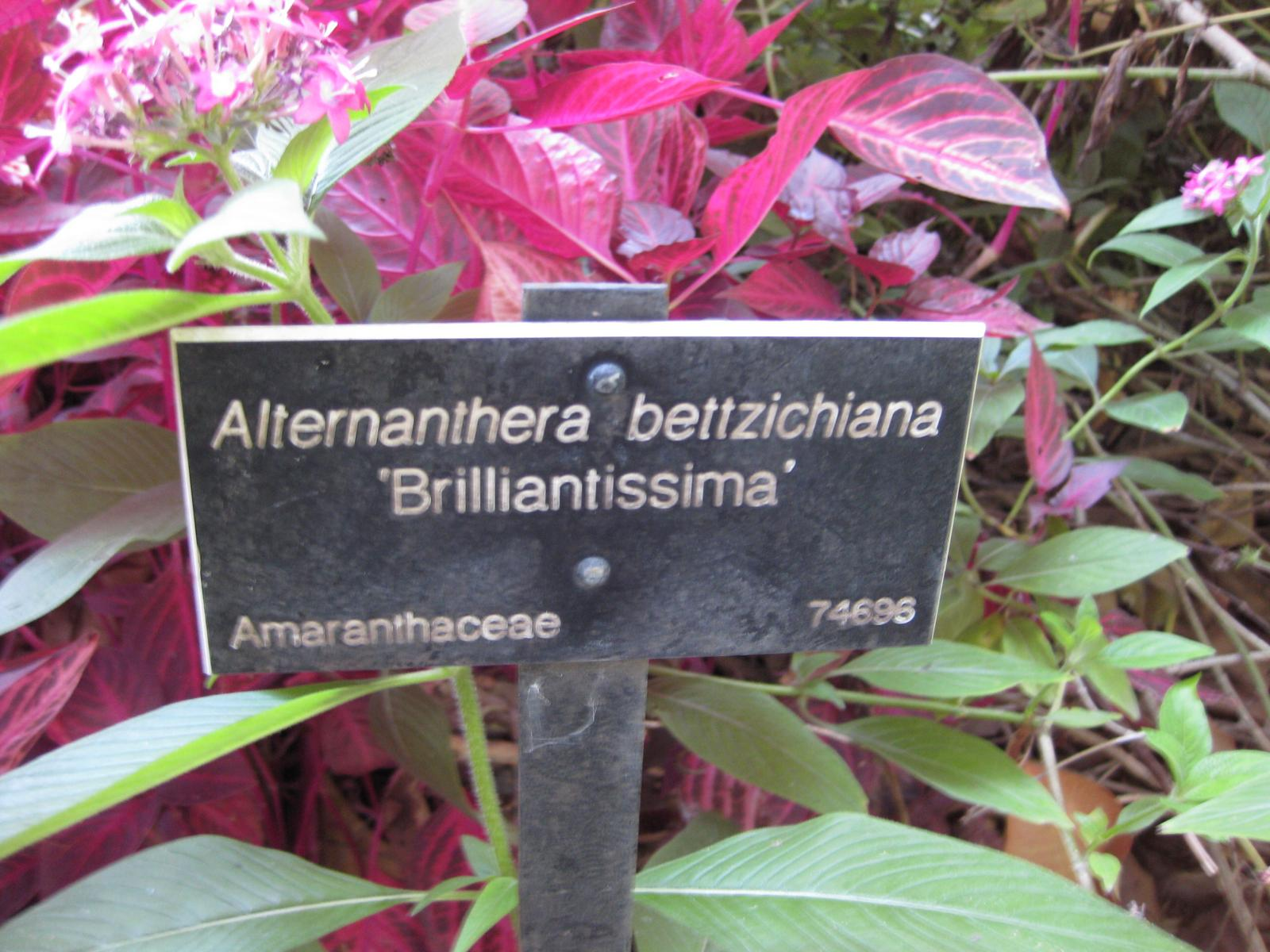
'Brilliantissima' cultivar

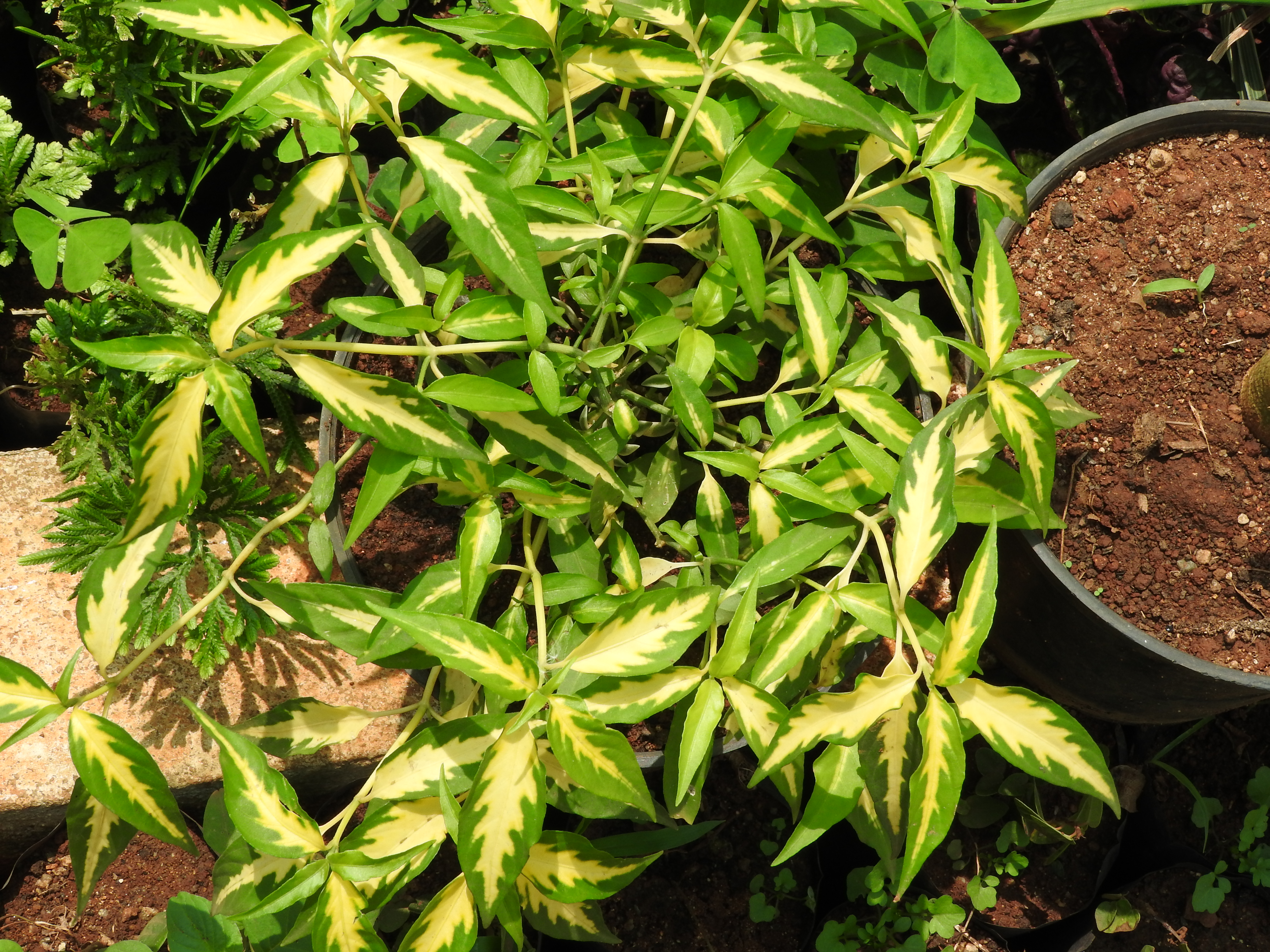
Green yellow cultivar

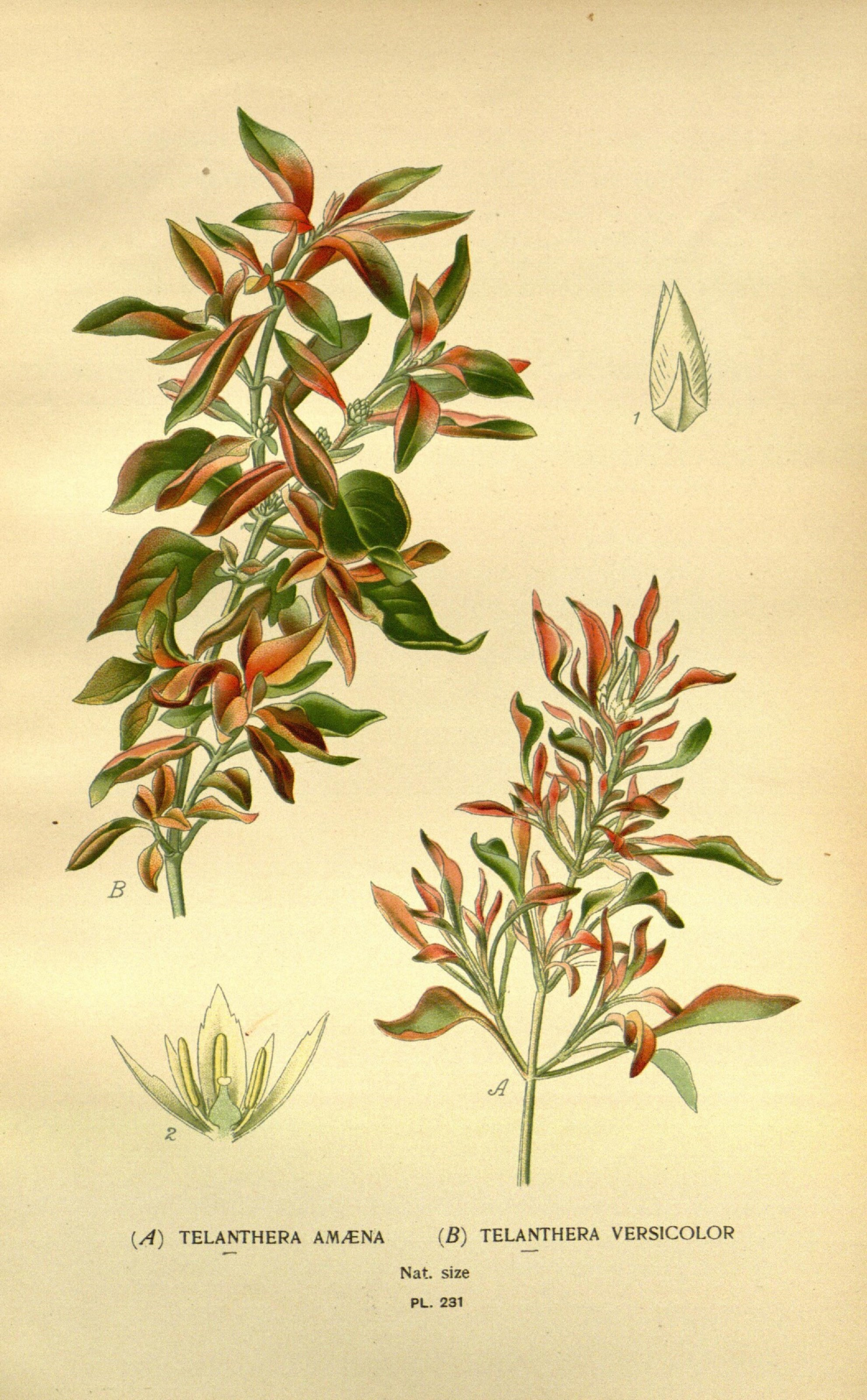
Botanical illustration
