= List of endemic plants of the Galápagos Islands =

This is a list of endemic vascular plants of the Galápagos Islands, which are politically part of Ecuador. The islands are home to dozens of endemic species and subspecies of plants, including endemic genera Brachycereus, Jasminocereus, Scalesia, Sicyocaulis, and Trigonopterum.

Plants are listed alphabetically by plant family.

† indicates species believed to be extinct.

== Acanthaceae ==
- Justicia galapagana Lindau ex B.L.Rob.

== Aizoaceae ==
- Sesuvium edmonstonei Hook.f.

== Amaranthaceae ==
- Alternanthera echinocephala (Hook.f.) Christoph.
- Alternanthera filifolia (Hook.f.) J.T.Howell
  - Alternanthera filifolia subsp. filifolia
  - Alternanthera filifolia subsp. glauca J.T.Howell
  - Alternanthera filifolia subsp. glaucescens (Hook.f.) Eliasson
  - Alternanthera filifolia subsp. microcephala Eliasson
  - Alternanthera filifolia subsp. nudicaulis (Hook.f.) Eliasson
  - Alternanthera filifolia subsp. pintensis Eliasson
  - Alternanthera filifolia subsp. rabidensis Eliasson
  - Alternanthera filifolia subsp. sylvatica J.T.Howell
- Alternanthera flavicoma (Andersson) J.T.Howell
- Alternanthera flosculosa J.T.Howell
- Alternanthera galapagensis (A.Stewart) J.T.Howell
- Alternanthera helleri (B.L.Rob.) J.T.Howell
- Alternanthera nesiotes I.M.Johnst.
- Alternanthera rugulosa (B.L.Rob.) J.T.Howell
- Alternanthera snodgrassii (B.L.Rob.) J.T.Howell
- Alternanthera vestita (Andersson) J.T.Howell
- Amaranthus furcatus J.T.Howell
- Amaranthus polygonoides subsp. urceolatus (Benth.) Iamonico
- Amaranthus scleranthoides (Andersson) Andersson
- Froelichia juncea B.L.Rob. & Greenm. – I. Isabela, I. Santa Cruz
  - Froelichia juncea subsp. alata J.T.Howell – I. Santa Cruz
  - Froelichia juncea subsp. juncea – I. Isabela, I. Santa Cruz
- Froelichia nudicaulis Hook.f.
  - Froelichia nudicaulis subsp. curta J.T.Howell – I. Pinzón
  - Froelichia nudicaulis subsp. lanigera (Andersson) Eliasson – I. Fernandina, I. Isabela
  - Froelichia nudicaulis subsp. nudicaulis
- Gomphrena radicata (Hook.f.) T.Ortuño & Borsch
- † Gomphrena rigida (B.L.Rob. & Greenm.) T.Ortuño & Borsch – E. San Salvador. Last recorded in 1907.
- Gomphrena subscaposa (Hook.f.) T.Ortuño & Borsch
- Pleuropetalum darwinii Hook.f.

== Apocynaceae ==
- Funastrum angustissimum (Andersson) E.Fourn.
- Vallesia pubescens Andersson

== Araliaceae ==
- Hydrocotyle galapagensis B.L.Rob.

== Aspleniaceae ==
- Asplenium formosum var. carolinum (Maxon) C.V.Morton
- Thelypteris tetragona subsp. aberrans C.V.Morton

== Asteraceae ==
- Acanthospermum brachyceratum S.F.Blake – unplaced
- Acmella darwinii (D.M.Porter) R.K.Jansen
- Baccharis steetzii Andersson
- Chrysanthellum fagerlindii Eliasson
- Chrysanthellum pusillum Hook.f.
- Delilia repens (Hook.f.) Kuntze
- Encelia hispida Andersson
- Erigeron alternifolius (Lawesson & Adsersen) N.Andrus & Tye
- Erigeron darwinii R.Kr.Singh
- Erigeron lancifolius Hook.f.
  - Erigeron lancifolius var. glabriusculus A.Stewart
  - Erigeron lancifolius var. lancifolius
- Haplopappus lanatus Hook.f.
- Jaegeria gracilis Hook.f.
- Lecocarpus darwinii Adsersen – NE. San Cristóbal
- Lecocarpus lecocarpoides (B.L.Rob. & Greenm.) Cronquist & Stuessy – Española, Gardner bay Is.
  - Lecocarpus lecocarpoides subsp. brachyceratus Tye & P.Jaram. – Gardner bay Is.
  - Lecocarpus lecocarpoides subsp. lecocarpoides – Española, Oeste Is.
- Lecocarpus leptolobus (S.F.Blake) Cronquist & Stuessy – SW. San Cristóbal
- Lecocarpus pinnatifidus Decne. – Floreana
- Pectis subsquarrosa Sch.Bip.
- Pectis tenuifolia Sch.Bip.
- Scalesia Arn.
  - Scalesia affinis Hook.f.
    - Scalesia affinis subsp. affinis
    - Scalesia affinis subsp. brachyloba
    - Scalesia affinis subsp. gummifera (Hook.f.) Harling
  - Scalesia aspera Andersson
  - Scalesia atractyloides Arn.
    - Scalesia atractyloides var. atractyloides
    - Scalesia atractyloides var. darwinii (Hook.f.) Eliasson
  - Scalesia baurii B.L.Rob. & Greenm.
    - Scalesia baurii subsp. baurii
    - Scalesia baurii subsp. hopkinsii (B.L.Rob.) Eliasson
  - Scalesia cordata A.Stewart
  - Scalesia crockeri J.T.Howell
  - Scalesia divisa Andersson
  - Scalesia gordilloi O.J.Hamann & Wium-And.
  - Scalesia helleri B.L.Rob.
    - Scalesia helleri subsp. helleri
    - Scalesia helleri subsp. santacruzensis Harling
  - Scalesia incisa Hook.f.
  - Scalesia microcephala B.L.Rob.
    - Scalesia microcephala var. cordifolia Eliasson
    - Scalesia microcephala var. microcephala
  - Scalesia pedunculata Hook.f.
  - Scalesia retroflexa Hemsl.
  - Scalesia stewartii L.Riley
  - Scalesia villosa Stewart & J.T.Howell
- Trigonopterum Steetz
  - Trigonopterum laricifolium (Hook.f.) W.L.Wagner & H.Rob.

== Boraginaceae ==
- Euploca asperrima (Andersson) J.I.M.Melo
- Euploca anderssonii (B.L.Rob.) M.W.Frohl. & M.W.Chase
- Tiquilia darwinii (Hook.f.) A.T.Richardson
- Tiquilia fusca (Hook.f.) A.T.Richardson
- Tiquilia galapagoa (J.T.Howell) A.T.Richardson
- Tiquilia nesiotica (J.T.Howell) A.T.Richardson
- Tournefortia pubescens Hook.f.
- Tournefortia rufosericea Hook.f.
- Varronia canescens Andersson
- Varronia leucophlyctis (Hook.f.) Andersson
- Varronia revoluta (Hook.f.) Andersson
- Varronia scouleri (Hook.f.) Andersson

== Brassicaceae ==
- Lepidium galapagoensis Al-Shehbaz

== Bromeliaceae ==
- Racinaea insularis (Mez) M.A.Spencer & L.B.Sm.

== Burseraceae ==
- Bursera graveolens subsp. malacophylla (B.L.Rob.) A.Weeks & Tye

== Cactaceae ==
- Brachycereus Britton & Rose
  - Brachycereus nesioticus (K.Schum.) Backeb.
- Jasminocereus Britton & Rose
  - Jasminocereus thouarsii (F.A.C.Weber) Backeb.
- Opuntia galapageia Hensl.
  - Opuntia galapageia subvar. barringtonensis (E.Y.Dawson) Backeb. – Santa Fe
  - Opuntia galapageia var. galapageia
  - Opuntia galapageia var. gigantea (J.T.Howell) Backeb. – Santa Cruz
  - Opuntia galapageia var. helleri (K.Schum. ex B.L.Rob.) Backeb. – Darwin, Genovesa, Marchena, Wolf
  - Opuntia galapageia subvar. inermis (E.Y.Dawson) Backeb. – Isabela
  - Opuntia galapageia var. insularis (A.Stewart) Backeb. – Fernandina, Isabela
  - Opuntia galapageia var. macrocarpa E.Y.Dawson – Pinzón
  - Opuntia galapageia var. myriacantha (F.A.C.Weber) Backeb.
  - Opuntia galapageia var. profusa E.F.Anderson & Walk. – Isabela, Santiago
  - Opuntia galapageia var. saxicola (J.T.Howell) Backeb. – Isabela
  - Opuntia galapageia var. zacana (J.T.Howell) Backeb. – Seymour

== Caryophyllaceae ==
- Drymaria monticola J.T.Howell

== Convolvulaceae ==
- Convolvulus galapagensis Andersson
- Cuscuta gymnocarpa Engelm.
- Ipomoea habeliana Oliv.

== Cucurbitaceae ==
- Sicyocaulis Wiggins
  - Sicyocaulis pentagonus Wiggins
- † Sicyos villosus Hook.f. – Floreana. Last recorded in 1835.

== Cyatheaceae ==
- Cyathea weatherbyana (C.V.Morton) C.V.Morton

== Cyperaceae ==
- Cyperus anderssonii Boeckeler
- Cyperus elegans subsp. rubiginosus (Hook.f.) Eliasson
- Cyperus grandifolius Andersson

== Dennstaedtiaceae ==
- Hypolepis galapagensis Schwartsb. & J.Prado

== Ericaceae ==
- Gaultheria howellii (Sleumer) D.J.Middleton

== Euphorbiaceae ==
- Acalypha abingdonii Seberg – Marchena I., Pinta I.
- Acalypha flaccida Hook.f. – San Salvador
- Acalypha parvula Hook.f.
  - Acalypha parvula var. chathamensis (B.L.Rob.) G.L.Webster – San Cristóbal
  - Acalypha parvula var. parvula
  - Acalypha parvula var. reniformis (Hook.f.) Müll.Arg
  - Acalypha parvula var. strobilifera (Hook.f.) Müll.Arg
- Acalypha sericea Andersson
  - Acalypha sericea var. baurii (B.L.Rob. & Greenm.) G.L.Webster – SW. San Cristobal
  - Acalypha sericea var. indefessus G.L.Webster – Santa Cruz
  - Acalypha sericea var. sericea
- Acalypha velutina Hook.f. – Santa Maria
- Acalypha wigginsii G.L.Webster – Santa Cruz I.
- Croton scouleri Hook.f.
  - Croton scouleri var. brevifolius (Andersson) Müll.Arg. – I. Santa María
  - Croton scouleri var. darwinii G.L.Webster – Darwin, Wolf
  - Croton scouleri var. grandifolius Müll.Arg.
  - Croton scouleri var. scouleri
- Euphorbia abdita (D.G.Burch) Radcl.-Sm.
- Euphorbia amplexicaulis Hook.f.
- Euphorbia bindloensis (A.Stewart) Ya Yang
- Euphorbia equisetiformis A.Stewart
- Euphorbia galapageia B.L.Rob. & Greenm.
- Euphorbia nummularia Hook.f.
- Euphorbia punctulata Andersson
- Euphorbia recurva Hook.f.
- Euphorbia viminea Hook.f.

== Fabaceae ==
- Dalea tenuicaulis Hook.f.
- Phaseolus mollis Hook.f.

== Hypericaceae ==
- Hypericum silenoides subsp. minus N.Robson

== Iridaceae ==
- Sisyrinchium galapagense Ravenna

== Lamiaceae ==
- Mesosphaerum gymnocaulon (Epling) Harley & J.F.B.Pastore
- Salvia prostrata Hook.f.

== Linaceae ==
- Linum cratericola Eliasson
- Linum harlingii Eliasson

== Lycopodiaceae ==
- Huperzia galapagensis (O.J.Hamann) Holub

== Malvaceae ==
- Fuertesimalva insularis (Kearney) Fryxell
- Gossypium darwinii G.Watt
- Gossypium klotzschianum subsp. klotzschianum
- Pseudabutilon depauperatum (Hook.f.) Kearney

== Molluginaceae ==
- Mollugo crockeri J.T.Howell
- Mollugo flavescens Andersson
  - Mollugo flavescens subsp. flavescens
  - Mollugo flavescens subsp. gracillima (Andersson) Eliasson
  - Mollugo flavescens subsp. insularis (J.T.Howell) J.T.Howell ex Eliasson
  - Mollugo flavescens subsp. striata (J.T.Howell) Eliasson
- Mollugo floriana (B.L.Rob.) J.T.Howell
  - Mollugo floriana subsp. floriana
  - Mollugo floriana subsp. gypsophiloides J.T.Howell
  - Mollugo floriana subsp. santacruziana (Christoph.) Eliasson

== Montiaceae ==
- Calandrinia galapagosa H.St.John – I. San Crostóbal: Soppho Cave

== Nyctaginaceae ==
- Pisonia floribunda Hook.f.

== Orchidaceae ==
- Cranichis lichenophila D.Weber – I. Isabela
- Cyclopogon werffii Dodson – I. Santa Cruz
- Epidendrum spicatum Hook.f.
- Microchilus ceratostele Ormerod
- Ponthieva insularis Dressler

== Passifloraceae ==
- Passiflora colinvauxii Wiggins
- Passiflora tridactylites Hook.f.
- Passiflora vesicaria var. galapagensis (Killip) Vanderpl.

== Piperaceae ==
- Peperomia galapagensis Hook.f. ex Miq.
- Peperomia petiolata Hook.f.

== Plantaginaceae ==
- Galvezia leucantha Wiggins
  - Galvezia leucantha subsp. leucantha
  - Galvezia leucantha subsp. porphyrantha Tye & H.Jäger
- Plantago galapagensis Rahn

== Poaceae ==
- Aristida divulsa Andersson
- Aristida subspicata Trin. & Rupr.
- Aristida villosa B.L.Rob. & Greenm.
- Cenchrus platyacanthus Andersson
- Paspalum galapageium Chase
  - Paspalum galapageium var. galapageium
  - Paspalum galapageium var. minoratum Chase
  - Paspalum galapageium var. redundans (Chase) Delfini & Zuloaga
- Peyritschia howellii (Hitchc.) Finot & P.M.Peterson
- Trichoneura lindleyana (Kunth) Ekman
- Urochloa multiculma (Andersson) Morrone & Zuloaga

== Polygalaceae ==
- Senega anderssonii (B.L.Rob.) J.F.B.Pastore
- Senega galapageia (Hook.f.) J.F.B.Pastore
  - Senega galapageia var. galapageia
  - Senega galapageia var. insularis (A.W.Benn.) J.F.B.Pastore
- Senega sancti-georgii (L.Riley) J.F.B.Pastore
  - Senega sancti-georgii var. oblanceolata (J.T.Howell) J.F.B.Pastore & Agust.Martinez
  - Senega sancti-georgii var. sancti-georgii

== Polygonaceae ==
- Persicaria galapagensis (Caruel) Galasso

== Polypodiaceae ==
- Megalastrum galapagense R.C.Moran
- Megalastrum pleiosoros (Hook.f.) A.R.Sm. & R.C.Moran
- Pleopeltis insularum (C.V.Morton) A.R.Sm.
- Pleopeltis tridens J.Sm.

== Portulacaceae ==
- Portulaca howellii (D.Legrand) Eliasson

== Pteridaceae ==
- Hemionitis galapagensis (Weath. & Svenson) Christenh.
- Pteris blanchetiana C.Presl ex Ettingsh.
- Pteris hostmanniana Ettingsh.

== Rhamnaceae ==
- Scutia spicata var. pauciflora (Hook.f.) M.C.Johnst.

== Rubiaceae ==
- Galium galapagoense Wiggins
- Psychotria angustata Andersson
- Psychotria rufipes Hook.f.
- Spermacoce dispersa (Hook.f.) Kuntze
- Spermacoce divaricata (Hook.f.) Kuntze
- Spermacoce linearifolia (Hook.f.) Kuntze
- Spermacoce perpusilla (Hook.f.) Kuntze
- Spermacoce rotundifolia (Andersson) Fosberg
- Spermacoce suberecta (Hook.f.) Kuntze

== Simaroubaceae ==
- Castela galapageia Hook.f.

== Solanaceae ==
- Capsicum galapagoense Hunz.
- Exodeconus miersii (Hook.f.) D'Arcy
- Iochroma ellipticum (Hook.f.) Hunz.
- Jaltomata werffii D'Arcy
- Lycium minimum C.L.Hitchc.
- Nolana galapagensis (Christoph.) I.M.Johnst.
- Solanum cheesmaniae (L.Riley) Fosberg
- Solanum galapagense S.C.Darwin & Peralta

== Urticaceae ==
- Pilea baurii B.L.Rob.

== Verbenaceae ==
- Lantana peduncularis Andersson
- Lippia rosmarinifolia Andersson
- Lippia salicifolia Andersson – Santa Maria
- Verbena grisea B.L.Rob. & Greenm. – Pinzon
- Verbena townsendii Svenson

== Zygophyllaceae ==
- Kallstroemia adscendens (Andersson) B.L.Rob.
