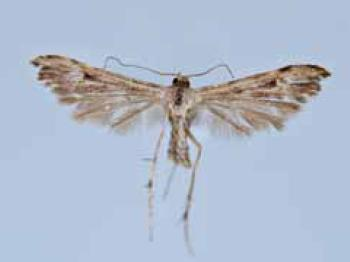

Scientific classification
- Kingdom: Animalia
- Phylum: Arthropoda
- Clade: Pancrustacea
- Class: Insecta
- Order: Lepidoptera
- Family: Pterophoridae
- Genus: Adaina
- Species: A. scalesiae

Binomial name
- Adaina scalesiae Landry, Roque & Matthews, 2004

= Adaina scalesiae =

Species of plume moth

Adaina scalesiae is a moth of the family Pterophoridae that is endemic to the Galapagos Islands, where it was discovered by Bernard Landry on Bella Vista on April 1, 1992, and on May 25 of the same year on the island of Santa Cruz. The species was also found in Volcan Darwin, a province 15 kilometres (9.3 mi) from Puerto Villamil, on May 25, and 400 metres (1,300 ft) above sea level on Pinta Island where it was found from March 13 to 21. The species is attracted to various lamps including mercury-vapor lamps.

The wingspan is 11–13 millimetres (0.43–0.51 in). Adults are on wing from January to May, July to September, and into December. Adults are on wing nearly year-round in the southern part of their range.

The larvae feed on Scalesia microcephala, Scalesia baurii hopkinsii, Scalesia villosa, Scalesia pendiculata, Scalesia gordilloi, Scalesia retroflexa and Lecocarpus lecocarpoides.

This species was misidentified as Adaina ambrosiae initially by Landry in his 1993 paper.
