= Stickyweed =

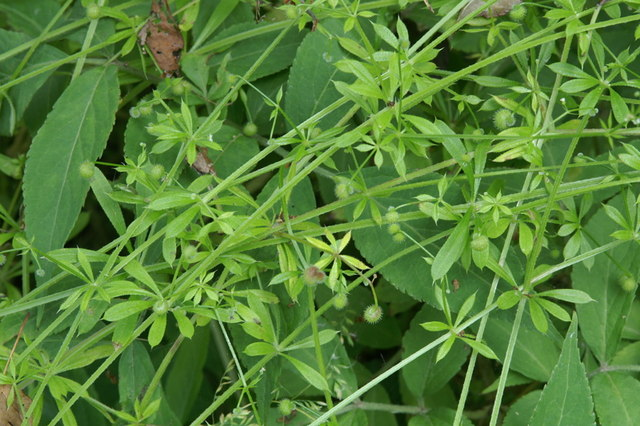
Galium aparine

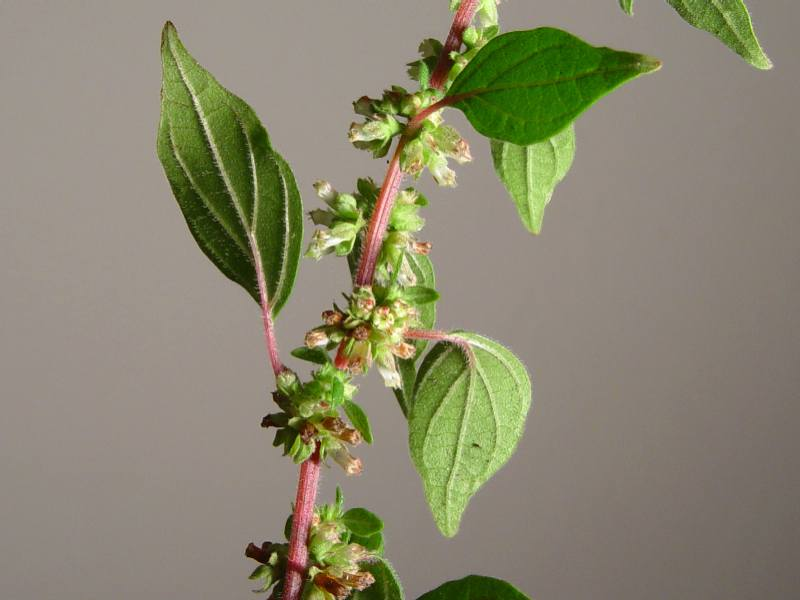
Parietaria judaica

Stickyweed may refer to several plant species including:

- Galium aparine (cleavers), an annual plant found in Africa, Asia, Australia, Europe, North America, and South America
- Parietaria judaica (spreading pellitory), a perennial plant found in Europe, central and western Asia and northern Africa
- Drymaria cordata, a species of the genus Drymaria
