= F. juncea =

F. juncea may refer to:

- Freesia juncea, a southeastern African plant
- Froelichia juncea, a plant native to the Galápagos Islands
