= L. darwinii =

L. darwinii may refer to:

- Lecocarpus darwinii, a flowering plant species found only in Galápagos Islands and Ecuador
- Leucosolenia darwinii
- Liolaemus darwinii, a lizard species in the genus Liolaemus

== See also ==
- Darwinii (disambiguation)
