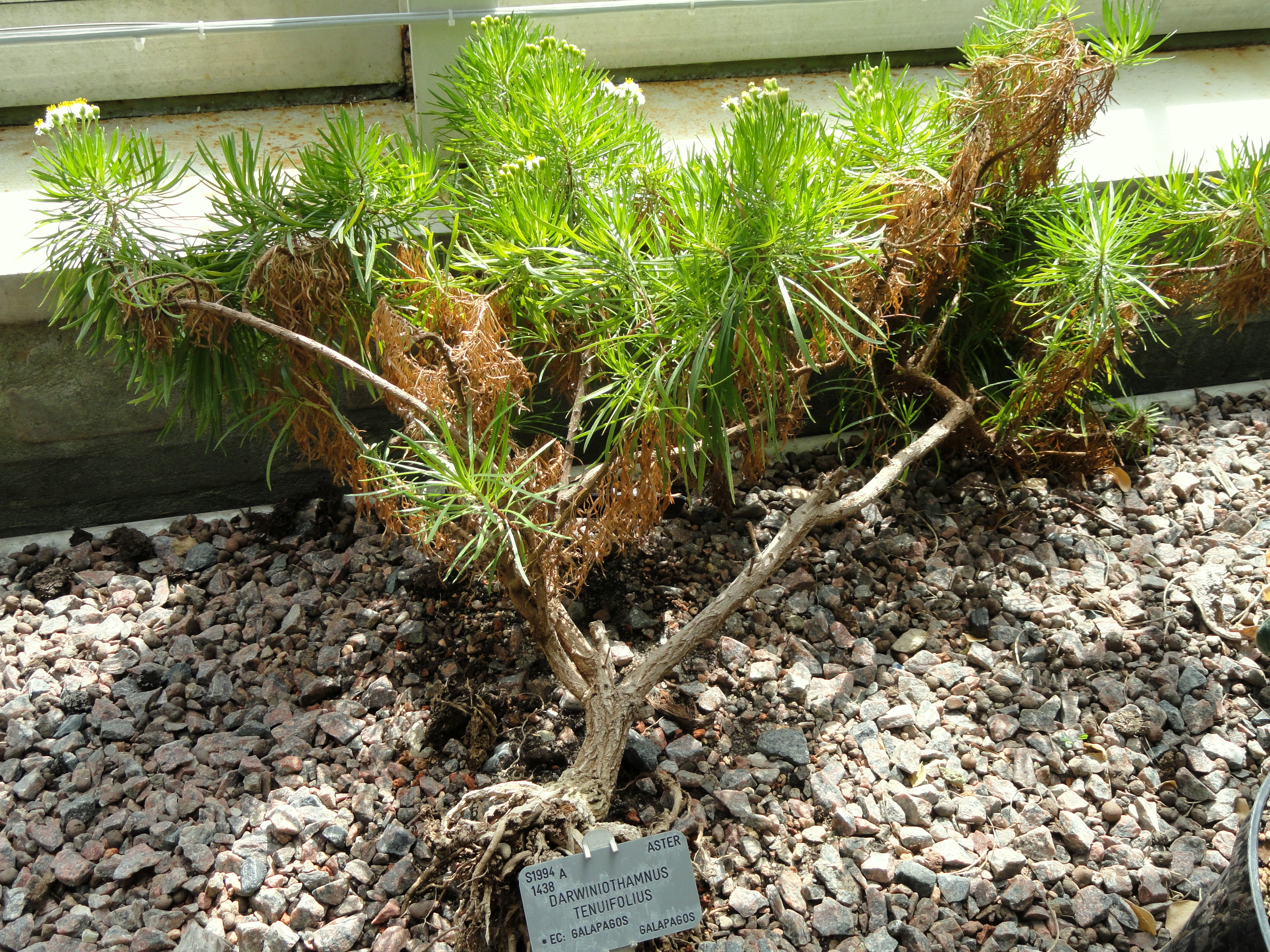
- Darwiniothamnus tenuifolius

Scientific classification
- Kingdom: Plantae
- Clade: Tracheophytes
- Clade: Angiosperms
- Clade: Eudicots
- Clade: Asterids
- Order: Asterales
- Family: Asteraceae
- Tribe: Astereae
- Genus: Darwiniothamnus; Harling

= Darwiniothamnus =

Genus of flowering plants

Darwiniothamnus is a genus of flowering plants in the sunflower family.

Species

All three species are endemic to the Galápagos Islands.

- Darwiniothamnus alternifolius Lawesson & Adsersen
- Darwiniothamnus lancifolius (Hook.f.) Harling
- Darwiniothamnus tenuifolius (Hook.f.) Harling
