= Drymaria pratheri =

Scientific classification
- Kingdom: Plantae
- Clade: Tracheophytes
- Clade: Angiosperms
- Clade: Eudicots
- Order: Caryophyllales
- Family: Caryophyllaceae
- Genus: Drymaria
- Species: D. pratheri

Binomial name
- Drymaria pratheri B.L.Turner

Species of flowering plant

Drymaria pratheri is a plant species endemic to a small section of the Mexican state of Nuevo León. It is known only from gypseous soils near Rancho Estacas in the northwestern part of the state near the boundary with Coahuila.

Drymaria pratheri is a branching herb up to 20 cm tall. Stems are green, usually hairless. Leaves are narrow, up to 15 mm long. Flowers are born in groups of 5-10, with sepals less than 4 mm long. Petals are white, about 2.5 mm long, with irregular lacerations along the tip.
