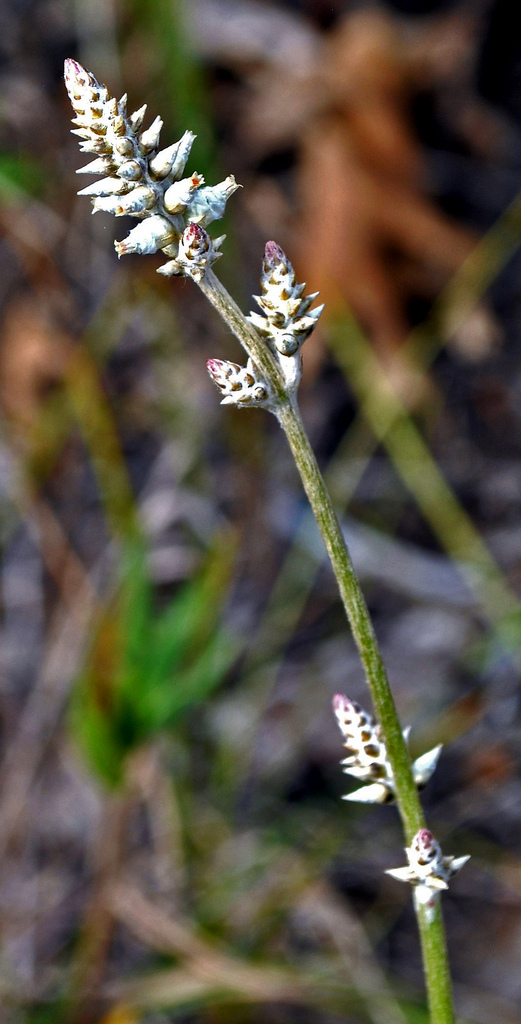

Conservation status
- Secure (NatureServe)

Scientific classification
- Kingdom: Plantae
- Clade: Tracheophytes
- Clade: Angiosperms
- Clade: Eudicots
- Order: Caryophyllales
- Family: Amaranthaceae
- Genus: Froelichia
- Species: F. floridana

Binomial name
- Froelichia floridana (Nutt.) Moq.

Synonyms
- List: Froelichia campestris Small; Froelichia floridana var. campestris (Small) Fernald; Froelichia floridana var. pallescens Moq.; Froelichia gracilis var. floridana (Nutt.) Holz.; Gomphrena exaltata Delile ex Moq.; Gomphrena floridana (Nutt.) Spreng.; Oplotheca floridana Nutt.

= Froelichia floridana =

Species of flowering plant

Froelichia floridana is a species of flowering plant in the genus Froelichia, in the amaranth family (Amaranthaceae). It is known as prairie cottonweed, Florida snakecotton, large cottonweed, field snakecotton, or plains snakecotton. An annual, it produces white woolly flowers on tall flowering stalks, growing up to 40 in (1,000 mm) in height. The narrowly oblanceolate to elliptic leaves are opposite, occurring on the lower third of the stem. It grows in central and eastern North America, from the Great Plains to Mexico, east to the Atlantic Coast. Its propensity to spread easily has resulted in it being considered an agricultural weed and it is an invasive species in Australia.

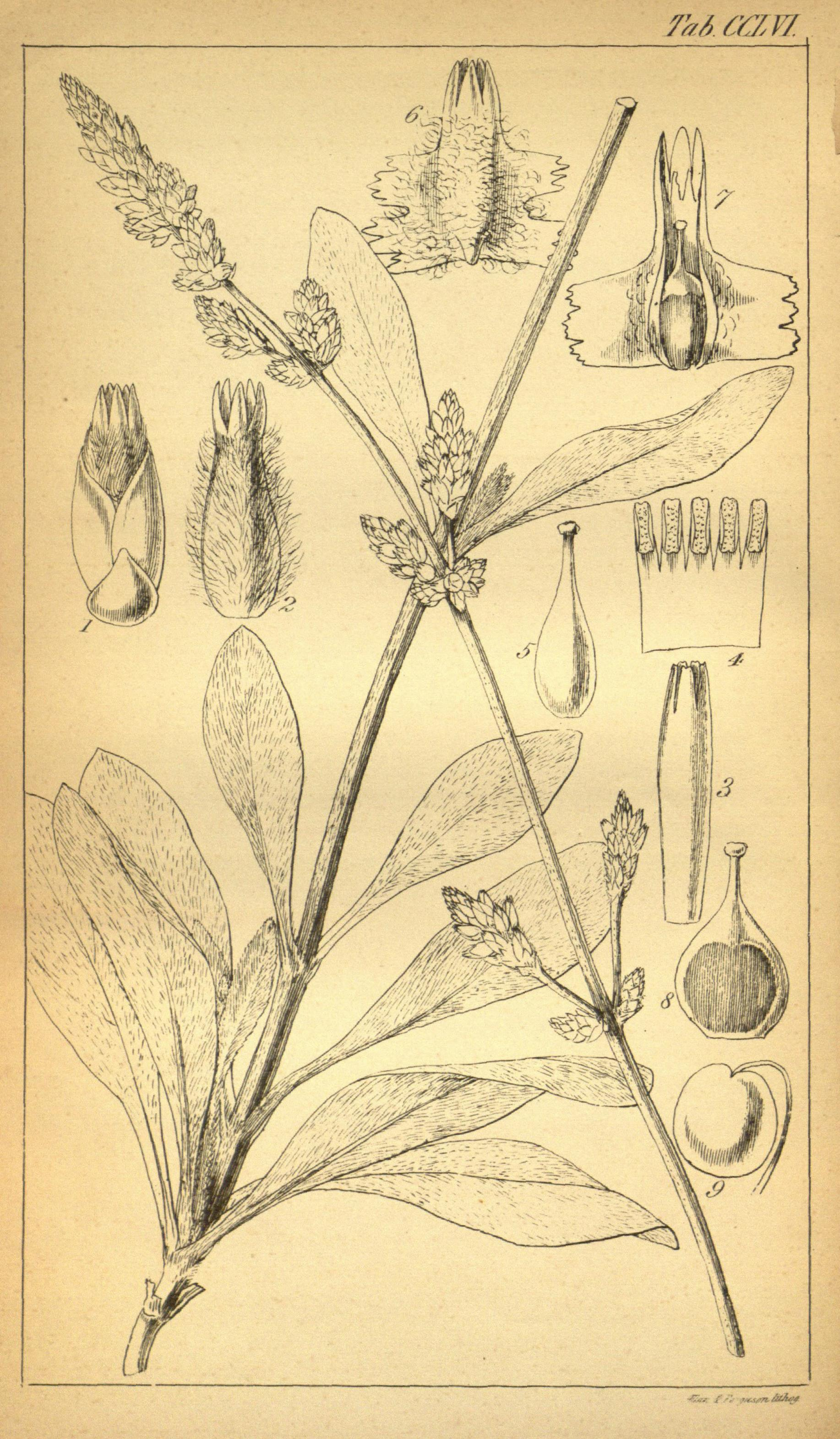
Botanical illustration (1840)

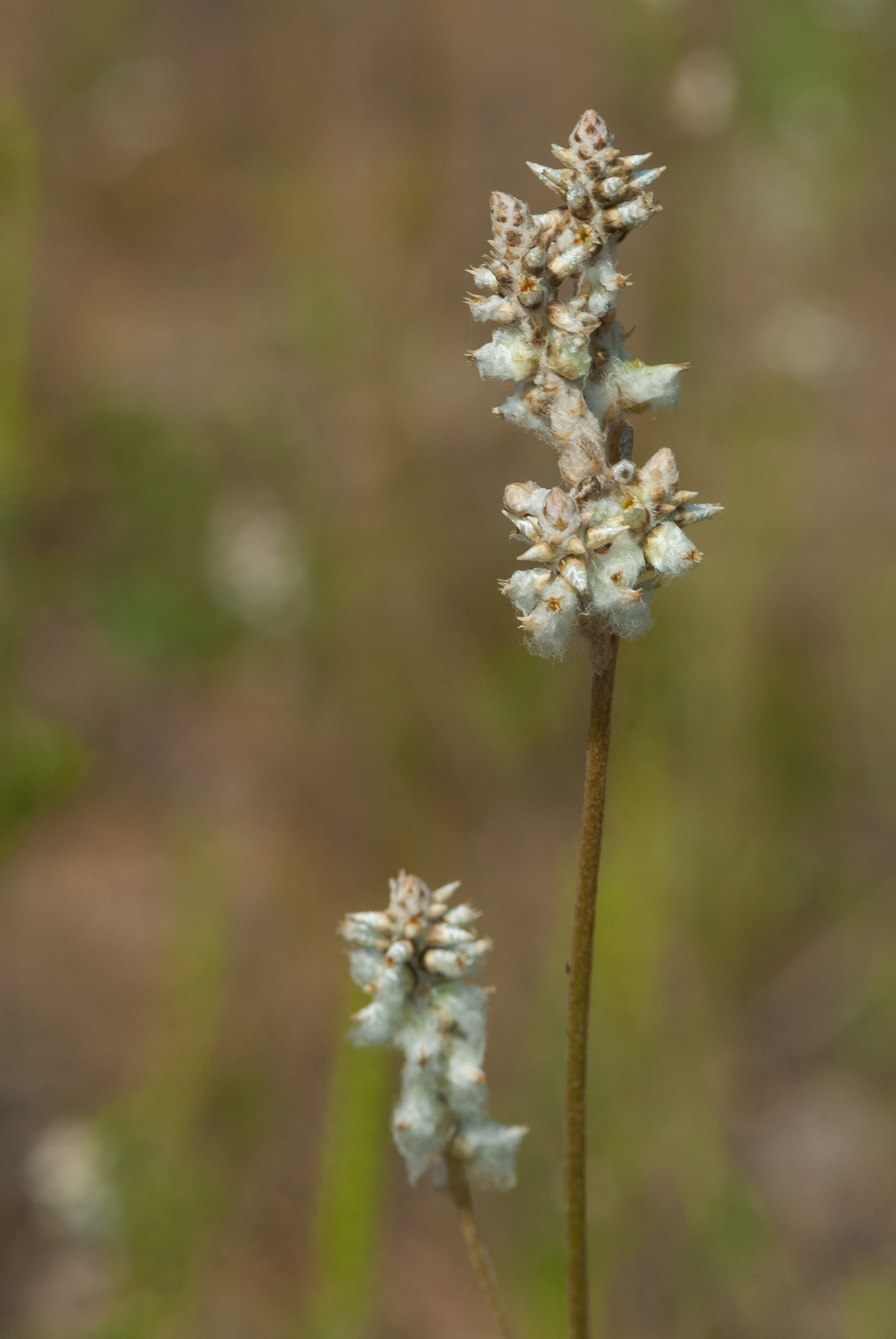
Flowerhead
