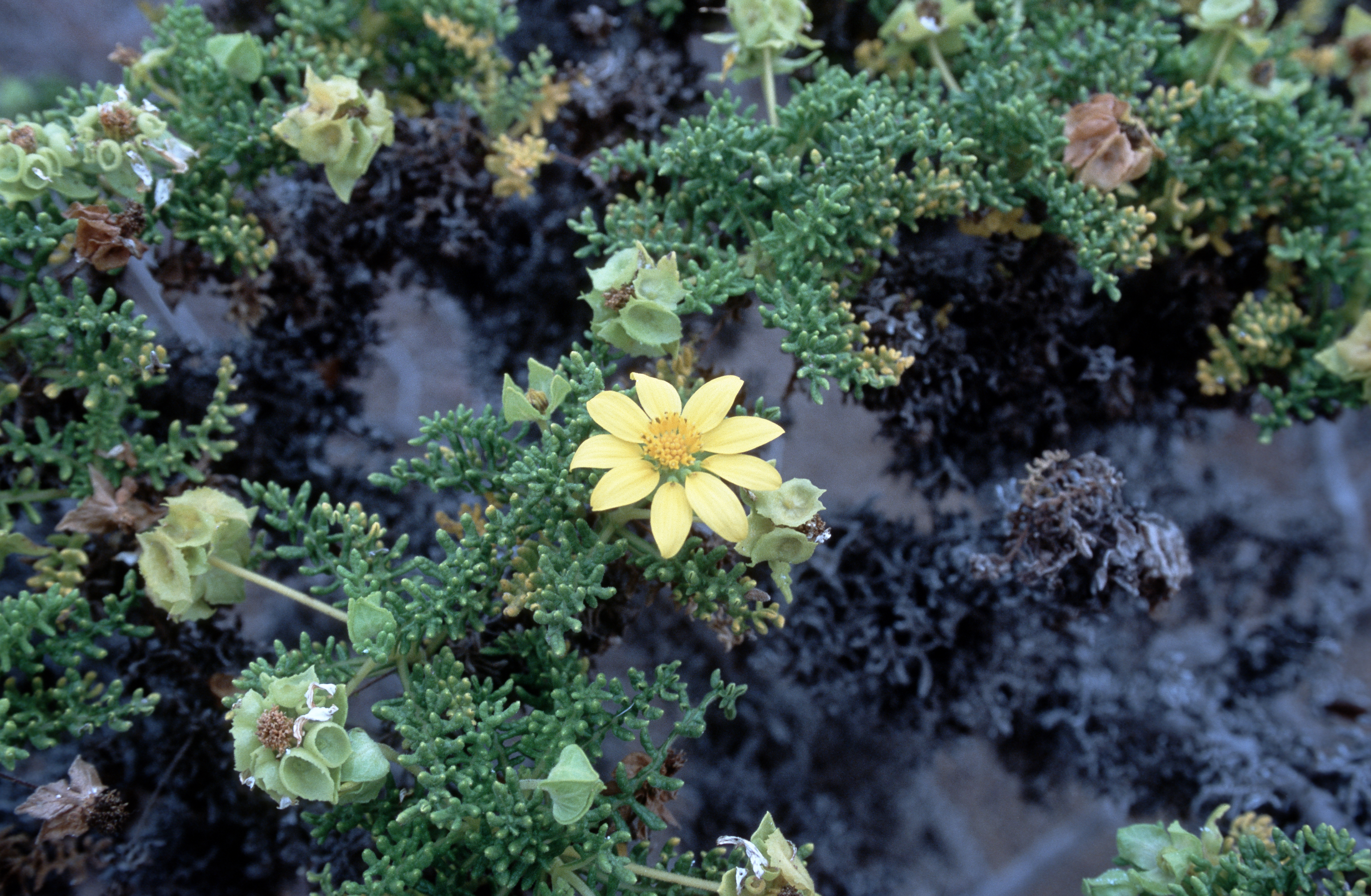
- Lecocarpus pinnatifidus

Scientific classification
- Kingdom: Plantae
- Clade: Tracheophytes
- Clade: Angiosperms
- Clade: Eudicots
- Clade: Asterids
- Order: Asterales
- Family: Asteraceae
- Subfamily: Asteroideae
- Tribe: Millerieae
- Subtribe: Melampodiinae
- Genus: Lecocarpus; Decne.

Type species
- Lecocarpus pinnatifidus Decne.

= Lecocarpus =

Genus of flowering plants

Lecocarpus is a plant genus in the family Asteraceae, native to Galápagos Islands, part of Ecuador.

Species

Four species are accepted.

- Lecocarpus darwinii Adsersen
- Lecocarpus lecocarpoides (B.L.Rob. & Greenm.) Cronquist & Stuessy
- Lecocarpus leptolobus (S.F.Blake) Cronquist & Stuessy
- Lecocarpus pinnatifidus Decne.
