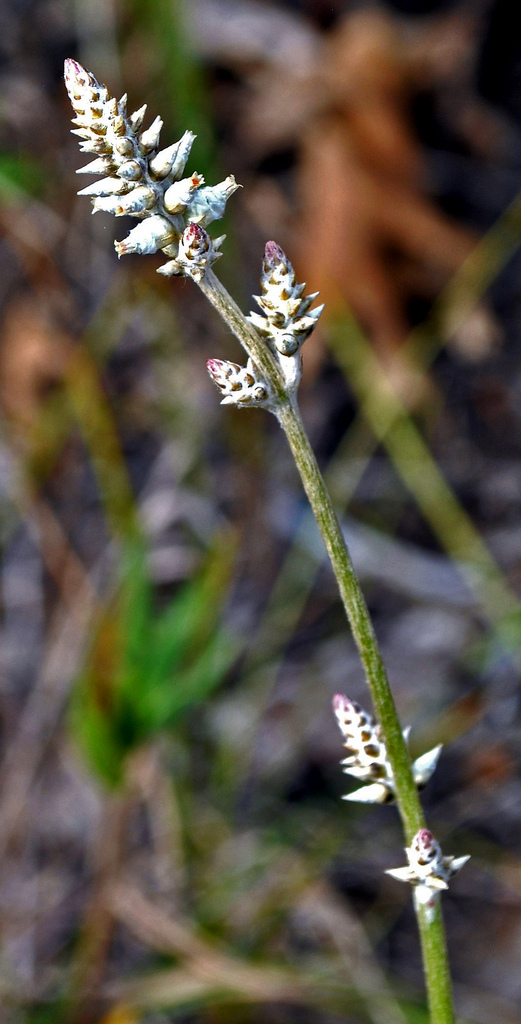
- Froelichia floridana

Scientific classification
- Kingdom: Plantae
- Clade: Tracheophytes
- Clade: Angiosperms
- Clade: Eudicots
- Order: Caryophyllales
- Family: Amaranthaceae
- Subfamily: Gomphrenoideae
- Genus: Froelichia; Moench

= Froelichia =

Genus of flowering plants

Froelichia, or snakecotton, is a genus of plants in the family Amaranthaceae.

Species include:

- Froelichia arizonica
- Froelichia chacoensis
- Froelichia drummondii
- Froelichia floridana
- Froelichia gracilis
- Froelichia humboldtiana
- Froelichia interrupta
- Froelichia juncea B.L. Rob. & Greenm.
- Froelichia nudicaulis Hook.f.
- Froelichia paraguayensis
- Froelichia procera
- Froelichia sericea
- Froelichia texana
- Froelichia tomentosa
- Froelichia xanti
