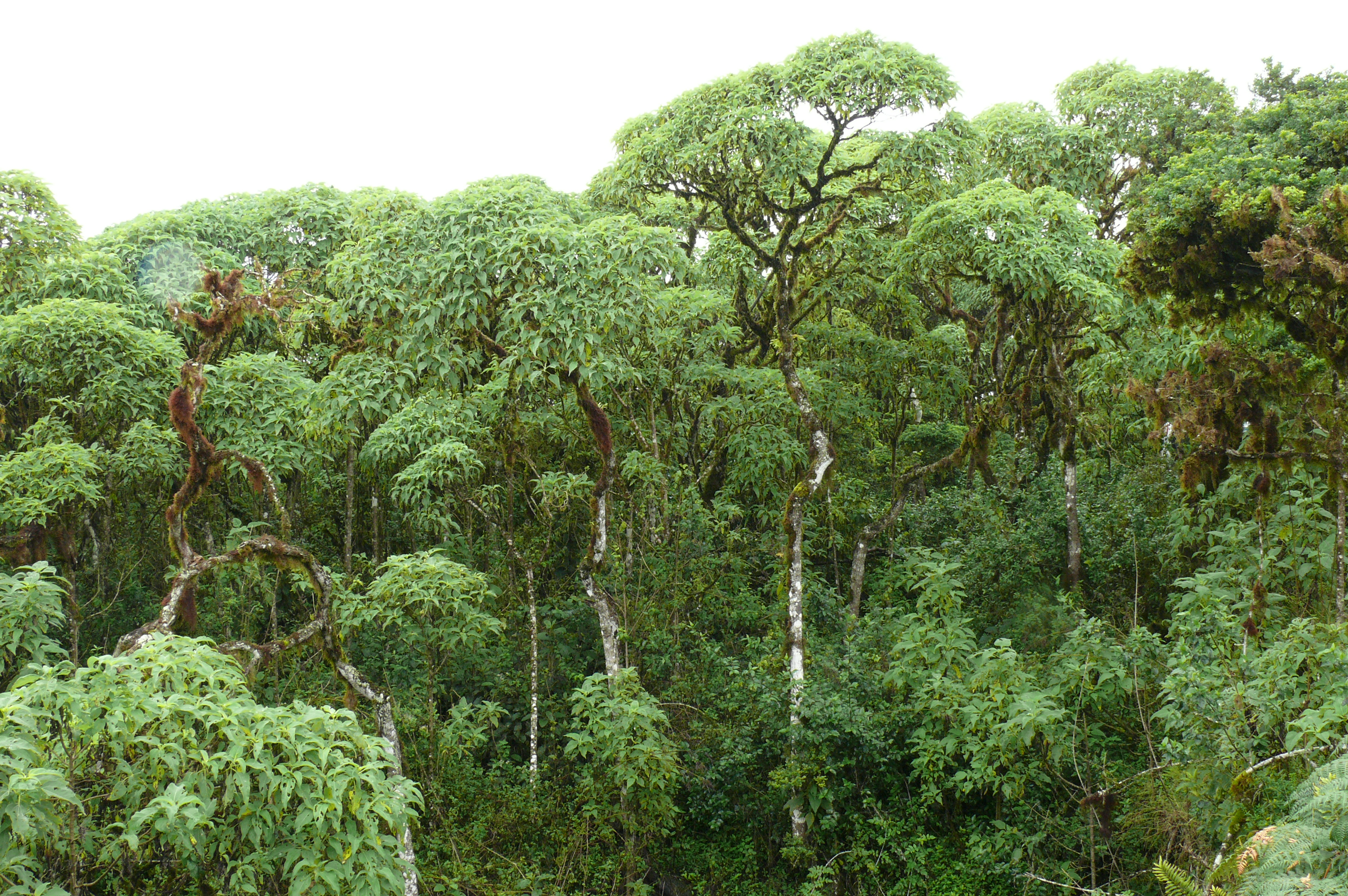
- Scalesia pedunculata on Santa Cruz (Galapagos Islands)

Conservation status
- Vulnerable (IUCN 2.3)

Scientific classification
- Kingdom: Plantae
- Clade: Embryophytes
- Clade: Tracheophytes
- Clade: Spermatophytes
- Clade: Angiosperms
- Clade: Eudicots
- Clade: Asterids
- Order: Asterales
- Family: Asteraceae
- Tribe: Heliantheae
- Genus: Scalesia
- Species: S. pedunculata

Binomial name
- Scalesia pedunculata Hook.f.

= Scalesia pedunculata =

Species of plant endemic to the Galapagos Islands

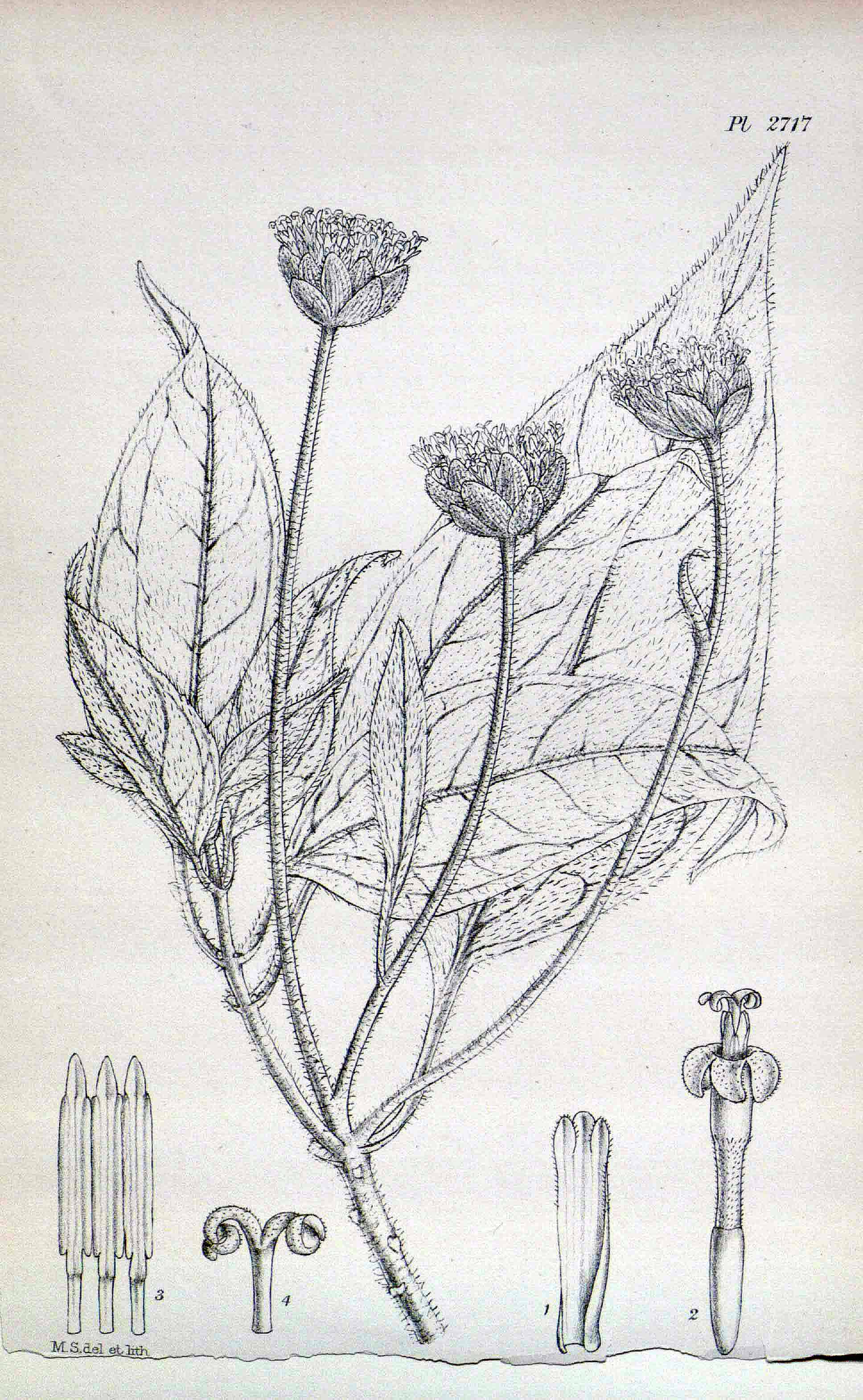
Scalesia pedunculata by Matilda Smith

Scalesia pedunculata is a flowering plant species in the family Asteraceae, growing to a slender tree (20m tall, DBH 20 cm), and found in dense stands on the humid windward coasts of the islands of Santa Cruz, San Cristobal, Santiago and Floreana in the Galapagos Islands. The Galapagos archipelago lies in the southeast trade wind zone, so that climate and weather are dominated by the moisture-bearing trade winds and the topography of the islands. In general, the windward sides of the islands have a much higher precipitation than the leeward sides. Scalesia pedunculata is regarded as vulnerable because of human encroachment, invasive introduced plant species such as Cedrela odorata and Psidium guajava, and grazing by introduced goats. Fires and cutting for fuel are also contributory problems, though the tree's wood is soft, with a large, pithy centre. The inflorescences are capitulae on long peduncles and composed of disc florets only with no ray florets.

Charles Darwin first collected specimens of this species from Santiago Island ('James Island') in October 1835 on the voyage of the Beagle, and it was later named by his friend Joseph Dalton Hooker, who described it as 'frutescens' (becoming a shrub) as he thought that Darwin had made a mistake in calling it a tree, since members of the Daisy family rarely attain such a size. The genus Scalesia comprises 9 species, with another 5 still unassessed and all endemic to the Galapagos Islands, three of which attain tree size viz. Scalesia pedunculata, S. cordata and S. microcephala, all three forming dense forests. The name Scalesia resulted from a blunder by Arnott who named it in honour of "W. Scales Esq., Cawdor Castle, Elginshire" but discovered after publication in 1836 that the name should have read 'Stables', after Scottish botanist William Alexander Stables (1810-21 June 1890), who contributed to botanical literature and was the factor or property manager of John Campbell, 2nd Earl Cawdor.

The biology of this species has not been well studied. Trees take some 15 years to mature, and stands of woodland usually show a dearth of younger trees growing under the canopy. Entire woodlands collapse when stressed by drought or excessive rain. Shortly after this collapse seedlings start germinating once more, suggesting that the species goes through a natural cycle of build-up and collapse.

The first documented collapse of Scalesia forest occurred between 1935 and 1940, with the cause still not being clear. Next was the collapse in 1982-83, coinciding with an El Niño event, which brought heavy rain for many weeks, causing roots to rot and strong winds later flattened the entire forest. On Santa Cruz Scalesia pedunculata grows best at an altitude between 400 – 700 m, a zone which is almost always shrouded in fog, with rain being uncommon. The perennial mists provide moisture to flourishing communities of epiphytes growing on the trunks and branches, with the drops eventually trickling down to ground level and the soil below.

== Gallery ==
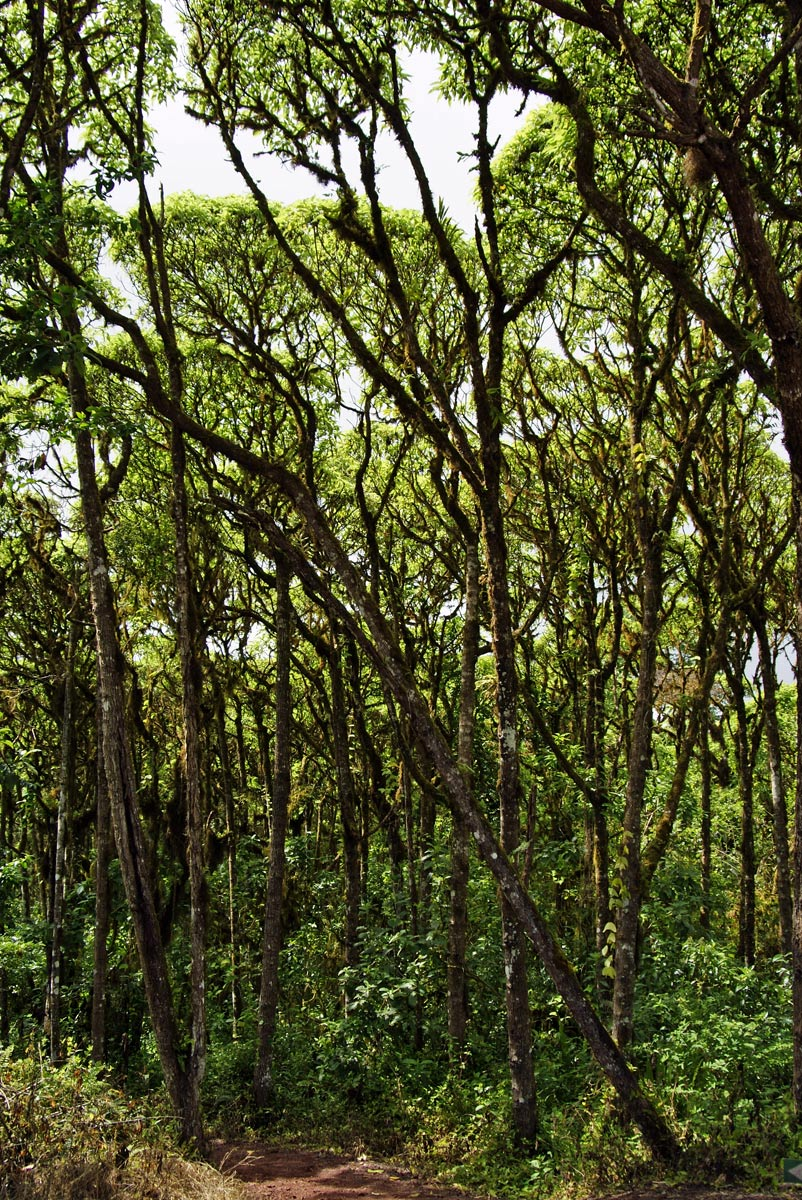
Scalesia pedunculata on Santa Cruz Island - Dallas Krentzel

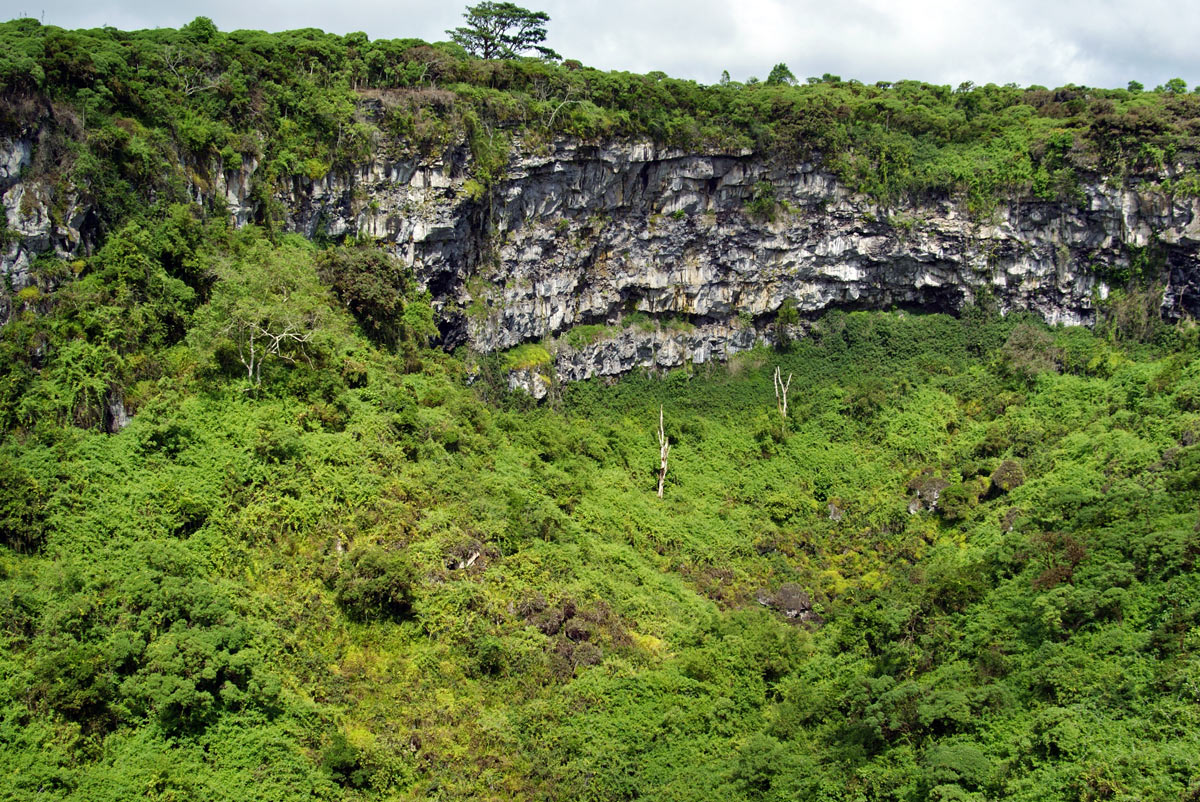
Scalesia pedunculata forest around and in Los Gemelos sinkhole - Dallas Krentzel
