= William Alexander Stables =

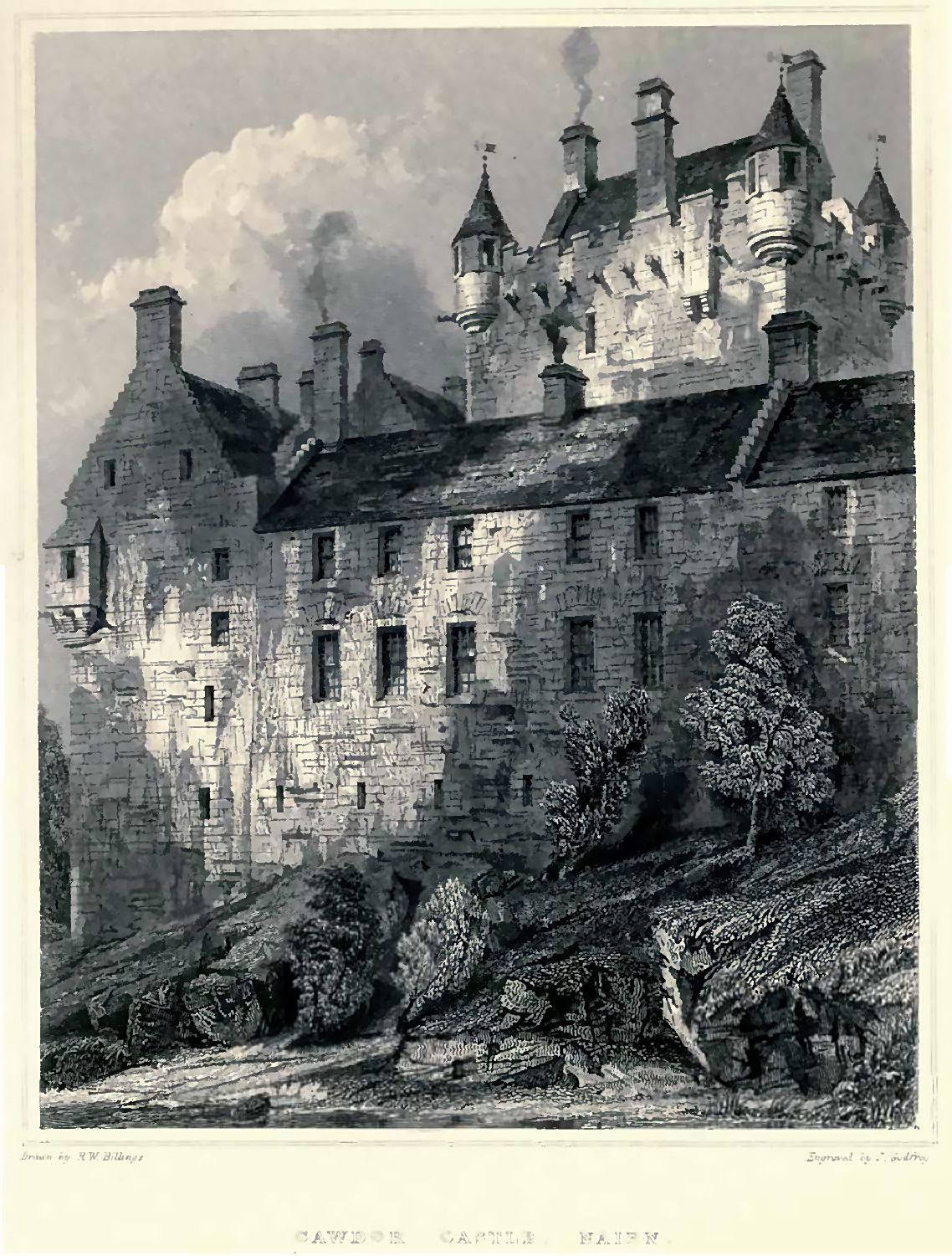
Cawdor Castle

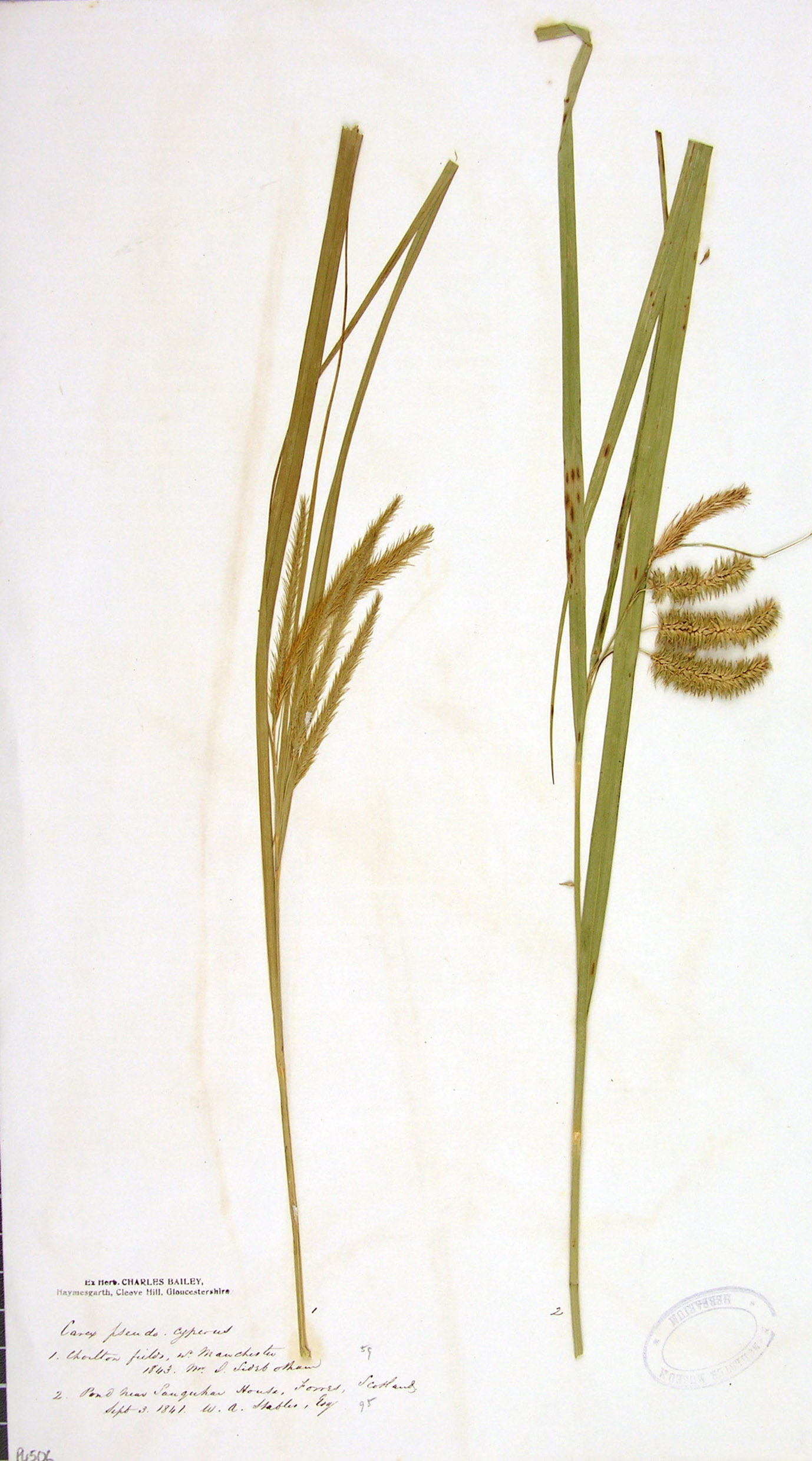
Carex pseudocyperus collected by W. A. Stables (1841)

William Alexander Stables (1810 – 21 June 1890) was a Scottish botanist and naturalist who collected spermatophytes and pteridophytes sporadically in Great Britain and Ireland between 1832 and 1862, with the odd specimen as late as 1882. He was the son of Alexander Stables, factor for Lord Cawdor, and later himself became factor. He was a member of the Botanical Society of Edinburgh and collected extensively for a proposed Flora of Moray in the north of Scotland. In collecting he was often associated with Charles Bailey and William Lowndes Notcutt.

The Compositae genus Scalesia was intended to commemorate the name 'Stables', but the taxonomist Arnott mistakenly cited his name as "W. Scales Esq., Cawdor Castle, Elginshire", discovering his error only after publication in 1836, and noting in the margin of his description "His name is Stables - what a blunder!!!". And so the error remained. He was President of the Nairnshire Farming Society for four terms between 1836 and 1866, while his father served as President in 1828. On 19 May 1815 "a Savings Bank was established at Cawdor, with Mr Stables, factor for Lord Cawdor, as treasurer", referring to Stables' father.

== Family ==
On 7 February 1856 in Elgin, William Alexander Stables married Margaret Alicia Dunbar (1 August 1827 – 23 July 1908), daughter of Sir Archibald Dunbar, 6th Bt of Northfield, DL, JP. (30 June 1772 – 23 March 1847) and his second wife, married on 26 September 1822, Mary Brander (2 May 1790 – 5 May 1869), daughter of John Brander of Pitgaveny, Elgin. Stables' marriage to Margaret Dunbar produced children.

Margaret was an assiduous correspondent. Her brother, Laird of Pitgaveny, James Brander Dunbar-Brander (6 January 1825 – 1902), attained the rank of army Captain having served in India in the Madras Cavalry and in the Crimean War and wrote letters home to her from his posting in India with the Madras Cavalry. His son was also named James Brander Dunbar and wrote "first-hand accounts of schooling at Dalvreck and Rugby, big game hunting in Africa, the second Boer War and the Siege of Kimberley, the Great War, the home guard in Moray in WWII, entanglement with bureaucracy and the life and times of the Pitgaveny estate and its laird for the greater part of the twentieth century". His exploits inspired John Buchan's novel John Macnab.
