= Peperomia petiolata =

Conservation status
- Least Concern (IUCN 3.1)

Scientific classification
- Kingdom: Plantae
- Clade: Tracheophytes
- Clade: Angiosperms
- Clade: Magnoliids
- Order: Piperales
- Family: Piperaceae
- Genus: Peperomia
- Species: P. petiolata

Binomial name
- Peperomia petiolata Hook.f.

Synonyms
- Peperomia stewartii C.DC.

Species of plant

Peperomia petiolata is a species of flowering plant in the pepper family Piperaceae, native to the Galápagos Islands. An epiphyte, it is found in forests on many of the islands.
