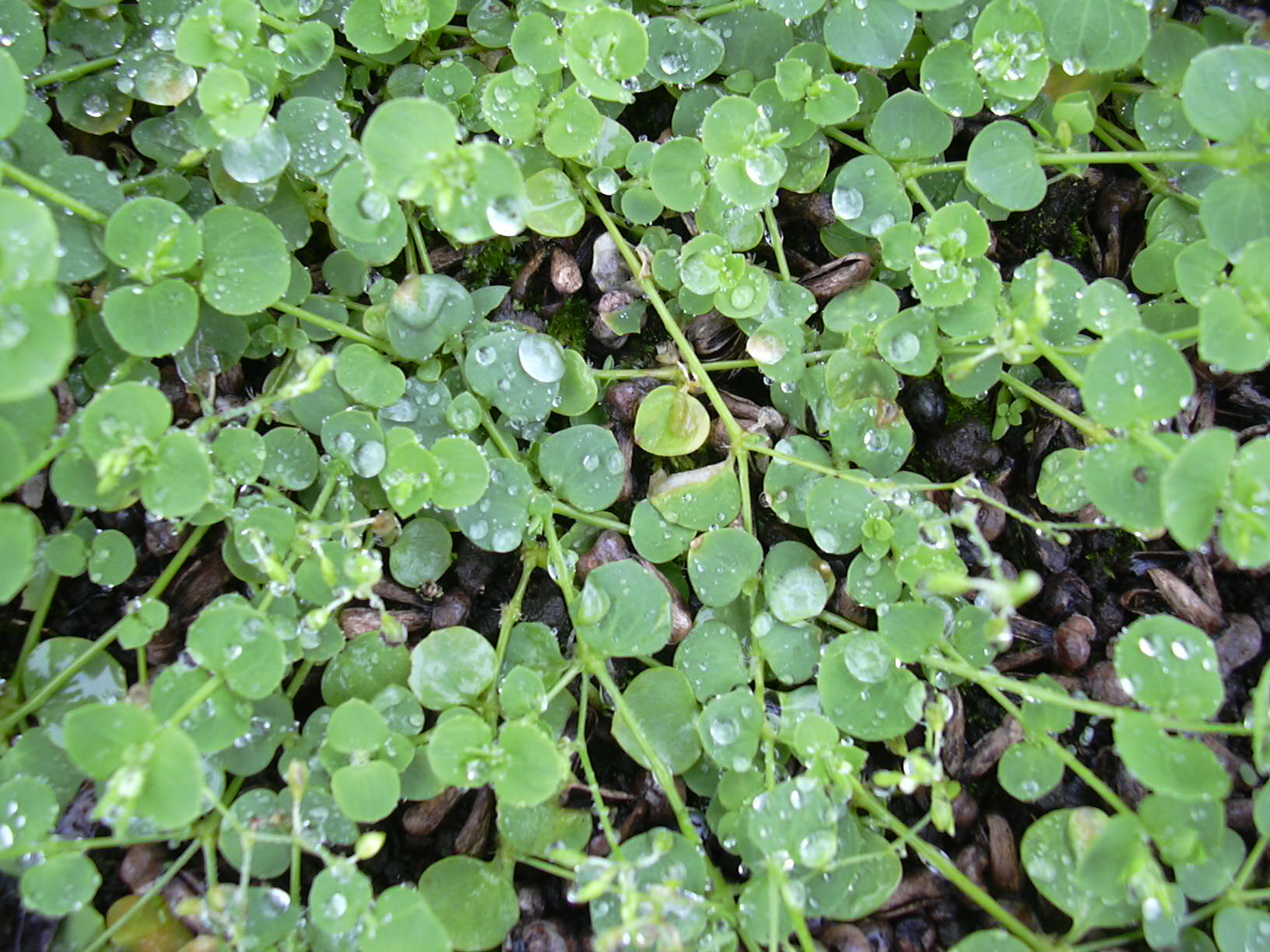
- Drymaria cordata

Scientific classification
- Kingdom: Plantae
- Clade: Tracheophytes
- Clade: Angiosperms
- Clade: Eudicots
- Order: Caryophyllales
- Family: Caryophyllaceae
- Genus: Drymaria; Willd. ex Schult.

Synonyms
- Mollugophytum M.E. Jones; Pinosia Urb.

= Drymaria =

Genus of flowering plants

Drymaria is a genus of plants in the family Caryophyllaceae. It contains many species including these from northeastern Mexico:

- Drymaria arenarioides
- Drymaria coahuilana
- Drymaria cordata
- Drymaria lyropetala
- Drymaria monticola
- Drymaria pattersonii
- Drymaria pratheri
