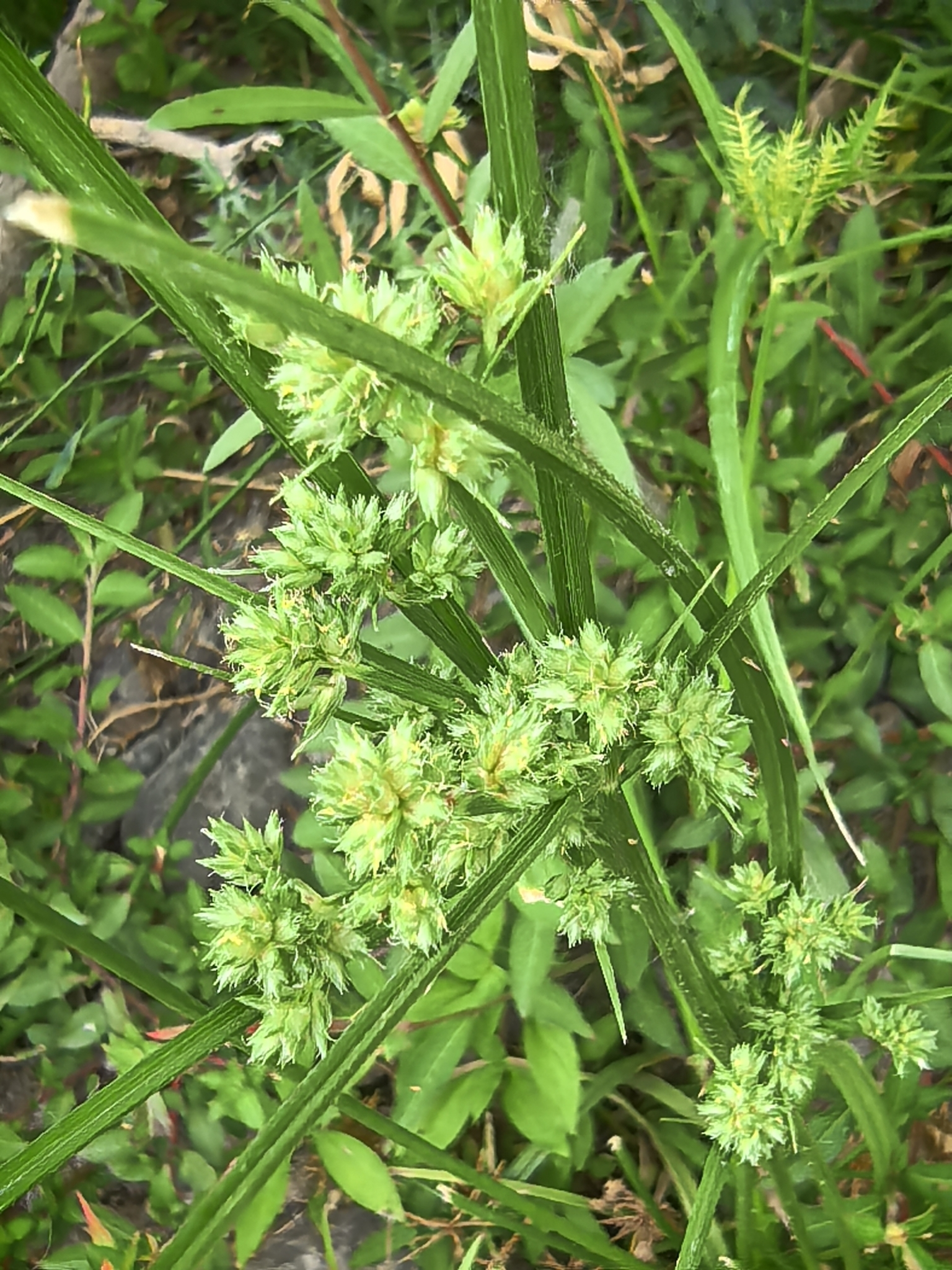
- In Mexico

Scientific classification
- Kingdom: Plantae
- Clade: Embryophytes
- Clade: Tracheophytes
- Clade: Spermatophytes
- Clade: Angiosperms
- Clade: Monocots
- Clade: Commelinids
- Order: Poales
- Family: Cyperaceae
- Genus: Cyperus
- Species: C. elegans

Binomial name
- Cyperus elegans L.

Subspecies
- Cyperus elegans var. breviradiata Maury, 1889; Cyperus elegans var. major Kük., 1936; Cyperus elegans subsp. rubiginosus (Hook. f.) Eliasson, 1965

Synonyms
- Cyperus elegans Baker, 1883

= Cyperus elegans =

Royal flatsedge

Species of plant

Cyperus elegans, the royal flatsedge, is a sedge species in the genus Cyperus from Central and South America.

== See also ==
- List of flora of the Sonoran Desert Region by common name
