= Trigonopterum =

Conservation status
- Least Concern (IUCN 3.1)

Scientific classification
- Kingdom: Plantae
- Clade: Tracheophytes
- Clade: Angiosperms
- Clade: Eudicots
- Clade: Asterids
- Order: Asterales
- Family: Asteraceae
- Subfamily: Asteroideae
- Tribe: Heliantheae
- Subtribe: Ecliptinae
- Genus: Trigonopterum; Steetz (1854 publ. 1855)
- Species: T. laricifolium

Binomial name
- Trigonopterum laricifolium (Hook.f.) W.L.Wagner & H.Rob. (2001)

Synonyms
- Macraea Hook.f. (1846), nom. illeg.; Lipochaeta laricifolia (Hook.f.) A.Gray (1862); Macraea laricifolia Hook.f. (1847); Macraea lancifolia Hook.f. (1847); Trigonopterum pontenii Andersson (1854 publ. 1855)

Genus of flowering plants

Trigonopterum is a genus of flowering plants belonging to the family Asteraceae. It contains a single species, Trigonopterum laricifolium, commonly known as the needle-leafed daisy. Its native range is the Galapagos Islands in Ecuador.
