= Scalesia aspera =

Conservation status
- Vulnerable (IUCN 2.3)

Scientific classification
- Kingdom: Plantae
- Clade: Tracheophytes
- Clade: Angiosperms
- Clade: Eudicots
- Clade: Asterids
- Order: Asterales
- Family: Asteraceae
- Tribe: Heliantheae
- Genus: Scalesia
- Species: S. aspera

Binomial name
- Scalesia aspera Andersson

Species of plant endemic to the Galapagos Islands

Scalesia aspera is a species of flowering plant in the family Asteraceae. It is found only in the Galapagos Islands of Ecuador. It is threatened by habitat loss.
