= Drymaria monticola =

Conservation status
- Critically Endangered (IUCN 3.1)

Scientific classification
- Kingdom: Plantae
- Clade: Tracheophytes
- Clade: Angiosperms
- Clade: Eudicots
- Order: Caryophyllales
- Family: Caryophyllaceae
- Genus: Drymaria
- Species: D. monticola

Binomial name
- Drymaria monticola J.T.Howell

Species of flowering plant

Drymaria monticola is a herb restricted to Santa Cruz in the Galapagos, where it is commonly found in the highlands. There is one doubtful record on Santiago in 1991. The extent of occurrence (EOO) is 45 square kilometres (45,000,000 m^{2}) (excluding Santiago). It occurs from 480–870 metres (1,570–2,850 ft) above sea level.

The plant is native to Ecuador and occurs in the humid zone. It is supposed to be threatened by invasions of Cinchona, Rubus and Melinis.
