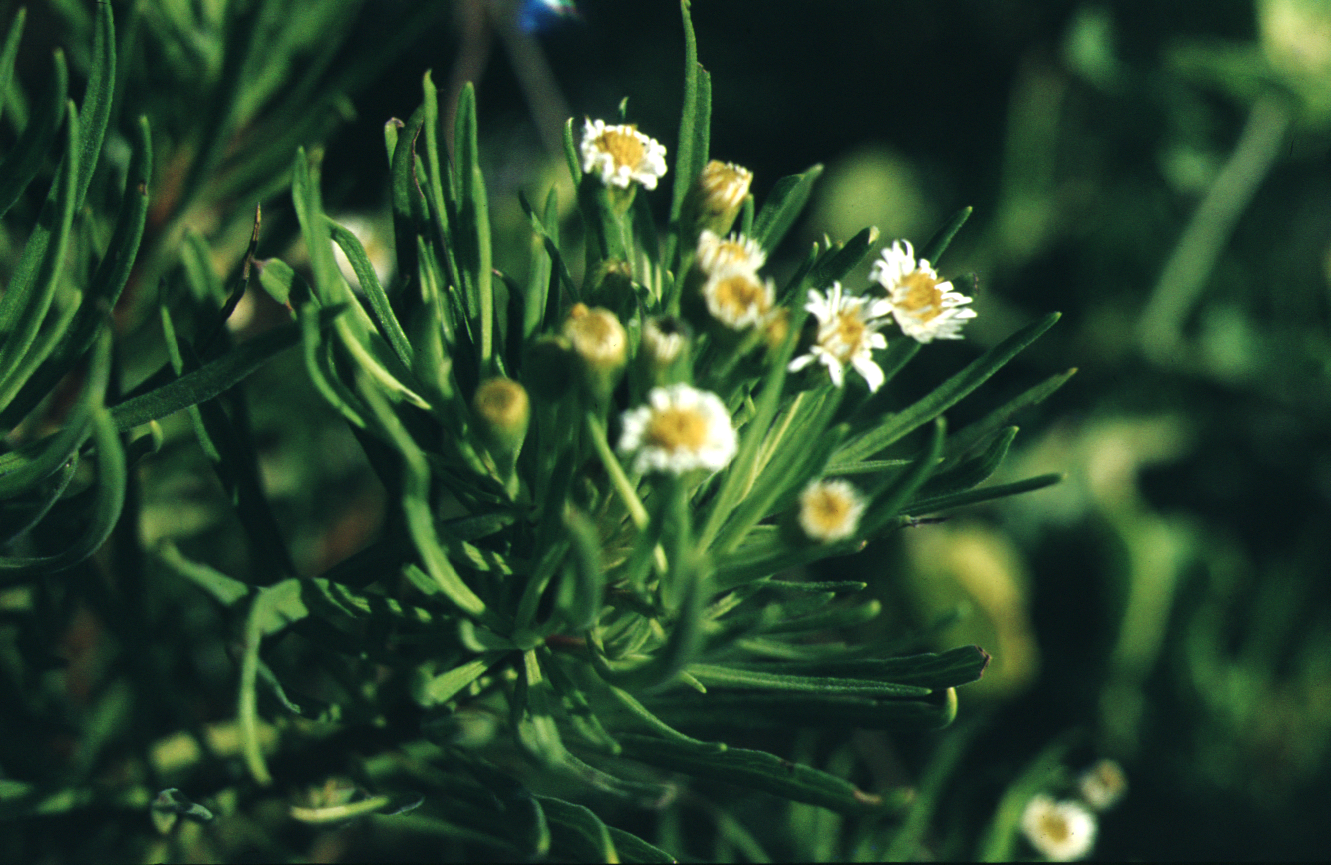

Conservation status
- Least Concern (IUCN 2.3)

Scientific classification
- Kingdom: Plantae
- Clade: Tracheophytes
- Clade: Angiosperms
- Clade: Eudicots
- Clade: Asterids
- Order: Asterales
- Family: Asteraceae
- Tribe: Heliantheae
- Genus: Scalesia
- Species: S. affinis

Binomial name
- Scalesia affinis Hook.f.

= Scalesia affinis =

Species of flowering plant

Scalesia affinis is a species of flowering plant in the family Asteraceae. It is endemic to the Galápagos Islands, Ecuador.

It is one of the most widely distributed Scalesia species and occurs on four major islands: Fernandina Island, Isabela Island (main distribution area), Santa Cruz Island and Floreana Island.

Populations from Santa Cruz and Floreana display some morphological and genetic divergence from populations of Fernandina Island and Isabela Island.
