= Scalesia cordata =

Conservation status
- Endangered (IUCN 2.3)

Scientific classification
- Kingdom: Plantae
- Clade: Tracheophytes
- Clade: Angiosperms
- Clade: Eudicots
- Clade: Asterids
- Order: Asterales
- Family: Asteraceae
- Tribe: Heliantheae
- Genus: Scalesia
- Species: S. cordata

Binomial name
- Scalesia cordata A.Stewart

Species of plant endemic to the Galapagos Islands

Scalesia cordata is a species of flowering plant in the family Asteraceae. It is found only in the Galápagos Islands of Ecuador. It is threatened by habitat loss.
