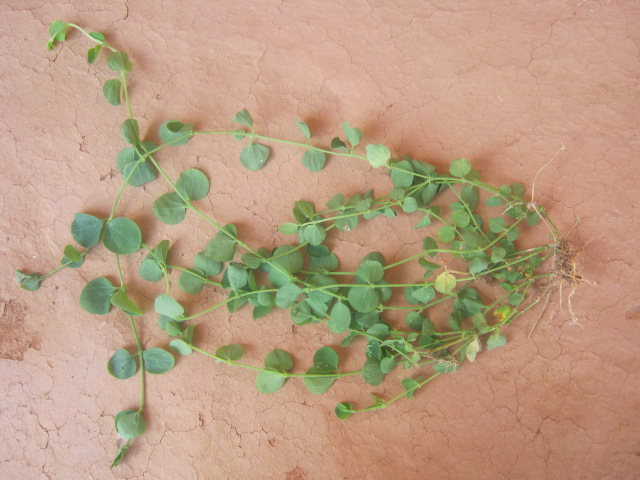
- In Nepal, uprooted
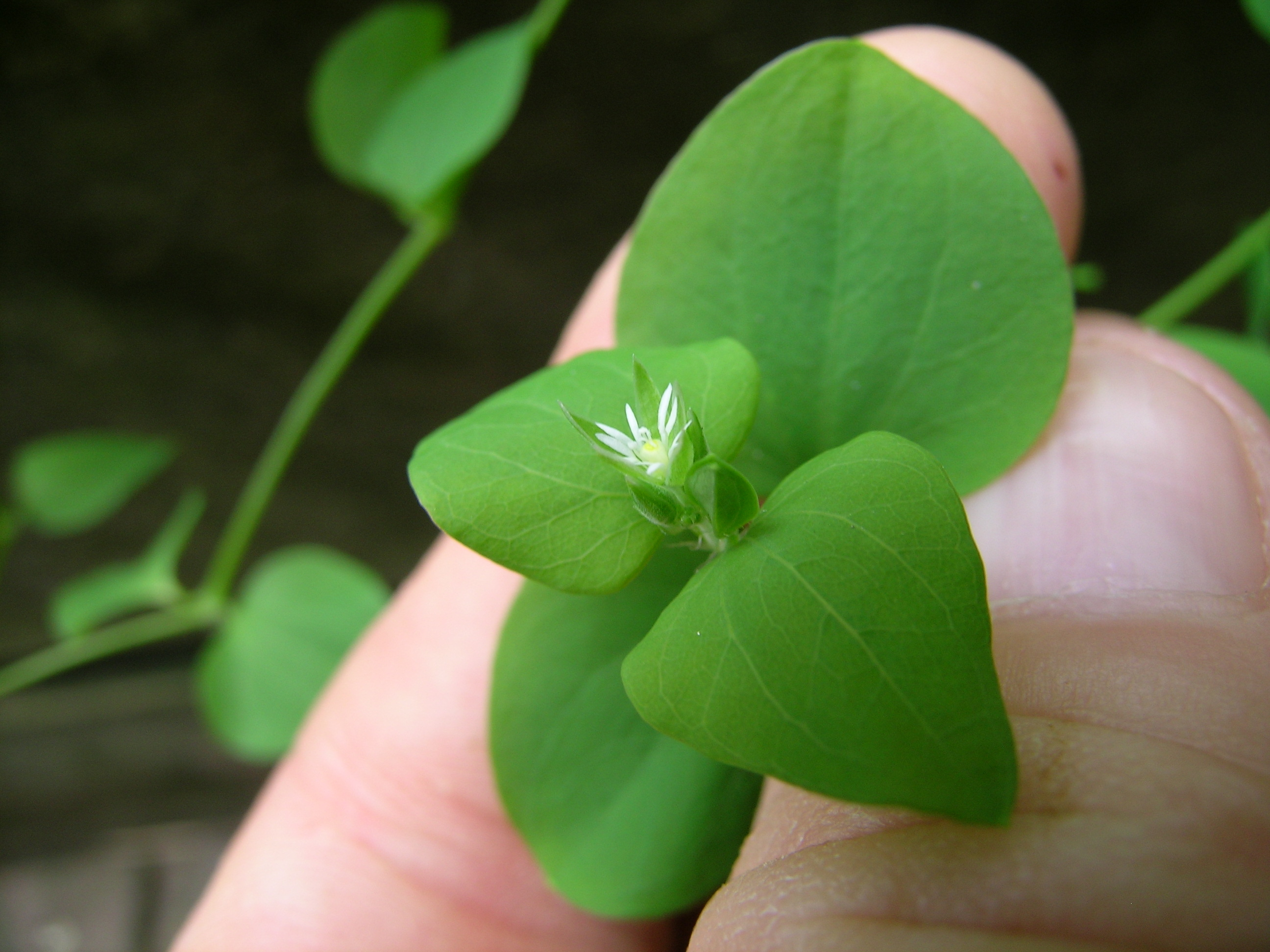
- Flower

Scientific classification
- Kingdom: Plantae
- Clade: Tracheophytes
- Clade: Angiosperms
- Clade: Eudicots
- Order: Caryophyllales
- Family: Caryophyllaceae
- Genus: Drymaria
- Species: D. cordata

Binomial name
- Drymaria cordata (L.) Willd. ex Schult.

Synonyms
- List: Alsine media Vell.; Alsine rotundifolia Stokes; Bufonia rotundifolia Buch.-Ham. ex Steud.; Cerastium cordatum (L.) Crantz; Cerastium cordifolium Roxb.; Drymaria adenophora Urb.; Drymaria cordata var. diandra (Sw.) Griseb.; Drymaria cordata var. pacifica Mizush.; Drymaria cordata var. puberula Triana & Planch.; Drymaria procumbens Rose; Drymaria sessilifolia Fiori; Holosteum cordatum L.; Holosteum diandrum Sw.; Loeflingia renifolia Lag.; Stellaria adenophora (Urb.) León; Stellaria adnophora (Urb.) León; Stellaria cordata Willd. ex D.F.K.Schltdl.

= Drymaria cordata =

Species of flowering plant

Drymaria cordata, the tropical chickweed, stangries, West Indian chickweed, or golondrina, is a species of flowering plant in the family Caryophyllaceae. It is native to moist habitats in Latin America and sub-Saharan Africa, and has been introduced to many places in the tropics and subtropics, including the southeast US, the Caribbean, the Indian Subcontinent, southern China, Japan, and a number of islands. It is known as one of the most aggressive weeds of the tropical and subtropical parts of the world.
