= Peperomia galapagensis =

Scientific classification
- Kingdom: Plantae
- Clade: Tracheophytes
- Clade: Angiosperms
- Clade: Magnoliids
- Order: Piperales
- Family: Piperaceae
- Genus: Peperomia
- Species: P. galapagensis

Binomial name
- Peperomia galapagensis Hook.f. ex Miq.

Species of plant

Peperomia galapagensis is a species of flowering plant in the Piperaceae (pepper) family. It is endemic to the Galapagos Islands.

== Description ==
Peperomia galapagensis is a succulent epiphyte.

== Range and habitat ==
Peperomia galapagensis is endemic to the Galapagos Islands where it grows in wet tropical regions.
