= Froelichia nudicaulis =

Conservation status
- Vulnerable (IUCN 2.3)

Scientific classification
- Kingdom: Plantae
- Clade: Tracheophytes
- Clade: Angiosperms
- Clade: Eudicots
- Order: Caryophyllales
- Family: Amaranthaceae
- Genus: Froelichia
- Species: F. nudicaulis

Binomial name
- Froelichia nudicaulis Hook.f.

Species of flowering plant

Froelichia nudicaulis is a species of plant in the family Amaranthaceae. It is endemic to the Galápagos Islands of Ecuador.
