= Cyperus grandifolius =

Conservation status
- Critically Endangered (IUCN 3.1)

Scientific classification
- Kingdom: Plantae
- Clade: Tracheophytes
- Clade: Angiosperms
- Clade: Monocots
- Clade: Commelinids
- Order: Poales
- Family: Cyperaceae
- Genus: Cyperus
- Species: C. grandifolius

Binomial name
- Cyperus grandifolius Andersson, 1855

Species of sedge

Cyperus grandifolius is a species of sedge that is native to parts of the Galápagos Islands.

== See also ==
- List of Cyperus species
