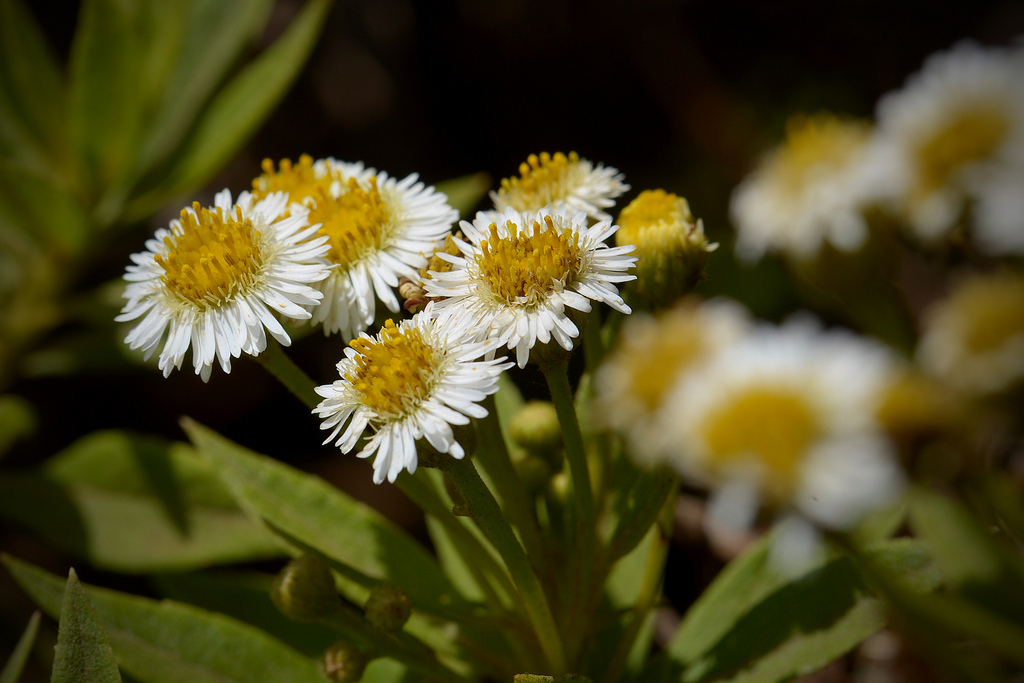

Conservation status
- Near Threatened (IUCN 2.3)

Scientific classification
- Kingdom: Plantae
- Clade: Tracheophytes
- Clade: Angiosperms
- Clade: Eudicots
- Clade: Asterids
- Order: Asterales
- Family: Asteraceae
- Genus: Darwiniothamnus
- Species: D. lancifolius

Binomial name
- Darwiniothamnus lancifolius (Hook.f.) Harling

= Darwiniothamnus lancifolius =

Species of flowering plant

Darwiniothamnus lancifolius is a species of flowering plant in the family Asteraceae. It is found only in the Galápagos Islands.
