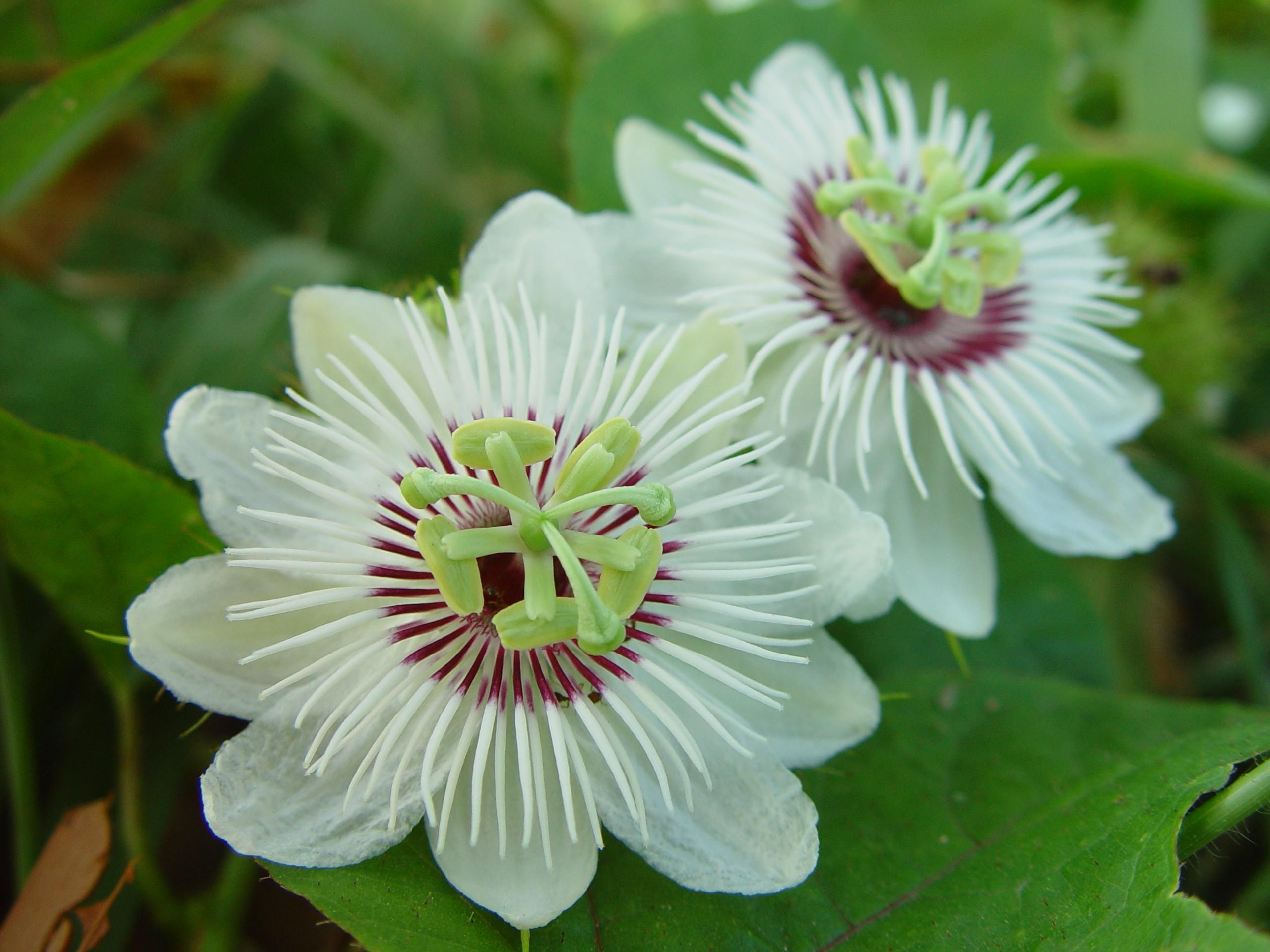
- Flowers
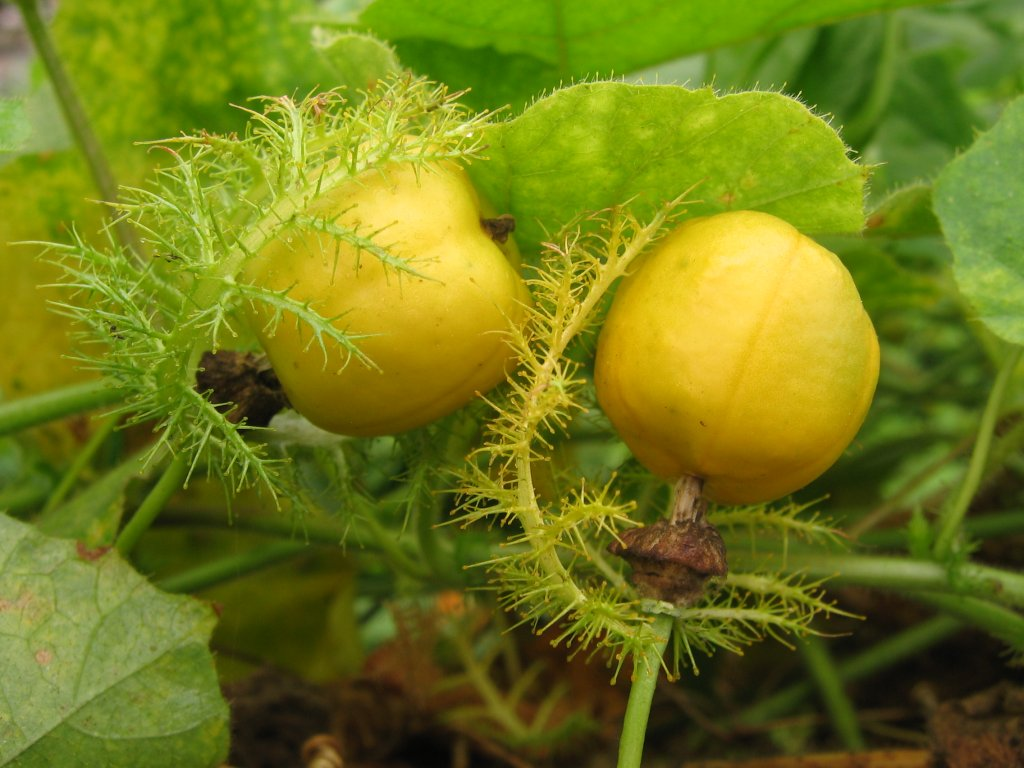
- Fruits

Scientific classification
- Kingdom: Plantae
- Clade: Tracheophytes
- Clade: Angiosperms
- Clade: Eudicots
- Clade: Rosids
- Order: Malpighiales
- Family: Passifloraceae
- Genus: Passiflora
- Species: P. vesicaria

Binomial name
- Passiflora vesicaria L.

= Passiflora vesicaria =

Species of plant

Passiflora vesicaria is a species of plant in the family Passifloraceae. It was first described by Linnaeus, later synonymized with Passiflora foetida as the varieties Passiflora foetida var. glabrifolia, P. foetida var. hispida, and P. foetida var. isthmia. Vanderplank restored it to full species status in 2013.

== Description ==
Like most Passiflora species, P. vesicaria is a climbing vine. The leaves are three-lobed with a serrate margin; the flowers are solitary with pinnatisect bracts and the corona in several rings. It is distinguished from P. foetida by having hairless to sparsely-haired fruit that ripen to yellow-orange to orange instead of hairy fruit that remain greenish when fully ripe.

== Range ==
Passiflora vesicaria is native to Central and South America, including Brazil, Bolivia, Peru, Ecuador, Colombia, Venezuela, Suriname, French Guiana, Guyana, Panama and Costa Rica; and to several Caribbean islands including Trinidad and Tobago, the Windward Islands, Leeward Islands, Puerto Rico, Jamaica, and Cuba. The variety P. vesicaria var. galapagensis is endemic to the Galapagos Islands.

It has been introduced in Florida in the United States, South and Southeast Asia, and to many tropical islands worldwide, including Aldabra, Borneo, Caroline Is., Cook Is., Fiji, Gilbert Is., Marianas, Nauru, New Caledonia, and Wake I.

== Habitat ==
Passiflora vesicaria grows primarily in the wet tropical biome.

== Etymology ==
Passiflora is derived from the Italian passio, meaning "suffering" and the Latin flora meaning "flower", in reference to the Passion of the Christ. Vesicaria means bladder, presumably referring to the form of the fruits.

== Taxonomy ==
Passiflora vesicaria contains the following varieties:

- Passiflora vesicaria var. vesicaria
- Passiflora vesicaria var. galapagensis – Galápagos Islands
