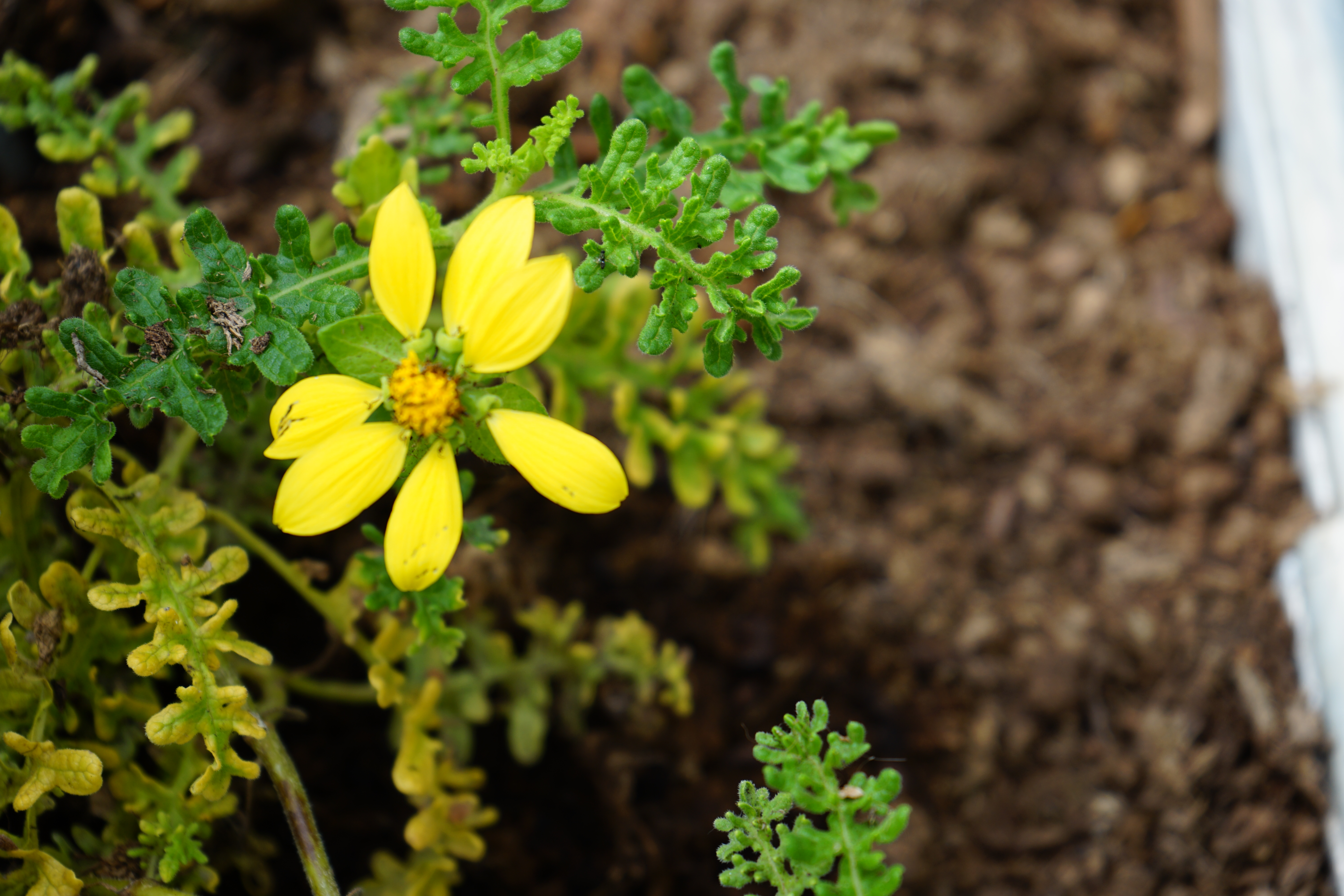

Scientific classification
- Kingdom: Plantae
- Clade: Tracheophytes
- Clade: Angiosperms
- Clade: Eudicots
- Clade: Asterids
- Order: Asterales
- Family: Asteraceae
- Genus: Lecocarpus
- Species: L. pinnatifidus

Binomial name
- Lecocarpus pinnatifidus Decne.

Synonyms
- Lecocarpus foliosus Decne.

= Lecocarpus pinnatifidus =

Species of flowering plant

Lecocarpus pinnatifidus, the wing-fruited leocarpus, is a species of flowering plant in the family Asteraceae. It is found in only on the Floreana Island of the Galápagos Islands.
