= Sicyocaulis =

Scientific classification
- Kingdom: Plantae
- Clade: Embryophytes
- Clade: Tracheophytes
- Clade: Angiosperms
- Clade: Eudicots
- Clade: Rosids
- Order: Cucurbitales
- Family: Cucurbitaceae
- Genus: Sicyocaulis; Wiggins (1970)
- Species: S. pentagonus

Binomial name
- Sicyocaulis pentagonus Wiggins (1970)

Genus of flowering plants

Sicyocaulis pentagonus is a species of flowering plant in the cucumber family, Cucurbitaceae. It is the sole species in genus, Sicyocaulis. It is endemic to the Galápagos Islands.
