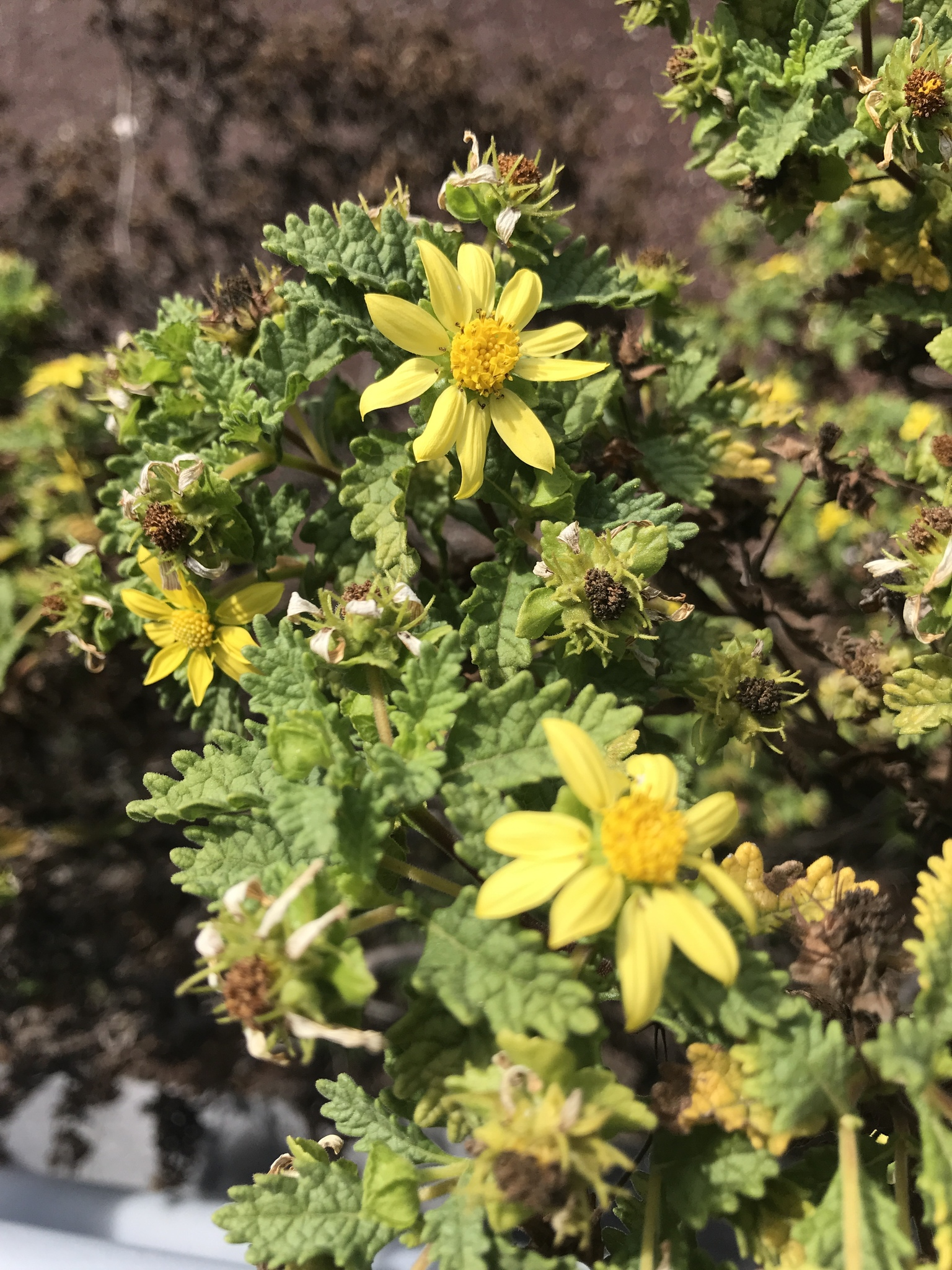

Conservation status
- Near Threatened (IUCN 2.3)

Scientific classification
- Kingdom: Plantae
- Clade: Tracheophytes
- Clade: Angiosperms
- Clade: Eudicots
- Clade: Asterids
- Order: Asterales
- Family: Asteraceae
- Genus: Lecocarpus
- Species: L. darwinii

Binomial name
- Lecocarpus darwinii H.Adseren

= Lecocarpus darwinii =

Species of flowering plant

Lecocarpus darwinii is a species of flowering plant in the family Asteraceae. It is found only in Galápagos Islands, Ecuador.
