= Lecocarpus lecocarpoides =

Conservation status
- Vulnerable (IUCN 2.3)

Scientific classification
- Kingdom: Plantae
- Clade: Tracheophytes
- Clade: Angiosperms
- Clade: Eudicots
- Clade: Asterids
- Order: Asterales
- Family: Asteraceae
- Genus: Lecocarpus
- Species: L. lecocarpoides

Binomial name
- Lecocarpus lecocarpoides (B.L. Rob & Greenm.) Cronquist & Stuessy

Species of flowering plant

Lecocarpus lecocarpoides is a species of flowering plant in the family Asteraceae. It is found only in Galápagos Islands, Ecuador.
