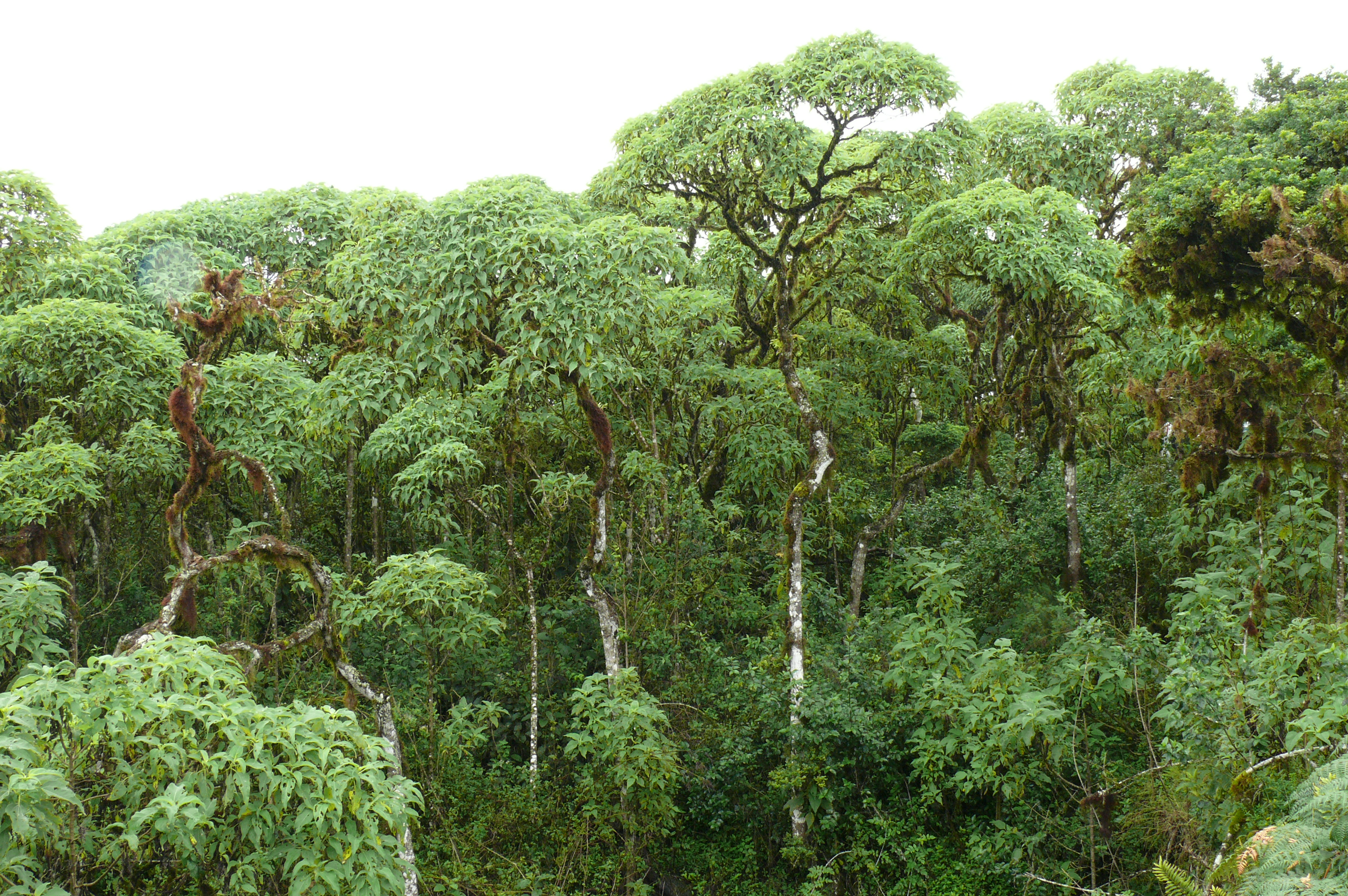
- Scalesia pedunculata on Santa Cruz (Galapagos Islands)

Scientific classification
- Kingdom: Plantae
- Clade: Tracheophytes
- Clade: Angiosperms
- Clade: Eudicots
- Clade: Asterids
- Order: Asterales
- Family: Asteraceae
- Subfamily: Asteroideae
- Tribe: Heliantheae
- Subtribe: Helianthinae
- Genus: Scalesia; Arn.

Species
- Scalesia affinis; Scalesia aspera; Scalesia atractyloides; Scalesia baurii; Scalesia cordata; Scalesia crockeri; Scalesia divisa; Scalesia gordilloi; Scalesia helleri; Scalesia incisa; Scalesia microcephala; Scalesia pedunculata; Scalesia retroflexa; Scalesia stewartii; Scalesia villosa

= Scalesia =

Genus of plants

Scalesia is a genus in the family Asteraceae endemic to the Galapagos Islands. It contains fifteen species that grow as shrubs or trees. This is unusual, because tree species are uncommon in Asteraceae. The genus Scalesia resulted from a blunder by Arnott who named it in honour of "W. Scales Esq., Cawdor Castle, Elginshire" but discovered after publication that the name should have read 'Stables', after Scottish botanist, William Alexander Stables (1810–1890).

All of the species have soft, pithy wood. Scalesia species have been called "the Darwin's finches of the plant world" because they show a similarly dramatic pattern of adaptive radiation.

One of the largest and most widespread species is Scalesia pedunculata – a large tree which grows up to 15 to 20 metres tall, reaching maturity in a few years time. These trees typically grow in dense stands of the same species and age. They die around the same time, and then a new generation of seedlings grows up in the same place. The largest stands of Scalesia pedunculata are found on the humid windward sides of Santa Cruz, San Cristóbal, Santiago and Floreana islands, at an elevation of 400–700 m. The best known and most visited stand is on Santa Cruz Island, and is crossed by a road.

Scalesia atractyloides and S. stewartii are two small tree species, very similar to each other.
