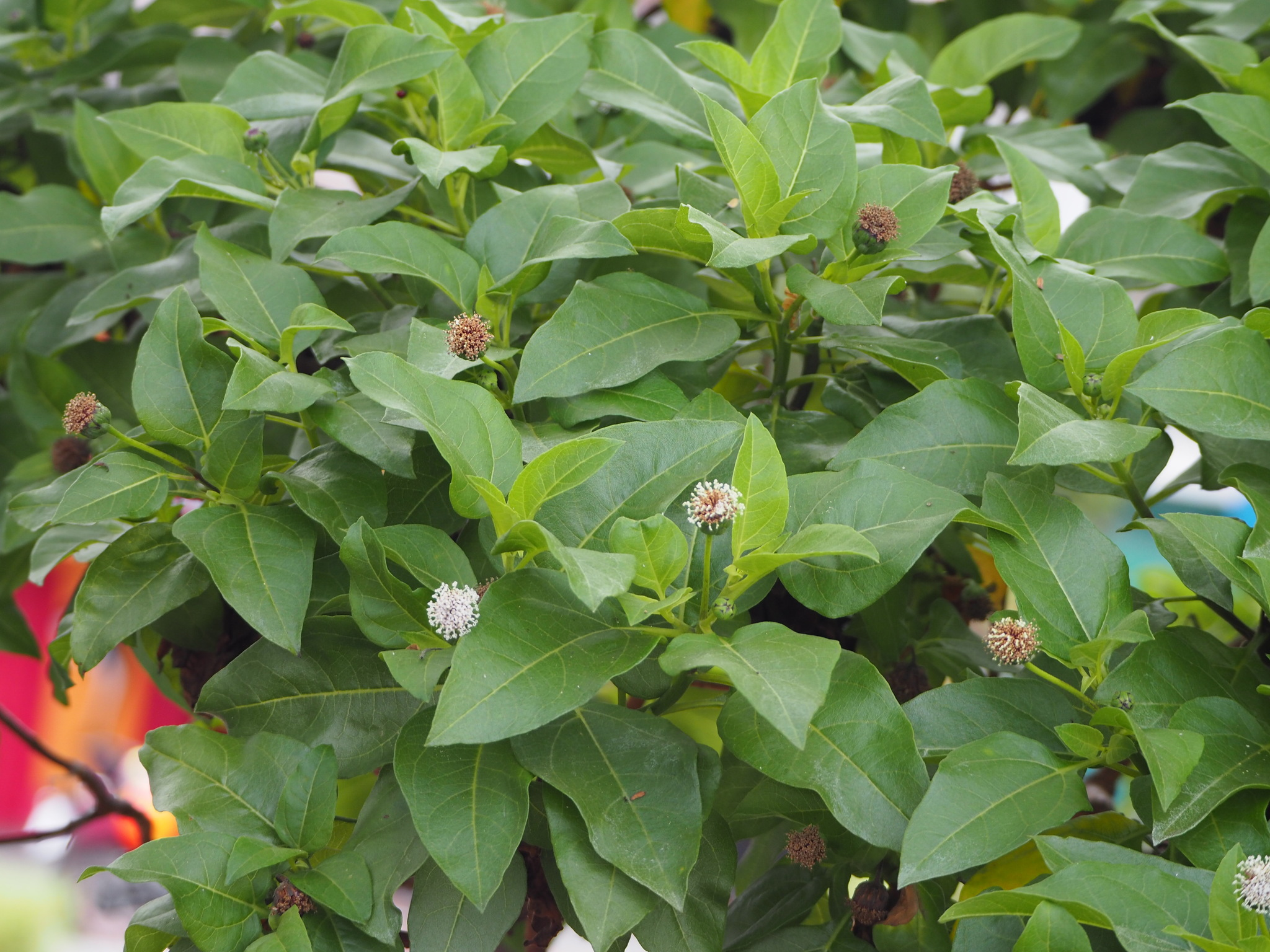

Conservation status
- Critically Endangered (IUCN 3.1)

Scientific classification
- Kingdom: Plantae
- Clade: Tracheophytes
- Clade: Angiosperms
- Clade: Eudicots
- Clade: Asterids
- Order: Asterales
- Family: Asteraceae
- Tribe: Heliantheae
- Genus: Scalesia
- Species: S. gordilloi

Binomial name
- Scalesia gordilloi O.Hamann & Wium-Andersen

= Scalesia gordilloi =

Species of plant endemic to the Galapagos Islands

Scalesia gordilloi is a species of flowering plant in the family Asteraceae. It is endemic to the Galápagos Islands, where it is limited to a single location on San Cristóbal Island.
