= Erigeron alternifolius =

Conservation status
- Vulnerable (IUCN 2.3)

Scientific classification
- Kingdom: Plantae
- Clade: Tracheophytes
- Clade: Angiosperms
- Clade: Eudicots
- Clade: Asterids
- Order: Asterales
- Family: Asteraceae
- Genus: Erigeron
- Species: E. alternifolius

Binomial name
- Erigeron alternifolius (Lawesson & Adsersen) N.Andrus & Tye

Synonyms
- Darwiniothamnus alternifolius Lawesson & Adsersen

Species of flowering plant

Erigeron alternifolius is a species of flowering plant in the family Asteraceae. It is found only in the Galápagos Islands.
