= Froelichia juncea =

Conservation status
- Vulnerable (IUCN 2.3)

Scientific classification
- Kingdom: Plantae
- Clade: Tracheophytes
- Clade: Angiosperms
- Clade: Eudicots
- Order: Caryophyllales
- Family: Amaranthaceae
- Genus: Froelichia
- Species: F. juncea

Binomial name
- Froelichia juncea B.L.Rob. & Greenm.

Species of flowering plant

Froelichia juncea is a plant species native to the Galápagos Islands of Ecuador. There are two subspecies of F. juncea: F. juncea subsp. juncea and F. juncea subsp. alata. F. juncea subsp. alata was first described by Thomas J. Howell.
