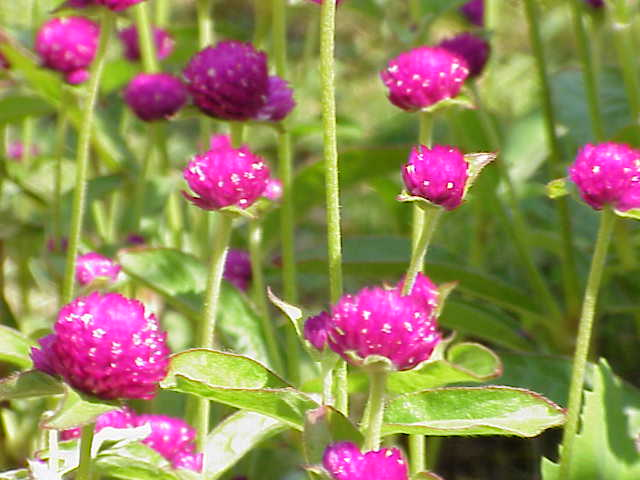
- Gomphrena globosa

Scientific classification
- Kingdom: Plantae
- Clade: Tracheophytes
- Clade: Angiosperms
- Clade: Eudicots
- Order: Caryophyllales
- Family: Amaranthaceae
- Subfamily: Gomphrenoideae; Schinz

Genera
- about 13 genera, see text

= Gomphrenoideae =

Subfamily of flowering plants

The Gomphrenoideae are a subfamily of the Amaranthaceae.

The stamens have anthers with only one lobe (locule) and two pollen sacs. Many species show C_{4}-photosynthesis pathway.

The center of diversity lies in Central America, Mexico and the dry forests and thorn bush savannas of South America.

== Systematics ==
The subfamily Gomphrenoideae was first published in 1893 by Hans Schinz (in: Engler und Prantl (Eds.): Die Natürlichen Pflanzenfamilien vol. 3, 1a, p. 97).

According to phylogenetic research by Sanchez Del-Pino (2009), the subfamily Gomphrenoideae Schinz is regarded as a monophyletic taxon with 19 genera and about 300-400 species. The traditional classification with two tribes (Gomphreneae and Pseudoplantageae) does not reflect the phylogenetic relationship in this group. Three clades can be recognized.:

=== Iresinoids ===
- Irenella Suess., with only one species:
  - Irenella chrysotricha Suess., in rain forests of Ecuador. Phylogenetically, it falls within Iresine.
- Iresine P.Browne (Syn.: Dicraurus Hook. f.): with about 45 species in North and South America.
- Woehleria Griseb.: with only one species
  - Woehleria serpyllifolia Griseb., on mountain coasts of Cuba. Phylogenetically, it falls within Iresine.

This is the sister clade of the two other clades.

=== Alternantheroids ===
- Alternanthera Forssk. (Syn.: Brandesia Mart.): with about 100-200 species, mainly in America, also in Africa and Australia.
- Pedersenia Holub: with about 10 species in tropical America.
- Tidestromia Standl.: with about 6 species in deserts of southern North America.

C_{4} carbon fixation evolved independently in the genera Alternathera, which also contains C_{3} and C_{3}–C_{4} intermediate species, and Tidestromia.

=== Gomphrenoids ===
- Blutaparon Raf. (Syn.: Philoxerus R.Br.): with about 5 species at shores of North and Middle America, West Africa, Micronesia and Japan, for example:
  - Blutaparon rigidum
- Froelichia Moench: with about 12 species in America.
- Froelichiella R.E.Fr., with only one species:
  - Froelichiella grisea R.E.Fr. in Brasília.
- Gomphrena L. (Syn.: Bragantia Vand.): with about 90 species in America and about 30 species in Australia. This genus is polyphyletic, so taxonomical changes have to be expected.
  - Gomphrena pulchella
  - Gomphrena decumbens
  - Gomphrena globosa
- Gossypianthus Hook.: with 2 species in southern North America.
- Guilleminea Kunth (Syn.: Brayulinea Small)
- Hebanthe Mart.: with about 7 species in tropical America.
- Hebanthodes Pedersen, with only one species:
  - Hebanthodes peruviana Pedersen in Peru.
- Lithophila Sw., with 2 species on Galapagos and the Caribic
- Pfaffia Mart.: with about 35 species in tropical America.
- Pseudogomphrena R.E.Fr., with only one species:
  - Pseudogomphrena scandens R.E.Fr. in Brasília.
- Pseudoplantago Suess.: with one species in Venezuela and one in Argentina.
- Quaternella Pedersen: with 3 species in Brasília.
- Xerosiphon Turcz.: with about 2 species in Brasília.

One large clade within this group, containing the genera Froelichia, Guilleminea, Blutaparon, some Gomphrena species, and probably Gossypianthus and Lithophila, has acquired the C_{4} carbon fixation pathway. Some of these C_{4} species occur at unusually high altitudes in the Andes, in cooler conditions than their C_{3} relatives.

== Photographs ==
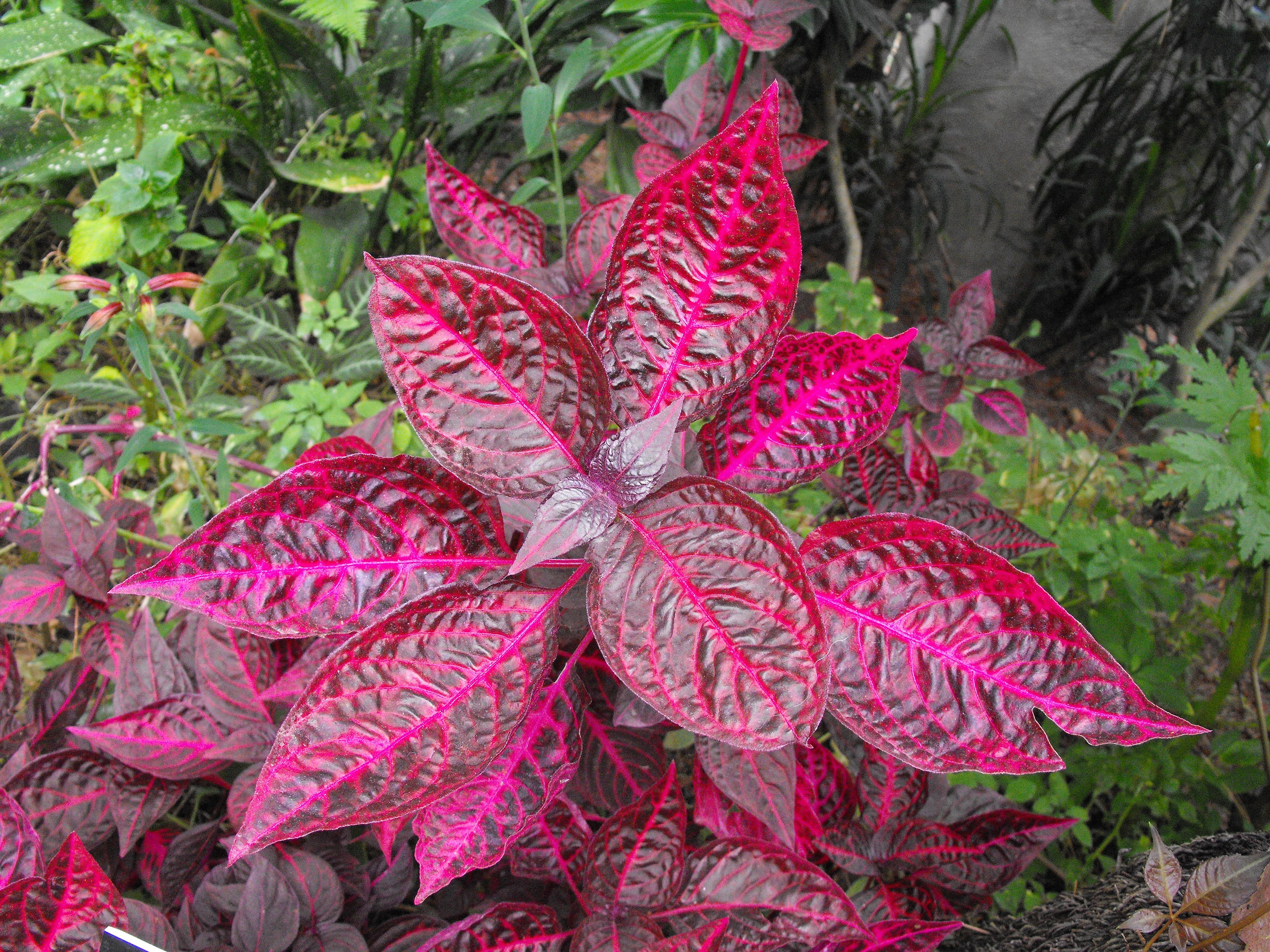
Iresinoids:
Iresine lindenii

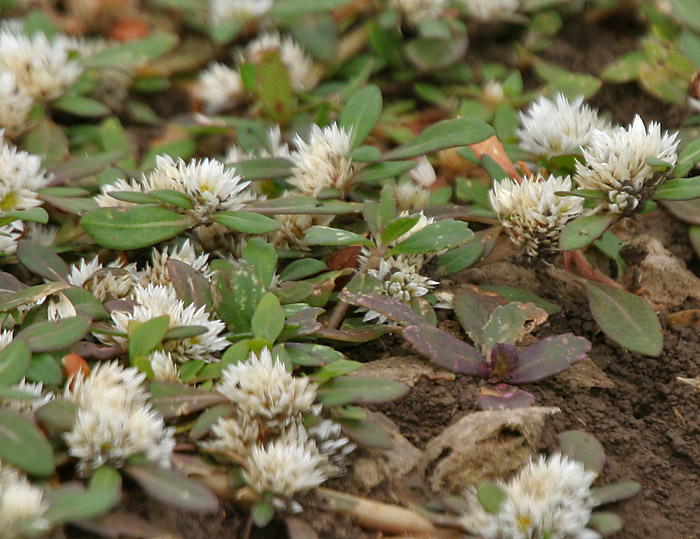
Alternantheroids: Alternanthera caracasana

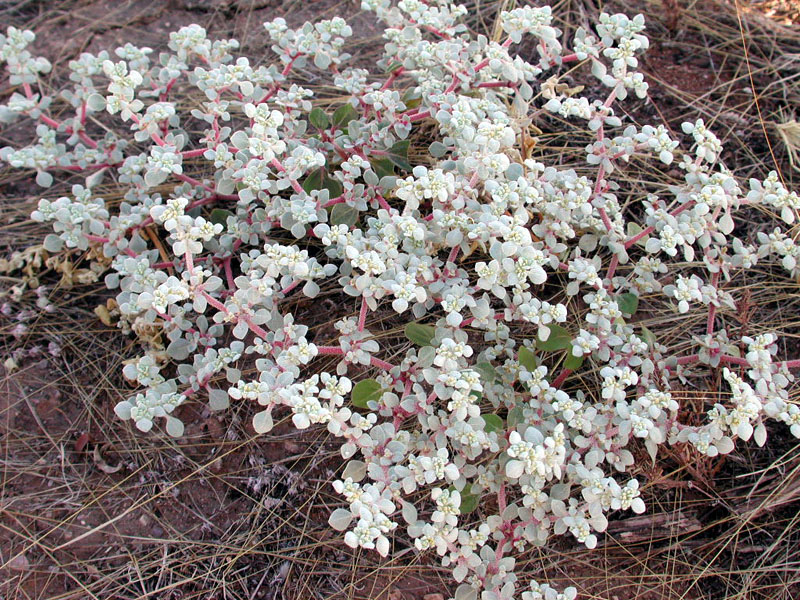
Alternantheroids:
Tidestromia lanuginosa

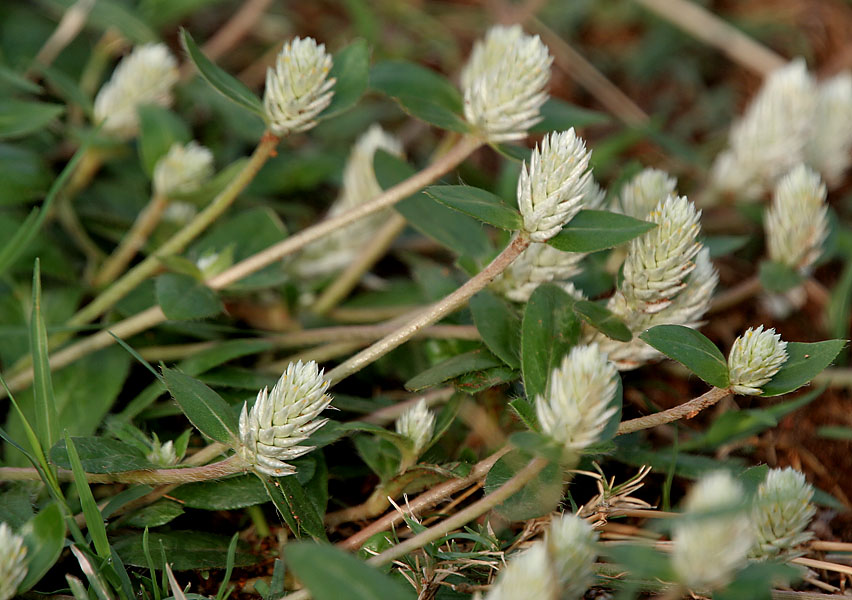
Gomphrenoids: Gomphrena serrata

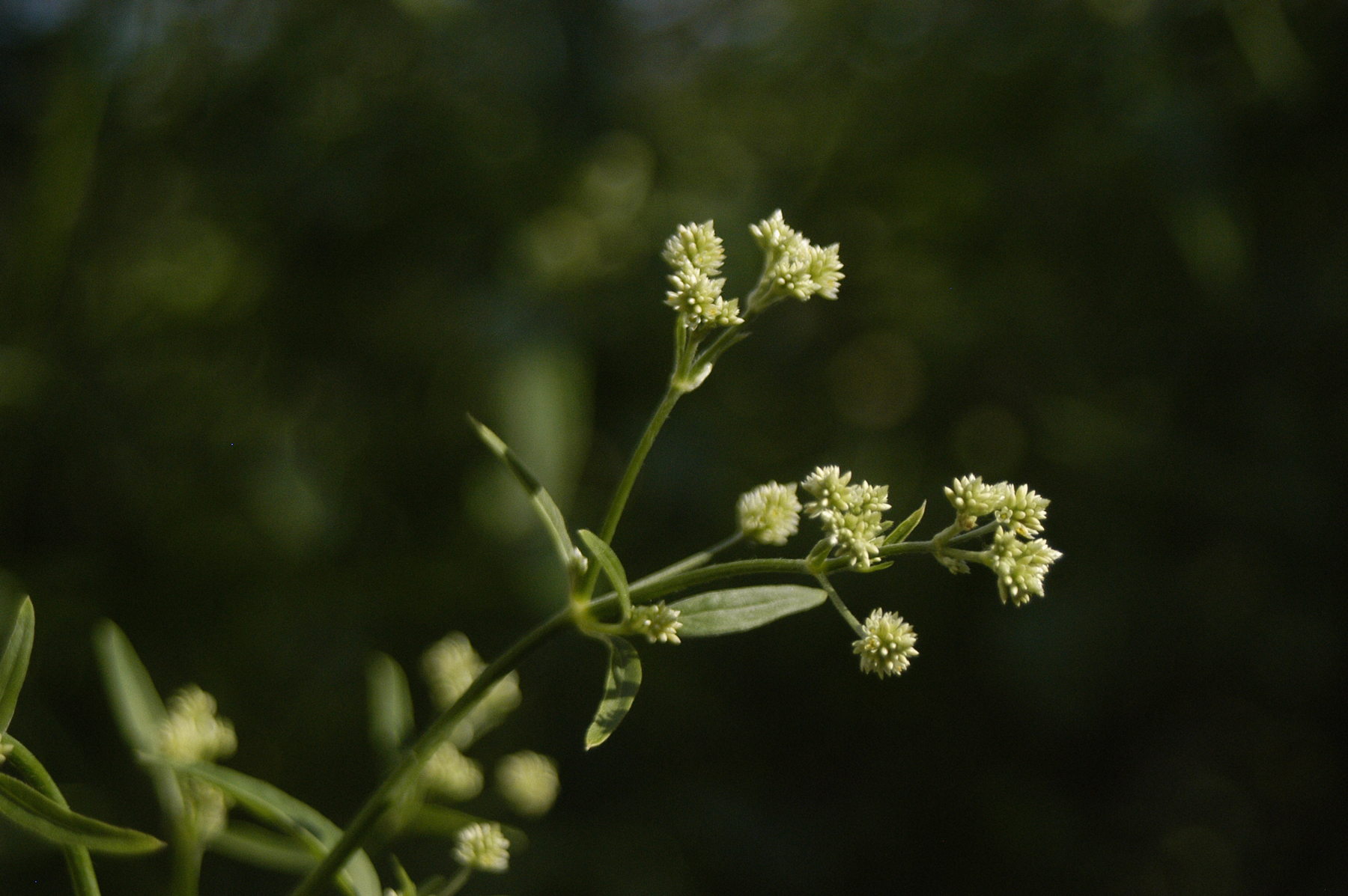
Gomphrenoids:
Pfaffia glomerata
