= Saltweed =

Saltweed may refer to:

- Any of various plants of the genus Atriplex
- Blutaparon vermiculare, whose common names include "saltweed"
