= Guill =

Guill is a surname. Notable people with the surname include:

- Antonio de Guill y Gonzaga (died 1768), Spanish colonial administrator
- Ben H. Guill (1909–1994), member of the U.S. House of Representatives from Texas
- Julianna Guill (born 1987), American actress
- Marshall Guill (1897–1931), American football and baseball player

== See also ==
- Guill., taxonomic author abbreviation of Jean Baptiste Antoine Guillemin (1796–1842), French botanist
