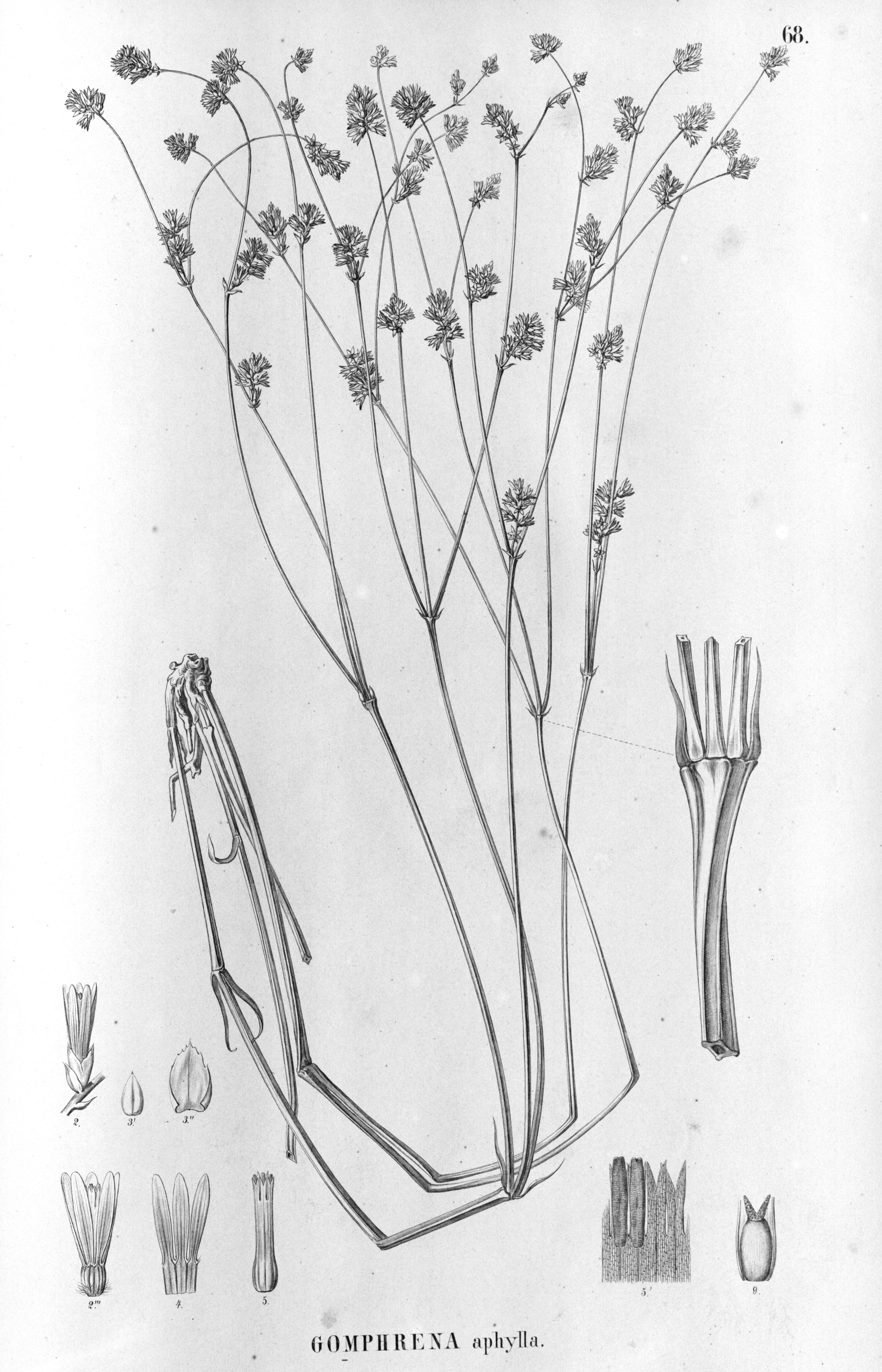
- Xerosiphon aphyllus

Scientific classification
- Kingdom: Plantae
- Clade: Tracheophytes
- Clade: Angiosperms
- Clade: Eudicots
- Order: Caryophyllales
- Family: Amaranthaceae
- Subfamily: Gomphrenoideae
- Genus: Xerosiphon; Turcz.

Species
- See text

= Xerosiphon =

Genus of flowering plants

Xerosiphon is a genus of plants in the family Amaranthaceae.

Species include:

- Xerosiphon angustiflorus
- Xerosiphon aphyllus
