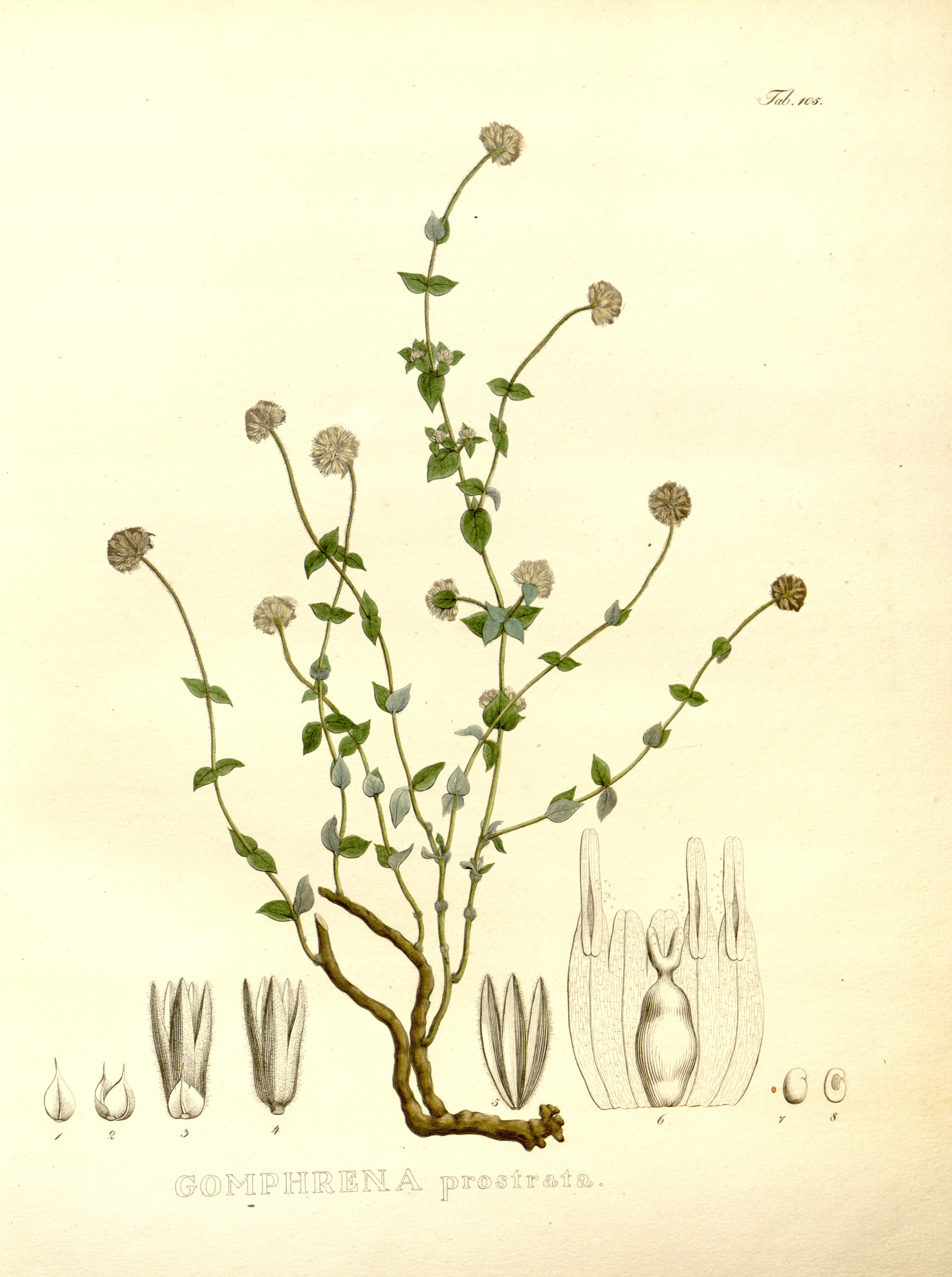

Scientific classification
- Kingdom: Plantae
- Clade: Tracheophytes
- Clade: Angiosperms
- Clade: Eudicots
- Order: Caryophyllales
- Family: Amaranthaceae
- Genus: Gomphrena
- Species: G. prostrata

Binomial name
- Gomphrena prostrata Mart.

= Gomphrena prostrata =

Species of flowering plant

Gomphrena prostrata is a plant native to Caatinga and Cerrado vegetation in Brazil, specially in Bahia and São Paulo. This plant is cited in Flora Brasiliensis by Carl Friedrich Philipp von Martius.
