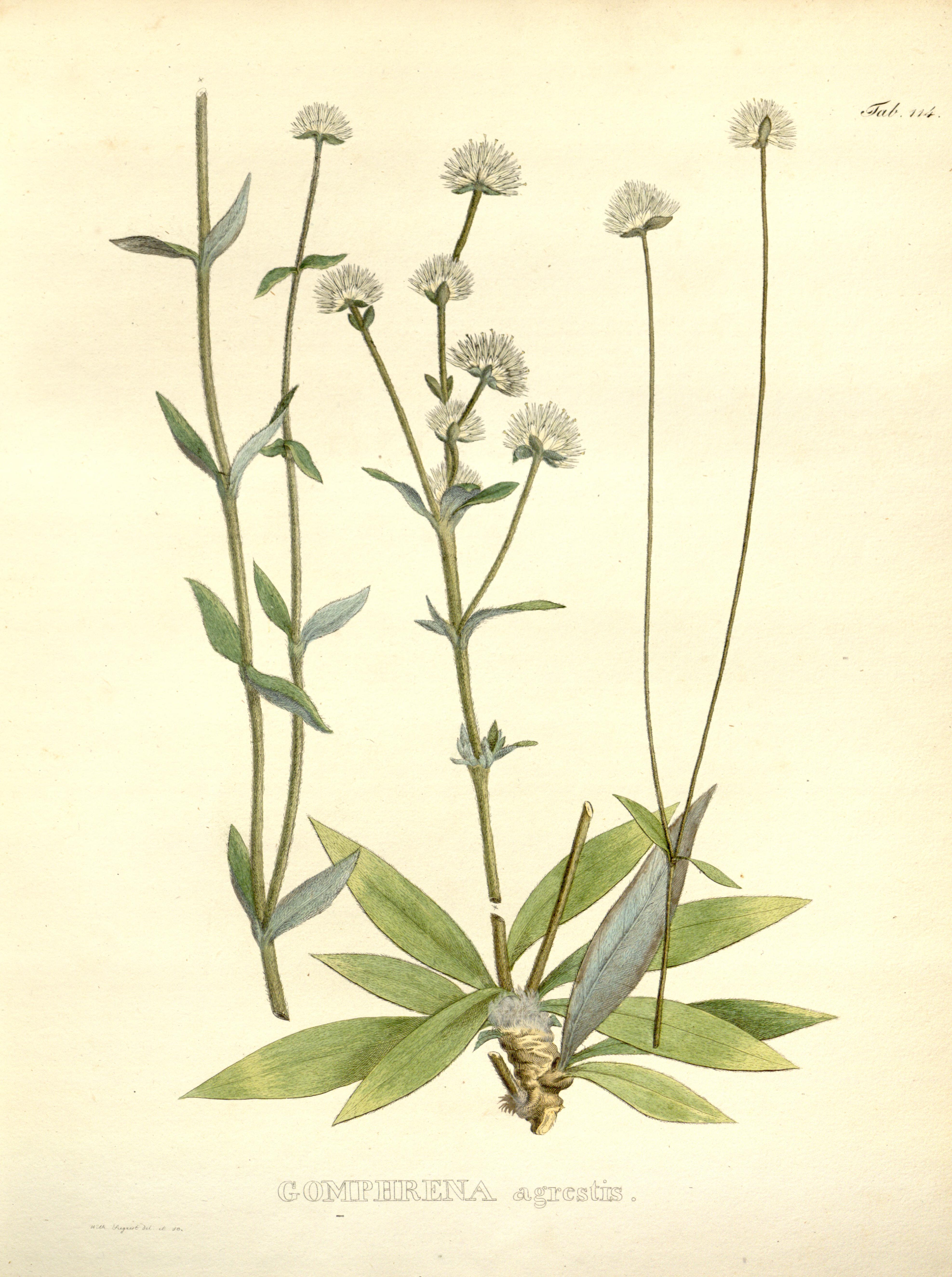

Scientific classification
- Kingdom: Plantae
- Clade: Tracheophytes
- Clade: Angiosperms
- Clade: Eudicots
- Order: Caryophyllales
- Family: Amaranthaceae
- Genus: Gomphrena
- Species: G. agrestis

Binomial name
- Gomphrena agrestis Mart.

= Gomphrena agrestis =

Species of flowering plant

Gomphrena agrestis is a plant native to Cerrado vegetation in Brazil. This plant is cited in Flora Brasiliensis by Carl Friedrich Philipp von Martius.
