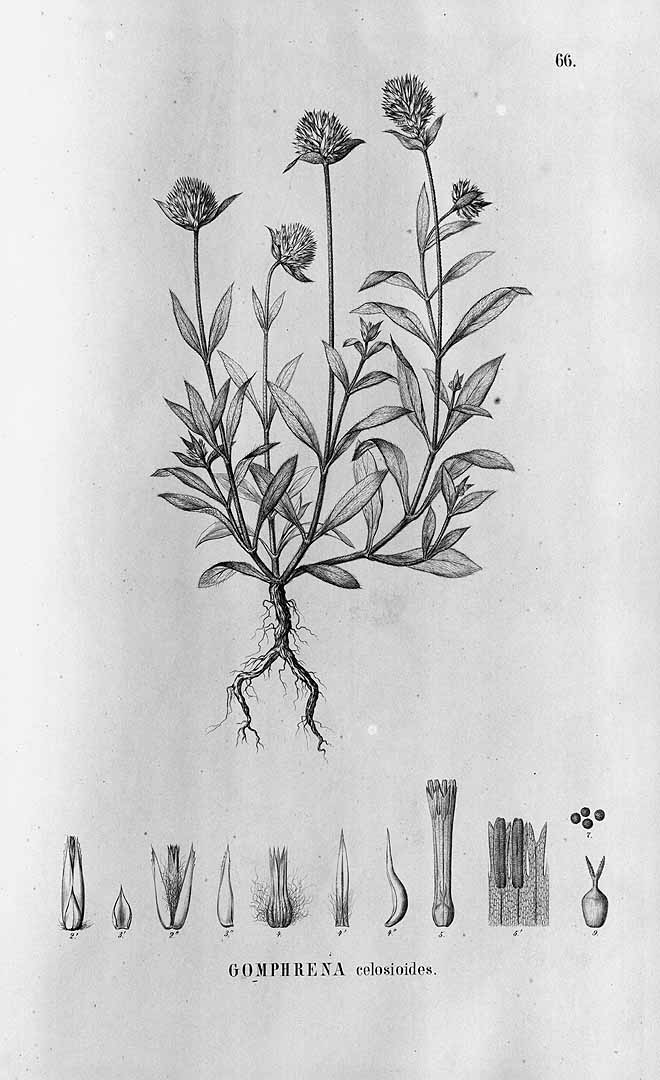

Scientific classification
- Kingdom: Plantae
- Clade: Tracheophytes
- Clade: Angiosperms
- Clade: Eudicots
- Order: Caryophyllales
- Family: Amaranthaceae
- Genus: Gomphrena
- Species: G. celosioides

Binomial name
- Gomphrena celosioides Mart.

= Gomphrena celosioides =

Species of flowering plant

Gomphrena celosioides ('gomphos'=club, 'celosioides'=resembling Celosia) is a herbaceous perennial flowering plant belonging to the family Amaranthaceae and a cosmopolitan pioneer plant of disturbed areas, and one of 51 species in the genus Gomphrena.

This much-branched, prostrate plant is an annual or short-lived perennial, with a deep taproot and is often mat-forming. The opposite, elliptical leaves have short, hairy petioles, are pubescent and about 4 cm (1.6 in) long. The flowers are in dense terminal spikes and grow on a woolly receptacle; perianth segments are papery, 4–6 mm (0.16–0.24 in) long, shining, and whitish to pink in colour. It has 2 stigmas and 5 stamens inserted opposite the sepals and joined into a 5-toothed staminal tube. The ovary is superior, developing into a single-seeded fruit. The seed is about 1.5 mm (0.059 in) in length, lentil-shaped, brown and glossy, and is routinely distributed by ants.

Originally from the Americas where it is native to Argentina, Bolivia, Brazil, Ecuador, Paraguay and Uruguay, it has become naturalised in Asia in Bhutan, China, Indonesia, Japan, New Caledonia, Philippines, Singapore, Sri Lanka, Papua New Guinea, Taiwan, Thailand, Vietnam, New Zealand, Christmas Island and Australia, and Hawaii in the Pacific region, while in the Africa region it is found in Botswana, Cameroon, Egypt, Eritrea, Eswatini, Ethiopia, Ghana, Guinea, Kenya, Lesotho, Madeira Islands, Malawi, Mauritius, Mozambique, Namibia, Réunion, Rwanda, Socotra, South Africa, Tanzania, Uganda, Zaire, Zambia and Zimbabwe.

== Phytochemicals ==
Analysis of this species has shown the presence of various compounds, including aurantiamide, and aurantiamide acetate, which is a selective cathepsin inhibitor, also produced by Aspergillus penicilloides. These compounds have shown their effectiveness against microorganisms, even in very small doses.

Plants from the Amaranthaceae are used in folk medicine for their nutritional qualities and for the treatment of various disorders such as gastrointestinal and respiratory problems, skin infections, as well as some infectious diseases, and as an abortifacient. Analysis has also revealed hydrocarbons, alcohols, steroids, terpenoids, ecdysteroids, flavonoids, saponins, amino acids, butacyanins, reducing sugar and ketoses.

Eating the plant affects the nervous system of horses, leading to lack of co-ordination, dragging of hooves and falling. Recovery is swift following exclusion of the plant from the diet.

== Gallery ==
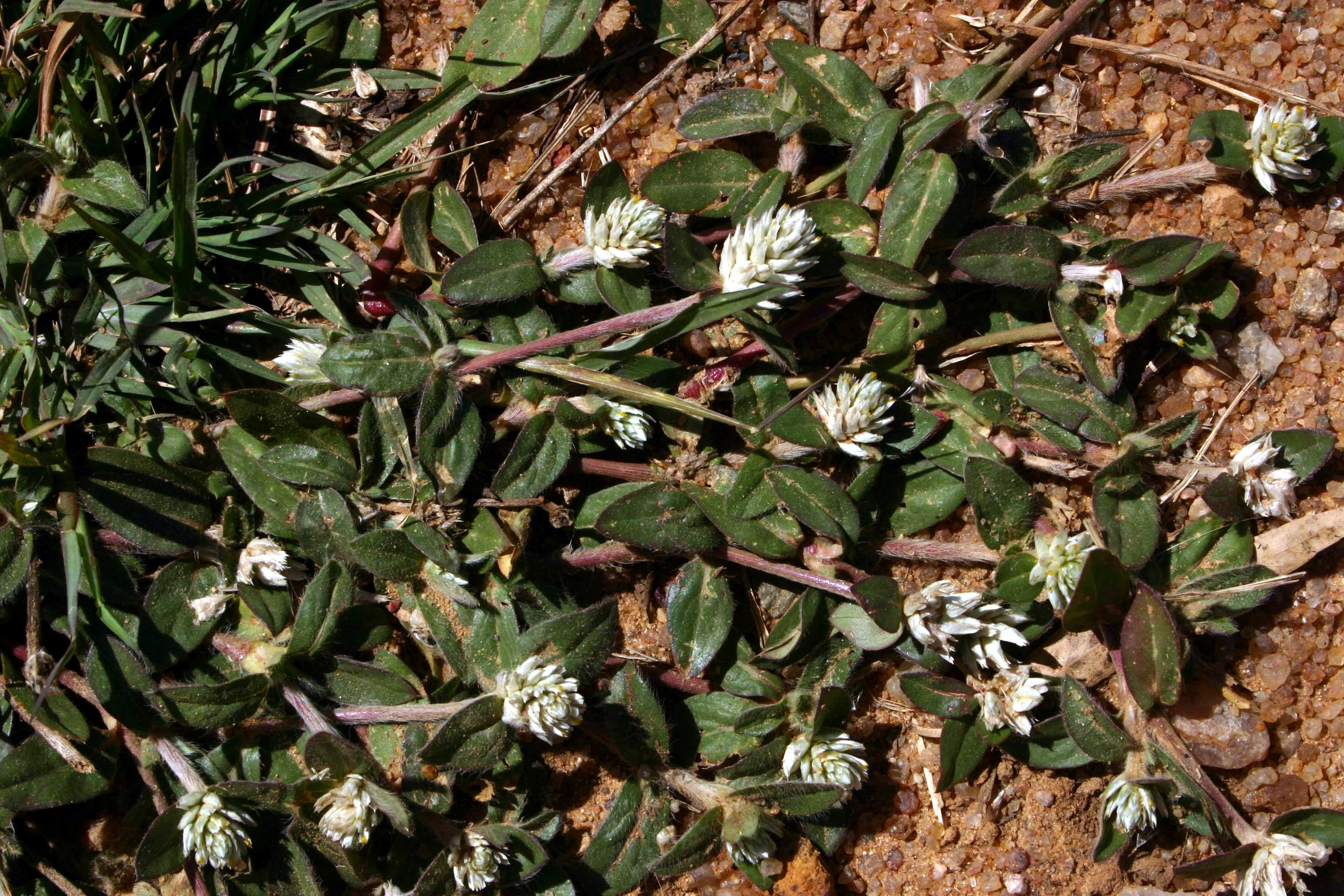
Habit

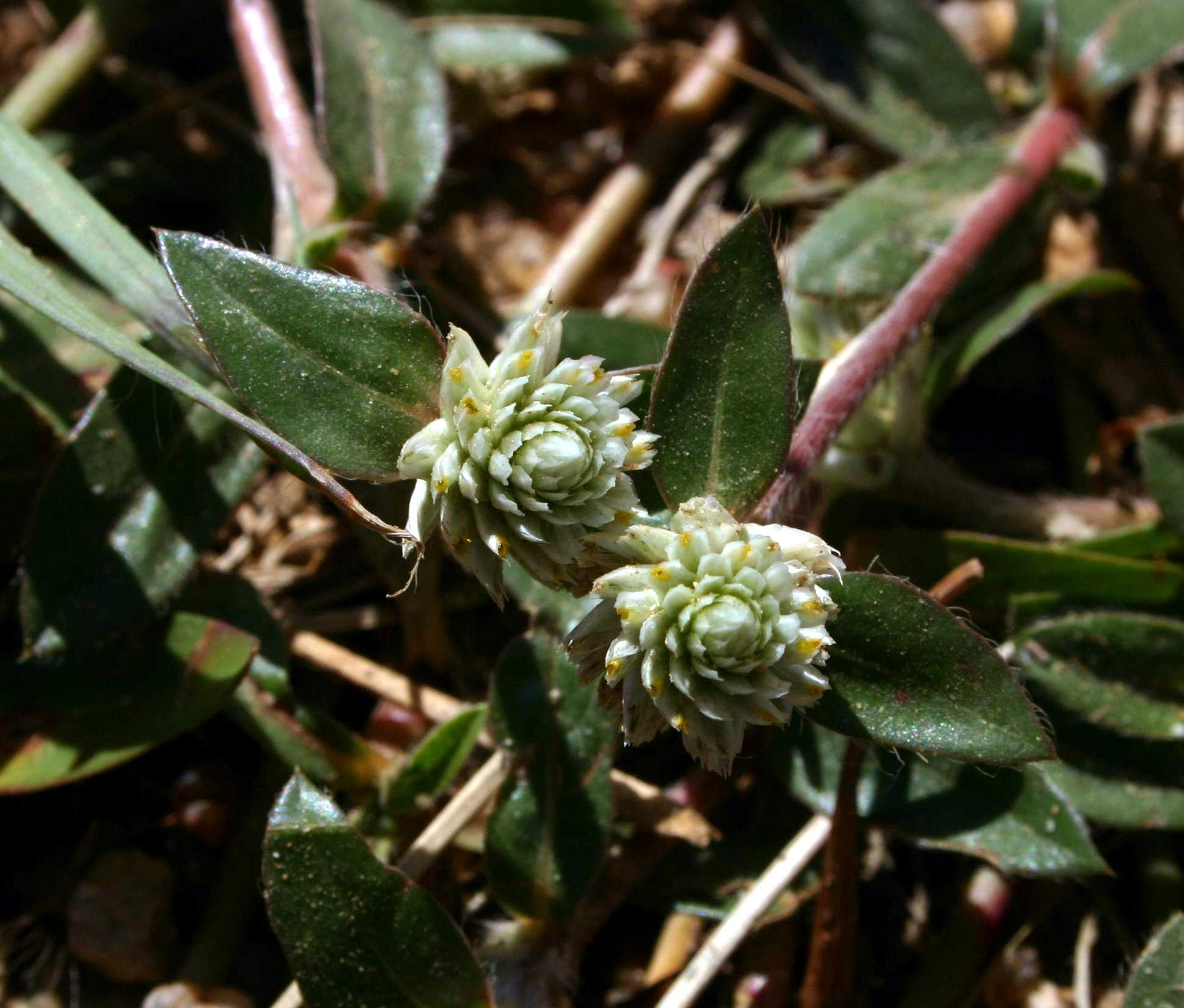
Flowers

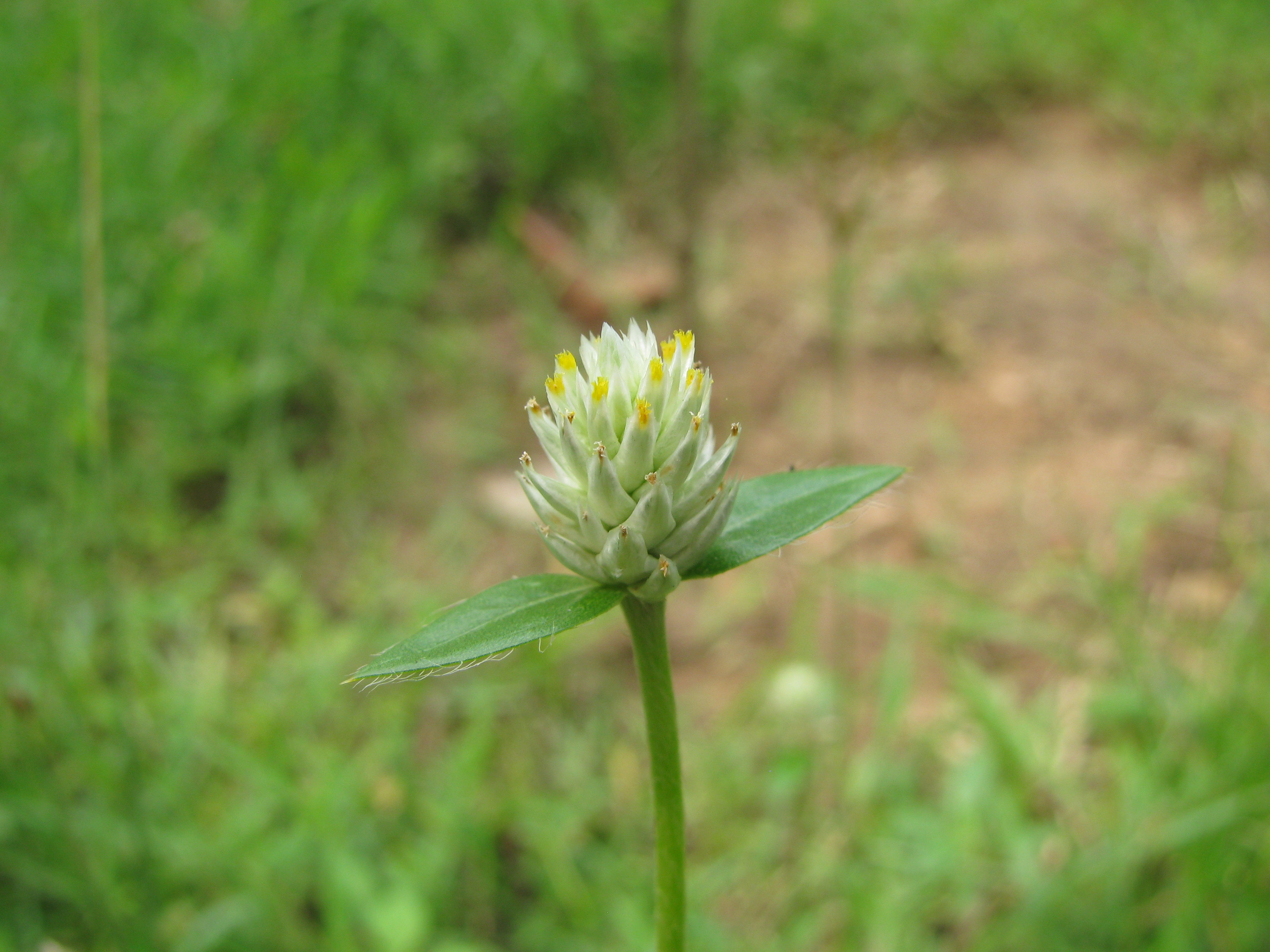
Flowers
