= Gomphrena radicata =

Conservation status
- Near Threatened (IUCN 2.3)

Scientific classification
- Kingdom: Plantae
- Clade: Tracheophytes
- Clade: Angiosperms
- Clade: Eudicots
- Order: Caryophyllales
- Family: Amaranthaceae
- Genus: Gomphrena
- Species: G. radicata

Binomial name
- Gomphrena radicata (Hook.f.) T.Ortuño & Borsch (2020)

Synonyms
- Alternanthera acaulis Andersson (1854); Alternanthera radicata Hook.f. (1847) (basionym); Alternanthera scirpoides Hook.f. (1880); Iresine radicata (Hook.f.) Kuntze (1891); Iresine scirpoides (Hook.f.) Kuntze (1891); Lithophila radicata (Hook.f.) Standl. (1915); Lithophila scirpoides (Hook.f.) Schinz (1934)

Species of flowering plant

Gomphrena radicata is a species of flowering plant in the family Amaranthaceae. It is endemic to the Galapagos Islands in Ecuador.
