= Gomphrena sonorae =

Scientific classification
- Kingdom: Plantae
- Clade: Tracheophytes
- Clade: Angiosperms
- Clade: Eudicots
- Order: Caryophyllales
- Family: Amaranthaceae
- Genus: Gomphrena
- Species: G. sonorae

Binomial name
- Gomphrena sonorae Torr.

Species of flowering plant

Gomphrena sonorae, the Sonoran globe amaranth, is an herbaceous perennial plant in the amaranth family (Amaranthaceae) found in the Sonoran Desert. When dried, the translucent flowers are used to add accent to dry flower arrangements.
