= Gomphrena pohlii =

Scientific classification
- Kingdom: Plantae
- Clade: Tracheophytes
- Clade: Angiosperms
- Clade: Eudicots
- Order: Caryophyllales
- Family: Amaranthaceae
- Genus: Gomphrena
- Species: G. pohlii

Binomial name
- Gomphrena pohlii Moq.

Species of flowering plant

Gomphrena pohlii is a plant native to Cerrado vegetation in Brazil, specially in São Paulo. This plant is cited in Flora Brasiliensis by Carl Friedrich Philipp von Martius.
