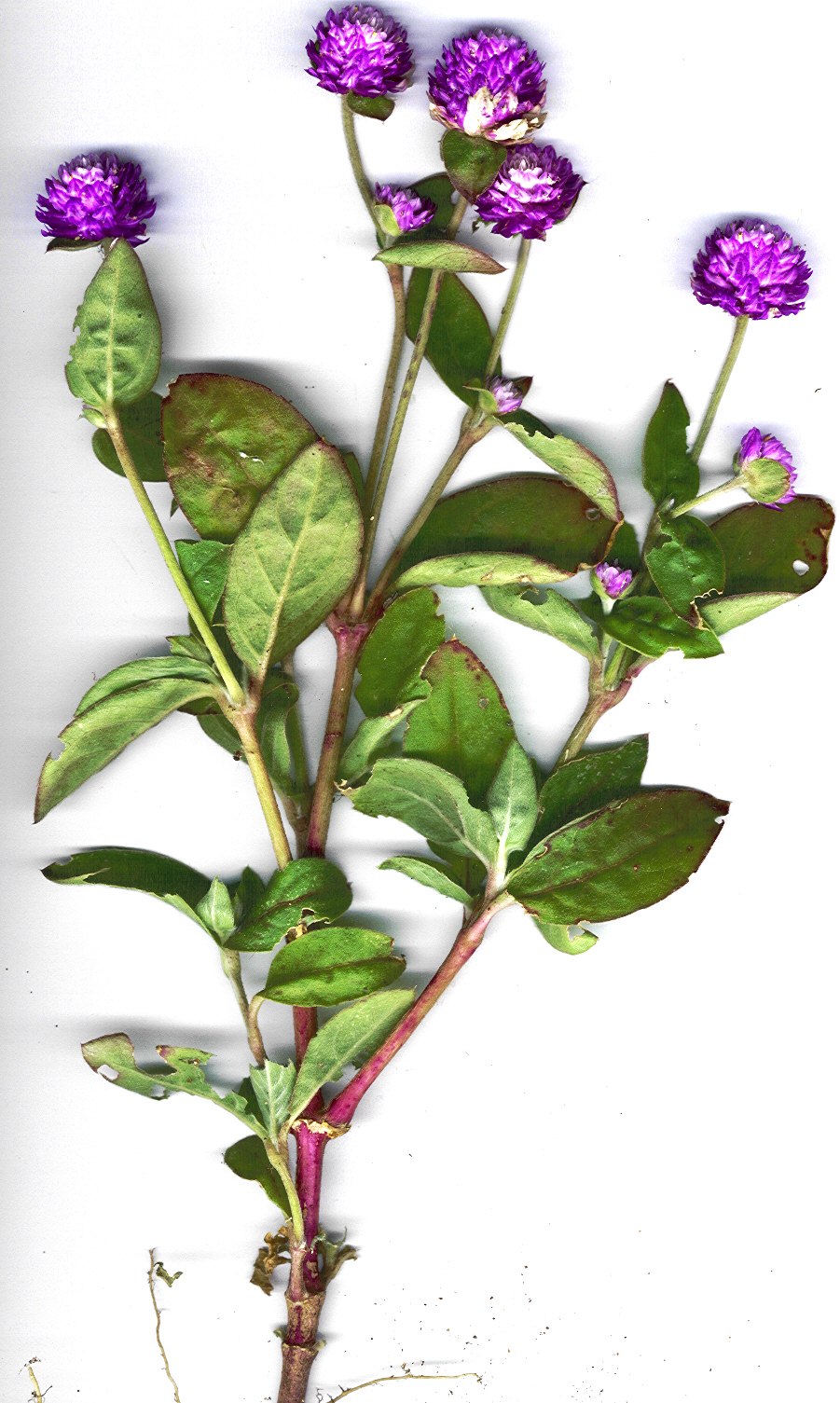
- Gomphrena globosa

Scientific classification
- Kingdom: Plantae
- Clade: Tracheophytes
- Clade: Angiosperms
- Clade: Eudicots
- Order: Caryophyllales
- Family: Amaranthaceae
- Subfamily: Gomphrenoideae
- Genus: Gomphrena; L. (1753)

Species
- 139; see text

Synonyms
- Amaranthoides Mill. (1754); Blutaparon Raf. (1838); Bragantia Vand. (1771); Caraxeron Vaill. ex Raf. (1837), nom. superfl.; Chlamyphorus Klatt (1889); Chnoanthus Phil. (1862); Coluppa Adans. (1763); Lithophila Sw. (1788); Litophila Sw. (1788), orth. var.; Ninanga Raf. (1837), nom. illeg.; Philoxerus R.Br. (1810); Pseudogomphrena R.E.Fr. (1921); Schultesia Schrad. (1821); Sedinha Mure (1849); Wadapus Raf. (1837); Xeraea L. ex Kuntze (1891)

= Gomphrena =

Genus of flowering plants

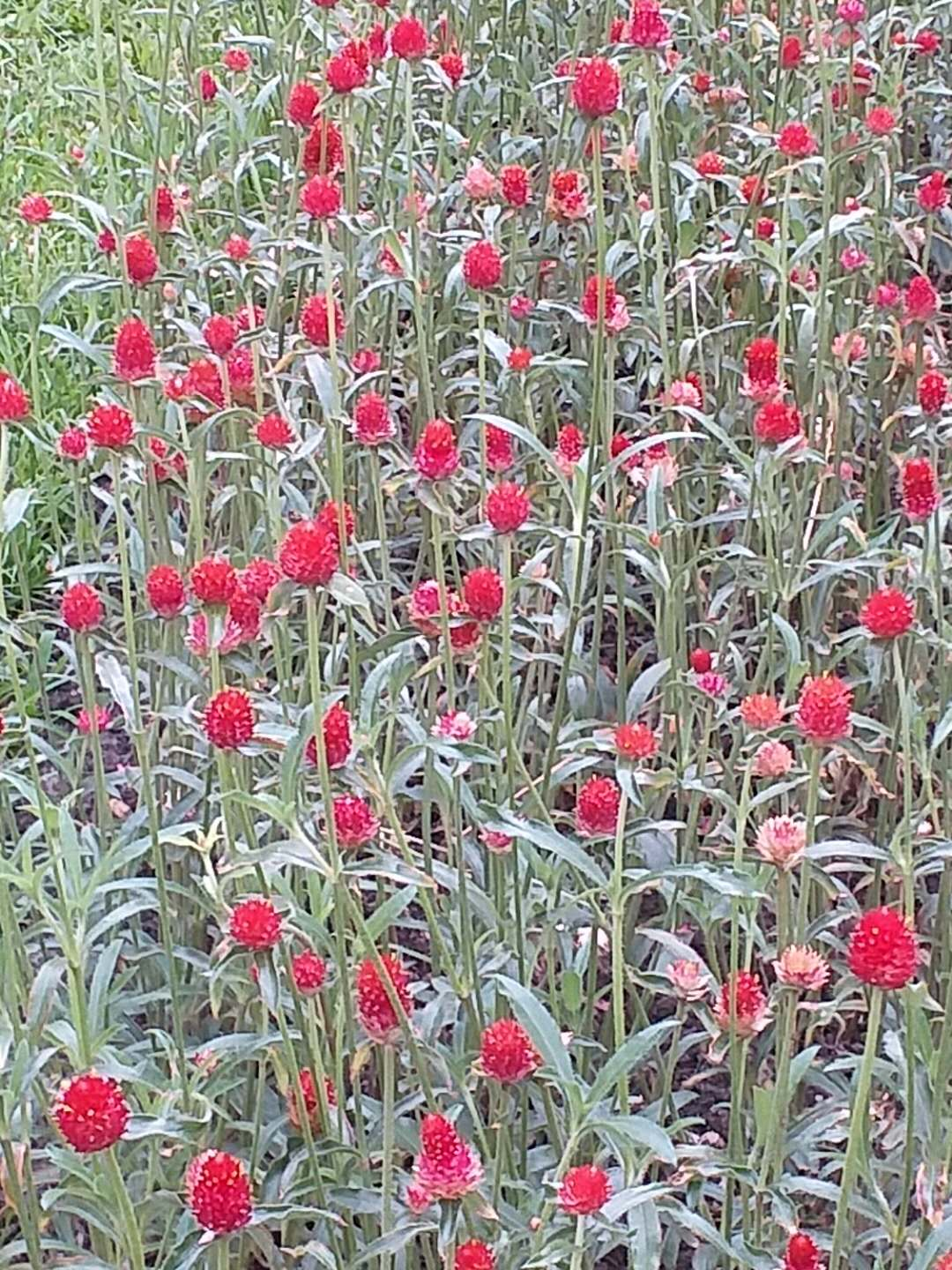
Gomphrena haageana Klotzsch, National Museum of Natural Science, Taichung, Taiwan.

Gomphrena is a genus of plants in the family Amaranthaceae. They are known as the globe amaranths.

The genus includes 139 species, which are native to the Americas (southern United States to southern Argentina), western and central tropical Africa, Australia, and Japan and Taiwan.

== Species ==
139 species are accepted.

- Gomphrena affinis F.Muell. ex Benth.
- Gomphrena agrestis Mart.
- Gomphrena anti-lethargica Silveira
- Gomphrena arborescens L.f.
- Gomphrena arida J.Palmer
- Gomphrena atrorubra J.Palmer
- Gomphrena axillaris R.W.Davis & J.Palmer
- Gomphrena basilanata Suess.
- Gomphrena bicolor Mart.
- Gomphrena boliviana Moq.
- Gomphrena brachystylis F.Muell.
- Gomphrena breviflora F.Muell.
- Gomphrena brittonii (Standl.) T.Ortuño & Borsch
- Gomphrena caespitosa Torr.
- Gomphrena canescens R.Br.
- Gomphrena cardenasii Standl. ex E.Holzh.
- Gomphrena celosioides Mart.
- Gomphrena centrota E.Holzh.
- Gomphrena chrestoides C.C.Towns.
- Gomphrena cladotrichoides Suess.
- Gomphrena claussenii Moq.
- Gomphrena colosacana Hunz. & Subils
- Gomphrena conferta Benth.
- Gomphrena conica (R.Br.) Spreng.
- Gomphrena connata J.Palmer
- Gomphrena cucullata J.Palmer
- Gomphrena cunninghamii (Moq.) Druce
- Gomphrena debilis Mart.
- Gomphrena decipiens Seub.
- Gomphrena demissa Mart.
- Gomphrena desertorum Mart.
- Gomphrena diffusa (R.Br.) Spreng.
- Gomphrena discolor R.E.Fr.
- Gomphrena duriuscula Moq.
- Gomphrena eichleri J.Palmer
- Gomphrena elegans Mart.
- Gomphrena equisetiformis R.E.Fr.
- Gomphrena eriophylla Mart.
- Gomphrena ferruginea Pedersen
- Gomphrena filaginoides M.Martens & Galeotti
- Gomphrena flaccida R.Br.
- Gomphrena floribunda J.Palmer
- Gomphrena fuscipellita T.Ortuño & Borsch
- Gomphrena gardneri Moq.
- Gomphrena globosa L. — Globe amaranth
- Gomphrena graminea Moq.
- Gomphrena guaranitica Chodat
- Gomphrena haageana Klotsch — Strawberry globe amaranth
- Gomphrena haenkeana Mart.
- Gomphrena hatschbachiana Pedersen
- Gomphrena hermogenesii J.C.Siqueira
- Gomphrena hillii Suess.
- Gomphrena humifusa J.Palmer
- Gomphrena humilis R.Br.
- Gomphrena incana Mart.
- Gomphrena involucrata Ewart
- Gomphrena kanisii J.Palmer
- Gomphrena lacinulata J.Palmer
- Gomphrena lanata R.Br.
- Gomphrena lanigera Pohl ex Moq.
- Gomphrena leontopodioides Domin
- Gomphrena leptoclada Benth.
- Gomphrena leptophylla (Benth.) J.Palmer
- Gomphrena leucocephala Mart.
- Gomphrena longistyla R.W.Davis, J.Palmer & T.Hammer
- Gomphrena macrocephala A.St.-Hil.
- Gomphrena macrorhiza Mart.
- Gomphrena magentitepala J.Palmer
- Gomphrena mandonii R.E.Fr.
- Gomphrena marginata Seub.
- Gomphrena martiana Gillies ex Moq.
- Gomphrena matogrossensis Suess.
- Gomphrena mendocina (Phil.) R.E.Fr.
- Gomphrena meyeniana Walp.
- Gomphrena microcephala Moq.
- Gomphrena mizqueensis T.Ortuño & Borsch
- Gomphrena mollis Mart.
- Gomphrena moquinii Seub.
- Gomphrena muscoides (Sw.) T.Ortuño & Borsch
- Gomphrena nealleyi J.M.Coult. & Fisher
- Gomphrena nigricans Mart.
- Gomphrena nitida Rothr.
- Gomphrena occulta J.Palmer
- Gomphrena oroyana Standl.
- Gomphrena pallida (Stuchlík) Pedersen
- Gomphrena paraguayensis Chodat
- Gomphrena paranensis R.E.Fr.
- Gomphrena parviceps Standl.
- Gomphrena parviflora Benth.
- Gomphrena perennis L.
- Gomphrena phaeotricha Pedersen
- Gomphrena pilosa (M.Martens & Galeotti) Moq.
- Gomphrena platycephala R.E.Fr.
- Gomphrena pohlii Moq.
- Gomphrena portulacoides (A.St.-Hil.) T.Ortuño & Borsch
- Gomphrena potosiana Suess. & Benl
- Gomphrena pringlei J.M.Coult. & Fisher
- Gomphrena prostrata Mart.
- Gomphrena pulchella Mart. – Pink Globe Amaranth
- Gomphrena pulvinata Suess.
- Gomphrena pumila Gillies ex Moq.
- Gomphrena pungens Seub.
- Gomphrena pusilla Benth.
- Gomphrena radiata Pedersen
- Gomphrena radicata (Hook.f.) T.Ortuño & Borsch
- Gomphrena regeliana Seub.
- Gomphrena riedelii Seub.
- †Gomphrena rigida (B.L.Rob. & Greenm.) T.Ortuño & Borsch
- Gomphrena riparia Pedersen
- Gomphrena rosula J.Palmer
- Gomphrena rudis Moq.
- Gomphrena rupestris Nees
- Gomphrena scandens (R.E.Fr.) J.C.Siqueira
- Gomphrena scapigera Mart.
- Gomphrena schinziana Stuchlík
- Gomphrena schlechtendaliana Mart.
- Gomphrena sellowiana Mart.
- Gomphrena serrata L.
- Gomphrena serturneroides Suess.
- Gomphrena sonorae Torr.
- Gomphrena sordida Farmar
- Gomphrena spissa Pedersen
- Gomphrena splendida R.L.Barrett & J.Palmer
- Gomphrena stellata T.Ortuño & Borsch
- Gomphrena subscaposa (Hook.f.) T.Ortuño & Borsch
- Gomphrena tenella (Moq.) Benth.
- Gomphrena tomentosa (Griseb.) R.E.Fr.
- Gomphrena triceps Pedersen
- Gomphrena trinervosa C.C.Towns.
- Gomphrena trollii Suess.
- Gomphrena umbellata J.Rémy
- Gomphrena uruguayensis Suess.
- Gomphrena vaga Mart.
- Gomphrena verecunda R.W.Davis
- Gomphrena vermicularis L.
- Gomphrena virgata Mart.
- Gomphrena viridis Wooton & Standl.
- Gomphrena vitellina Pedersen
- Gomphrena wrightii (Hook.f. ex Maxim.) T.Ortuño & Borsch

== Gallery ==
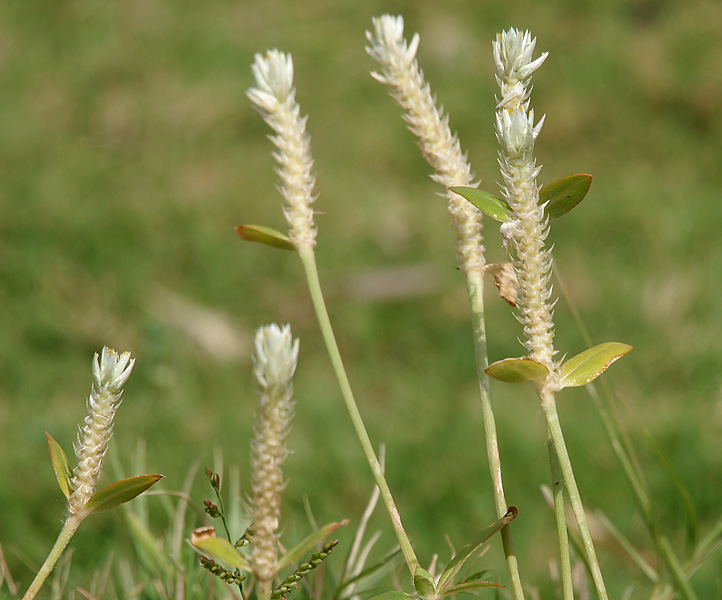
Gomphrena serrata in Hyderabad, India.

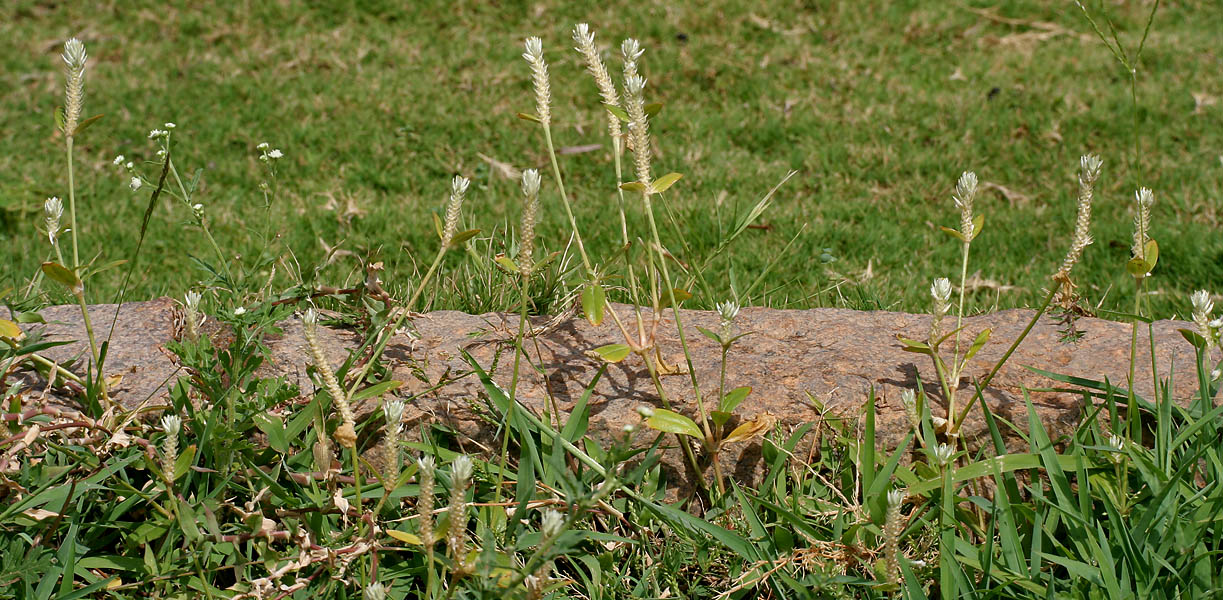
Gomphrena serrata in Hyderabad, India.

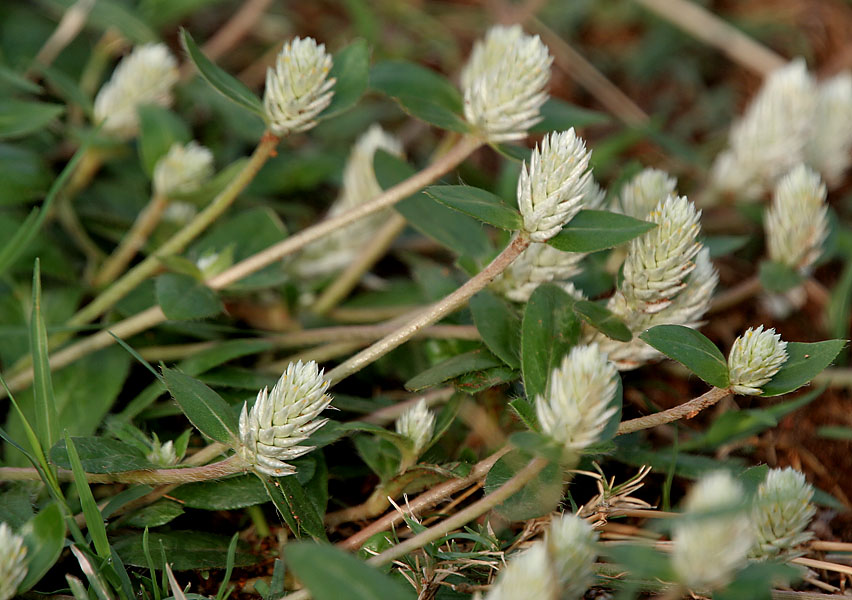
Gomphrena serrata in Hyderabad, India.

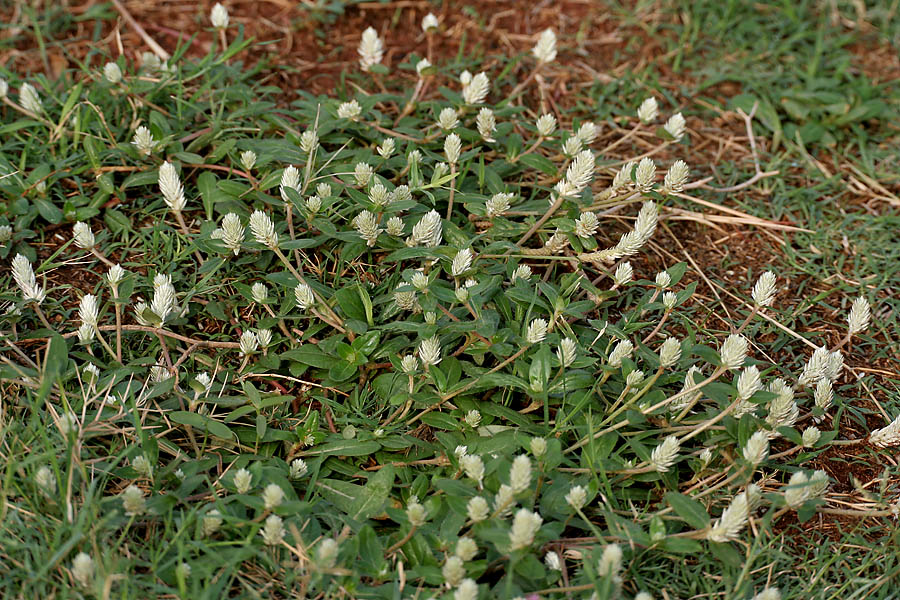
Gomphrena serrata in Hyderabad, India.

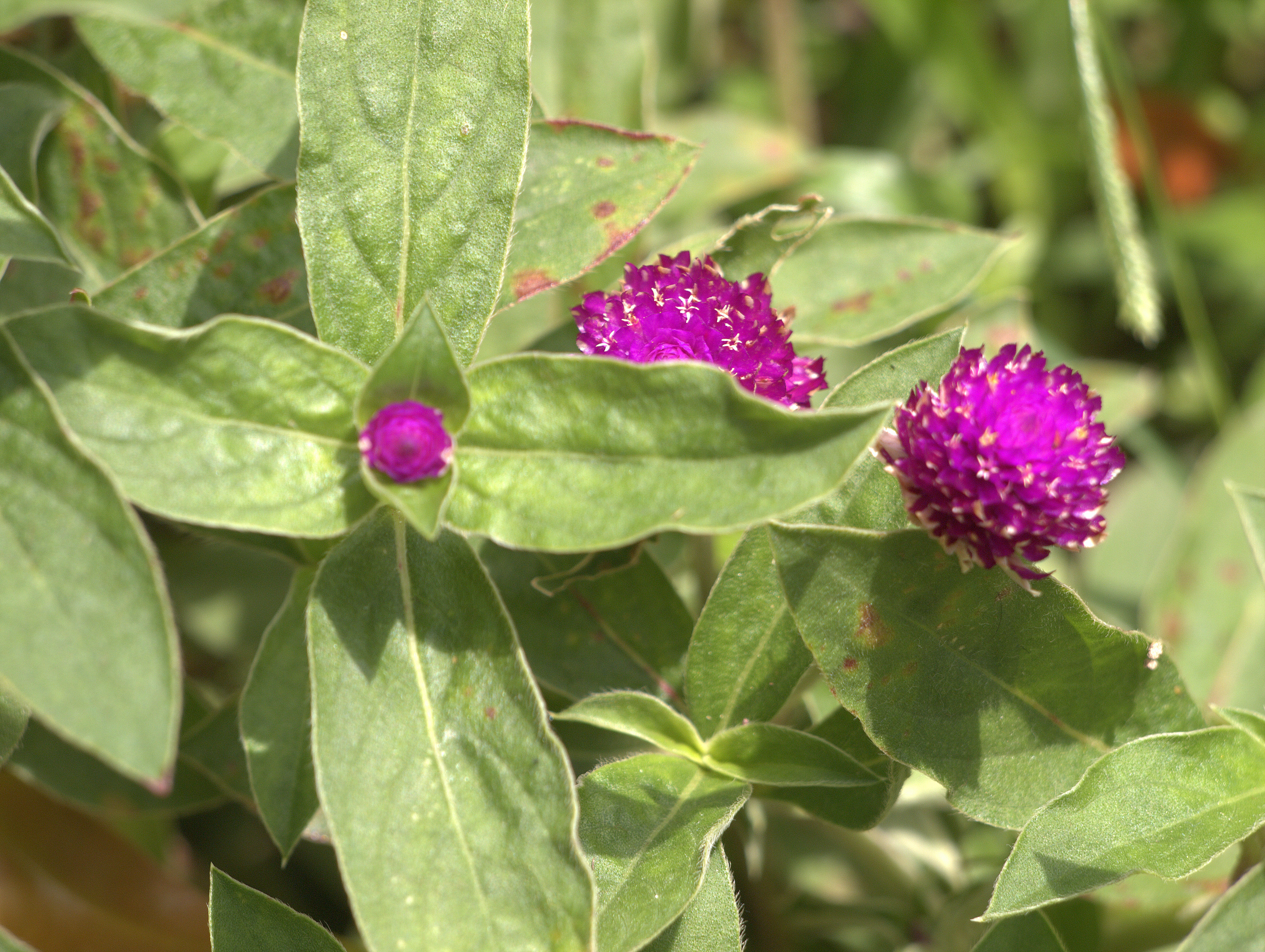
Gomphrena grown in Malaysia

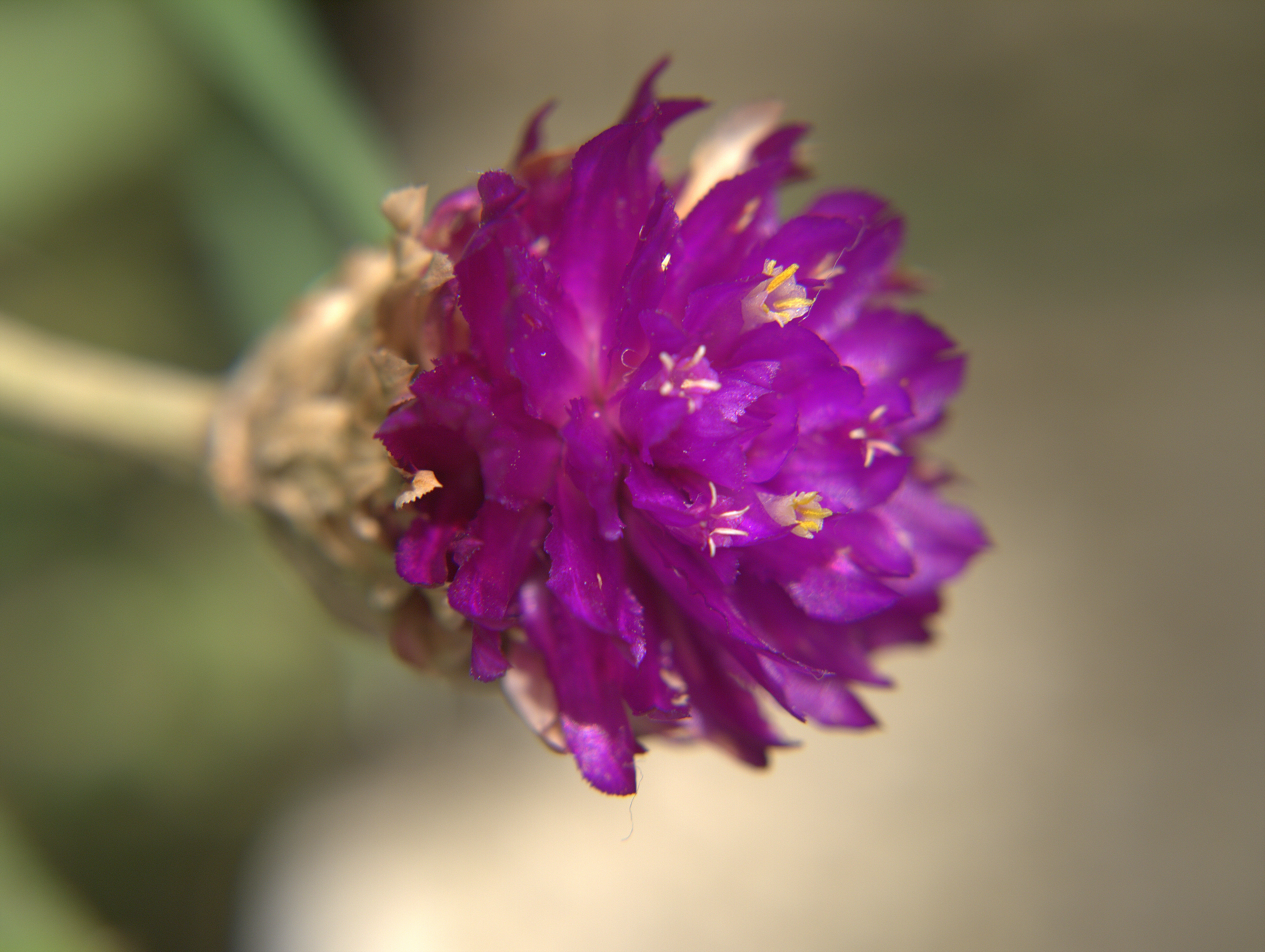
Closeup view of Gomphrena flower in Malaysia

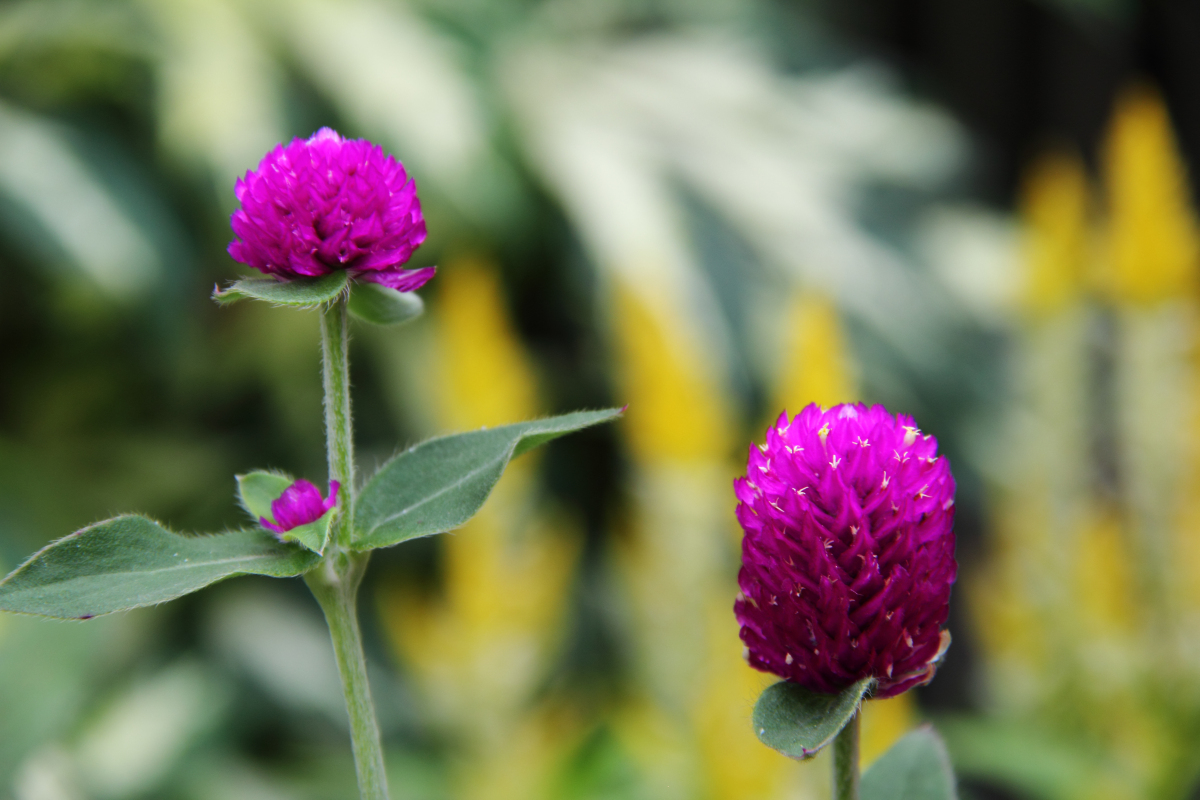
Gomphrena globosa

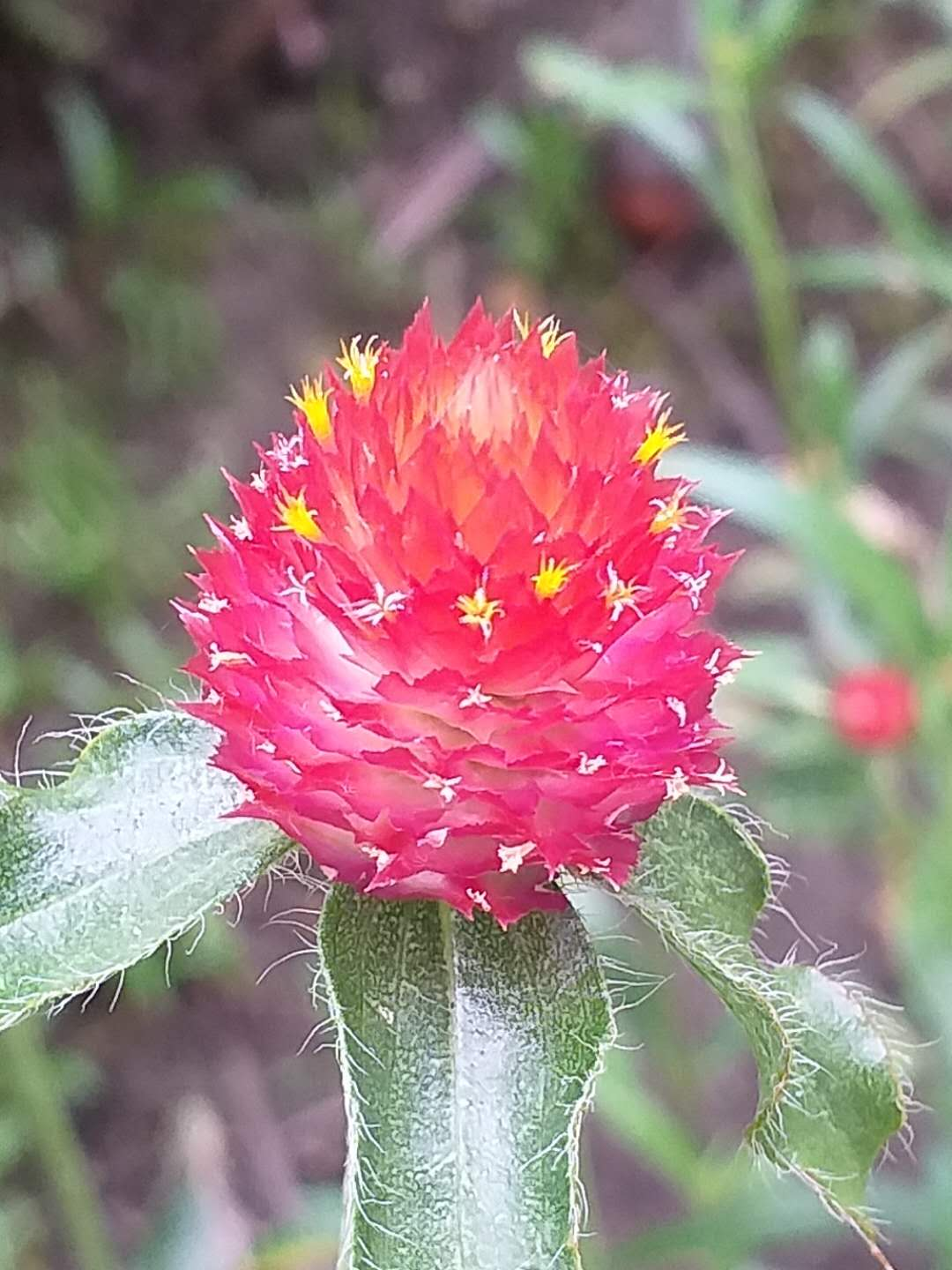
Gomphrena haageana Klotzsch, National Museum of Natural Science, Taichung, Taiwan.
