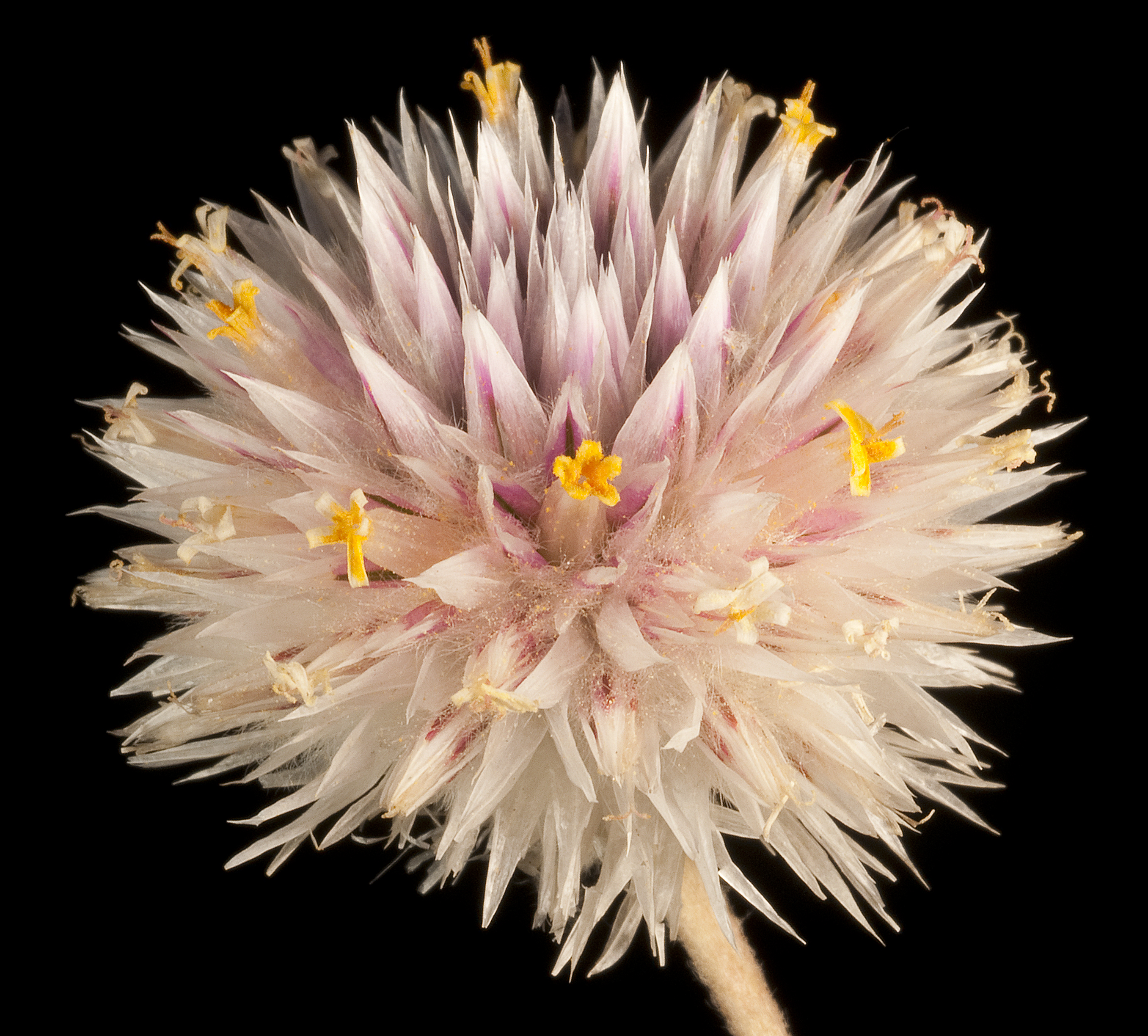

Scientific classification
- Kingdom: Plantae
- Clade: Tracheophytes
- Clade: Angiosperms
- Clade: Eudicots
- Order: Caryophyllales
- Family: Amaranthaceae
- Genus: Gomphrena
- Species: G. canescens

Binomial name
- Gomphrena canescens R.Br.

= Gomphrena canescens =

Species of plant from Australia

Gomphrena canescens (bachelors buttons) is an erect herbaceous annual or perennial plant that is found in many parts of northern Australia. Growing from 0.1 to 0.9 m tall, it grows in a variety of sites, including soils based on clay, sand or skeletal soils. Seen in woodlands, rocky slopes, coastal dunes and disturbed areas. Attractive pink flowers form from February to September.
