= Gomphrena subscaposa =

Conservation status
- Vulnerable (IUCN 2.3)

Scientific classification
- Kingdom: Plantae
- Clade: Tracheophytes
- Clade: Angiosperms
- Clade: Eudicots
- Order: Caryophyllales
- Family: Amaranthaceae
- Genus: Gomphrena
- Species: G. subscaposa

Binomial name
- Gomphrena subscaposa (Hook.f.) T.Ortuño & Borsch

Synonyms
- Alternanthera subscaposa Hook.f. (1847) (basionym); Iresine subscaposa Kuntze (1891); Lithophila subscaposa (Hook.f.) Standl. (1915)

Species of flowering plant

Gomphrena subscaposa, synonyms Alternanthera subscaposa and Lithophila subscaposa, is a species of flowering plant in the family Amaranthaceae. It is endemic to the Galápagos Islands.
