= Quaternella =

Scientific classification
- Kingdom: Plantae
- Clade: Tracheophytes
- Clade: Angiosperms
- Clade: Eudicots
- Order: Caryophyllales
- Family: Amaranthaceae
- Subfamily: Gomphrenoideae
- Genus: Quaternella; Pedersen

Species
- See text

Genus of plants in the amaranth family

Quaternella is a genus of flowering plants in the amaranth family Amaranthaceae, endemic to Brazil. They are shrubs or subshrubs found mostly in the cerrado biome.

== Species ==
Currently accepted species include:

- Quaternella confusa Pedersen
- Quaternella ephedroides Pedersen
- Quaternella glabratoides (Suess.) Pedersen
