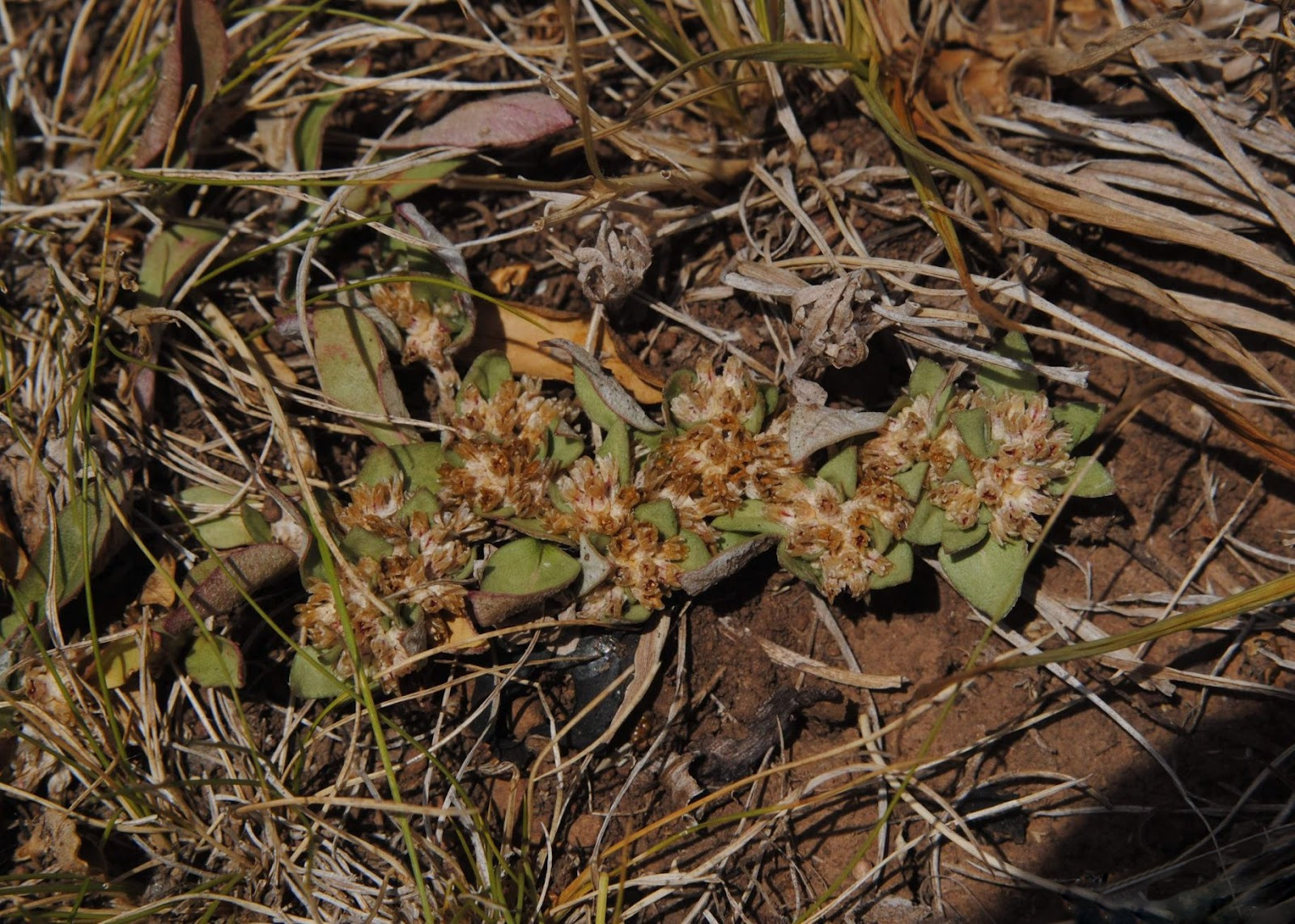
- Guilleminea elongata

Scientific classification
- Kingdom: Plantae
- Clade: Tracheophytes
- Clade: Angiosperms
- Clade: Eudicots
- Order: Caryophyllales
- Family: Amaranthaceae
- Subfamily: Gomphrenoideae
- Genus: Guilleminea; Kunth (1823)

Species
- seven; see text

Synonyms
- Brayulinea Small (1903), nom. superfl.; Gossypianthus Hook. (1840)

= Guilleminea =

Genus of flowering plants

Guilleminea is a small genus of plants in the family Amaranthaceae. They are sometimes known as matweeds. These are prostrate, mat-forming perennial herbs growing from taproots. The genus includes seven species native to the Americas, ranging from Arkansas, Colorado, and California to northern Argentina. The best known species is perhaps Guilleminea densa, the small matweed, which has been introduced to parts of Africa, Australia, and the eastern United States where it is a weed.

The genus was named after the French botanist Jean Baptiste Antoine Guillemin.

== Species ==
The genus contains seven species.

- Guilleminea chacoensis Pedersen – Paraguay and northeastern Argentina
- Guilleminea densa (Willd. ex Schult.) Moq. – Oklahoma, Colorado, and California to northern Argentina
- Guilleminea elongata Mears – Uruguay
- Guilleminea fragilis Pedersen – Brazil (Mato Grosso do Sul) and Paraguay
- Guilleminea gracilis R.E.Fr. – Colombia, Ecuador, Peru, Bolivia, and northwestern Argentina
- Guilleminea hirsuta Pedersen – Bolivia to northwestern Argentina (Salta Province)
- Guilleminea lanuginosa (Poir.) Benth. & Hook.f – Arkansas to New Mexico and northern Mexico, Hispaniola
