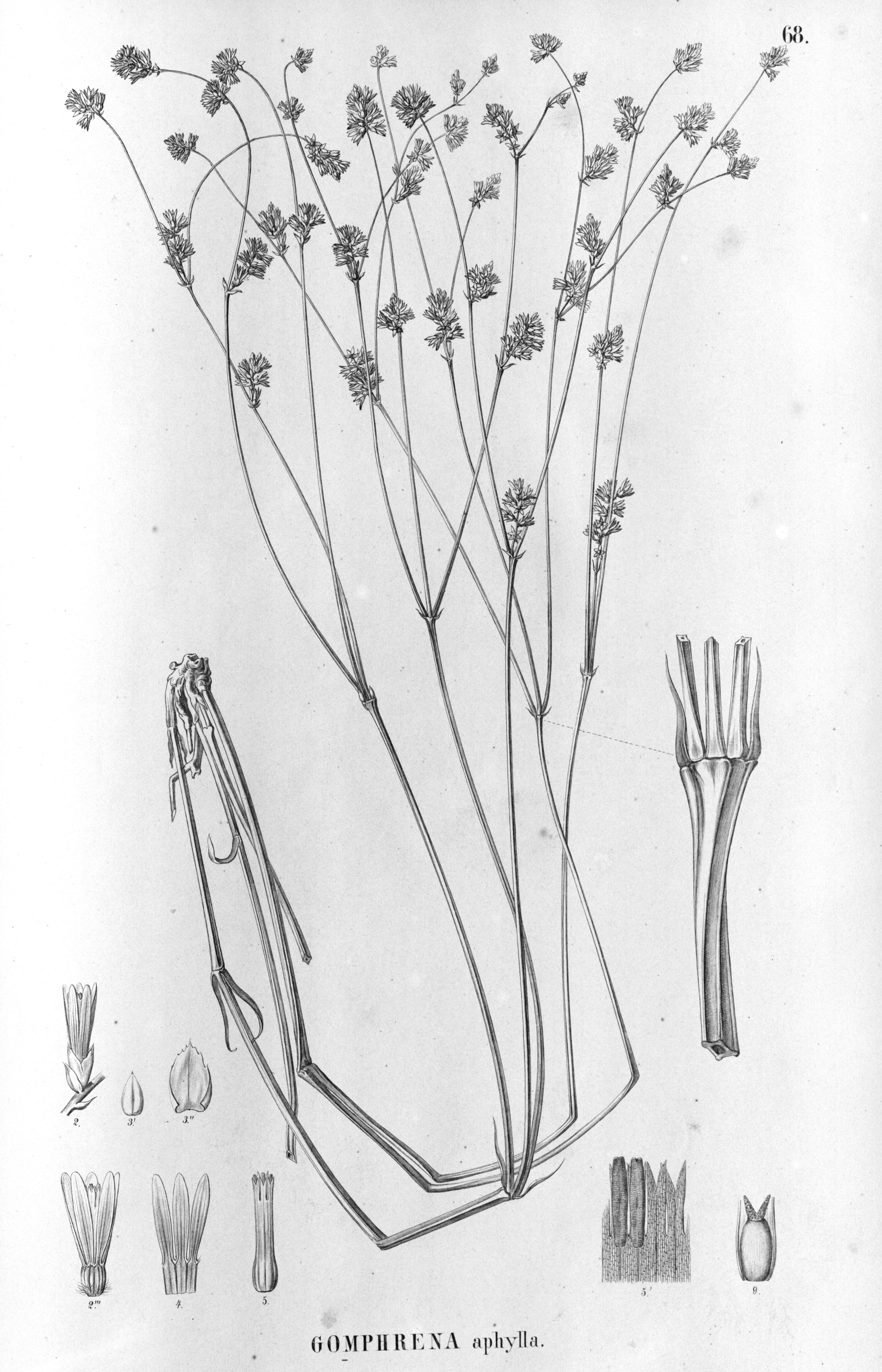

Scientific classification
- Kingdom: Plantae
- Clade: Tracheophytes
- Clade: Angiosperms
- Clade: Eudicots
- Order: Caryophyllales
- Family: Amaranthaceae
- Genus: Xerosiphon
- Species: X. aphyllus

Binomial name
- Xerosiphon aphyllus (Pohl ex Moq.) Pederse

Synonyms
- Gomphrena aphylla Pohl ex Moq.; Xeraea aphylla (Pohl ex Moq.) Kuntze

= Xerosiphon aphyllus =

Species of flowering plant

Xerosiphon aphyllus is a flowering plant in the amaranth family (Amaranthaceae). It is native to Brazil.
