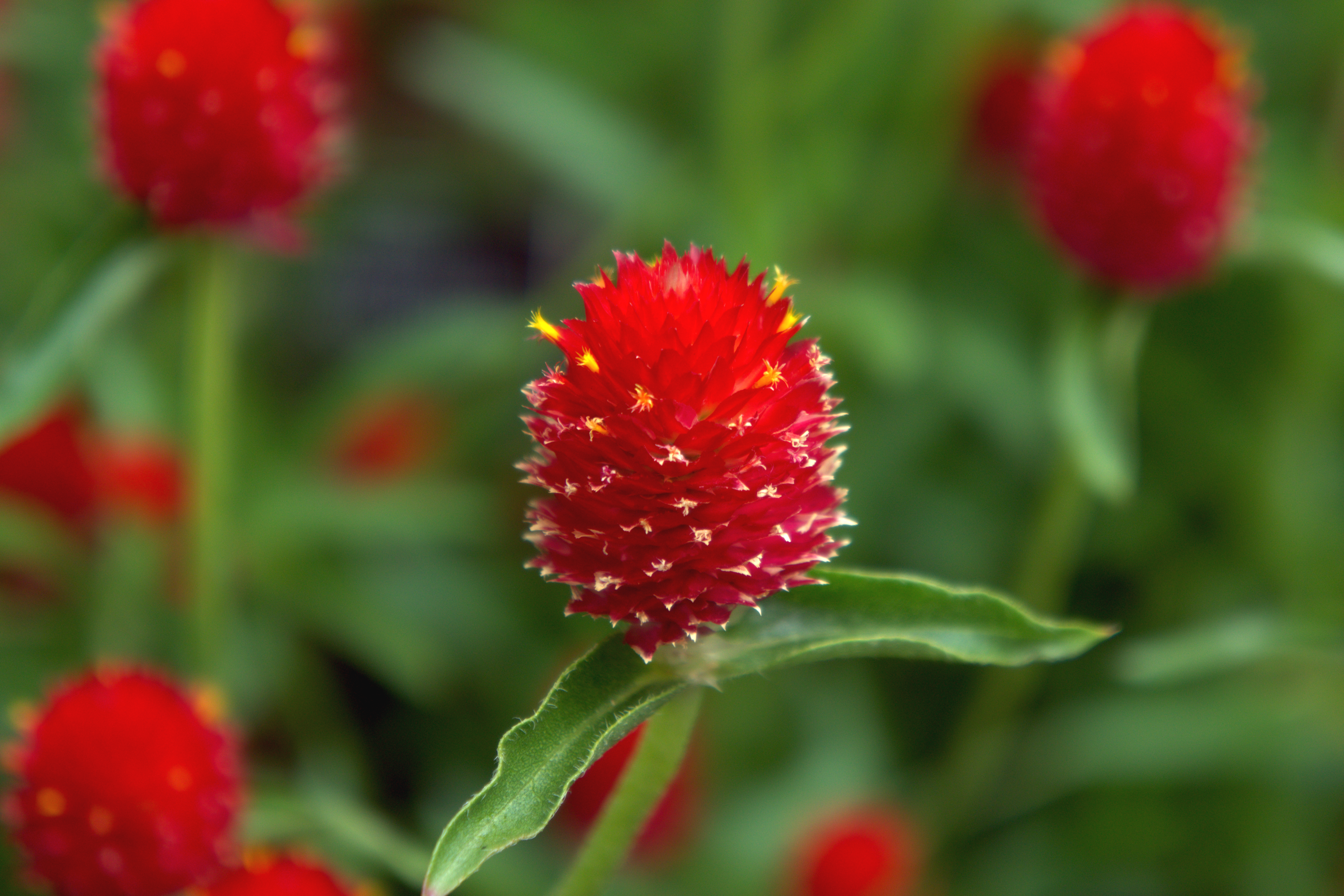
- Strawberry Fields globe amaranth

Scientific classification
- Kingdom: Plantae
- Clade: Tracheophytes
- Clade: Angiosperms
- Clade: Eudicots
- Order: Caryophyllales
- Family: Amaranthaceae
- Genus: Gomphrena
- Species: G. haageana

Binomial name
- Gomphrena haageana Klotzsch

= Gomphrena haageana =

Rio Grande globe amaranth

Species of flowering plant

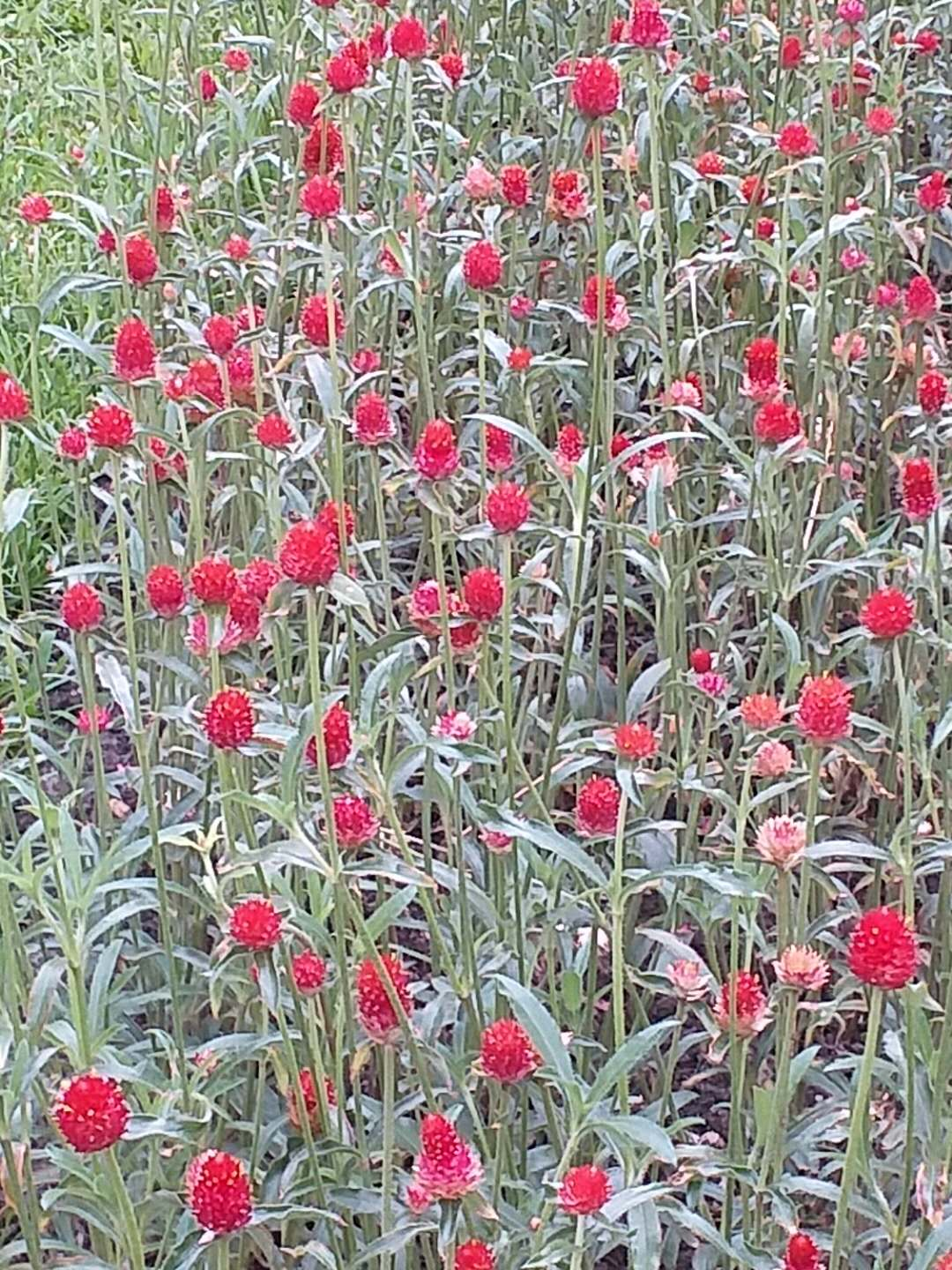
Gomphrena haageana Klotzsch, National Museum of Natural Science, Taichung, Taiwan.

Gomphrena haageana, the Rio Grande globe amaranth, is a herbaceous perennial plant that acts as an annual in temperate climates. The most common cultivar is known as Strawberry Fields globe amaranth. It has a red flower reminiscent of a strawberry. It can grow up to 45 cm (18 in) in height.

== Description ==
Gomphrena haageana is a perennial herb with a tuberous root, erect, about 20–70 cm (8–28 in), simple to much-branched; stem and branches subround, striped, moderately or thinly appressed-hairy. It has red strawberry-like flower heads. Leaves are narrowly inverted-lanceshaped to linear-oblong, 3 cm–8 cm × 0.3 cm–1 cm (1 1/8 in–3 1/8 in × 1/8 in–3/8 in), pointed to rather blunt with a small point at the tip, long-narrowed at the base, rather thinly appressed-hairy on both surfaces, the pair of leaves subtending the at branch-ends inflorescence stalkless, lanceshaped-ovate, long-tapering. Flower-heads are stalkless above the uppermost pair of leaves, spherical, 2–2.5 cm (3/4–1 in) in diameter, sometime finally shortly cylindrical and up to about 6 cm (2 1/2 in) long; bracts about 6 cm (2 1/2 in), narrowly deltoid-ovate, somewhat plicate, mucronate with the shortly excurrent midrib, bracteoles strongly compressed, boat-shaped, about 10–15 mm (3/8–9/16 in), mucronate, with an almost complete crest like that of Gomphrena globosa but generally even wider and more deeply toothed. It is native to Texas and Mexico.
