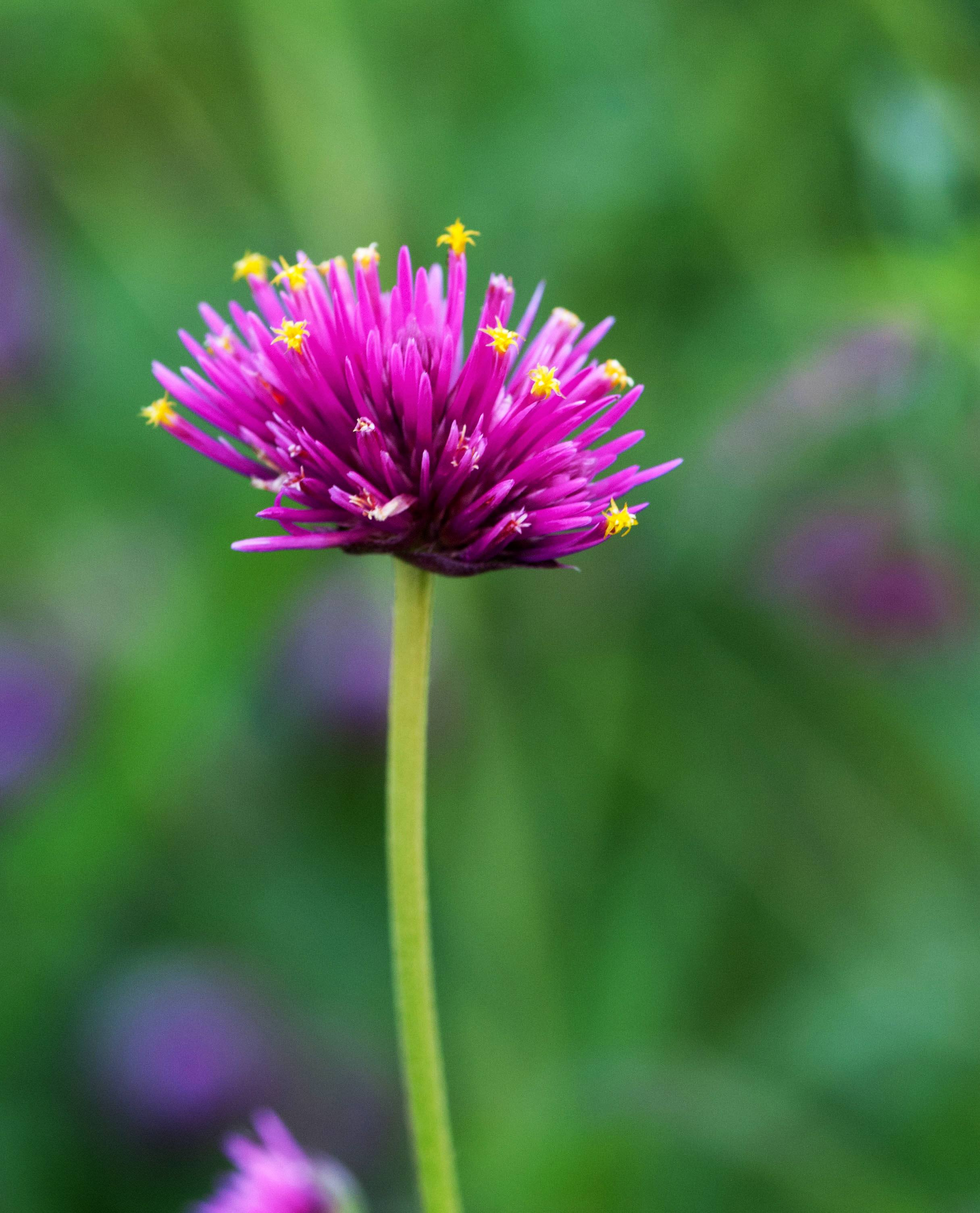

Scientific classification
- Kingdom: Plantae
- Clade: Tracheophytes
- Clade: Angiosperms
- Clade: Eudicots
- Order: Caryophyllales
- Family: Amaranthaceae
- Genus: Gomphrena
- Species: G. pulchella

Binomial name
- Gomphrena pulchella Mart.

Synonyms
- List: Xeraea pulchella (Mart.) Kuntze; Gomphrena bonariensis Gillies ex Moq.; Gomphrena perennis var. rosea (Griseb.) Stuchlík; Gomphrena pulchella subsp. albisericea (E.Holzh.) Pedersen; Gomphrena pulchella var. albisericea E.Holzh.; Gomphrena pulchella var. bonariensis Moq.; Gomphrena pulchella f. cylindrica Stuchlík; Gomphrena pulchella var. ecristata Chodat; Gomphrena pulchella f. linearifolia Stuchlík; Gomphrena pulchella f. major Hassl.; Gomphrena pulchella subf. parvifolia Stuchlík; Gomphrena pulchella subvar. pseudocristata Stuchlík; Gomphrena pulchella f. pulchella Suess.; Gomphrena pulchella f. ramosissima Stuchlík; Gomphrena pulchella subsp. rosea (Griseb.) Pedersen; Gomphrena pulchella f. simplex Stuchlík; Gomphrena rosea Griseb.

= Gomphrena pulchella =

Species of flowering plant

Gomphrena pulchella, the pink globe amaranth, is a species of flowering plant in the amaranth family native to Paraguay, Northern Argentina, and many of the surrounding areas, as well as parts of northeastern Brazil where it grows primarily in cerrado grasslands. It's also been introduced to southeastern Mexico and can be seen in gardens outside of that range.

== Description ==
Gomphrena pulchella has long, straight stems of about 30–50 cm (12–20 in) tall with a woody base and short hairs on most of it. The leaves are lance-like, and occur directly across from each other on the stem. The inflorescences are purplish pink and are in dense round clusters at the top of the stem. The true flowers are small and yellow, and mostly inconspicuous.

== Subspecies ==
G. pulchella has three subspecies:

- G. p. albisericea (E.Holzh.) Pedersen
- G. p. pulchella
- G. p. rosea (Griseb.) Pedersen

== Nomenclature ==
Gomphrena pulchella is known by a variety of common names. Often, it is generalized as a globe amaranth as a member of the genus Gomphrena, a name it shares with G. globosa. When referring to the specific species, it takes the common name of pink globe amaranth, or the Truffula pink globe amaranth, or simply Truffula pink, the latter two of which are specific to commercial applications; such as selling or advertising.

Occasionally, G. Pulchella may be known as a fireworks cultivar or fireworks Gomphrena.

== Gallery ==
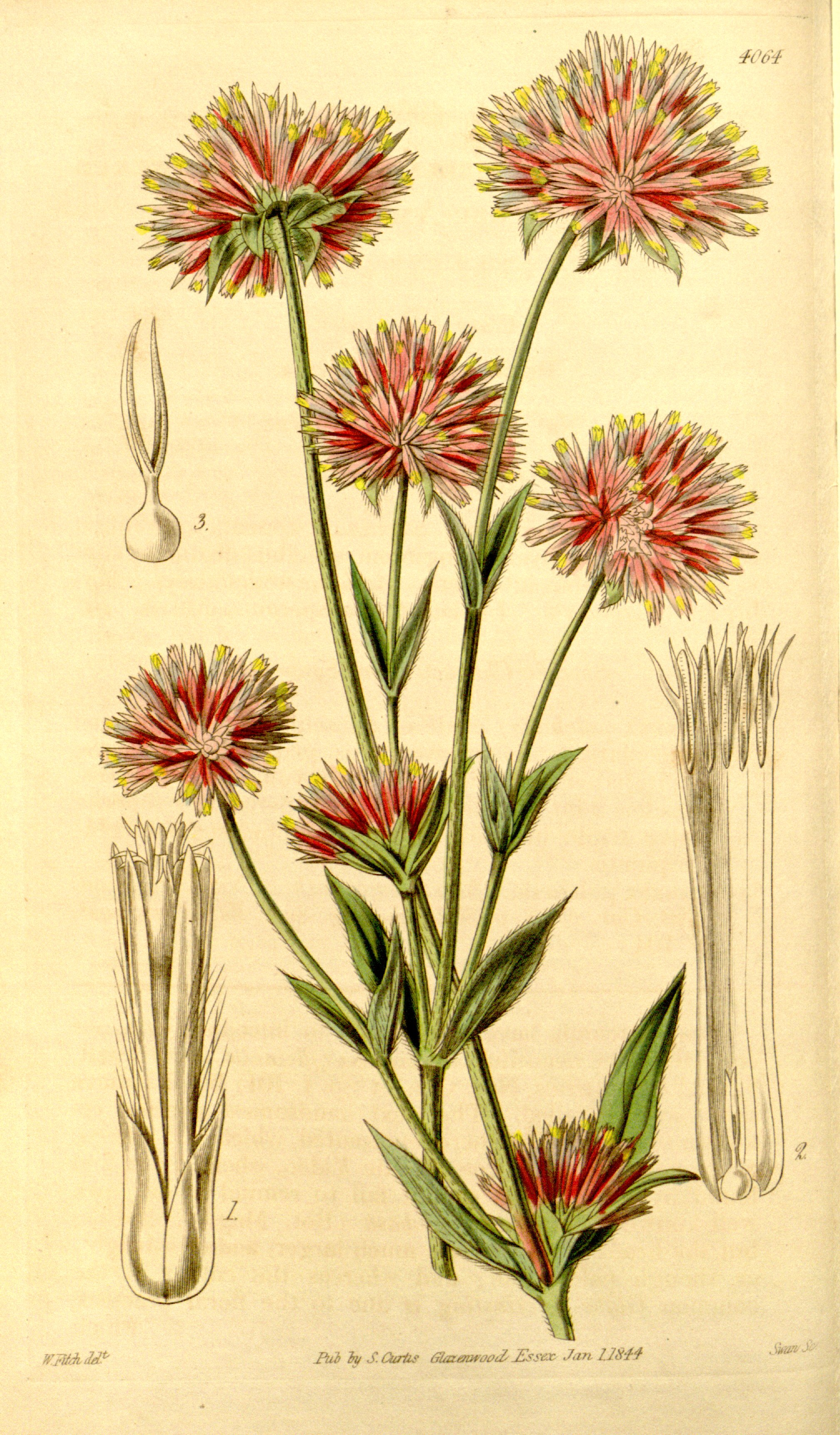
A drawing from a botanical magazine

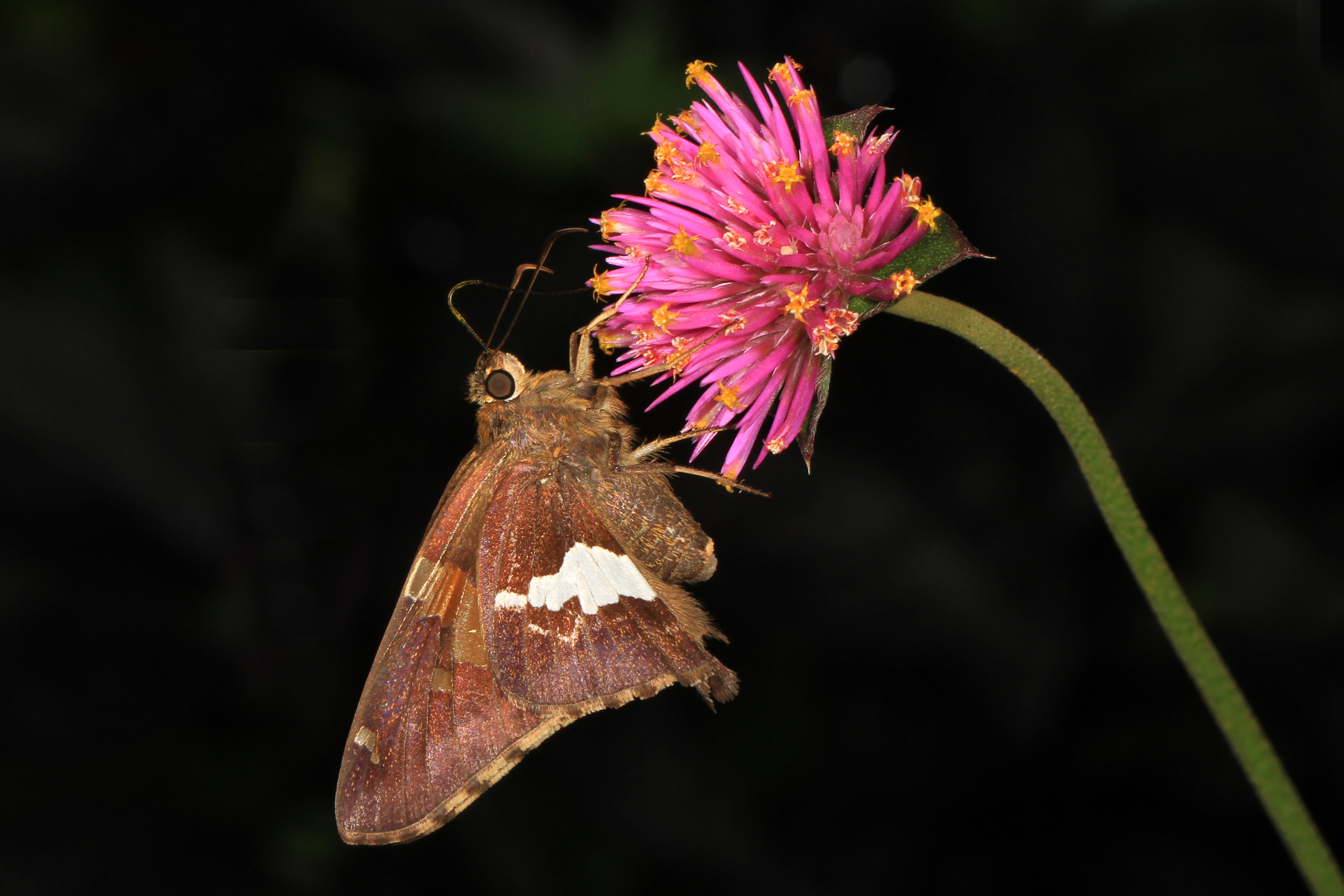
A silver spotted skipper on a flower

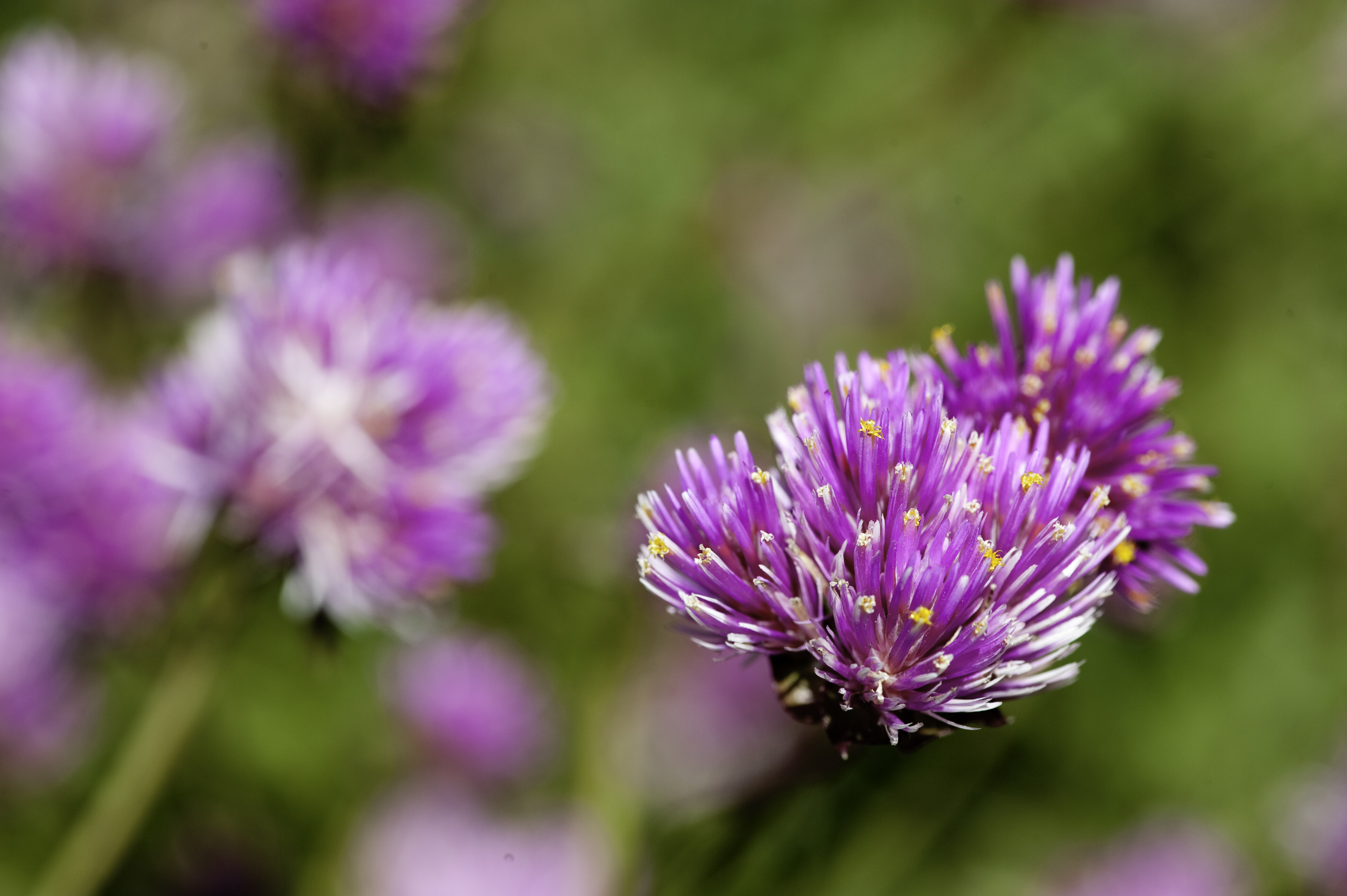
From Tower Hill

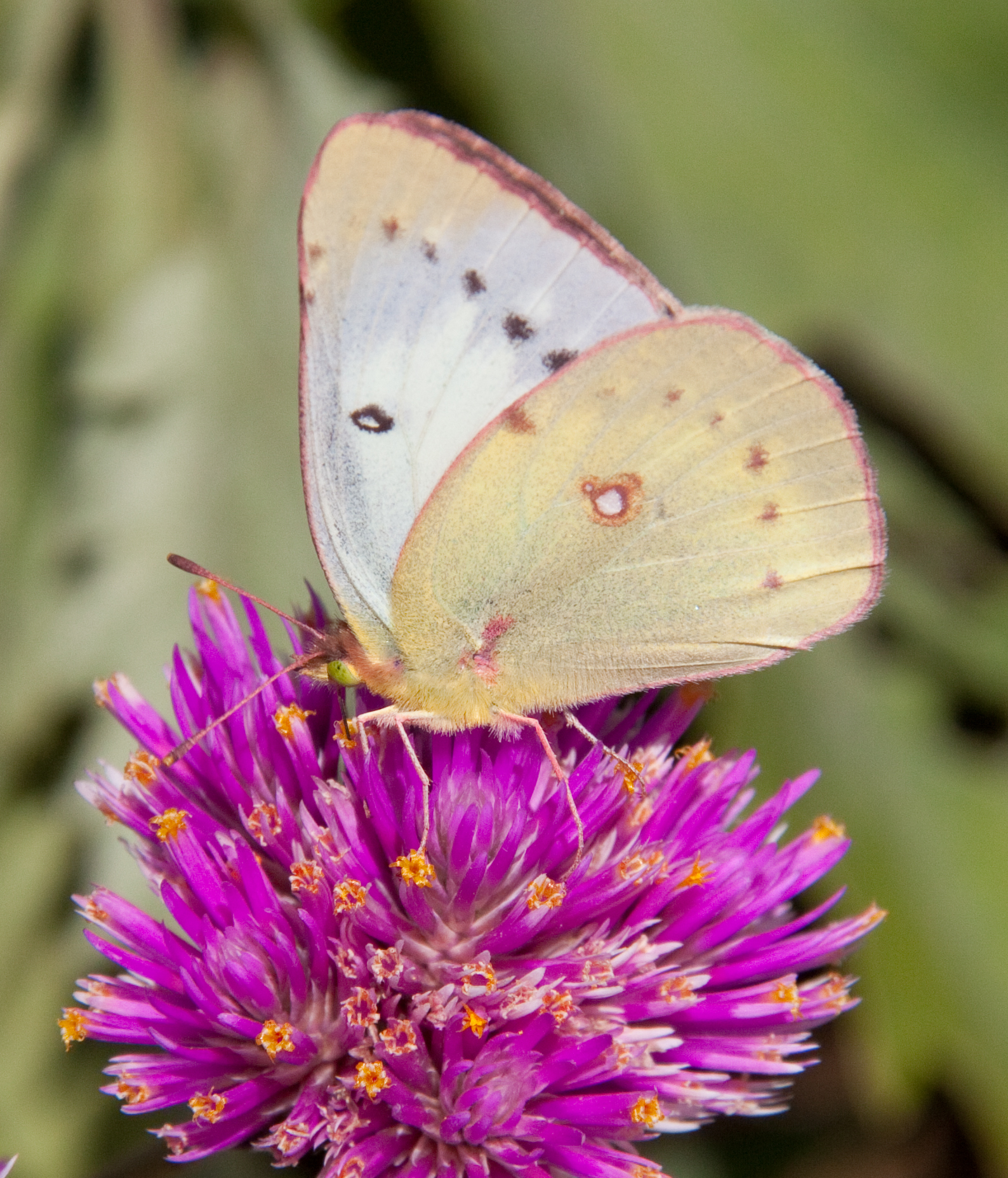
A pale clouded yellow butterfly on a flower

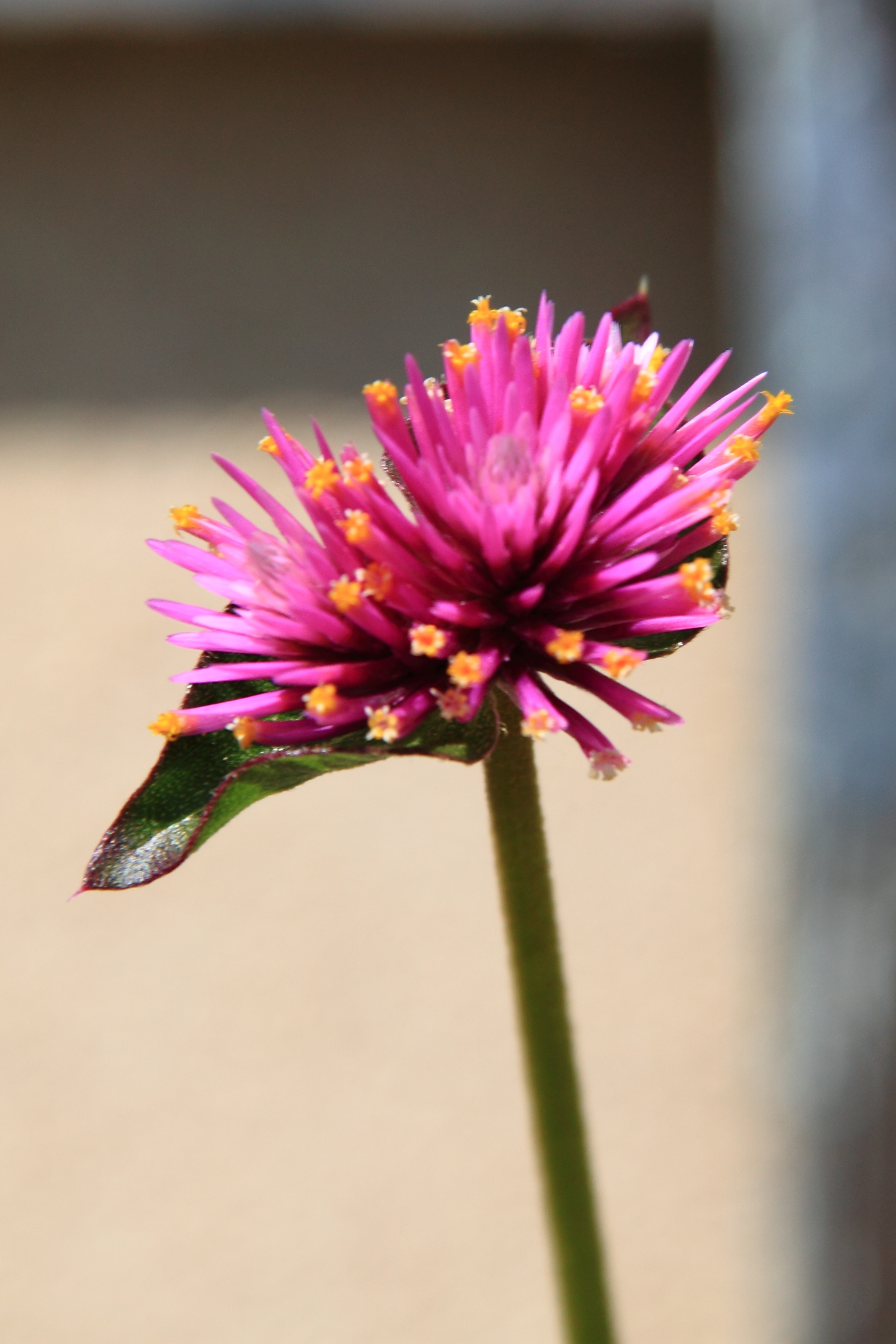
A flower
