= Jean Baptiste Antoine Guillemin =

French botanist (1796–1842)

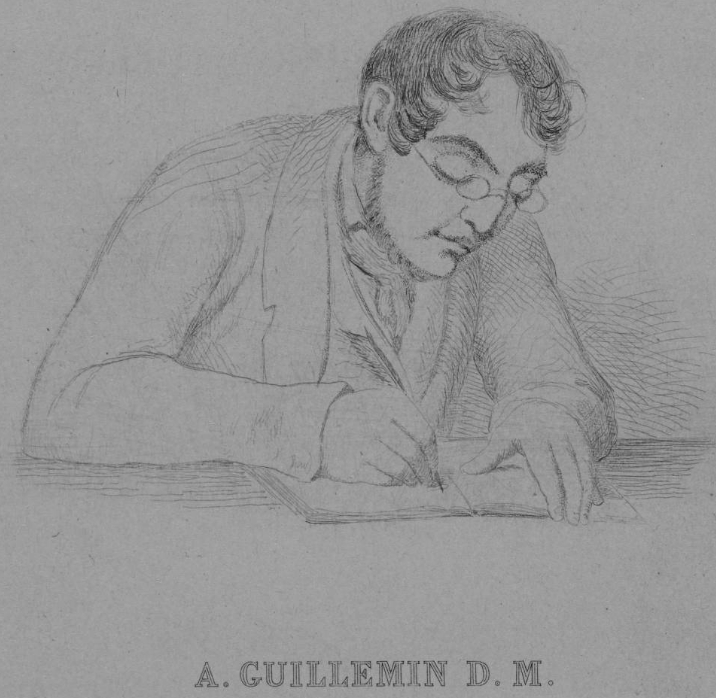

Jean Baptiste Antoine Guillemin (20 January 1796 in Pouilly-sur-Saône – 15 January 1842 in Montpellier) was a French botanist.

He studied at the municipal college in Seurre, where he was considered one of the most distinguished pupils. Upon leaving school he was placed with a lawyer. He worked there for eighteen months, but his interest in chemistry and desire to obtain a commission as a military pharmacist, at a time when it was difficult to avoid conscription, caused him to abandon the study of law. In 1812, he was apprenticed to a pharmacist in Dijon. After two years in that city, he went to Geneva, where he studied with Jean Pierre Étienne Vaucher (1763–1841) and Augustin Pyramus de Candolle (1778–1841). One day, while collecting plants in the Alps, he fell and broke his right arm. The injury was slow to heal, and the accident left him with permanent stiffness in the elbow joint. In 1820 he relocated to Paris, where he became curator of the herbarium and library of botanist Jules Paul Benjamin Delessert (1773–1784).

In 1827 he worked as an aide-préparateur at the Muséum national d'histoire naturelle. The carefree nature that pervaded his manners masked the prodigious memory that was his special gift. He was able to call to mind any work or plant he had ever seen, even many years later. In 1832 he received his PhD. Two years later he succeeded Adolphe Brongniart (1801–1876) as an assistant naturalist to the chair of botany. In 1838 he led a research mission to Brazil to study tea cultivation. While there, he collected plants with Ludwig Riedel (1790–1861) of the National Museum of Rio de Janeiro. Upon his return to France, he prepared and published a report on his expedition. He was awarded the Legion of Honor for his work.

With Achille Richard (1794–1852) and George Samuel Perrottet (1793–1870), he was co-author of a work on the flora of Senegambia (geographic location of present-day Senegal and Gambia) titled Florae Senegambiae Tentamen... (1830–1833). He was also the author of Zephyritis Taïtensis, considered to be the first enumeration of the plants of Tahiti. From 1834 until his death, he was editor of the Annales des Sciences Naturelles Botanique. A complete listing of Guillemin's written works is given in the French language version of Lasèque's 1842 tribute to Guillemin.

The genus Guilleminea was named in his honor by Carl Sigismund Kunth.
