= Gomphrena rigida =

Conservation status
- Extinct (IUCN 3.1)

Scientific classification
- Kingdom: Plantae
- Clade: Tracheophytes
- Clade: Angiosperms
- Clade: Eudicots
- Order: Caryophyllales
- Family: Amaranthaceae
- Genus: Gomphrena
- Species: †G. rigida

Binomial name
- †Gomphrena rigida (B.L.Rob. & Greenm.) T.Ortuño & Borsch (2020)

Synonyms
- Achyranthes rigida (B.L.Rob. & Greenm.) Standl. (1915); Alternanthera rigida B.L.Rob. & Greenm. (1895) (basionym); Blutaparon rigidum (B.L.Rob. & Greenm.) Mears (1982); Lithophila rigida (B.L.Rob. & Greenm.) Standl. (1915); Philoxerus rigidus (B.L.Rob. & Greenm.) Howell (1933)

Extinct species of flowering plant

Gomphrena rigida, sometimes known as the Galapagos amaranth, was a species of plant in the family Amaranthaceae. It was a shrub endemic to eastern Santiago Island the Galápagos Islands of Ecuador. It is now extinct. It was driven to extinction by over-grazing by introduced goats, and was last collected in 1908.
