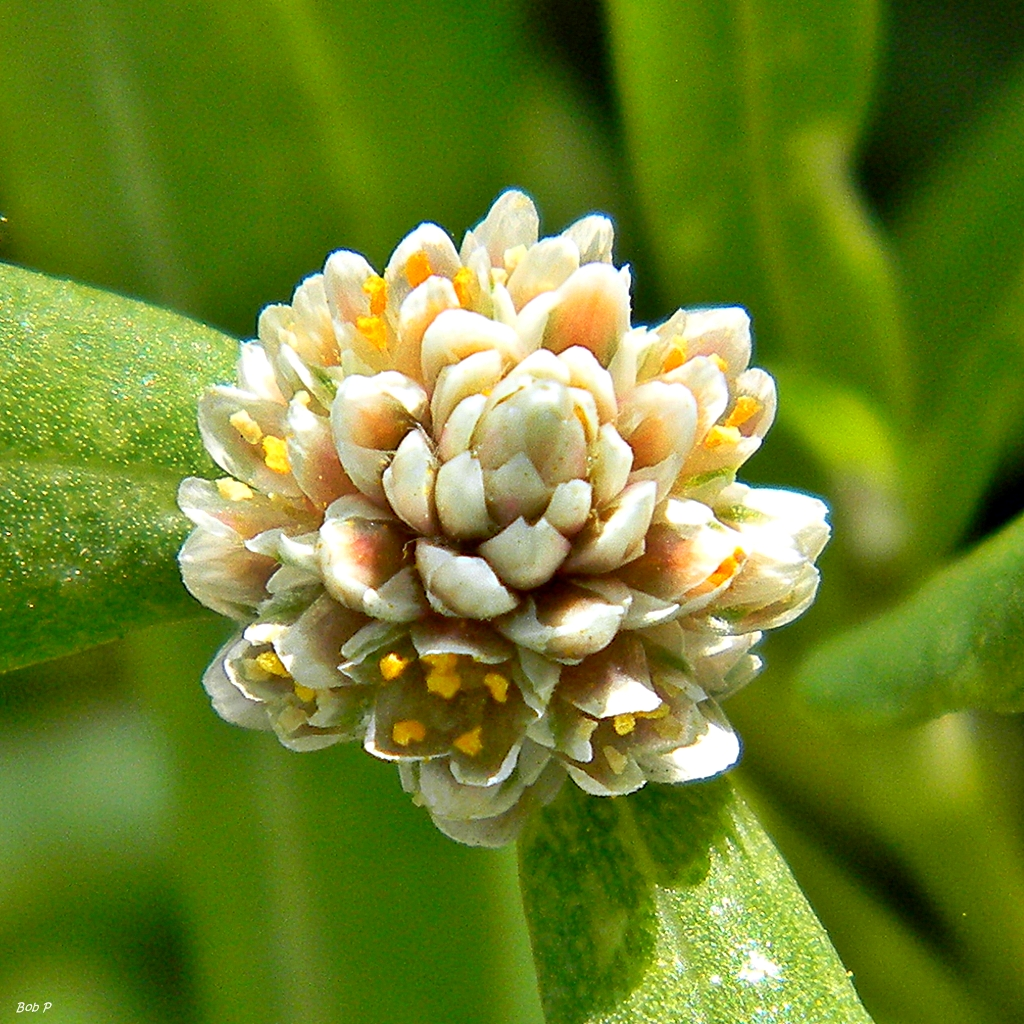

Scientific classification
- Kingdom: Plantae
- Clade: Tracheophytes
- Clade: Angiosperms
- Clade: Eudicots
- Order: Caryophyllales
- Family: Amaranthaceae
- Genus: Gomphrena
- Species: G. vermicularis

Binomial name
- Gomphrena vermicularis L. (1753)

Synonyms
- Synonymy: Achyranthes vermicularis (L.) Eaton (1829); Blutaparon brevifolium Raf. (1838), nom. illeg.; Blutaparon repens Raf. (1838), nom. illeg.; Blutaparon vermiculare (L.) Mears (1982); Blutaparon vermiculare var. aggregatum (Willd.) Mears (1982); Blutaparon vermiculare var. longispicatum (Moq.) Mears (1982); Caraxeron vermicularis (L.) Raf. (1837); Celosia maritima Salzm. ex Moq. (1849); Cruzeta crassifolia (Kunth) M.Gómez (1896); Cruzeta vermicularis (L.) M.Gómez (1896); Gomphrena aggregata Willd. (1809); Gomphrena albiflora Moq. (1849); Gomphrena crassifolia (Kunth) Spreng. (1824); Illecebrum vermiculatum (L.) L. (1762); Iresine aggregata (Willd.) Moq. (1849); Iresine crassifolia Moq. (1849); Iresine surinamensis Moq. (1849); Iresine vermicularis (L.) Moq. (1849); Iresine vermicularis var. aggregata (Willd.) Seub. (1875); Iresine vermicularis var. longispicata Moq. (1849); Iresine vermicularis var. microcephala Moq. (1849); Lithophila vermicularis (L.) Uline (1900); Philoxerus aggregatus (Willd.) Kunth (1818); Philoxerus crassifolius Kunth (1818); Philoxerus litoralis Suess. (1935); Philoxerus surinamensis Miq. ex Moq. (1849), not validly publ.; Philoxerus vermicularis (L.) Sm. (1814); Philoxerus vermicularis var. aggregatus (Willd.) Ridl. (1890); Philoxerus vermicularis var. microcephalus A.St.-Hil. (1833); Xeraea albiflora (Moq.) Kuntze (1891)

= Gomphrena vermicularis =

Species of flowering plant

Gomphrena vermicularis, with common names silverhead, silverweed, saltweed, and samphire, is a species of plant in the family Amaranthaceae, native to the Americas from the southeastern United States to Mexico, Central America, the Caribbean, northern South America, and Brazil, and to western and central tropical Africa from Mauritania to Angola. It has edible stems and leaves.
