= Galápagos Islands xeric scrub =

Terrestrial deserts and xeric shrublands on a islands

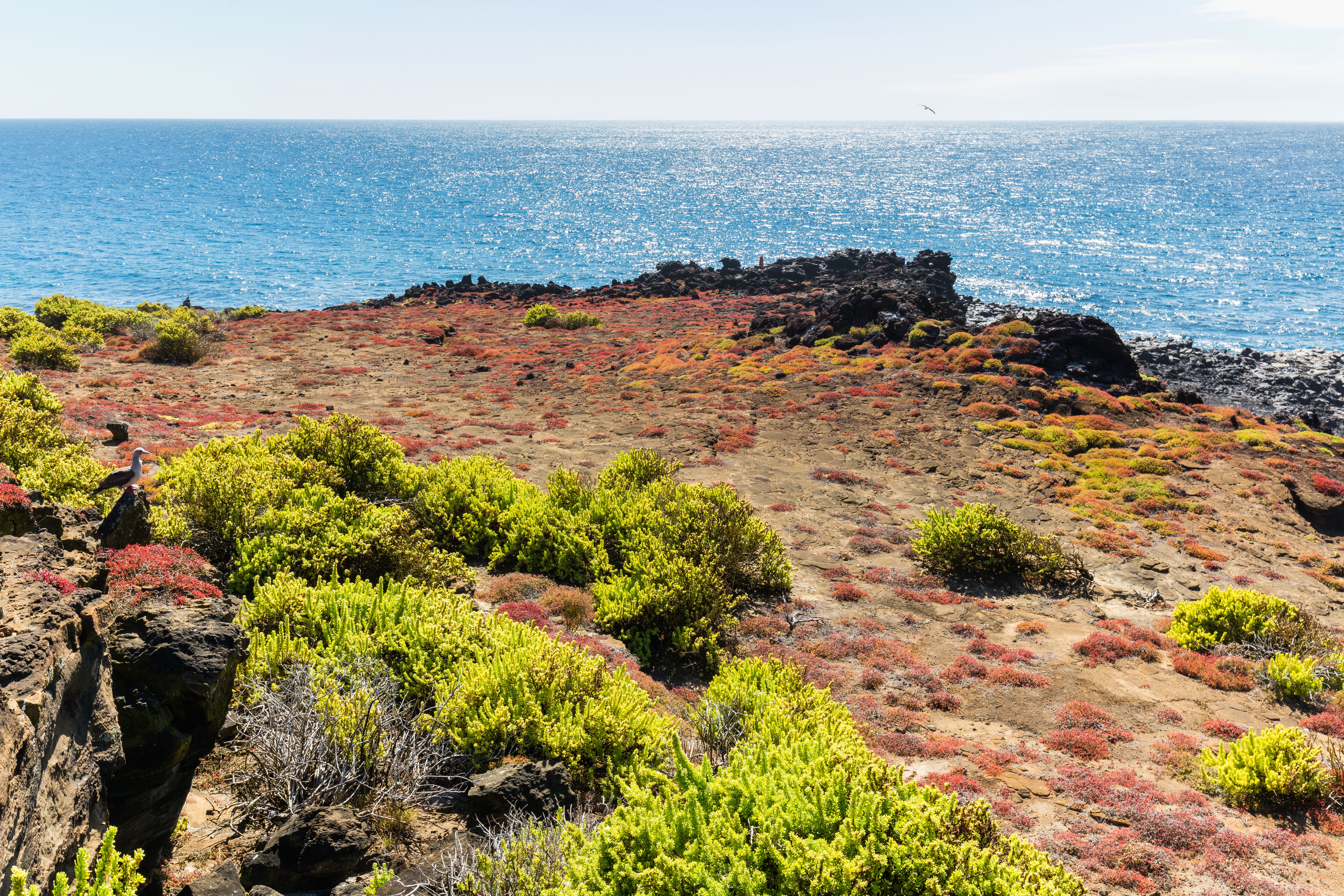
- Punta Pitt on San Cristóbal Island

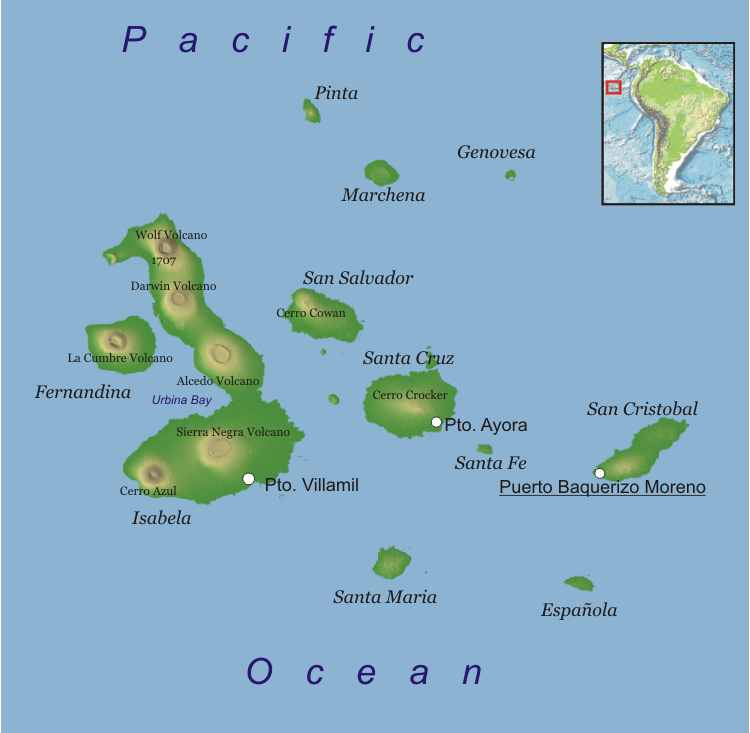
- Map of the Galápagos Islands

Ecology
- Realm: Neotropical
- Biome: deserts and xeric shrublands

Geography
- Area: 8,032 km^{2} (3,101 mi^{2})
- Country: Ecuador

Conservation
- Conservation status: Critical/endangered
- Global 200: yes
- Protected: 100%

The Galápagos Islands xeric scrub, also known as the Galápagos Islands scrubland mosaic, is a terrestrial deserts and xeric shrublands ecoregion that covers the Galápagos Islands. The Galápagos Islands are volcanic in origin, and remote from continents and other islands. The ecoregion is well known for its unique endemic species, including giant tortoises, birds, and marine iguanas, which evolved in isolation to adapt to islands' environments.

== Geography ==
The Galápagos Islands lie in the Pacific Ocean, about 960 km west of the South American mainland. They are politically part of Ecuador.

The Galápagos archipelago consists of 128 named islands. There are 13 islands larger than 10 km^{2}, 19 larger than 1 km^{2}, 42 islets smaller than 1 km^{2}, and at least 26 emergent rocks. The total land area of the archipelago is 8032 km^{2}. Isabela is the largest and highest island, with an area of 4,588 km^{2} and reaching an elevation of 1,707 meters.

The islands are volcanic in origin, formed by the Galápagos hotspot. The eastern islands are generally older, dating back 3 to 6 million years, while the western islands are less than 1 million years old. Surface geology consists of volcanic rock, typically basalt, and includes pumice, ash, and tuff ejected from volcanoes. The landscape has volcanic features like crater lakes, lava fields, lava tubes, fumaroles, and sulfur vents. Soils are generally young and thin.

Four islands – Isabela, Santa Cruz, San Cristóbal, and Floreana – are permanently inhabited. The islands have approximately 30,000 permanent residents. There are docks on all the inhabited islands, and an airport on San Cristóbal. Baltra Island has an airport, military base, tourism dock, and fuel facilities.

== Climate ==
The climate is tropical, oceanic, and semi-arid, influenced by the annual movements of ocean currents. There are two main seasons. The dry or garúa (misty) season generally lasts from May to December, influenced by the cool Humboldt Current coming from the south. The dry season is characterized by cooler temperatures and lower rainfall. Mist and drizzling rain, known as garúa, occurs during this season, particularly in the highlands. August is typically the coolest and driest month, with temperatures as low as 18°C and as little as 5 mm of rainfall.

The hot and wet season extends December to May, influenced by the warm Panama Current from the north shifting to surround the islands. This season brings warmer temperatures and higher rainfall. March is typically the warmest and wettest month, with temperatures as high as 30°C and as much as 80 mm of rainfall.

Temperature and rainfall vary with elevation, creating a range of microclimates on the higher islands. Average annual temperature declines an average of 0.9°C for every 100 meters of elevation, and rainfall increases. Average annual rainfall for the archipelago is 356 mm at sea level and 1,092 mm at 200 meters elevation.

== Flora ==
Most of the Galápagos is covered in semi-desert vegetation, including shrublands, grasslands, and dry forest. A few of the islands have high-elevation areas with cooler temperatures and higher rainfall, which are home to humid-climate forests and shrublands, and montane grasslands, or pampas, at the highest elevations. There are about 500 species of native vascular plants on the islands, including 90 species of ferns. About 180 vascular plant species are endemic.

Coastal plant communities are generally low-growing shrubs and herbs which are tolerant of drought and salt spray. Typical plants include the shrubs saltbush (Cryptocarpus pyriformis) and Maytenus octagona. Herbaceous seashore plants include the widespread beach morning glory (Ipomoea pes-caprae) and Sesuvium portulacastrum, and the endemic Galápagos carpet weed (Sesuvium edmonstonei).

Mangroves grow in calm inlets and lagoons. Typical species include red mangrove (Rhizophora mangle), black mangrove (Avicennia germinans), and white mangrove (Laguncularia racemosa) and button mangrove (Conocarpus erectus).

The arid zone lies inland of the coastal zone and extends to 200 meters elevation or higher. It covers most of the archipelago. It includes trees, shrubs, cacti, and herbs adapted to dry conditions. Common trees include the palo santo (Bursera graveolens) and paga paga (Pisonia floribunda), and the endemic trees guayabillo (Psidium galapageium) and Bursera malacophylla, which is found only on Seymour, Baltra and Daphne islands. Cacti include several endemic species of Opuntia – Opuntia echios, O. helleri, and others – and the endemic genera Jasminocereus and Brachycereus. Ground cover plants include low shrubs, like the endemic bitterbush (Castela galapageia) and species of the endemic genus Lecocarpus, and herbaceous plants. Herbaceous arid zone species include the endemic species in genera Tiquilia and Euphorbia section Anisophyllum (formerly Chamaesyce), Galápagos tomato (Solanum galapagense), and stinking passion flower (Passiflora foetida).

On islands that reach higher elevations, there is transition zone between the arid and humid zones between 200 and 300 meters elevation. Transition zone plants include Pisonis floribunda and Psidium galapageium at lower elevations, and P. galapageium with Scalesia trees closer to the humid zone.

The humid zone lies above 300 meters elevation. It has higher rainfall than lower-elevation areas, and the dry-season garua fogs reduce plants' loss of moisture through evaporation and provide some moisture from condensation. Woodlands of Scalesia trees, 5 to 15 meters tall, are predominant from 300 to 500 meters elevation, with over 20 species of the endemic genus across the high islands of the archipelago. The low tree cat's claw (Zanthoxylum fagara) is most abundant between 500 and 600 meters elevation, in the transition between the Scalesia woodlands below and the Miconia shrublands above. The shrub Miconia robinsoniana is predominant between 600 and 700 meters elevation, particularly on Santa Cruz and San Cristóbal islands, forming shrublands 3 to 4 meters high.

High-elevation grasslands, known as pampa, are found above 900 meters elevation. The pampa is lush with grasses, ferns, sphagnum moss, and orchids. 11 species of orchids are found here, including the endemic species Cranichis lichenophila, Cyclopogon werffii, Epidendrum spicatum, and Ponthieva insularis, along with Cranichis ciliata, Cranichis werffii, Govenia gardneri, Habenaria alata, Habenaria distans, Habenaria monorrhiza, Ionopsis utricularioides, Liparis nervosa, Prescottia oligantha, and Tropidia polystachya. The endemic tree fern Cyathea weatherbyana is a pampa native.

== Fauna ==
The Galápagos is home to many endemic species of reptiles, birds, mammals, land snails, insects.

There are 19 resident seabird species, including five endemic species. Endemic seabirds include the Galapagos penguin (Spheniscus mendiculus), waved albatross (Phoebastria irrorata), flightless cormorant (Nannopterum harrisi), swallow-tailed gull (Creagrus furcatus), and lava gull (Leucophaeus fuliginosus). The Waved albatross (Phoebastria irrorata) can be found on the coasts of mainland South America but breeds only on the Galapagos Islands and Isla de la Plata.

The islands are home to 29 native species of land birds, 24 of which are endemic. Endemic species include the Galapagos hawk (Buteo galapagoensis), Galapagos dove (Zenaida galapagoensis), Galapagos rail (Laterallus spilonota), Galápagos martin (Progne modesta), and four species of mockingbirds from genus Nesomimus. There are about 18 distinct species of endemic tanagers on the island, collectively known as Darwin's finches.

There are 22 endemic reptile species in the Galápagos. Notable species include the giant Galápagos tortoise (Chelonoidis niger ), which evolved 15 distinct subspecies, of which 13 remain. Other endemic reptiles include the marine iguana (Amblyrhynchus cristatus) and three species of snakes, the Galápagos racer (Pseudalsophis biserialis), Pseudalsophis dorsalis, and Pseudalsophis slevini.

There are nine known species of terrestrial mammals – four surviving and three extinct species of rice rats, and two species of bats.

The four surviving species of rice rat live on uninhabited islands – Nesoryzomys fernandinae and Nesoryzomys indefessus narboroughi on Fernandina, Nesoryzomys swarthi on Santiago, and Aegialomys galapagoensis on Santa Fé. The other species were driven to extinction by competition with introduced black rats (Rattus rattus).

The hoary bat (Lasiurus cinereus) is an insect-eating species that roosts on mangroves and shrubs. It is found on Santa Cruz, San Cristóbal, Isabela, Santiago, and Floreana. The Galápagos red bat (Lasiurus blossevillii brachyotis) inhabits Santa Cruz and San Cristóbal, where feeds near the ground on insects.

== Conservation and threats ==
Most of the islands' land and marine area is permanently protected. Invasive species are considered the greatest current threat to the Galápagos' native animals and plants. Non-native species compete with native ones for habitat, and some prey on natives unadapted to predation. Non-native species have been introduced since the islands were first visited by humans, and the islands' growing human population and increasing movement of goods and people to the islands are introducing new non-native species at a high rate.

== Protected areas ==
97% of the islands' land area is in Galápagos National Park, which was created in 1959. Human settlements are limited to the remaining 3% of the islands, located on the four permanently inhabited islands. Access to the uninhabited islands is strictly controlled, and visitor numbers and itineraries are limited and planned by authorities. Approximately 170,000 people visit the islands each year.

In 1986, the Galápagos Marine Reserve was created, with an area of 70,000 km^{2}. In 1998, the marine reserve was enlarged to 133,000 km^{2}.
