= Tropidia =

Tropidia is the scientific name of two genera of organisms and may refer to:

- Tropidia (fly), a genus of insects in the family Syrphidae
- Tropidia (plant), a genus of plants in the family Orchidaceae
