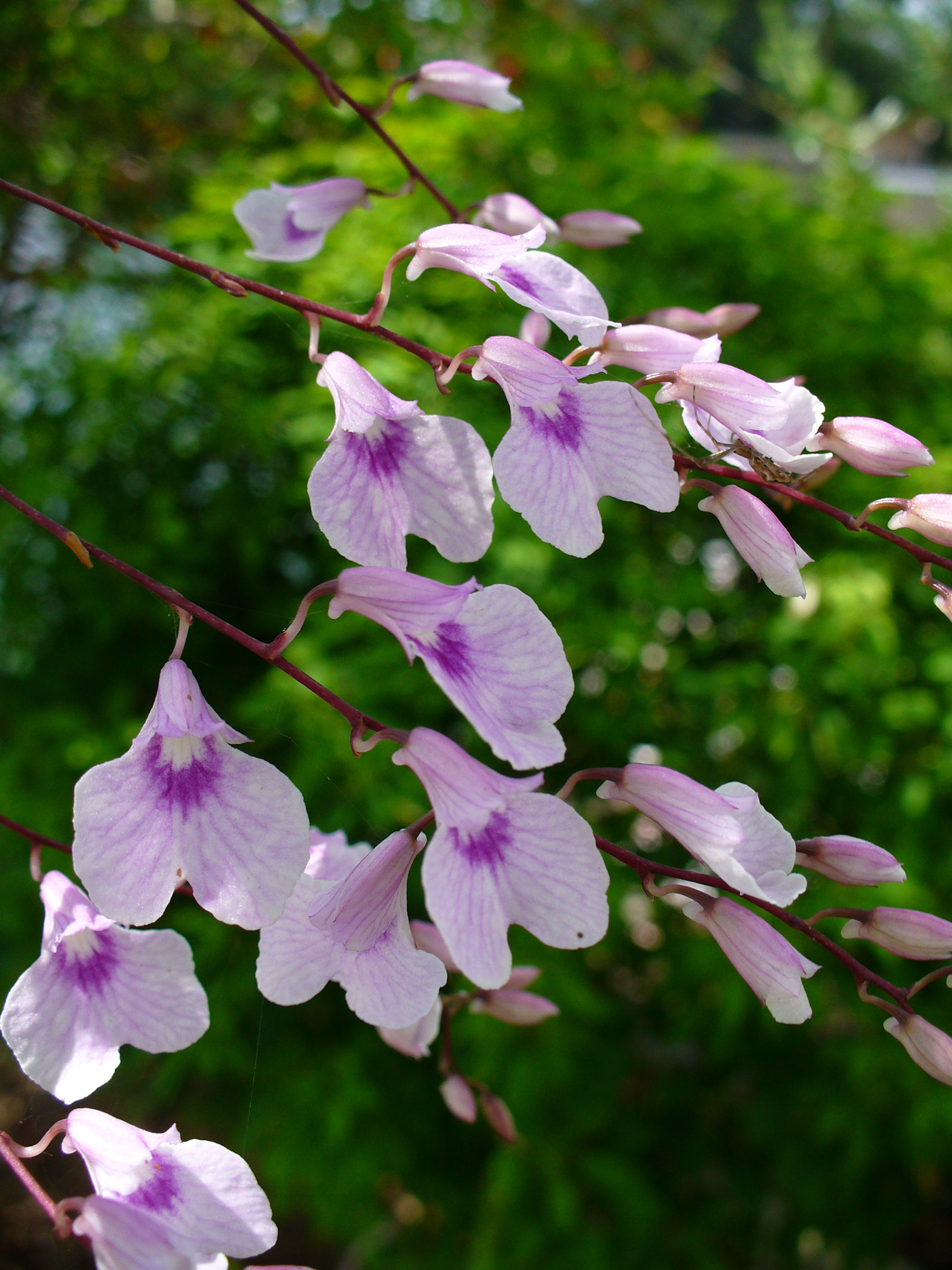
- Ionopsis utricularioides

Scientific classification
- Kingdom: Plantae
- Clade: Tracheophytes
- Clade: Angiosperms
- Clade: Monocots
- Order: Asparagales
- Family: Orchidaceae
- Subfamily: Epidendroideae
- Tribe: Cymbidieae
- Subtribe: Oncidiinae
- Genus: Ionopsis; Kunth

Type species
- Ionopsis utricularioides (Sw.) Lindl.

Synonyms
- Iantha Hook.; Cybelion Spreng.; Konantzia Dodson & N.H.Williams

= Ionopsis =

Genus of orchids

Ionopsis (violet orchid) is a genus of flowering plants from the orchid family, Orchidaceae. It contains 6 currently accepted species, native to Latin America, the West Indies, and Florida.

1. Ionopsis burchellii Rchb.f. - Brazil
2. Ionopsis minutiflora (Dodson & N.H.Williams) Pupulin - Ecuador
3. Ionopsis papillosa Pupulin - Ecuador
4. Ionopsis satyrioides (Sw.) Rchb.f. in W.G.Walpers - widespread across southern Mexico, Central America, the West Indies, and South America
5. Ionopsis utricularioides (Sw.) Lindl. - widespread across southern Mexico, Central America, the West Indies, South America, and Florida
6. Ionopsis zebrina Kraenzl. - Colombia

== See also ==
- List of Orchidaceae genera
