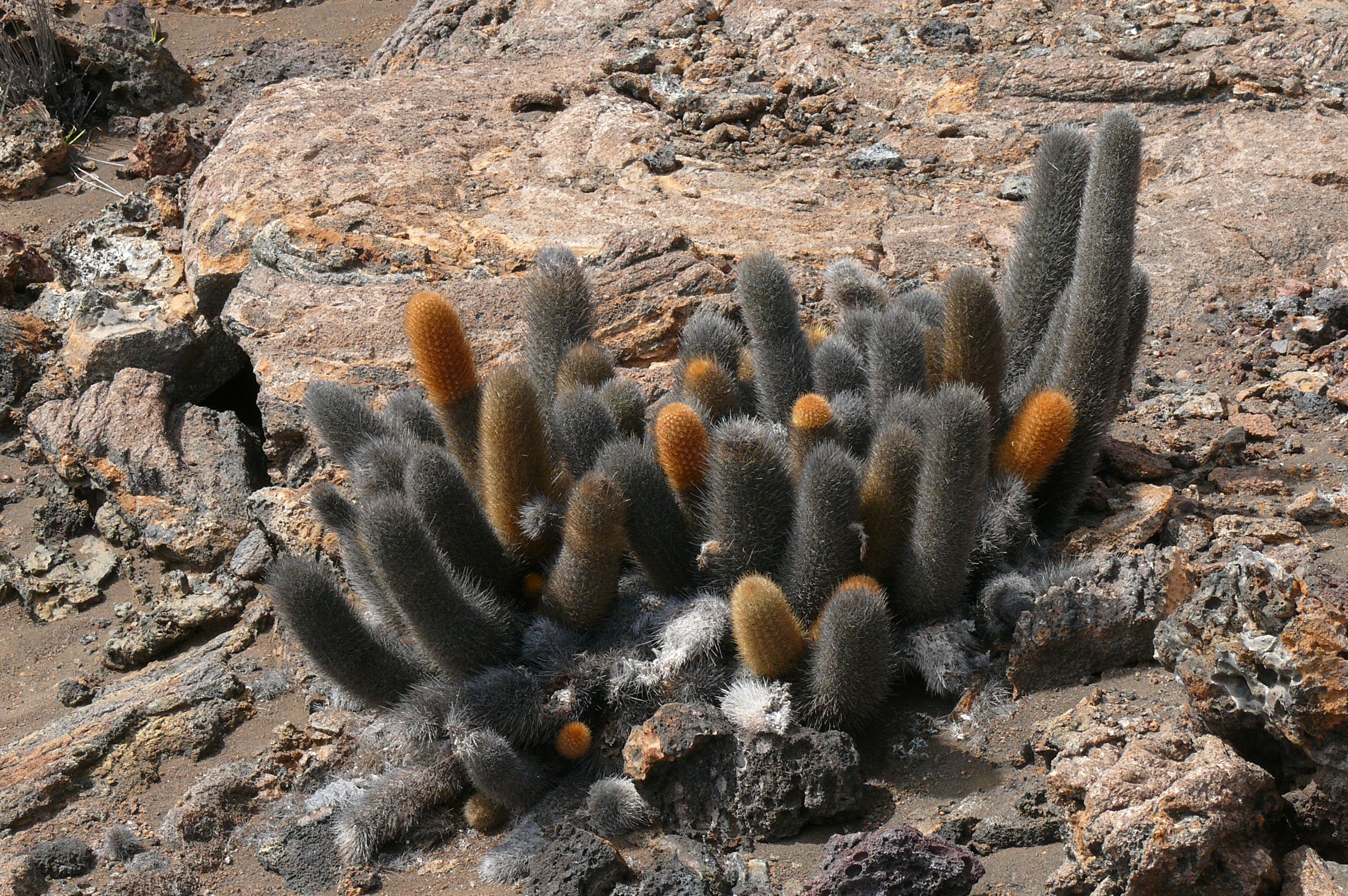

Conservation status
- Least Concern (IUCN 3.1)

Scientific classification
- Kingdom: Plantae
- Clade: Tracheophytes
- Clade: Angiosperms
- Clade: Eudicots
- Order: Caryophyllales
- Family: Cactaceae
- Subfamily: Cactoideae
- Tribe: Echinocereeae
- Genus: Brachycereus; Britton & Rose
- Species: B. nesioticus

Binomial name
- Brachycereus nesioticus (K.Schum.) Backeb.

Synonyms
- Cereus nesioticus K.Schum.

= Lava cactus =

Species of cactus

The lava cactus is a species of cactus, Brachycereus nesioticus, the sole species of the genus Brachycereus. The plant is a colonizer of lava fields – hence its common name – where it forms spiny clumps up to 60 cm (24 in) tall. Its solitary white or yellowish white flowers open in the daytime. It is endemic to the Galápagos Islands.

== Description ==
The lava cactus is a leafless clump-forming species, with cylindrical stems typically up to 50–60 cm (20–24 in) tall in formations that can be as much as 2 m (6 ft 7 in) across. The stems have 16–22 ribs and are yellow, with green or brown tones. Each areole has up to 40 spines, up to 5 cm (2 in) long, initially yellowish, but becoming darker with age. The flowers are borne singly, and are narrowly funnel-shaped, up to 11 cm (4 3/8 in) long and 5.5 cm (2 1/8 in) across, with many spines on the lower part of the flower. They open in the daytime and are white to yellowish white inside. The remains of the flower stay attached to the fruit, which is a berry, red to brown in colour, covered with yellow spines and filled with many black seeds.

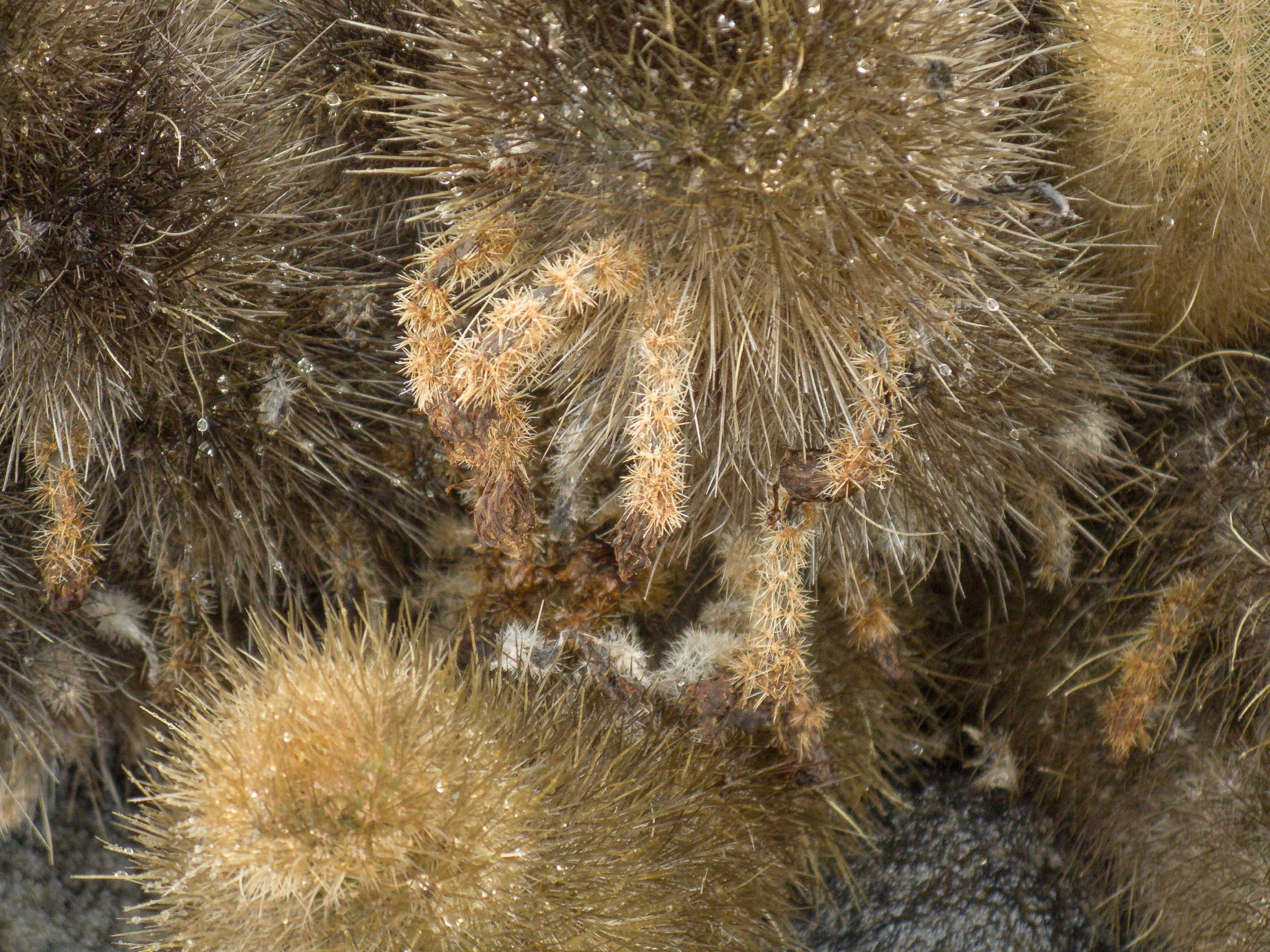
Remains of flowers showing spines on the lower part

== Taxonomy ==
The species was first described in 1902 as Cereus nesioticus by Karl Moritz Schumann in an account of the flora of Galápagos authored by Benjamin Lincoln Robinson. In 1920, Nathaniel Lord Britton and Joseph Nelson Rose erected the genus Brachycereus, synonymizing Cereus nesioticus and another cactus from the Galápagos, Cereus thouarsii, under the name Brachycereus thouarsii. In 1935, Curt Backeberg realized that only Cereus nesioticus belonged in Brachycereus (later placing Cereus thouarsii in Jasminocereus.)

Brachycereus means "short cereus"; nesioticus is derived from the Ancient Greek νησιωτικός, meaning "of the islands".

=== Phylogeny and classification ===
Molecular studies show that the two endemic Galápagos genera, Brachycereus and Jasminocereus, are sisters, with their closest relative being the South American mainland species Armatocereus:

- - Armatocereus
  - - Jasminocereus
    - Brachycereus

In one widely used classification of cacti, Brachycereus is placed in the tribe Trichocereeae of the subfamily Cactoideae, while Armatocereus and Jasminocereus are placed in the tribe Browningieae, which is inconsistent with the cladogram above. A classification produced in 2010 by Nyffeler and Eggli puts all three genera in a much larger tribe Phyllocacteae. The relationship with Armatocereus and Jasminocereus, both included in Echinocereeae, suggests it should also be placed in this tribe.

== Distribution and habitat ==
The lava cactus is endemic to the Galápagos, where it is found on Fernandina, Genovesa, Isabela, Pinta, Santa Cruz, and Santiago, as well as some smaller islands, including Bartolomé. It grows on barren lava flows, both pāhoehoe and ʻaʻā. It is one of the first species to grow on new lava flows.

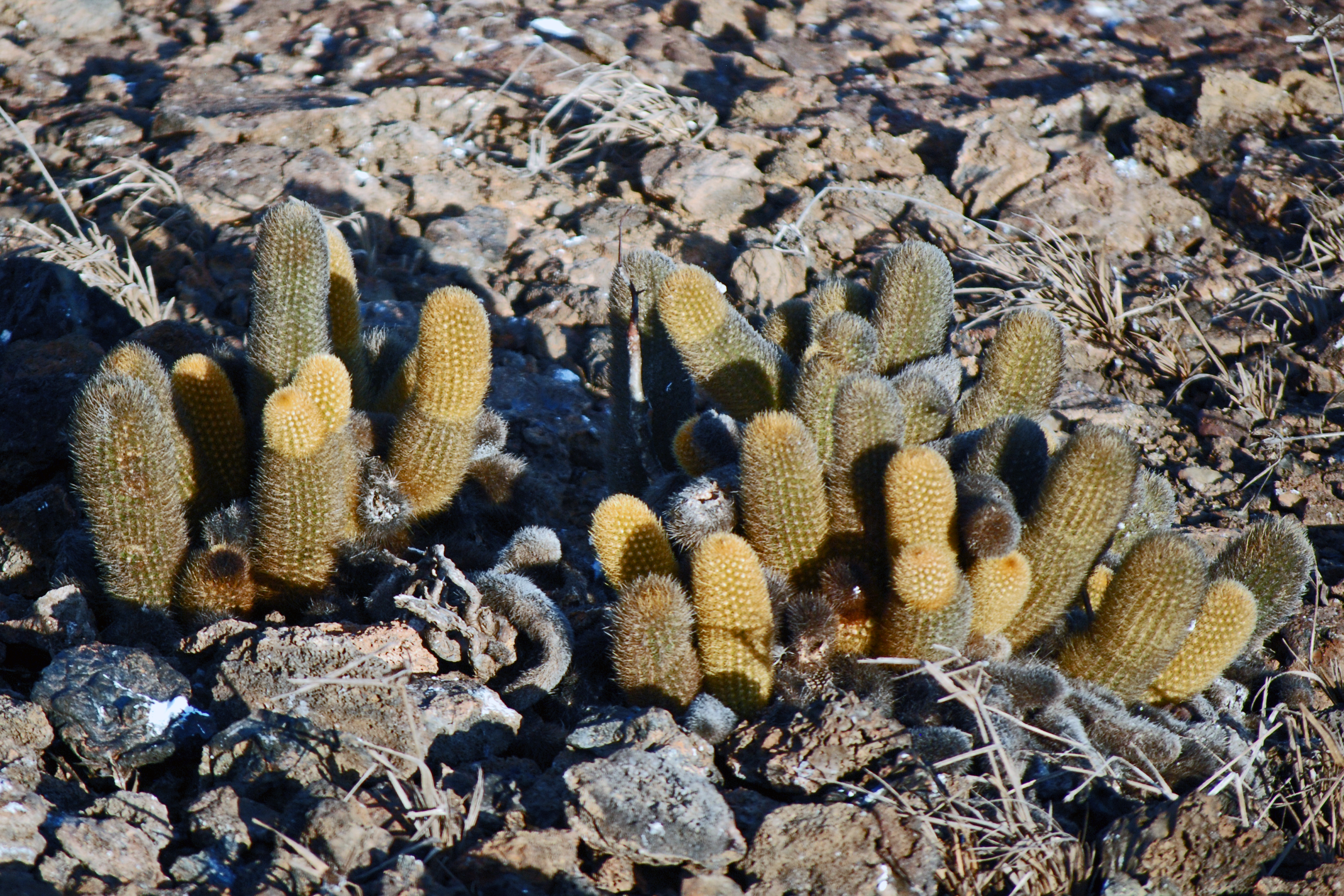
Brachycereus nesioticus growing in Darwin Bay, near Prince Philip's Steps, Genovesa, Island, Ecuador

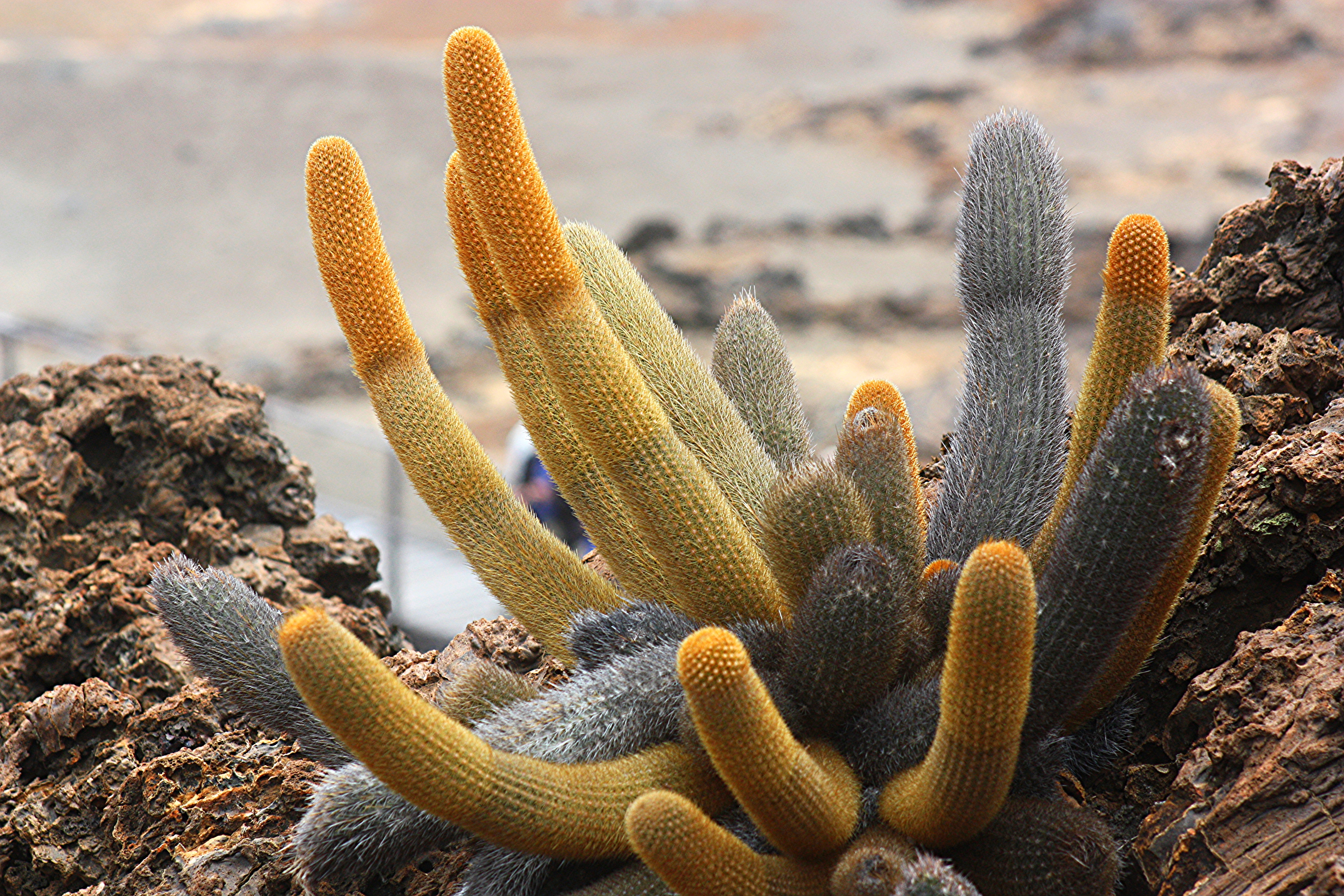
Brachycereus nesioticus in the Galapagos Islands.

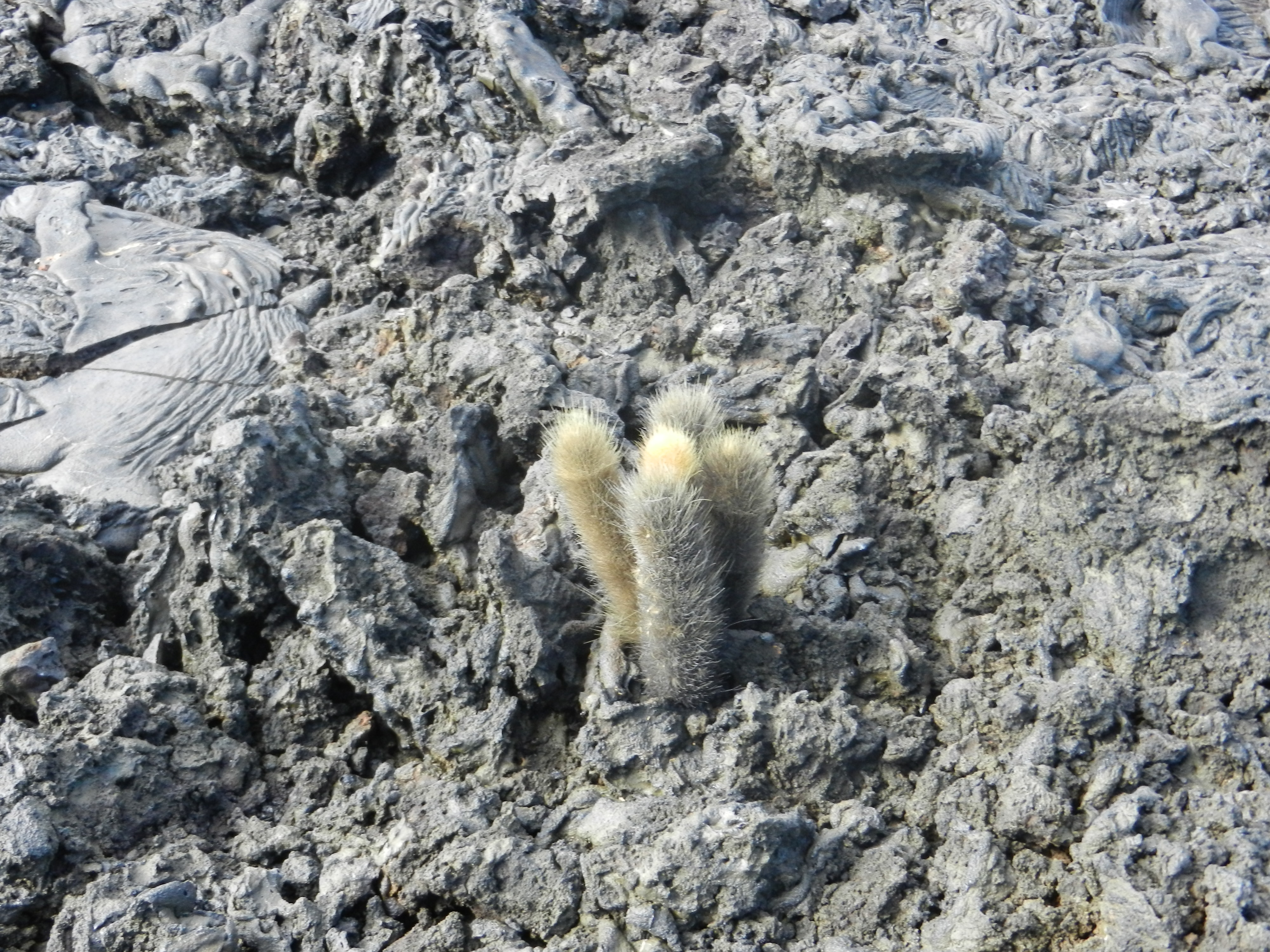
Colonizing bare lava

== Conservation ==
Brachycereus nesioticus was rated as "vulnerable" in the IUCN Red List of 2000, but this was downgraded to "least concern" in 2013. As with all plants and animals of the Galápagos, collecting or disturbing the lava cactus is strictly controlled by the Ecuadorian government; the complete range of the species lies within the Galápagos National Park and Natural World Heritage Site. Trade in the species is controlled under CITES Appendix II.
