= Tropidia territorialis =

Striped crown orchid

Scientific classification
- Kingdom: Plantae
- Clade: Tracheophytes
- Clade: Angiosperms
- Clade: Monocots
- Order: Asparagales
- Family: Orchidaceae
- Subfamily: Epidendroideae
- Genus: Tropidia
- Species: T. territorialis

Binomial name
- Tropidia territorialis D.L.Jones & M.A.Clem.

Species of orchid

Tropidia territorialis, commonly known as the striped crown orchid, is an evergreen, terrestrial plant with between three and six thin, pleated, dark green leaves and up to twenty crowded, green and white flowers. It is only known from about five places in the Northern Territory, Australia.

== Description ==
Tropidia territorialis is an evergreen, terrestrial herb with thin, upright stems 100–200 mm (4–8 in) tall with between three and six thin, pleated, dark green leaves 70–120 mm (3–5 in) long and 15–20 mm (0.6–0.8 in) wide. The leaves have five prominent veins. Above the leaves is a flowering stem 10–20 mm (0.4–0.8 in) long with between ten and twenty resupinate green and white flowers. The flowers open widely and are 8–10 mm (0.3–0.4 in) long and 6–8 mm (0.2–0.3 in) wide. The dorsal sepal is egg-shaped, 4–6 mm (0.16–0.24 in) long and about 3 mm (0.1 in) wide. The lateral sepals are a similar size to the dorsal sepal and are joined to each other for half their length then spread widely apart. The petals are about the same size as the sepals. The labellum is 5–6 mm (0.20–0.24 in) long, about 4 mm (0.2 in) wide with a pouch at its base and its tip curved downwards. Flowering occurs between December and January.

== Taxonomy and naming ==
Tropidia territorialis was first formally described in 2004 by David Jones and Mark Clements and the description was published in The Orchadian.

== Distribution and habitat ==
The striped crown is only known from about five locations in monsoon rainforest in the Northern Territory including on Groote Eylandt.
