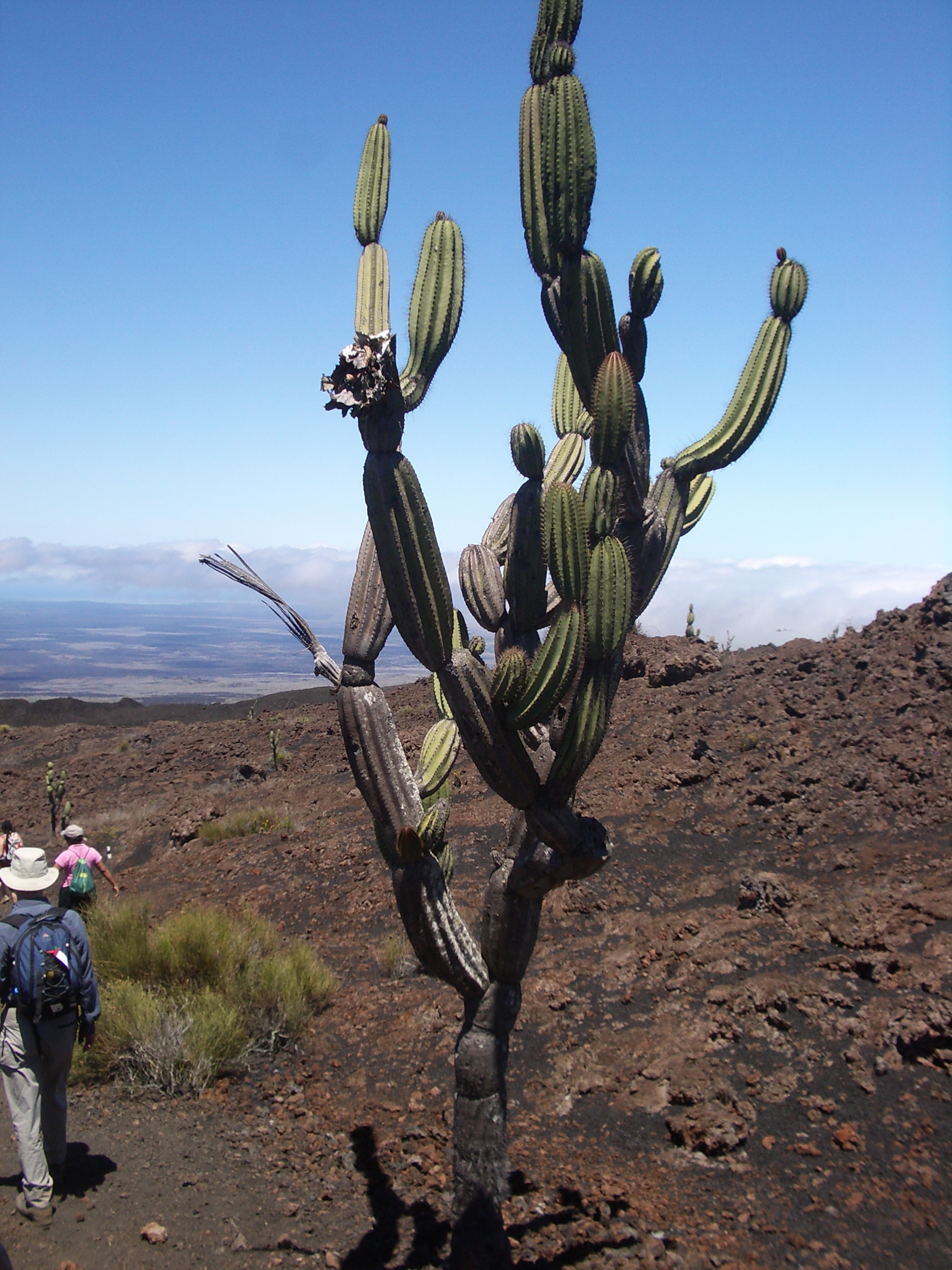

Conservation status
- Least Concern (IUCN 3.1)
- CITES Appendix II

Scientific classification
- Kingdom: Plantae
- Clade: Tracheophytes
- Clade: Angiosperms
- Clade: Eudicots
- Order: Caryophyllales
- Family: Cactaceae
- Subfamily: Cactoideae
- Tribe: Echinocereeae
- Genus: Jasminocereus; Britton & Rose
- Species: J. thouarsii

Binomial name
- Jasminocereus thouarsii (F.A.C.Weber) Backeb.

Synonyms
- Cereus thouarsii F.A.C.Weber; Brachycereus thouarsii (F.A.C.Weber) Britton & Rose; Cereus galapagensis F.A.C.Weber; Jasminocereus galapagensis (F.A.C.Weber) Britton & Rose; Cereus sclerocarpus K.Schum.; Jasminocereus sclerocarpus (K.Schum.) Backeb.; Jasminocereus howellii E.Y.Dawson

= Jasminocereus =

Genus of cacti

Jasminocereus (meaning "jasmine-like cereus", referring to the flowers) is a genus of cacti with only one species, Jasminocereus thouarsii, endemic to the Galápagos Islands, territorially a part of Ecuador. In English it is often called the candelabra cactus (a name used for other cacti with a similar appearance). At maturity it has a branched, treelike habit, and may be up to 7 m (23 ft) tall. The stems are made up of individual sections with constrictions between them. Its creamy white to greenish flowers open at night and are followed by greenish to reddish fruits.

== Description ==
Jasminocereus thouarsiii is a leafless treelike cactus growing to 7 m (23 ft) tall, with green or greenish yellow branching stems made up of individual sections 10–50 cm (4–20 in) long. The trunk and branches have 11–22 ribs. The areoles have up to 35 spines, each up to 9 cm (3 1/2 in) long. The spines vary in colour from white through to black, darkening with age. The flowers, borne singly, open at night, and are up to 6 cm (2 1/4 in) across, with many creamy white to yellow or olive green petals and numerous stamens. The fruit is a berry, greenish to reddish purple in colour, containing many black seeds. Three varieties are recognized by some sources; they are said to vary in height, flower texture and fruit colour, among other features.

=== Varieties ===
Three varieties are sometimes recognized:

Image	Name	Description	Distribution
	Jasminocereus thouarsii var. thouarsii	Has flowers that are not waxy and green fruits. It is usually under 4 m (13 ft) tall.	The islands of Floreana, Isabela, San Cristóbal and Santa Cruz.
	Jasminocereus thouarsii var. delicatus (E.Y.Dawson) E.F.Anderson & Walk.	Has flowers that are not waxy and reddish purple fruits. This species is most likely to be seen by visitors to the Galápagos.	It is found on Santa Cruz and Santiago,
	Jasminocereus thouarsii var. sclerocarpus (Schum.) E.F.Anderson & Walk.	Has waxy flowers and green fruits, and the largest number of spines per areole.	It occurs only on Fernandina and Isabela.

Following David Hunt et al. in 2006, the IUCN Red List does not recognize any varieties.

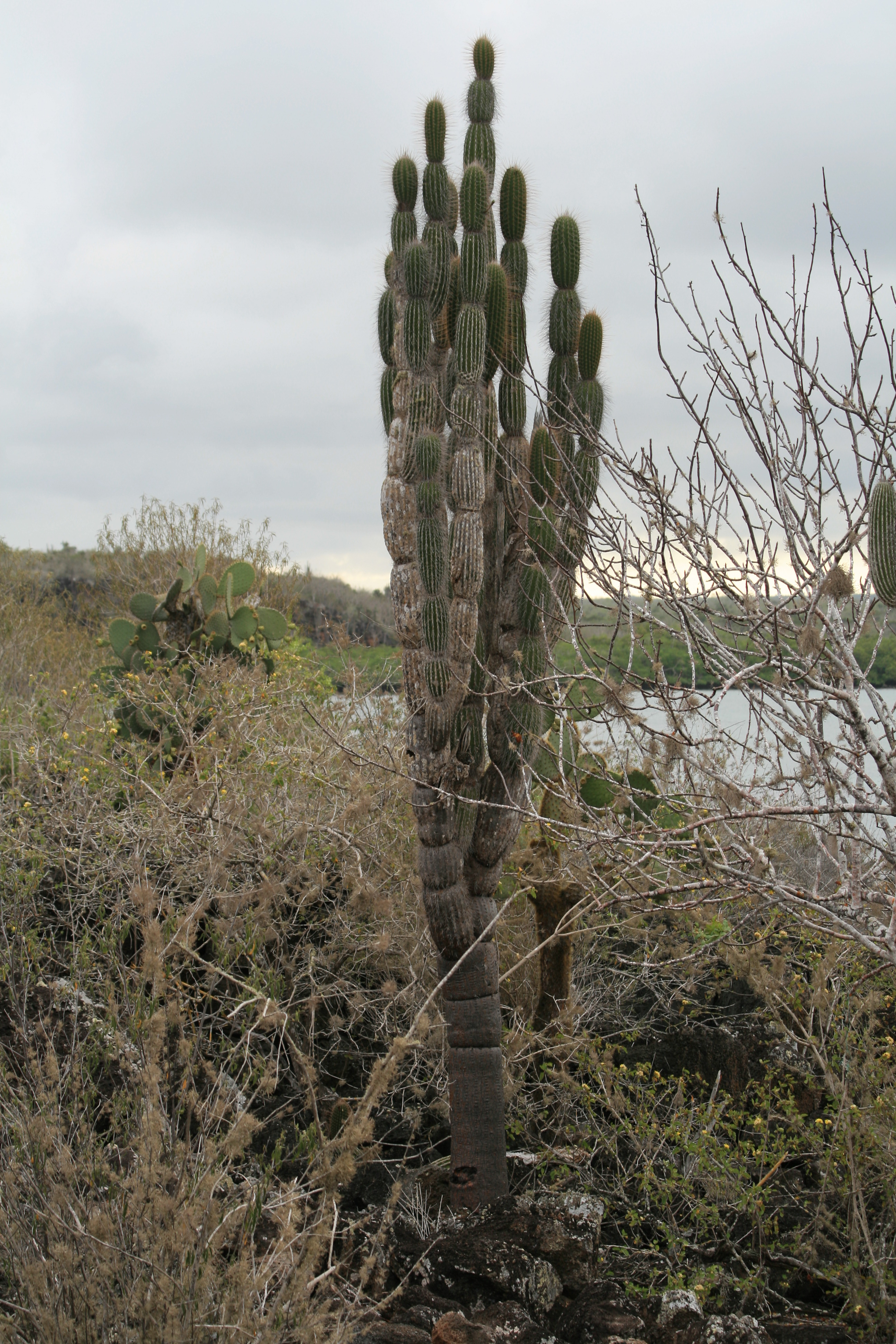
Growth habit

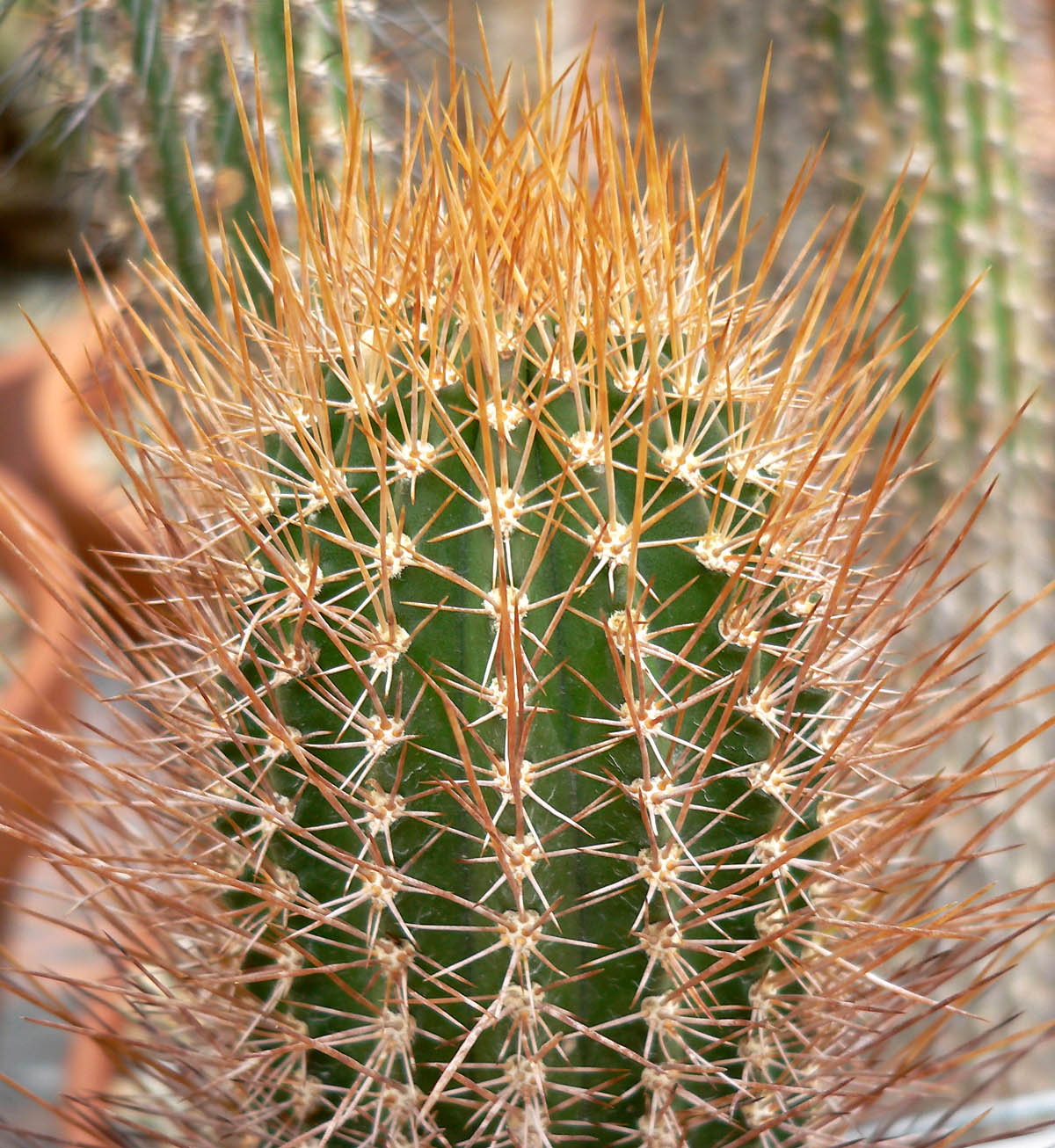
Stems

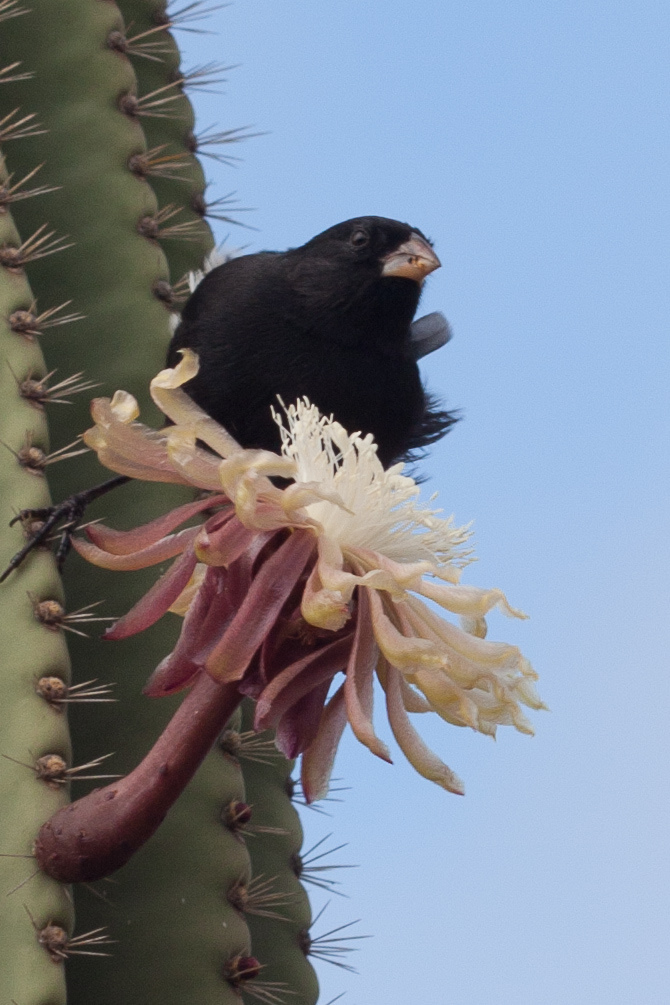
Flower

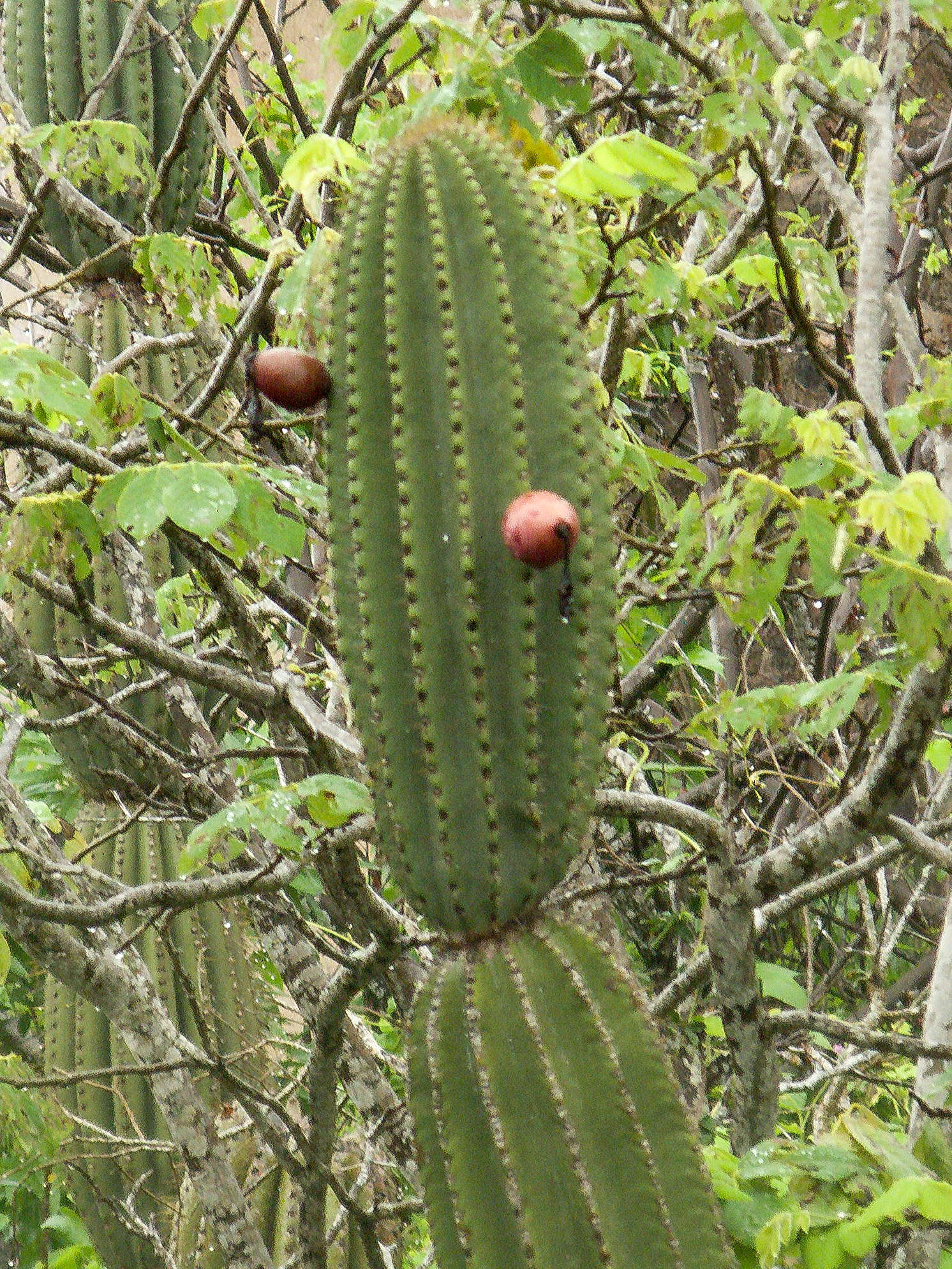
Fruit

== Taxonomy ==
The nomenclature of the genus and species is somewhat tangled. In 1899, Frédéric Weber described two species, Cereus thouarsii and Cereus galapagensis. His descriptions are brief and refer in part to information received from others; he also notes that neither the flowers nor the fruit of Cereus galapagensis were known. The specific epithet thouarsii refers to Abel Aubert du Petit-Thouars, who found both species some 30 years earlier when his ship visited the Galápagos. In 1920, Nathaniel Lord Britton and Joseph Nelson Rose erected the genus Brachycereus, synonymizing both Weber's Cereus thouarsii and another cactus from the Galápagos, Cereus nesioticus, under the name Brachycereus thouarsii. They placed Weber's Cereus galapagensis in a separate new genus, Jasminocereus, as Jasminocereus galapagensis. In 1935, Curt Backeberg realized that only Cereus nesioticus was the Brachycereus of Britton and Rose, and later placed Weber's Cereus thouarsii in Jasminocereus. In 1971, Anderson and Walkington carried out fieldwork and studied herbarium material, and decided that Weber's two species were actually the juvenile and mature forms of the same species. The earliest epithet for the species is thouarsii.

Additional species of Jasminocereus have been described, but they are now regarded as part of a single species, which may be divided into three varieties. J. sclerocarpus is then a synonym of J. thouarsii var. sclerocarpus and J. howellii of J. thouarsii var. delicatus. Other sources do not recognize distinct varieties.

=== Phylogeny and classification ===
Molecular studies show that the two endemic Galápagos genera, Jasminocereus and Brachycereus, are sisters, with their closest relative being the South American mainland species Armatocereus:

- - Armatocereus
  - - Jasminocereus
    - Brachycereus

In one widely used classification of cacti, Armatocereus and Jasminocereus are placed in the tribe Browningieae of the subfamily Cactoideae, and Brachycereus is placed in the tribe Trichocereeae, which is inconsistent with the cladogram above. A classification produced in 2010 by Nyffeler and Eggli puts all three genera in a much larger tribe Phyllocacteae.

== Distribution and habitat ==
Jasminocereus thouarsii is endemic to the Galápagos, where it is found on Fernandina, Floreana, Isabela, San Cristóbal, Santa Cruz and Santiago, plus some islets, including Bartolomé. It is found in arid areas, from the coast up to about 300 m (980 ft) on the larger islands.

== Conservation ==
Jasminocereus thouarsii was rated as "vulnerable" in the IUCN Red List of 2002, but this was downgraded to "least concern" in 2013. As with all plants and animals of the Galápagos, collecting or disturbing J. thouarsii is strictly controlled by the Ecuadorian government; the complete range of the species lies within the Galápagos National Park and Natural World Heritage Site. Trade in the species is controlled under CITES Appendix II.

== Uses ==
The fruits of Jasminocereus thouarsii (particularly var. delicatus for those who distinguish varieties) have been used to make a fruit juice described as "refreshing".

== See also ==
- Category:Cacti of South America
- Category:Endemic flora of the Galápagos Islands
