= Tropidia viridifusca =

Dark crown orchid

Scientific classification
- Kingdom: Plantae
- Clade: Tracheophytes
- Clade: Angiosperms
- Clade: Monocots
- Order: Asparagales
- Family: Orchidaceae
- Subfamily: Epidendroideae
- Genus: Tropidia
- Species: T. viridifusca

Binomial name
- Tropidia viridifusca Kraenzl.

Species of orchid

Tropidia viridifusca, commonly known as the dark crown orchid, is an evergreen, terrestrial plant with thin, pleated, dark green leaves on a thin, upright stem with up to seven green and brown flowers crowded on a short flowering stem on top. It is only known from three Pacific Islands near Australia.

== Description ==
Tropidia viridifusca is an evergreen, terrestrial herb with thin but tough, upright stems 150–300 mm (6–10 in) tall with between four and seven thin, pleated, dark green leaves 50–150 mm (2–6 in) long and 10–20 mm (0.4–0.8 in) wide. The leaves have three prominent veins. Above the leaves is a flowering stem about 10 mm (0.4 in) long with between two and seven green and brown flowers. The flowers open widely and are 8–10 mm (0.3–0.4 in) long and 6–8 mm (0.2–0.3 in) wide. The sepal are 8–9 mm (0.31–0.35 in) long and 3–4 mm (0.1–0.2 in) wide with the lateral sepals spreading widely apart from each other. The petals are 7–8 mm (0.28–0.31 in) long and 2–3 mm (0.08–0.1 in) wide. The labellum is 6–8 mm (0.24–0.31 in) long, about 3 mm (0.1 in) wide and brown to almost black with a thick pouch at its base. Flowering occurs between December and January.

== Taxonomy and naming ==
Tropidia viridifusca was first formally described in 1929 by Friedrich Wilhelm Ludwig Kraenzlin and the description was published in Vierteljahrsschrift der Naturforschenden Gesellschaft in Zürich. The specific epithet (viridifusca) is derived from the Latin words viridis meaning "green" and fuscus meaning "dusky" or "tawny".

== Distribution and habitat ==
The dark crown is only known from Grande Terre in New Caledonia, Vanuatu and Norfolk Island where it grows on slopes in shady forest.
