= Pinnacle Rock (Galápagos) =

Rock formation on Bartolomé Island, Ecuador

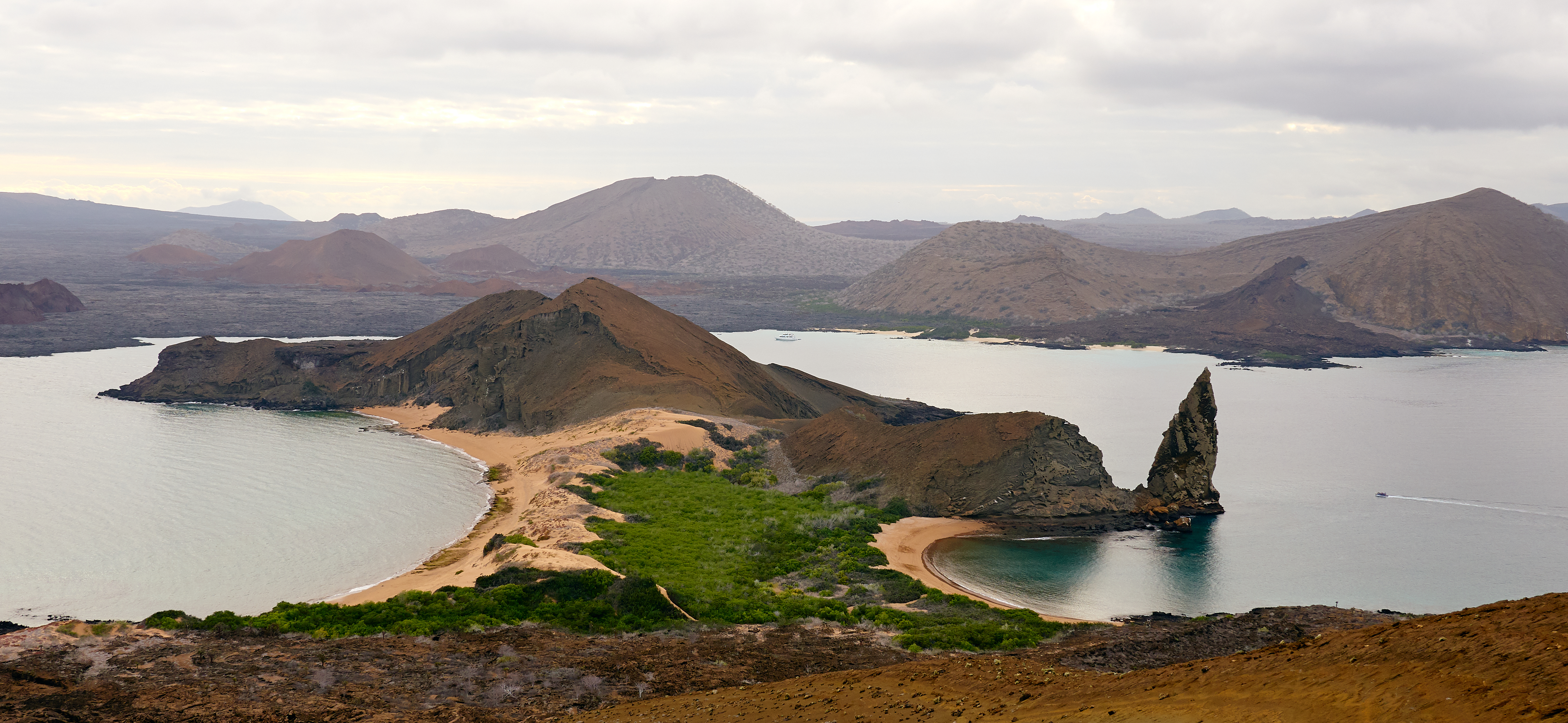
Pinnacle Rock on Sulivan Bay, with Bartolomé Island in the foreground and Santiago in the background

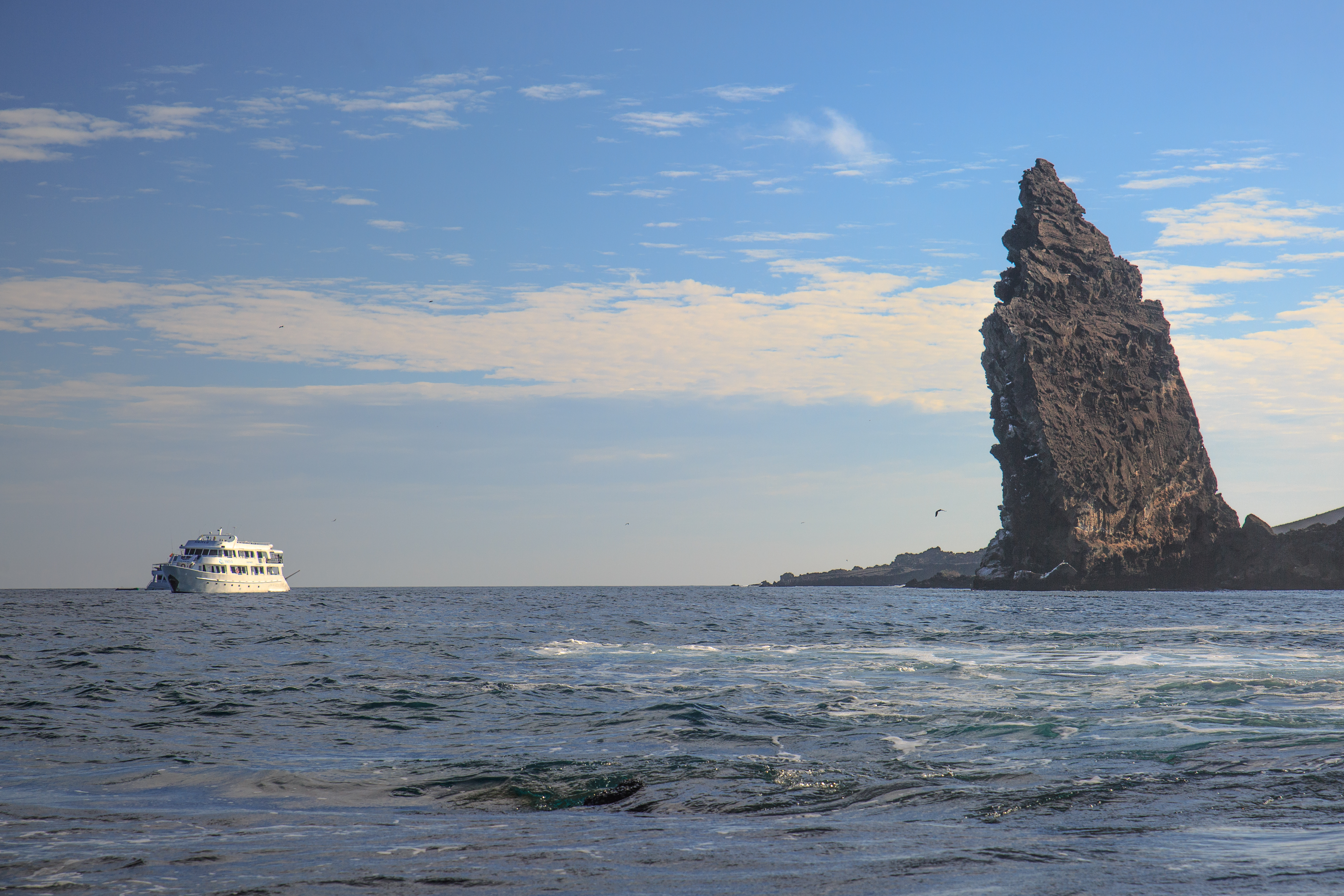
Pinnacle Rock (2015)

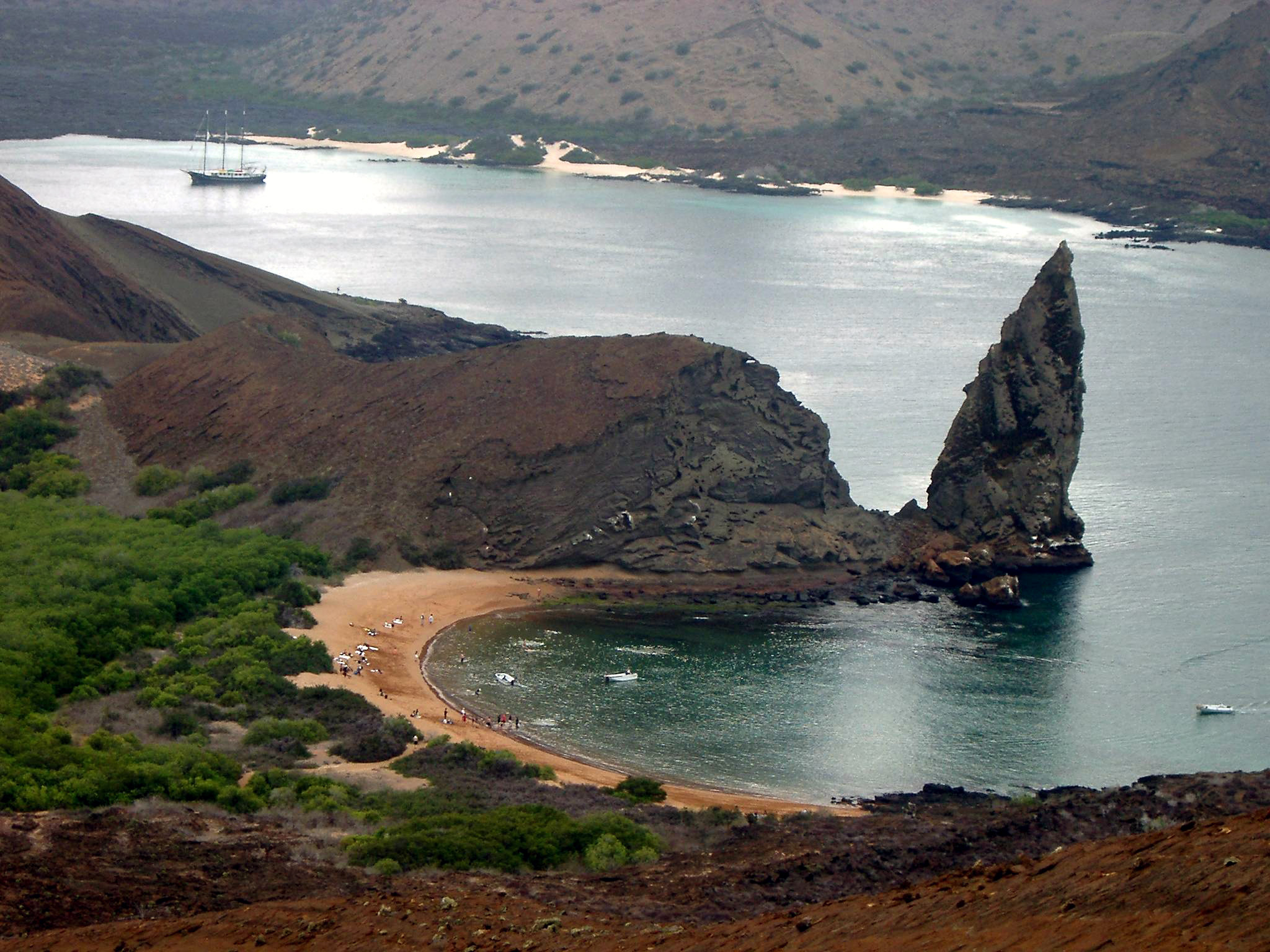
Pinnacle Rock with Santiago in the background

Pinnacle Rock (Spanish: Roca del Pináculo) is a distinctive volcanic plug on Bartolomé Island, one of Ecuador's Galápagos Islands. It is beside Sulivan Bay, part of a channel that separates Bartolomé from nearby Santiago Island. The rock is part of a now largely eroded volcanic dike that once connected the two islands. Several endemic species of lichen in the genus Ramalina have been found on Pinnacle Rock.

Travel writers describe the rock as one of the most spectacular views in the Islands. A colony of penguins makes its home at the foot of the rock. Tourists dive in scenic reefs offshore of the rock.
