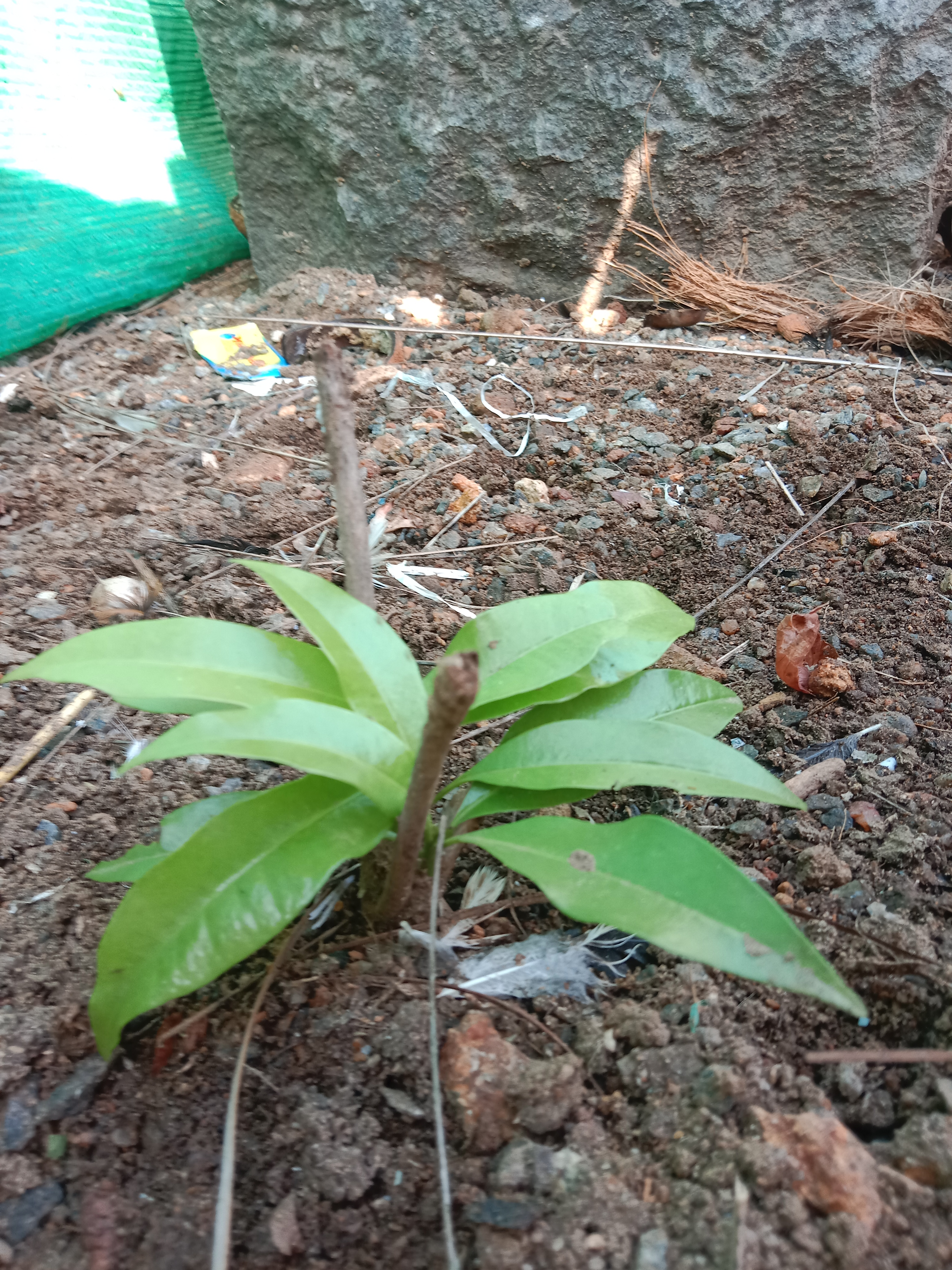

Conservation status
- Secure (NatureServe)

Scientific classification
- Kingdom: Plantae
- Clade: Tracheophytes
- Clade: Angiosperms
- Clade: Monocots
- Order: Asparagales
- Family: Orchidaceae
- Subfamily: Orchidoideae
- Genus: Habenaria
- Species: H. distans

Binomial name
- Habenaria distans Griseb.

Synonyms
- Habenaria distans var. jamaicensis (Fawc. & Rendle) Cogn. in I.Urban; Habenaria jamaicensis Fawc. & Rendle; Habenaria amparoana Schltr.

= Habenaria distans =

Species of orchid

Habenaria distans, the hammock bog orchid, is a species of orchid. It is native to Latin America from Mexico to Argentina, as well as Florida, the Greater Antilles, and the Galápagos.
