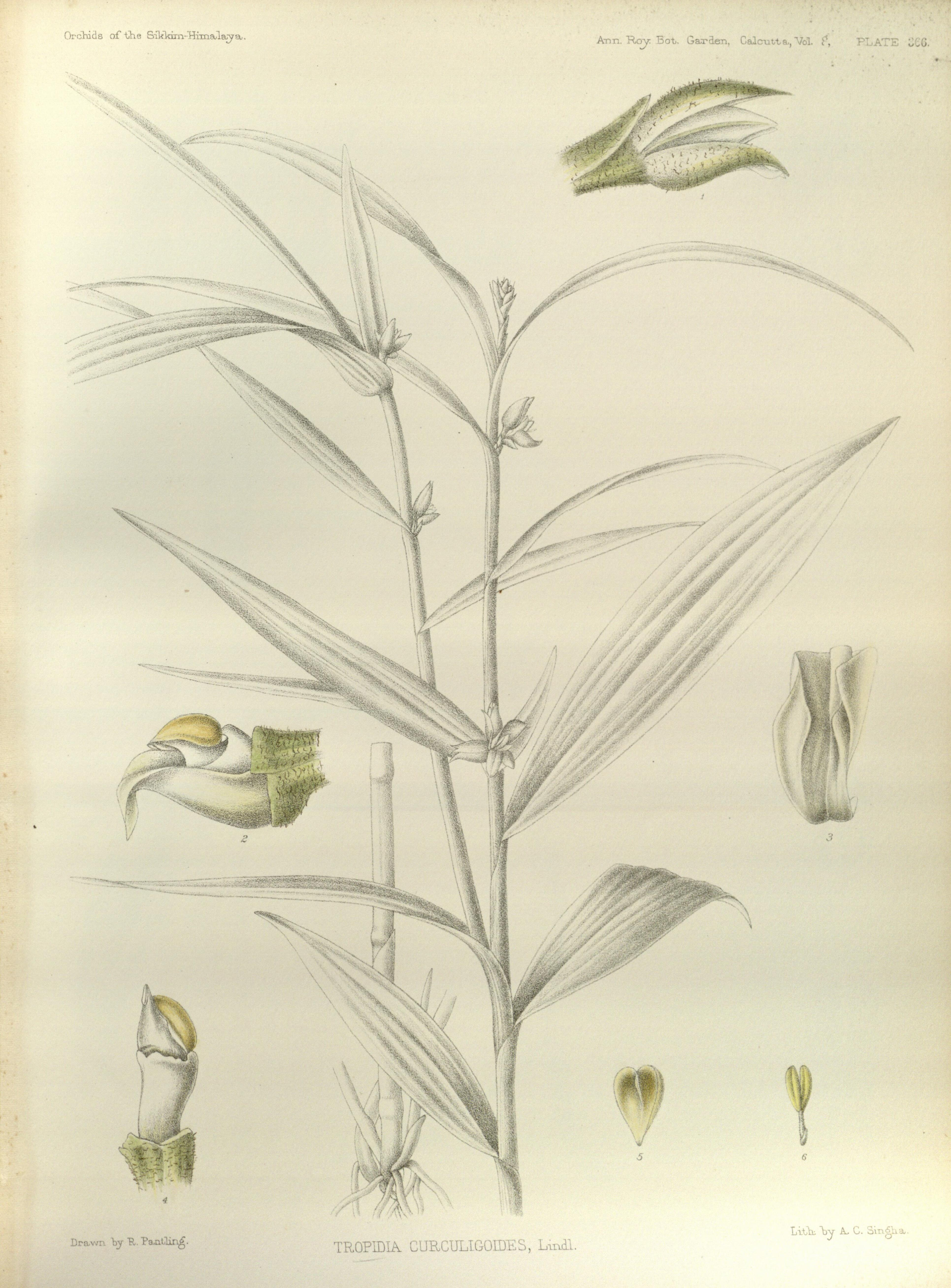
- Tropidia curculigoides - the type species

Scientific classification
- Kingdom: Plantae
- Clade: Tracheophytes
- Clade: Angiosperms
- Clade: Monocots
- Order: Asparagales
- Family: Orchidaceae
- Subfamily: Epidendroideae
- Tribe: Tropidieae
- Genus: Tropidia; Lindl.

Synonyms
- Chloidia Lindl.; Cnemidia Lindl.; Decaisnea Lindl. ex Wall. nom. nud.; Govindooia Wight; Kalimantanorchis Tsukaya, M.Nakaj. & H.Okada; Muluorchis J.J.Wood; Ptychochilus Schauer; Schoenomorphus Thorel ex Gagnep.

= Tropidia (plant) =

Crown orchids

Genus of orchids

Tropidia, commonly known as crown orchids, is a genus of about thirty species of evergreen terrestrial orchids in the family Orchidaceae. They have thin, wiry stems with two or more tough, pleated leaves with a flowering spike at the top of the stem, bearing crowded flowers. Species in this genus are distributed across the warmer parts of both the Eastern and Western Hemispheres.

== Description ==
Orchids in the genus Tropidia are evergreen, terrestrial, sometimes mycotrophic herbs which form small clumps. They have thin, wiry stems, sometimes with a few branches. The stems have two or more thin, tough, pleated, lance-shaped to egg-shaped leaves. Crowded white, greenish or brown, sometimes resupinate flowers are arranged on the top of the stem and have the sepals and petals free from each other, or with the lateral sepals joined and surrounding the base of the labellum. The labellum is not lobed but has a pouch or spur at its base.

== Taxonomy and naming ==
The genus Tropidia was first formally described in 1833 by John Lindley and the description was published in Edwards's Botanical Register. The name Tropidia is derived from the Ancient Greek word tropidos or tropideion meaning "keel", referring to the boat-shaped labellum of some species in this genus.

== Distribution and habitat ==
Species in the genus Tropidium grow in deep shade in evergreen monsoon forests and are native to China, Japan, the Indian subcontinent, Indonesia, Indochina, Philippines, New Guinea, Australia, Latin America (from Mexico to Ecuador), the West Indies, Florida, and some Pacific Islands including the Solomons, Fiji, New Caledonia, the Galápagos and Vanuatu.

== Species ==
The following is a list of species of Tropidia recognised by Plants of the World Online as at October 2025:

- Tropidia angulosa (Lindl.) Blume - Guangxi, Taiwan, Tibet, Yunnan, Bhutan, India, Assam, Bangladesh, Java, Sumatra, Japan, Malaysia, Myanmar, Thailand, Vietnam
- Tropidia bambusifolia (Thwaites) Trimen - southern India, Sri Lanka, Andaman Islands
- Tropidia capitata (Thorel ex Gagnep.) Ormerod
- Tropidia connata J.J.Wood & A.L.Lamb - Sabah
- Tropidia corymbioides Schltr. - New Guinea
- Tropidia curculigoides Lindl. - widespread across southern China, the Himalayas, the Andaman Islands, Indochina, much of Indonesia, New Guinea, New Caledonia, and the Northern Territory of Australia
- Tropidia disticha Schltr. - New Guinea, Solomons, Bismarcks
- Tropidia effusa Rchb.f. - Fiji, Samoa
- Tropidia emeishanica K.Y.Lang - Sichuan
- Tropidia formosana Rolfe ex Hemsl.
- Tropidia gracilis Schltr. - New Guinea
- Tropidia hegderaoi S.Misra
- Tropidia janowskyi J.J.Sm. - New Guinea
- Tropidia kjellbergii Ormerod & Juswara
- Tropidia maxwellii Ormerod
- Tropidia mindanaensis Ames - Mindanao
- Tropidia mindorensis Ames - Mindoro
- Tropidia multiflora J.J.Sm. - Sumba
- Tropidia multinervis Schltr. - New Guinea
- Tropidia nagamasui (Tsukaya, M.Nakaj. & H.Okada) Ormerod & Juswara
- Tropidia namasiae C.K.Liao, T.P.Lin & M.S.Tang.
- Tropidia nipponica Masam. - Japan, Taiwan, Ryukyu Islands
  - Tropidia nipponica var. hachijoensis F.Maek. & Yokota
  - Tropidia nipponica var. nipponica
- Tropidia pedunculata Blume - widespread from the western Himalayas to New Guinea, including Indochina, Malaysia, Philippines and much of Indonesia
- Tropidia polystachya (Sw.) Ames - Florida, Mexico, Central America, West Indies (including Bahamas and Cayman Islands), Venezuela, Colombia, Ecuador (including Galápagos)
- Tropidia ramosa J.J.Sm. - New Guinea
- Tropidia reichenbachiana Kraenzl. - Maluku
- Tropidia robinsonii Ames - Luzon
- Tropidia saprophytica J.J.Sm. - Borneo
- Tropidia schlechteriana J.J.Sm. - Maluku
- Tropidia septemnervis (Schauer) Rchb.f. - Philippines
- Tropidia similis Schltr. - New Guinea
- Tropidia somae Hayata - Taiwan, Ryukyu Islands, possibly Philippines
- Tropidia territorialis D.L.Jones & M.A.Clem. - Northern Territory of Australia
- Tropidia viridifusca Kraenzl. - Vanuatu, New Caledonia, Norfolk Island
