= Tropidia polystachya =

Young palm orchid

Scientific classification
- Kingdom: Plantae
- Clade: Tracheophytes
- Clade: Angiosperms
- Clade: Monocots
- Order: Asparagales
- Family: Orchidaceae
- Subfamily: Epidendroideae
- Genus: Tropidia
- Species: T. polystachya

Binomial name
- Tropidia polystachya (Swartz) Ames

Synonyms
- Serapias polystachya Sw.; Neottia polystachya (Sw.) Sw.; Stenorrhynchos polystachyon (Sw.) Spreng.; Tomotris polystachya (Sw.) Raf.; Chloidia polystachya (Sw.) Rchb.f. in W.G.Walpers; Corymborkis polystachya (Sw.) Kuntze

Species of orchid

Tropidia polystachya, the young palm orchid, is a species of orchid native to Mexico, Central America, Greater Antilles, Bahamas, Cayman Islands, Florida, Colombia, Venezuela, and Ecuador (including Galápagos).
