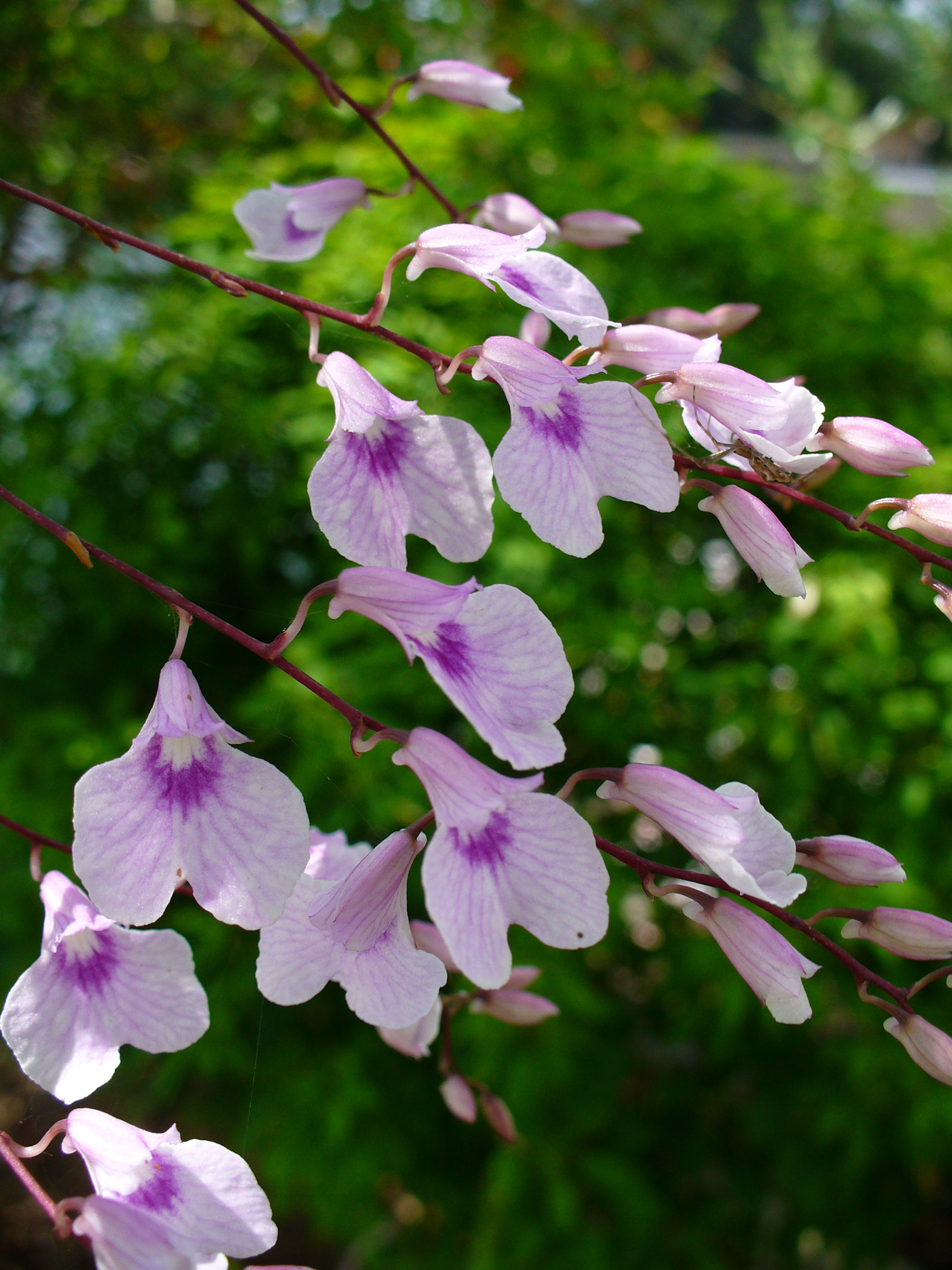

Scientific classification
- Kingdom: Plantae
- Clade: Tracheophytes
- Clade: Angiosperms
- Clade: Monocots
- Order: Asparagales
- Family: Orchidaceae
- Subfamily: Epidendroideae
- Genus: Ionopsis
- Species: I. utricularioides

Binomial name
- Ionopsis utricularioides (Sw.) Lindl.

Synonyms
- Epidendrum utricularioides Sw.; Dendrobium utricularioides (Sw.) Sw.; Cybelion utriculariae Spreng.; Ionopsis pulchella Kunth in F.W.H.von Humboldt, A.J.A.Bonpland & C.S.Kunth; Iantha pallidiflora Hook.; Cybelion pallidiflorum (Hook.) Spreng.; Cybelion pulchellum (Kunth) Spreng.; Epidendrum crenatum Vell.; Ionopsis pallidiflora (Hook.) Lindl.; Ionopsis paniculata Lindl.; Ionopsis tenera Lindl.; Scaphyglottis pallidiflora (Hook.) Lindl. in R.Sweet; Cybelion tenerum (Lindl.) Steud.; Ionopsis gardneri Lindl.; Ionopsis zonalis Lindl.; Epidendrum sessei Hoehne; also several names at the level of variety

= Ionopsis utricularioides =

Species of orchid

Ionopsis utricularioides, the delicate violet orchid, is an epiphytic orchid native to the warmer parts of the Americas. It is reported from Florida, Mexico (from Nayarit to Quintana Roo), Central America (all 7 countries), much of the West Indies including the Cayman Islands, South America as far south as Paraguay, and the Galápagos.
