= Bartolomé Island =

Island in Galápagos Province, Ecuador

- Location within Galápagos Islands

Geography
- Location: Galápagos Islands, Ecuador
- Coordinates: 0.285°S 90.549°W
- Archipelago: Galápagos Islands

Administration
- Ecuador

Bartolomé Island (Spanish: Isla Bartolomé) is an uninhabited 1.2 square kilometres (0.46 sq mi) volcanic islet located in Sullivan Bay, just east of Santiago Island, in the Galápagos Islands. just off the east coast of Santiago Island. The island, along with the bay it sits in, are named after naturalist Sir Bartholomew James Sulivan, who was a lieutenant aboard HMS Beagle. The island is a popular tourist destination, with attractions including the wildlife and the famous Pinnacle Rock that juts out over Sullivan Bay.

== Geography ==
Bartolomé Island lies in Sullivan Bay, just east of Santiago Island. The island is of volcanic origin, as most of the Galápagos Islands are, and its landscape is dotted with various geological formations reflecting this, the most famous of them being Pinnacle Rock, a distinctive volcanic plug made of thin layers of basalt. The island's peak sits at an elevation of 114 metres (374 ft).

== Ecology ==
The island and its waters are home to a variety of birds and sea-life. Birds on the island include masked boobies, blue-footed boobies, Audubon's shearwaters, magnificent frigatebirds, brown noddies, brown pelicans, herons, Galápagos hawks and Galápagos penguins, the last of which have established a small breeding colony on the island, located in a cave behind Pinnacle Rock. Sea-life that can be found in the waters surrounding the island includes sea lions, spotted eagle rays, red-lipped batfish, bentfin devil rays and other stingrays, blacktip sharks, whitetip reef sharks and green sea turtles, the last of which nests on the northern beach of the island. Blue agave grows on the island.

== Tourism ==
The island, which together with its Pinnacle Rock was featured in the 2003 movie Master and Commander: The Far Side of the World, is a popular tourist destination. In addition to Pinnacle Rock, the island's tourist attractions include a 600-meter (2,000 ft) trail to the island's peak and the northern beach of the island, where tourists are can swim and snorkel.

== Gallery ==
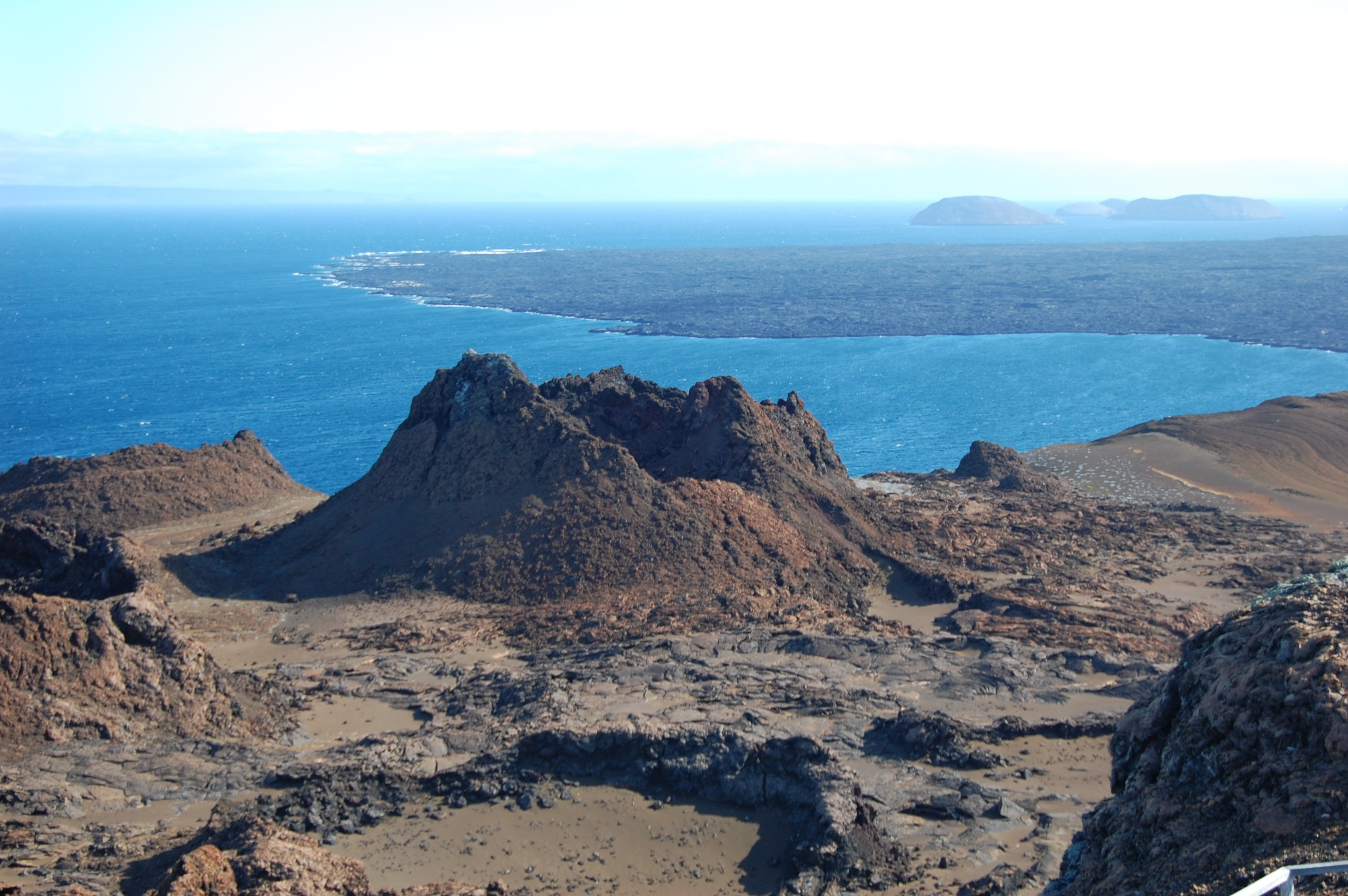
Spatter cone

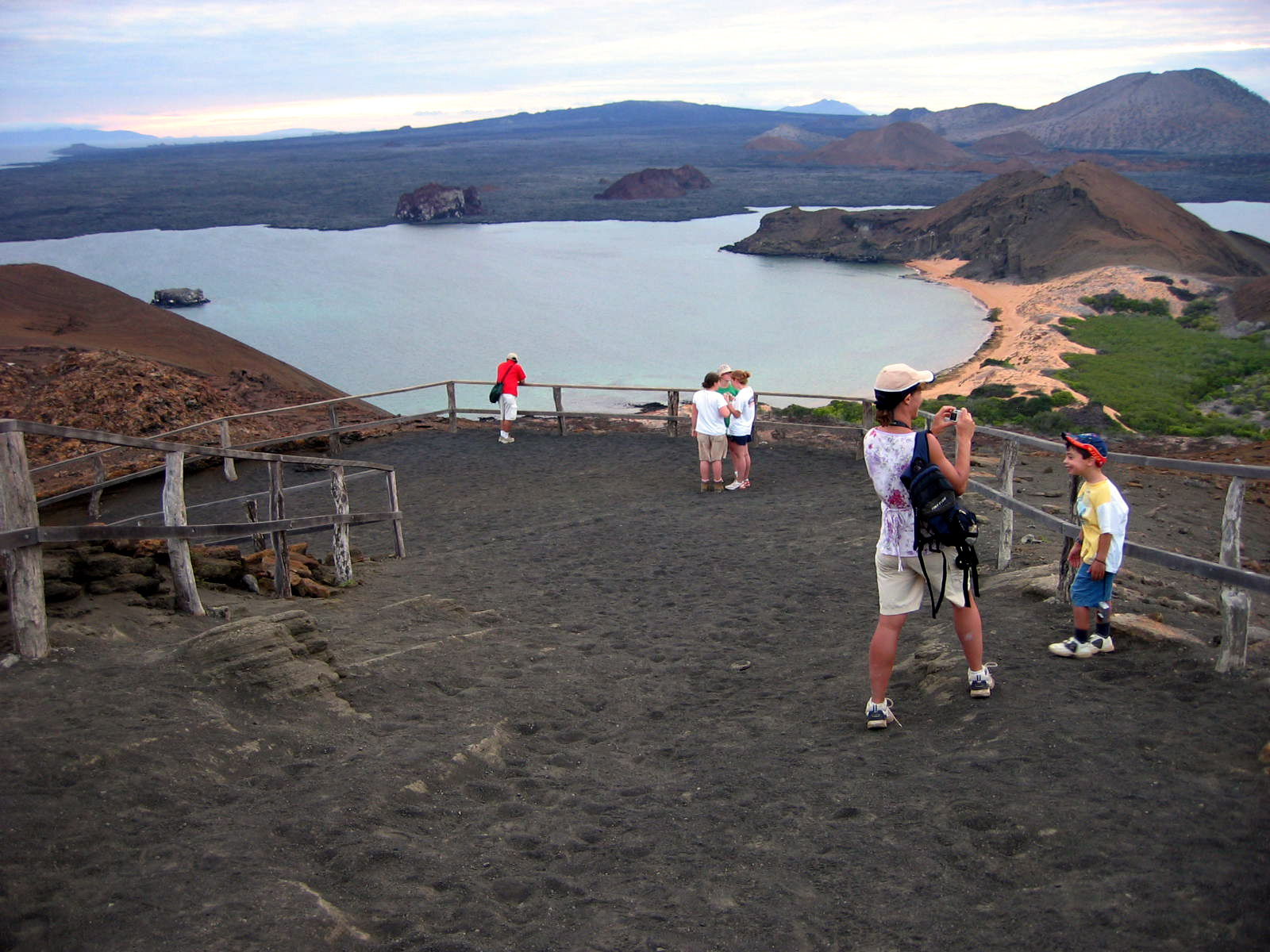
Pinnacle Rock Overlook

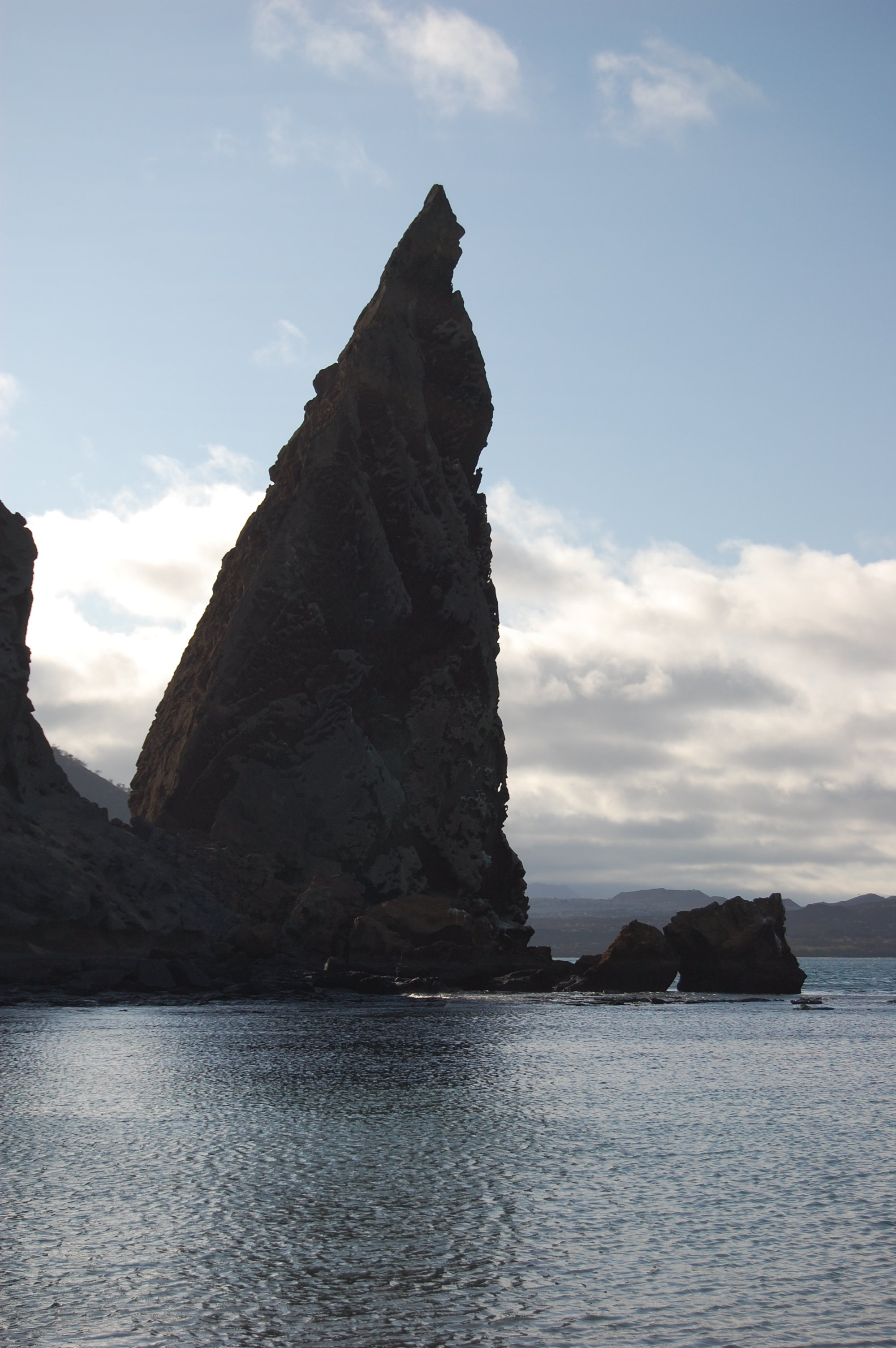
Pinnacle Rock

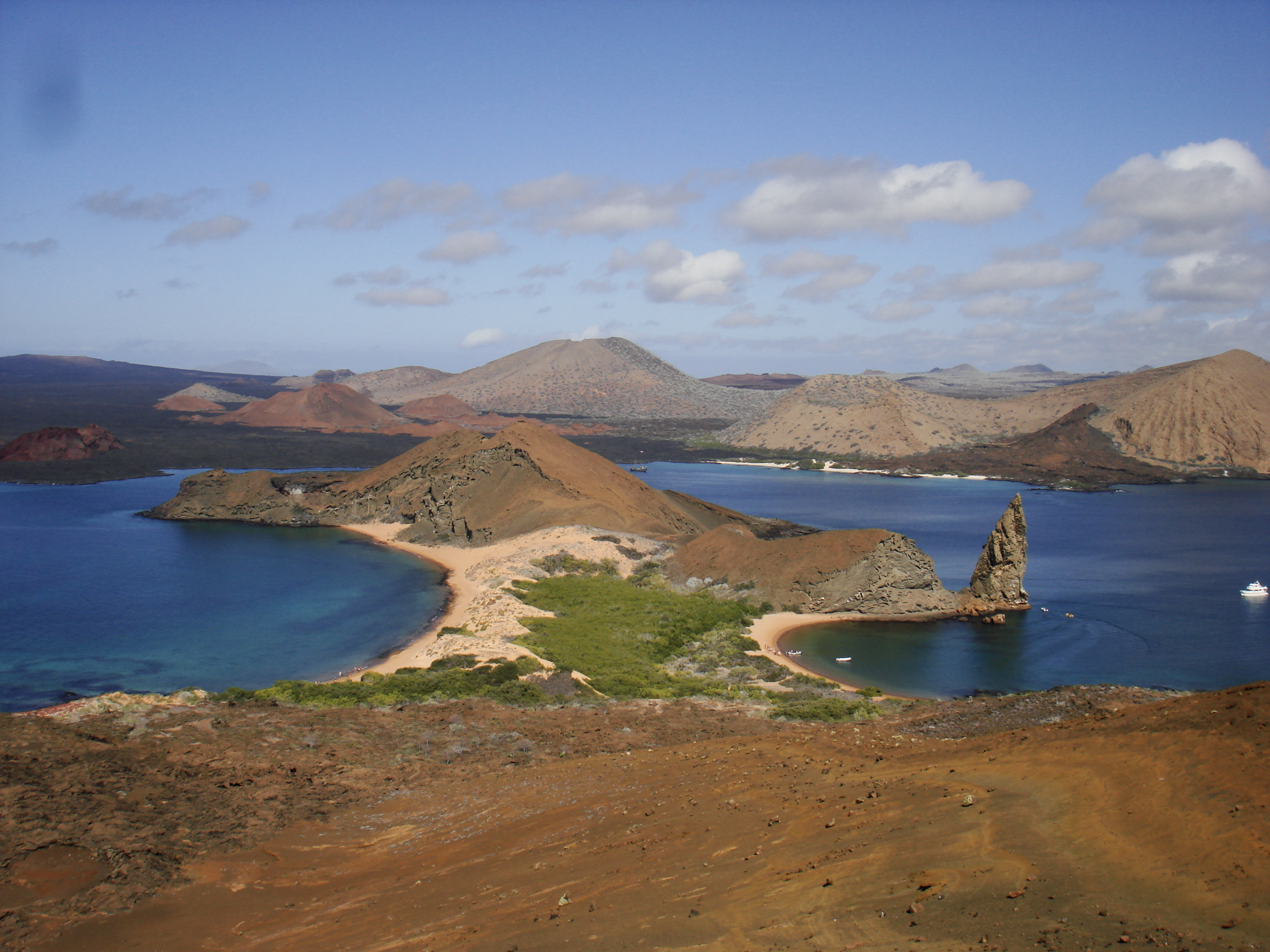
View from Bartolomé Island

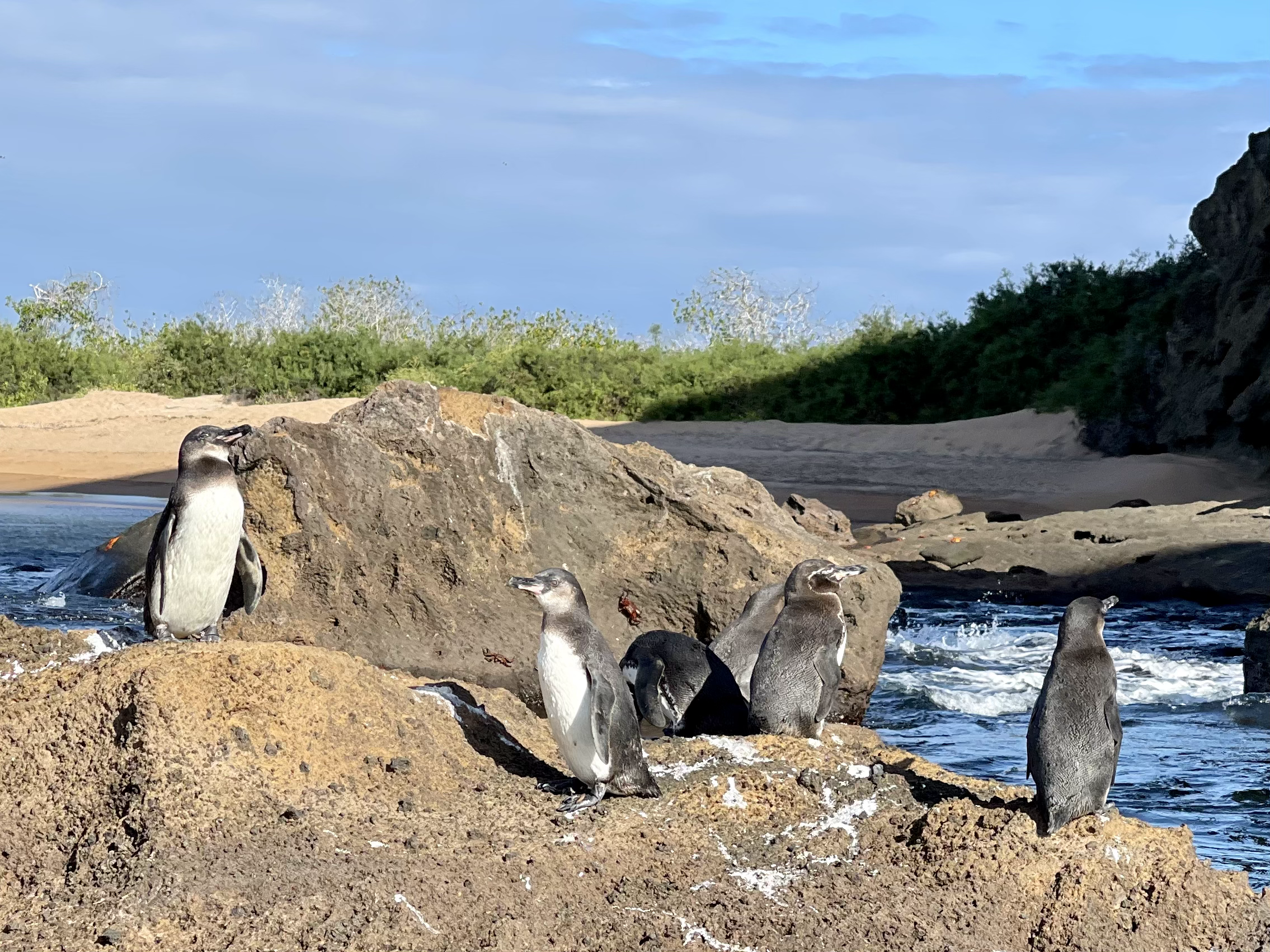
Galápagos Penguins on Bartolomé Island

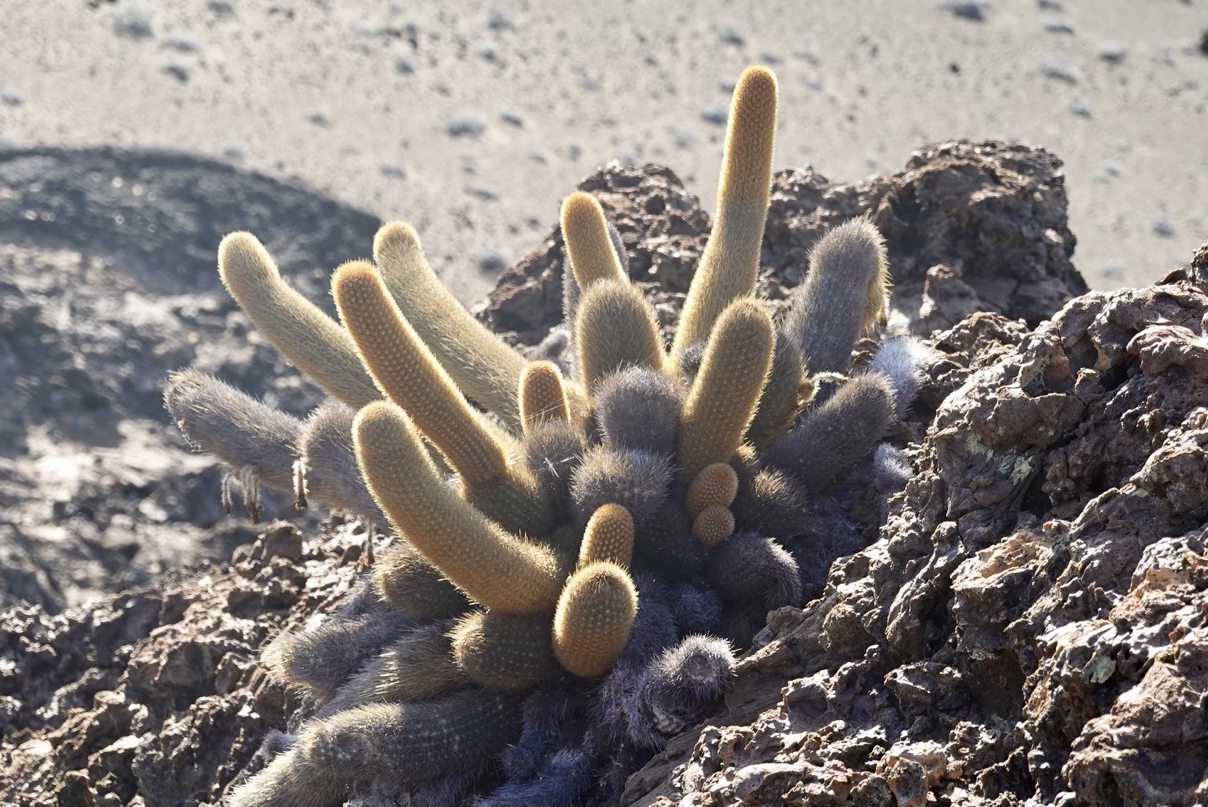
Lava Cactus on the Island

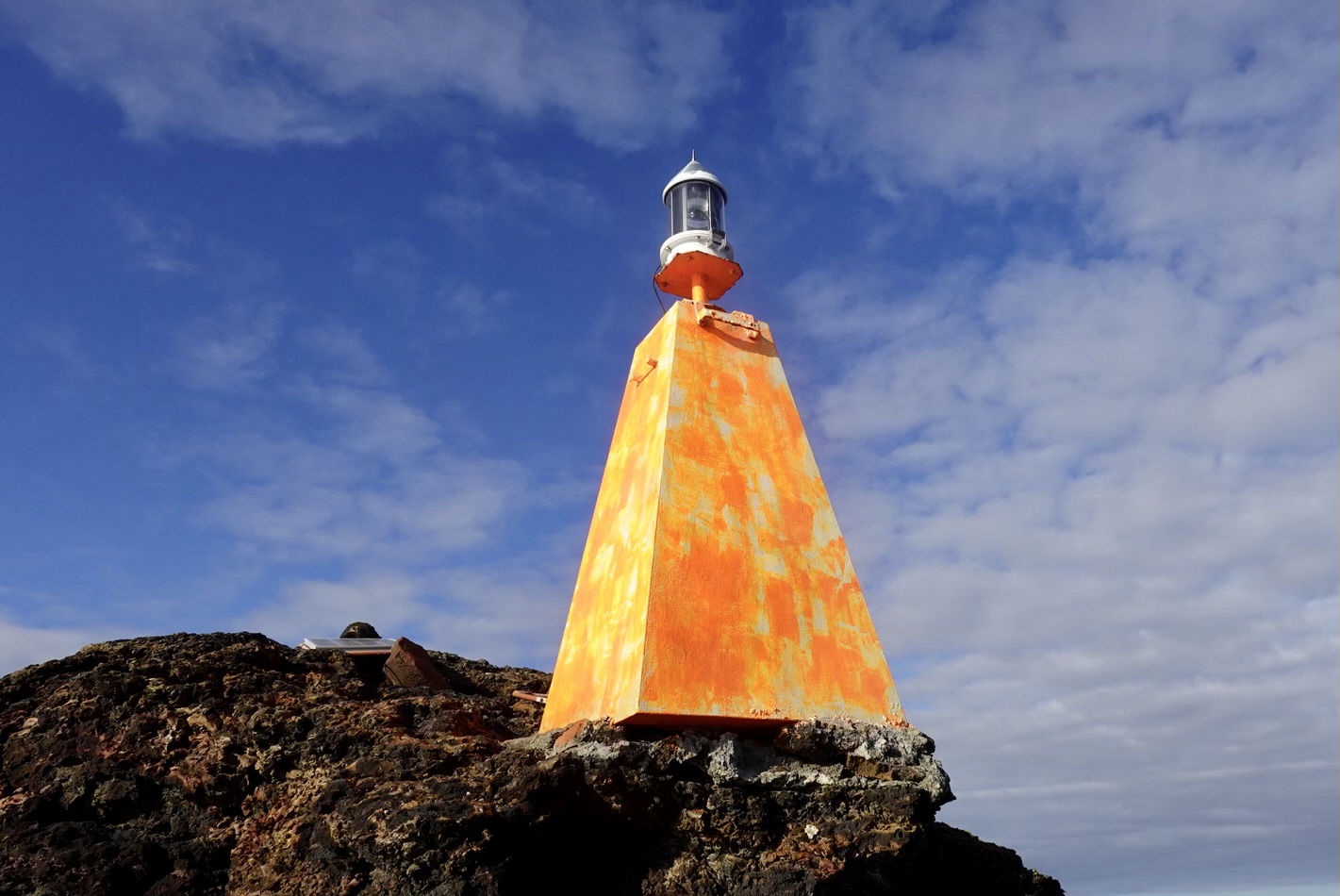
Small Orange Lighthouse at the Summit of Bartolomé Island
