= Xerophyte =

Plant that is adapted to a hot dry environment

A xerophyte (from Ancient Greek ξηρός (xērós) 'dry' and φυτόν (phutón) 'plant') is a species of plant that has adaptations to survive in an environment with little liquid water. Examples of xerophytes include cacti, pineapple and some gymnosperm plants. The morphology and physiology of xerophytes are adapted to conserve water during dry periods. Some species called resurrection plants can survive long periods of extreme dryness or desiccation of their tissues, during which their metabolic activity may effectively shut down. Plants with such morphological and physiological adaptations are said to be xeromorphic. Xerophytes such as cacti are capable of withstanding extended periods of dry conditions as they have deep-spreading roots and capacity to store water. Their waxy, thorny leaves prevent loss of moisture.

== Introduction ==
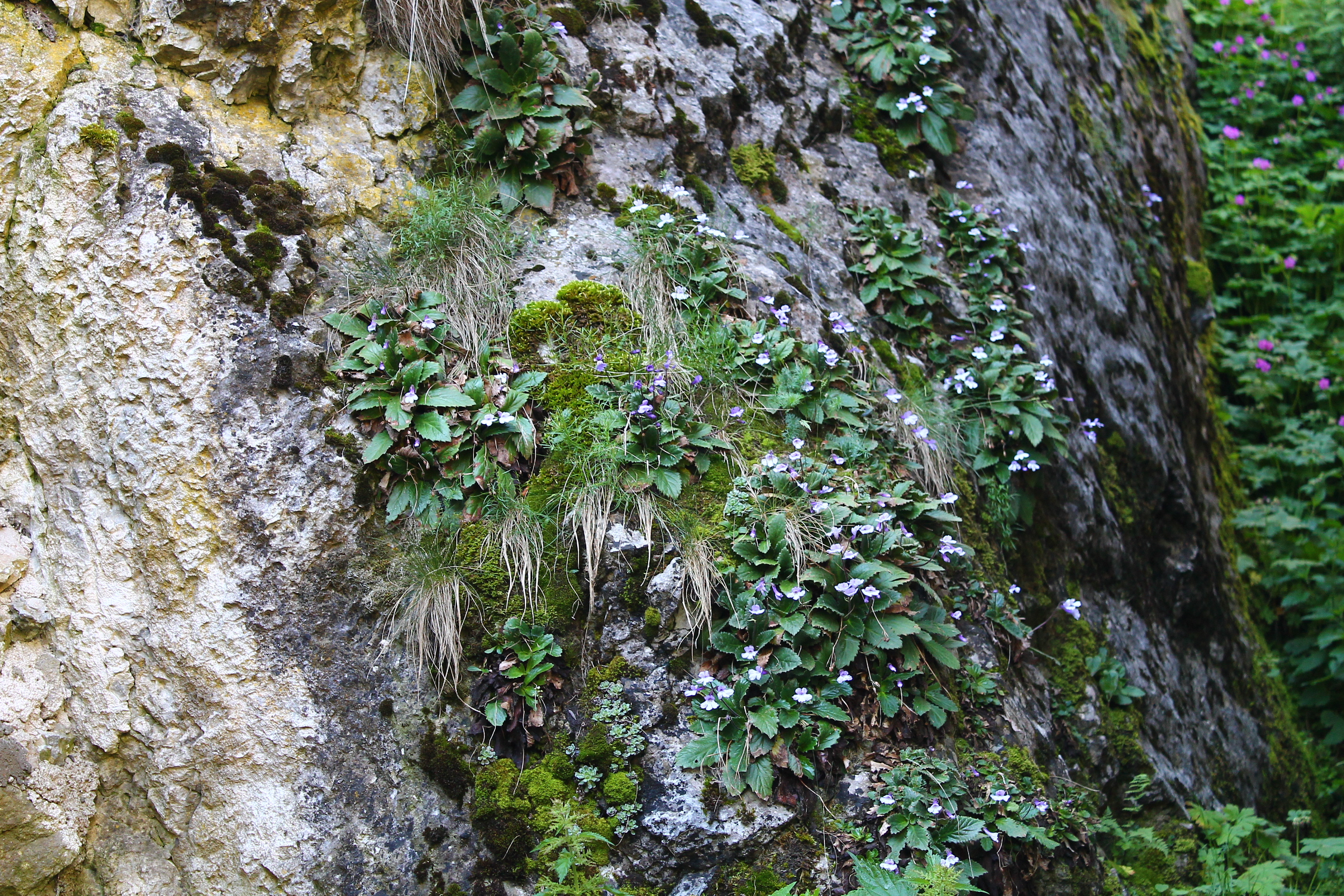
Haberlea rhodopensis

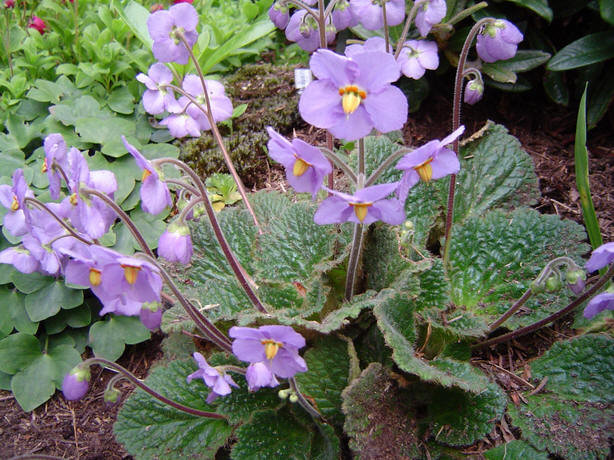
Ramonda serbica a.k.a. Serbian phoenix flower

The structural adaptations of these two resurrection plants are very similar. They can be found on the grounds of Bulgaria and Greece.

Plants absorb water from the soil, which then evaporates from their shoots and leaves; this process is known as transpiration. If placed in a dry environment, a typical mesophytic plant would evaporate water faster than the rate of water uptake from the soil, leading to wilting and even death.

Xerophytic plants exhibit a diversity of specialized adaptations to survive in such water-limiting conditions. They may use water from their own storage, allocate water specifically to sites of new tissue growth, or lose less water to the atmosphere and so channel a greater proportion of water from the soil to photosynthesis and growth. Different plant species possess different qualities and mechanisms to manage water supply, enabling them to survive.

Cacti and other succulents are commonly found in deserts, where there is little rainfall. Other xerophytes, such as certain bromeliads, can survive through both extremely wet and extremely dry periods and can be found in seasonally-moist habitats such as tropical forests, exploiting niches where water supplies are too intermittent for mesophytic plants to survive. Likewise, chaparral plants are adapted to Mediterranean climates, which have wet winters and dry summers.

Plants that live under arctic conditions also have a need for xerophytic adaptations, since water is unavailable for uptake when the ground is frozen, such as the European resurrection plants Haberlea rhodopensis and Ramonda serbica.

In environments with very high salinity, such as mangrove swamps and semi-deserts, water uptake by plants is a challenge due to the high salt ion levels. Such environments may cause an excess of ions to accumulate in the cells, which is very damaging. Halophytes and xerophytes evolved to survive in such environments. Some xerophytes may also be considered halophytes; however, halophytes are not necessarily xerophytes. The succulent xerophyte Zygophyllum xanthoxylum, for example, has specialised protein transporters in its cells which allows storage of excess ions in their vacuoles to maintain normal cytosolic pH and ionic composition.

There are many factors which affect water availability, which is the major limiting factor of seed germination, seedling survival, and plant growth. These factors include infrequent raining, intense sunlight and very warm weather leading to faster water evaporation. An extreme environmental pH and high salt content of water also disrupt plants' water uptake.

== Types ==
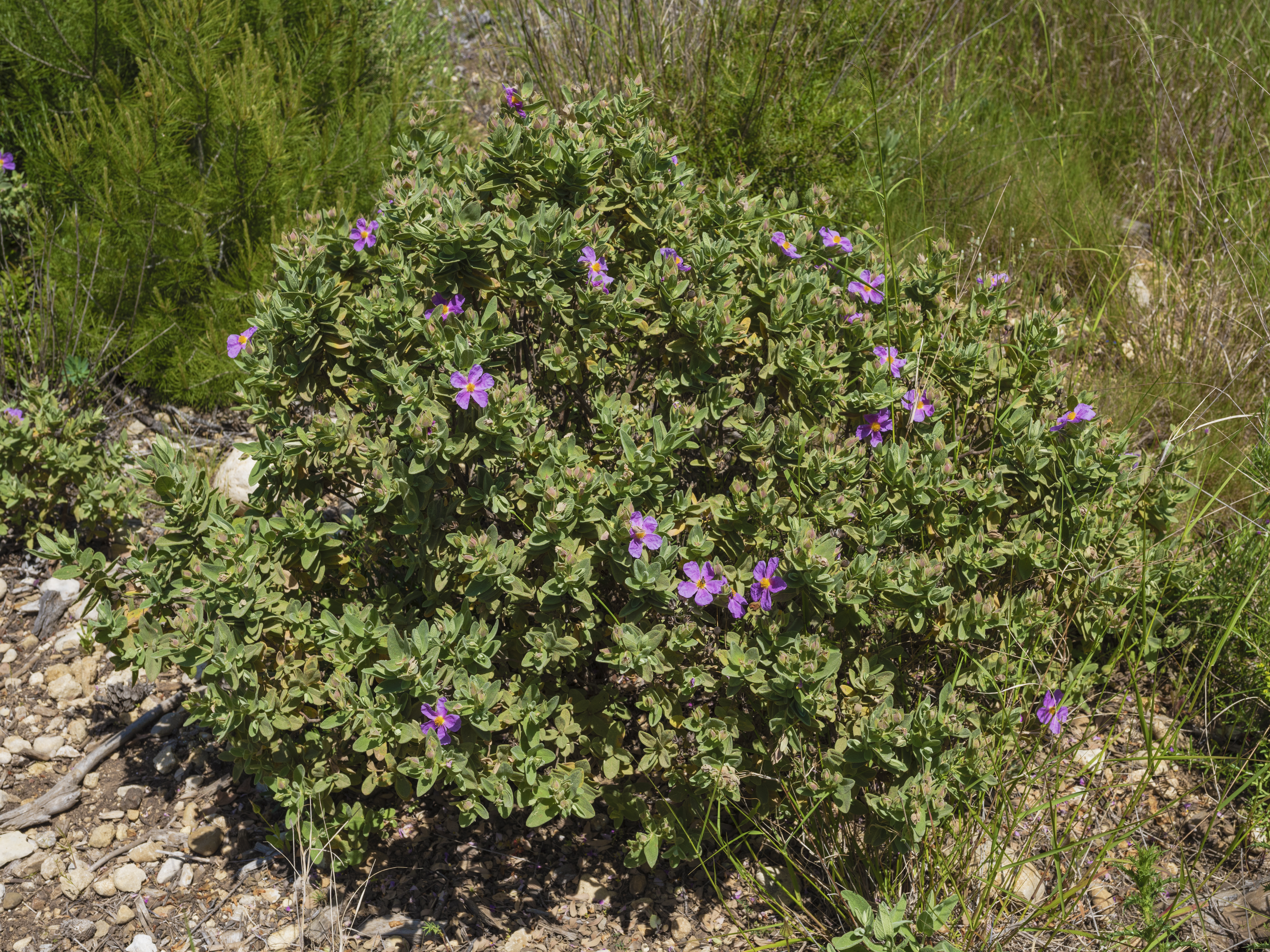
Cistus albidus is a xerophyte which grows in European countries such as France, and Italy and North African countries like Morocco.

Succulent plants store water in their stems or leaves. These include plants from the family Cactaceae, which have round stems and can store a lot of water. The leaves are often vestigial, as in the case of cacti, wherein the leaves are reduced to spines, or they do not have leaves at all. These include the C4 perennial woody plant, Haloxylon ammodendron which is a native of northwest China.

Non-succulent perennials successfully endure long and continuous shortage of water in the soil. These are hence called 'true xerophytes' or euxerophytes. Water deficiency usually reaches 60–70% of their fresh weight, as a result of which the growth process of the whole plant is hindered during cell elongation. The plants which survive drought are, understandably, small and weak.

Ephemerals are the 'drought escaping' kind, and not true xerophytes. They do not really endure drought, only escape it. With the onset of rainfall, the plant seeds germinate, quickly grow to maturity, flower, and set seed, i.e., the entire life cycle is completed before the soil dries out again. Most of these plants are small, roundish, dense shrubs represented by species of Papilionaceae, some inconspicuous Compositae, a few Zygophyllaceae and some grasses. Water is stored in the bulbs of some plants, or at below ground level. They may be dormant during drought conditions and are, therefore, known as drought evaders.

Shrubs which grow in arid and semi-arid regions are also xeromorphic. For example, Caragana korshinskii, Artemisia sphaerocephala, and Hedysarum scoparium are shrubs potent in the semi-arid regions of the northwest China desert. These psammophile shrubs are not only edible to grazing animals in the area, they also play a vital role in the stabilisation of desert sand dunes.

Bushes, also called semi-shrubs often occur in sandy desert region, mostly in deep sandy soils at the edges of the dunes. One example is the Reaumuria soongorica, a perennial resurrection semi-shrub. Compared to other dominant arid xerophytes, an adult R. soongorica, bush has a strong resistance to water scarcity, hence, it is considered a super-xerophytes.

== Importance of water conservation ==
If the water potential (or strictly, water vapour potential) inside a leaf is higher than outside, the water vapour will diffuse out of the leaf down this gradient. This loss of water vapour from the leaves is called transpiration, and the water vapour diffuses through the open stomata. Transpiration is natural and inevitable for plants; a significant amount of water is lost through this process. However, it is vital that plants living in dry conditions are adapted so as to decrease the size of the open stomata, lower the rate of transpiration, and consequently reduce water loss to the environment. Without sufficient water, plant cells lose turgor, This is known as plasmolysis. If the plant loses too much water, it will pass its permanent wilting point, and die.

In brief, the rate of transpiration is governed by the number of stomata, stomatal aperture i.e. the size of the stoma opening, leaf area (allowing for more stomata), temperature differential, the relative humidity, the presence of wind or air movement, the light intensity, and the presence of a waxy cuticle. Whilst it is vital to keep stomata closed, they have to be opened for gaseous exchange in respiration and photosynthesis.

== Morphological adaptations ==
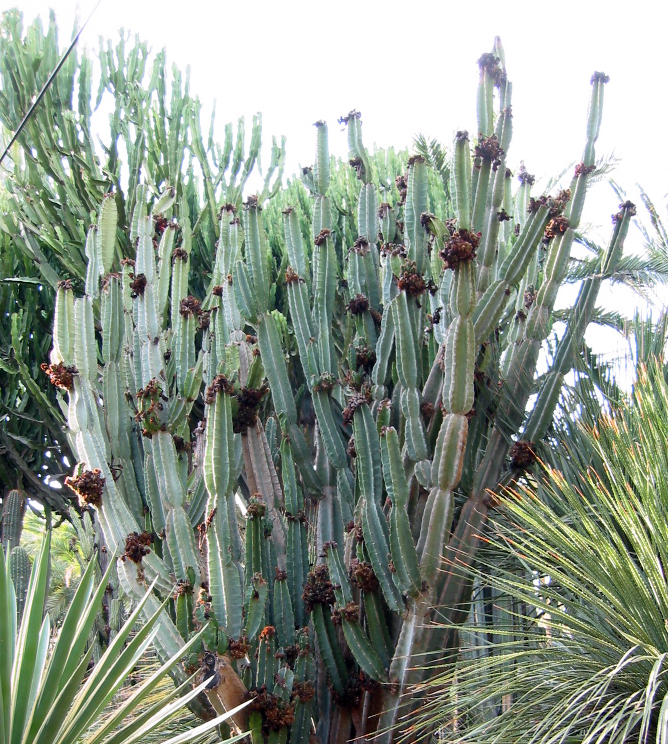
Cereus peruvianus

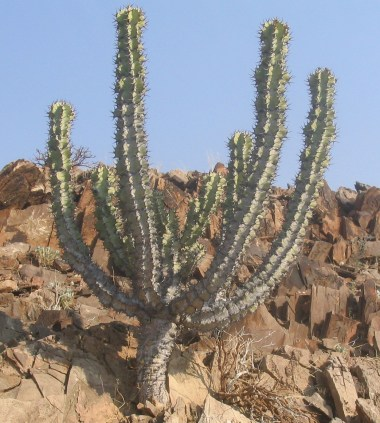
Euphorbia virosa

The cactus Cereus peruvianus looks superficially very similar to Euphorbia virosa due to convergent evolution.

Xerophytic plants may have similar shapes, forms, and structures and look very similar, even if the plants are not very closely related, through a process called convergent evolution. For example, some species of cacti, which evolved only in the Americas, may appear similar to euphorbias, which are distributed worldwide. An unrelated species of caudiciforms plants with swollen bases that are used to store water, may also display some similarities.

Under conditions of water scarcity, the seeds of different xerophytic plants behave differently, which means that they have different rates of germination since water availability is a major limiting factor. These dissimilarities are due to natural selection and eco-adaptation as the seeds and plants of each species evolve to suit their surrounding.

=== Reduction of surface area ===
Xerophytic plants typically have less surface to volume ratio than other plants, so as to minimize water loss by transpiration and evaporation. They can may have fewer and smaller leaves or fewer branches than other plants. An example of leaf surface reduction is the spines of a cactus, while the effects of compaction and reduction of branching can be seen in the barrel cacti. Other xerophytes may have their leaves compacted at the base, as in a basal rosette, which may be smaller than the plant's flower. This adaptation is exhibited by some Agave and Eriogonum species, which can be found growing near Death Valley.

=== Forming water vapour-rich environment ===
Some xerophytes have tiny hair on their surfaces to provide a wind break and reduce air flow, thereby reducing the rate of evaporation. When a plant surface is covered with tiny hair, it is called tomentose. Stomata is located in these hair or in pits to reduce their exposure to wind. This enables them to maintain a humid environment around them.

In a still, windless environment, the areas under the leaves or spines where transpiration takes place form a small localised environment that is more saturated with water vapour than normal. If this concentration of water vapour is maintained, the external water vapour potential gradient near the stomata is reduced, thus, reducing transpiration. In a windier situation, this localisation is blown away and so the external water vapour gradient remains low, which makes the loss of water vapour from plant stomata easier. Spines and hair trap a layer of moisture and slows air movement over tissues.

=== Reflective features ===
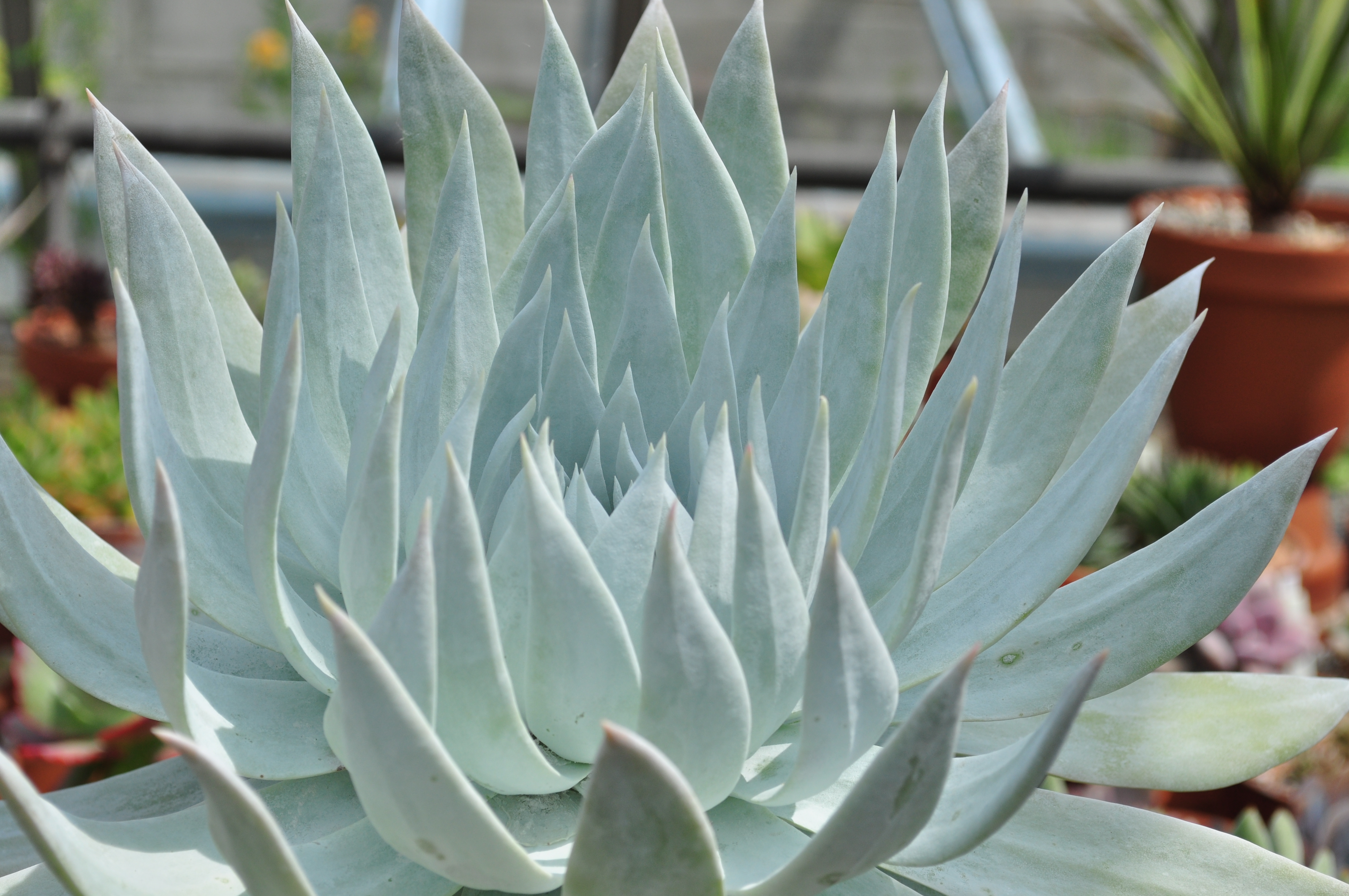
The succulent leaves of Dudleya brittonii are visibly coated with a 'powdery' white which is the epicuticular wax.

The color of a plant, or of the waxes or hair on its surface, may serve to reflect sunlight and reduce transpiration. An example is the white chalky epicuticular wax coating of Dudleya brittonii, which has the highest ultraviolet light (UV) reflectivity of any known naturally occurring biological substance.

=== Cuticles ===
Many xerophytic species have thick cuticles. Just like human skin, a plant's cuticles are the first line of defense for its aerial parts. As mentioned above, the cuticle contains wax for protection against biotic and abiotic factors. The ultrastructure of the cuticles varies in different species. Some examples are Antizoma miersiana, Hermannia disermifolia and Galenia africana which are xerophytes from the same region in Namaqualand, but have different cuticle ultrastructures.

A. miersiana has thick cuticle as expected to be found on xerophytes, but H. disermifolia and G. africana have thin cuticles. Since resources are scarce in arid regions, there is selection for plants having thin and efficient cuticles to limit the nutritional and energy costs for the cuticle construction.

In periods of severe water stress and stomata closure, the cuticle's low water permeability is considered one of the most vital factors in ensuring the survival of the plant. The rate of transpiration of the cuticles of xerophytes is 25 times lower than that of stomatal transpiration. To give an idea of how low this is, the rate of transpiration of the cuticles of mesophytes is only 2 to 5 times lower than stomatal transpiration.

== Physiological adaptations ==
There are many changes that happen on the molecular level when a plant experiences stress. When in heat shock, for example, their protein molecule structures become unstable, unfold, or reconfigure to become less efficient. Membrane stability will decrease in plastids, which is why photosynthesis is the first process to be affected by heat stress. Despite the many stresses, xerophytes have the ability to survive and thrive in drought conditions due to their physiological and biochemical specialties.

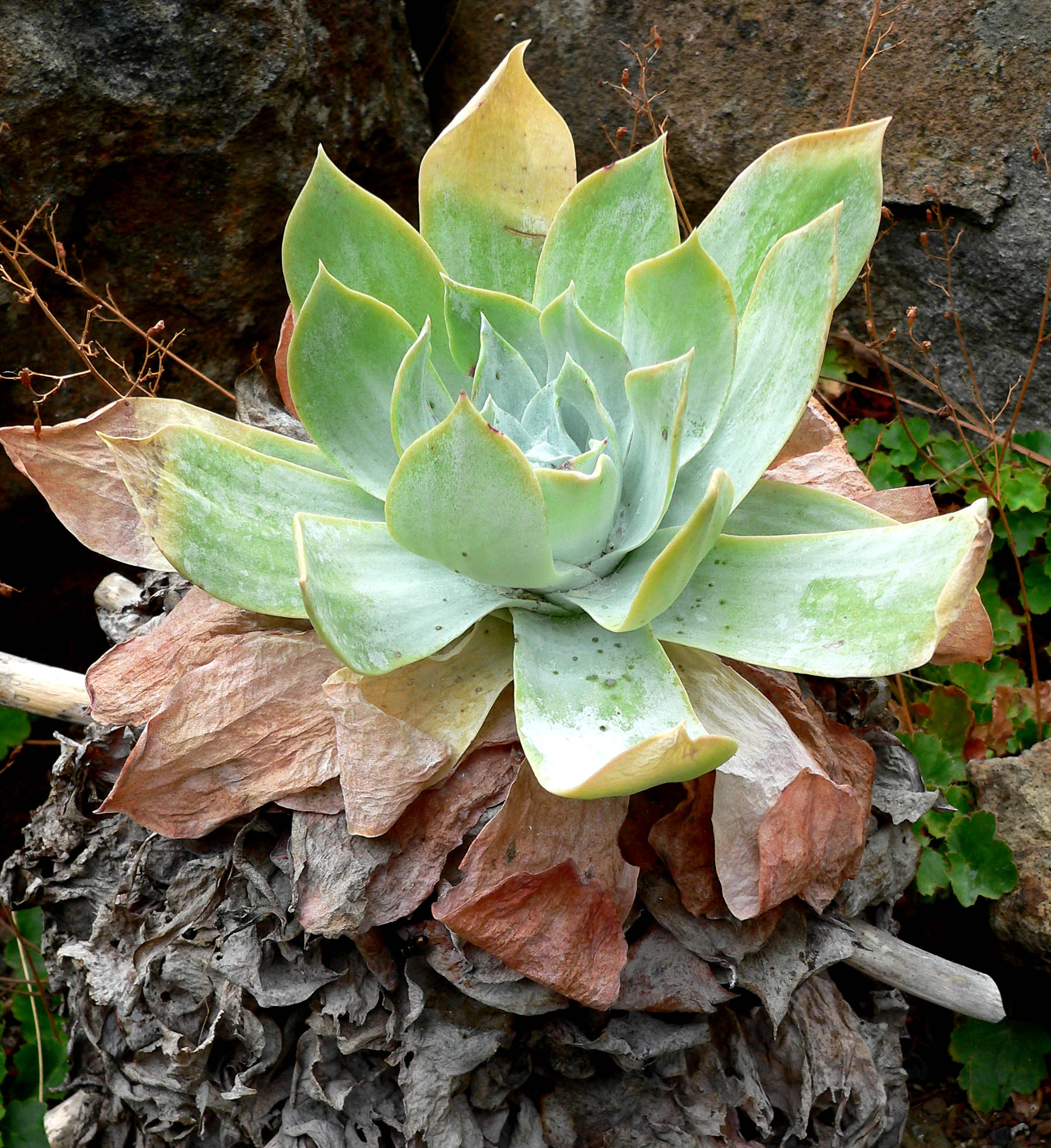
Dudleya pulverulenta is called 'chalk lettuce' for its obvious structures. This xerophyte has fleshy succulent leaves and is coated with chalky wax.

=== Water storage ===
Some plants can store water in their root structures, trunk structures, stems, and leaves. Water storage in swollen parts of the plant is known as succulence. A swollen trunk or root at the ground level of a plant is called a caudex and plants with swollen bases are called caudiciforms.

=== Production of protective molecules ===
Plants may secrete resins and waxes (epicuticular wax) on their surfaces, which reduce transpiration. Examples are the heavily scented and flammable resins (volatile organic compounds) of some chaparral plants, such as Malosma laurina, or the chalky wax of Dudleya pulverulenta.

In regions continuously exposed to sunlight, UV rays can cause biochemical damage to plants, and eventually lead to DNA mutations and damages in the long run. When one of the main molecules involved in photosynthesis, photosystem II (PSII) is damaged by UV rays, it induces responses in the plant, leading to the synthesis of protectant molecules such as flavonoids and more wax. Flavonoids are UV-absorbing and act like sunscreen for the plant.

Heat shock proteins (HSPs) are a major class of proteins in plants and animals which are synthesised in cells as a response to heat stress. They help prevent protein unfolding and help re-fold denatured proteins. As temperature increases, the HSP protein expression also increases.

=== Evaporative cooling ===
Evaporative cooling via transpiration can delay the effects of heat stress on the plant. However, transpiration is very expensive if there is water scarcity, so generally this is not a good strategy for the plants to employ.

Line 1 represents typical mesophytic plants and line 2 represents xerophytes. The stomata of xerophytes are nocturnal and have inverted stomatal rhythm.

=== Stomata closure ===
Most plants have the ability to close their stomata at the start of water stress, at least partially, to restrict rates of transpiration. They use signals or hormones sent up from the roots and through the transpiration stream. Since roots are the parts responsible for water searching and uptake, they can detect the condition of dry soil. The signals sent are an early warning system - before the water stress gets too severe, the plant will go into water-economy mode.

As compared to other plants, xerophytes have an inverted stomatal rhythm. During the day and especially during mid-day when the sun is at its peak, most stomata of xerophytes are closed. Not only do more stomata open at night in the presence of mist or dew, the size of stomatal opening or aperture is larger at night compared to during the day. This phenomenon was observed in xeromorphic species of Cactaceae, Crassulaceae, and Liliaceae.

As the epidermis of the plant is covered with water barriers such as lignin and waxy cuticles, the night opening of the stomata is the main channel for water movement for xerophytes in arid conditions. Even when water is not scarce, the xerophytes A. americana and pineapple plant are found to utilise water more efficiently than mesophytes.

=== Phospholipid saturation ===
The plasma membrane of cells are made up of lipid molecules called phospholipids. These lipids become more fluid when temperature increases. Saturated lipids are more rigid than unsaturated ones i.e. unsaturated lipids becomes fluid more easily than saturated lipids. Plant cells undergo biochemical changes to change their plasma membrane composition to have more saturated lipids to sustain membrane integrity for longer in hot weather.

If the membrane integrity is compromised, there will be no effective barrier between the internal cell environment and the outside. Not only does this mean the plant cells are susceptible to disease-causing bacteria and mechanical attacks by herbivores, the cell could not perform its normal processes to continue living - the cells and thus the whole plant will die.

=== Xanthophyll cycle ===
Light stress can be tolerated by dissipating excess energy as heat through the xanthophyll cycle. Violaxanthin and zeaxanthin are carotenoid molecules within the chloroplasts called xanthophylls. Under normal conditions, violaxanthin channels light to photosynthesis. However, high light levels promote the reversible conversion of violaxanthin to zeaxanthin. These two molecules are photo-protective molecules.

Under high light, it is unfavourable to channel extra light into photosynthesis because excessive light may cause damage to the plant proteins. Zeaxanthin dissociates light-channelling from the photosynthesis reaction - light energy in the form of photons will not be transmitted into the photosynthetic pathway anymore.

=== CAM mechanism ===
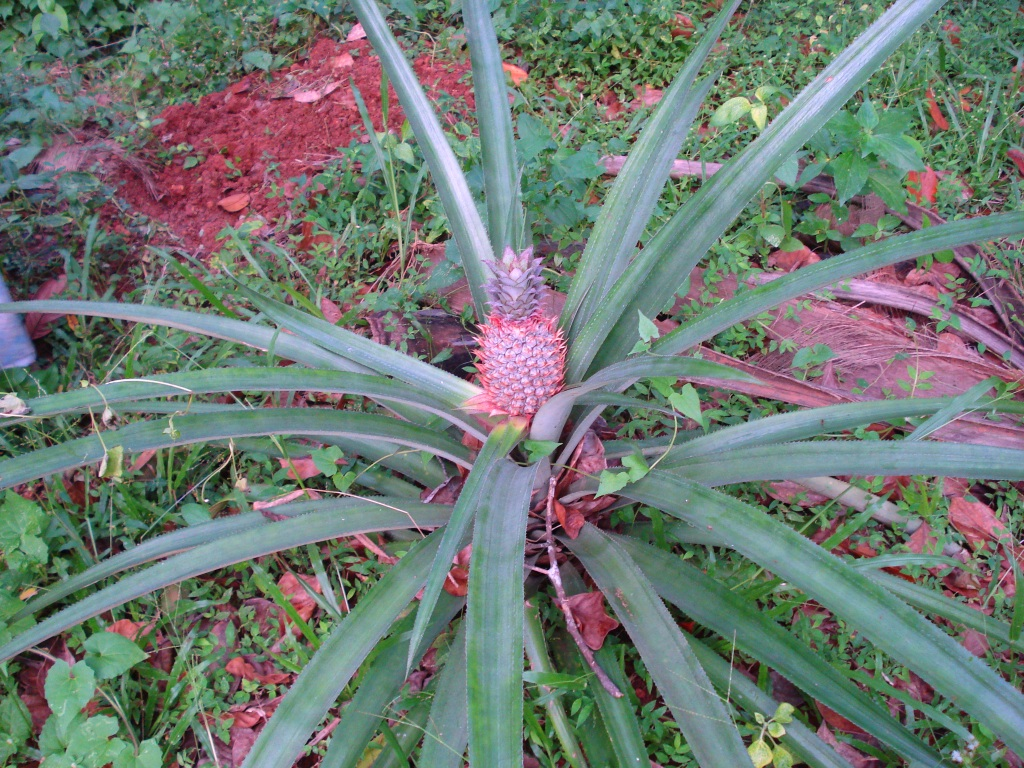
Pineapple plant

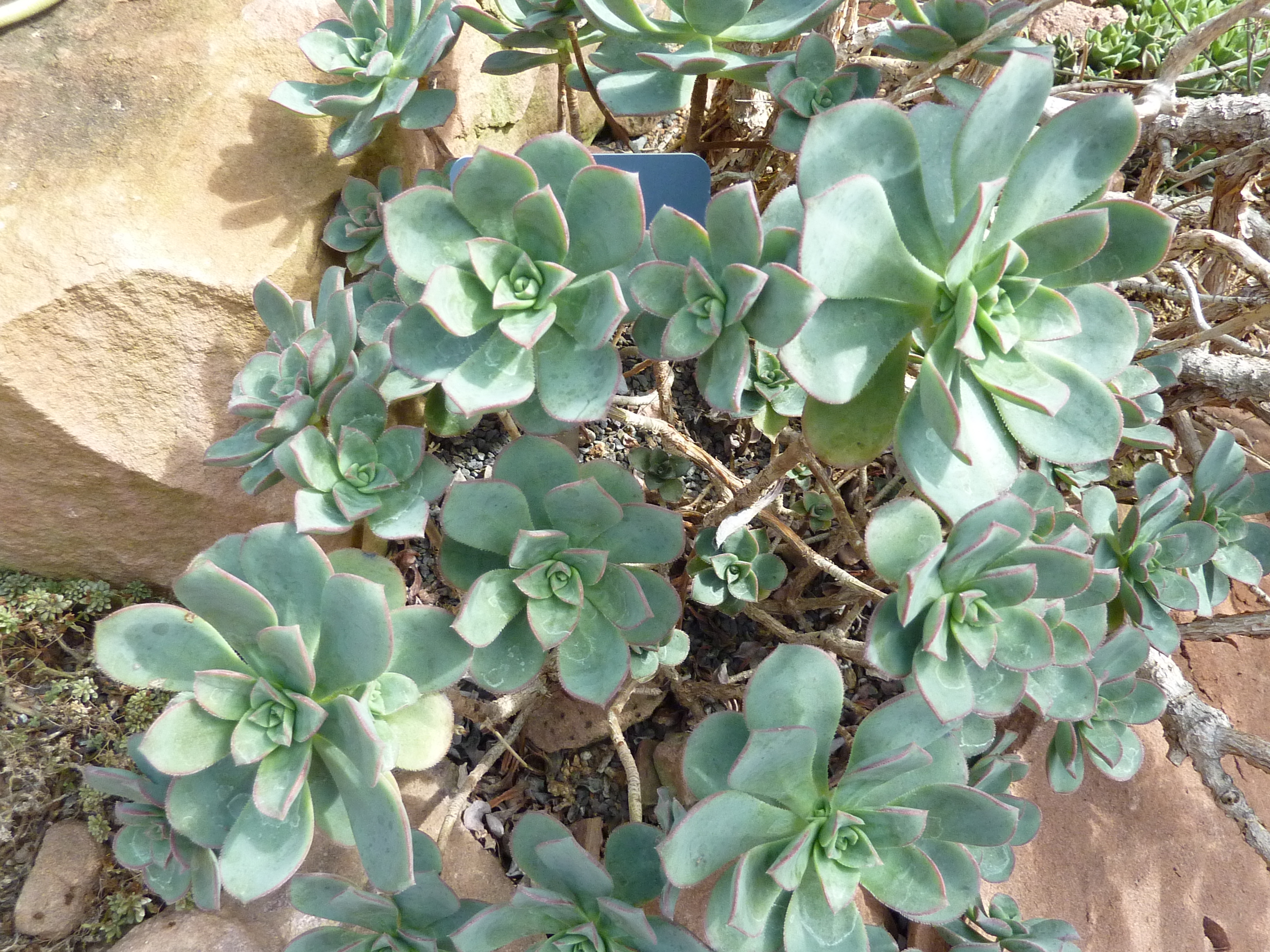
Aeonium haworthii a.k.a. Haworth's pinwheel

Plants utilising the CAM photosynthetic pathway are generally small and non-woody.

Stomata closure not only restricts the movement of water out of the plant, another consequence of the phenomenon is that carbon dioxide influx or intake into the plant is also reduced. As photosynthesis requires carbon dioxide as a substrate to produce sugar for growth, it is vital that the plant has a very efficient photosynthesis system which maximises the utilisation of the little carbon dioxide the plant gets.

Many succulent xerophytes employ the Crassulacean acid metabolism or better known as CAM photosynthesis. It is also dubbed the "dark" carboxylation mechanism because plants in arid regions collect carbon dioxide at night when the stomata open, and store the gases to be used for photosynthesis in the presence of light during the day. Although most xerophytes are quite small, this mechanism allows a positive carbon balance in the plants to sustain life and growth. Prime examples of plants employing the CAM mechanism are the pineapple, Agave americana, and Aeonium haworthii.

Although some xerophytes perform photosynthesis using this mechanism, the majority of plants in arid regions still employ the C_{3} and C_{4} photosynthesis pathways. A small proportion of desert plants even use a collaborated C_{3}-CAM pathway.

=== Delayed germination and growth ===
The surrounding humidity and moisture right before and during seed germination play an important role in the germination regulation in arid conditions. An evolutionary strategy employed by desert xerophytes is to reduce the rate of seed germination. By slowing the shoot growth, less water is consumed for growth and transpiration. Thus, the seed and plant can utilise the water available from short-lived rainfall for a much longer time compared to mesophytic plants.

=== Resurrection plants and seeds ===
A Rose of Jericho plant in dormancy re-flourishes when its roots are placed in a bowl of water.

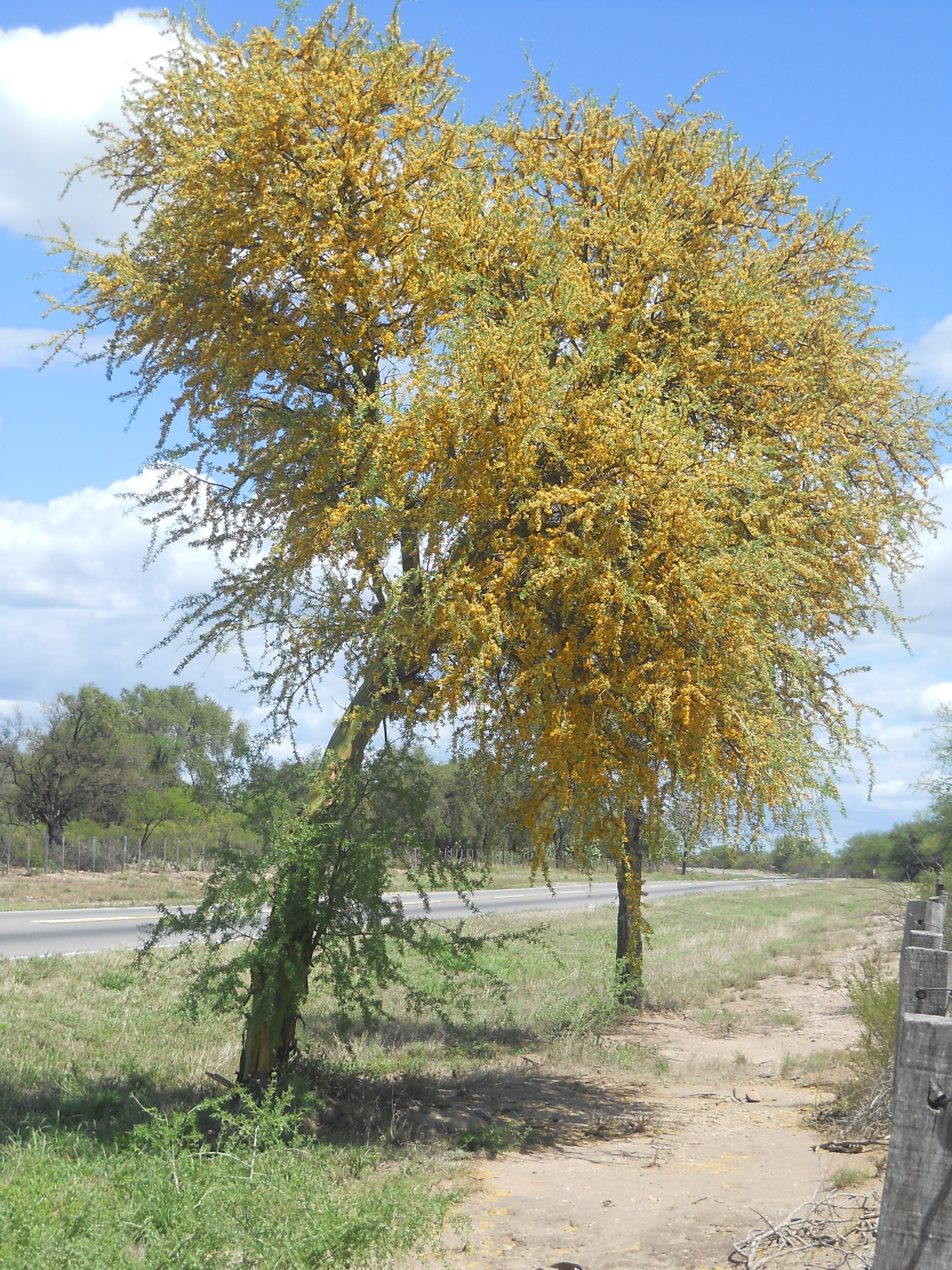
A Geoffroea decorticans tree is both a winter and drought deciduous tree.

During dry times, resurrection plants look dead, but are actually alive. Some xerophytic plants may stop growing and go dormant, or change the allocation of the products of photosynthesis from growing new leaves to the roots. These plants evolved to be able to coordinately switch off their photosynthetic mechanism without destroying the molecules involved in photosynthesis. When water is available again, these plants would "resurrect from the dead" and resume photosynthesis, even after they had lost more than 80% of their water content. A study has found that the sugar levels in resurrection plants increase when subjected to desiccation. This may be associated with how they survive without sugar production via photosynthesis for a relatively long duration. Some examples of resurrection plants include the Anastatica hierochuntica plant or more commonly known as the Rose of Jericho, as well as one of the most robust plant species in East Africa, Craterostigma pumilum. Seeds may be modified to require an excessive amount of water before germinating, so as to ensure a sufficient water supply for the seedling's survival. An example of this is the California poppy, whose seeds lie dormant during drought and then germinate, grow, flower, and form seeds within four weeks of rainfall.

=== Leaf wilting and abscission ===
If the water supply is not enough despite the employment of other water-saving strategies, the leaves will start to collapse and wilt due to water evaporation still exceeding water supply. Leaf loss (abscission) will be activated in more severe stress conditions. Drought deciduous plants may drop their leaves in times of dryness.

The wilting of leaves is a reversible process, however, abscission is irreversible. Shedding leaves is not favourable to plants because when water is available again, they would have to spend resources to produces new leaves which are needed for photosynthesis. Exceptions exist, however, such as the ocotillo which will shed its leaves during prolonged dry seasons in the desert, then re-leaf when conditions have improved.

== Modification of environment ==
The leaf litter on the ground around a plant can provide an evaporative barrier to prevent water loss. A plant's root mass itself may also hold organic material that retains water, as in the case of the arrowweed (Pluchea sericea).

== Mechanism table ==
| Mechanism | Adaptation | Examples |
|---|---|---|
| Water uptake | Extensive root system | Acacia, Prosopis |
| Water storage | Succulence | Kalanchoe, Euphorbia |
| Water storage | Fleshy tuber | Raphionacme |
| Reduce water loss | Surface area reduction | Barrel cactus, Basal rosette, Eriogonum compositum |
| Reduce water loss | Sunken stomata and hairs | Pine, Nassauvia falklandica, Bromeliads |
| Reduce water loss | Waxy leaf surface | Prickly pear, Malosma laurina, Dudleya pulverulenta |
| Reduce water loss | Nocturnal stomata | Tea plant, Alfalfa, Brachychiton discolor, Quercus trojana |
| Reduce water loss | CAM photosynthesis | Cactus, Pineapple plant, Agave americana, Aeonium haworthii, Sansevieria trifasciata |
| Reduce water loss | Curled leaves | Esparto grass |
| Dormancy and reduced photosynthesis | Resurrection plants | Ramonda nathaliae, Ramonda myconi, Haberlea rhodopensis, Anastatica, Craterostigma pumilum |
| Dormancy and reduced photosynthesis | Dormant seeds | Californian poppy |
| Dormancy and reduced photosynthesis | Leaf abscission | Coastal sage scrub, Wiliwili, Geoffroea decorticans |

== Uses ==
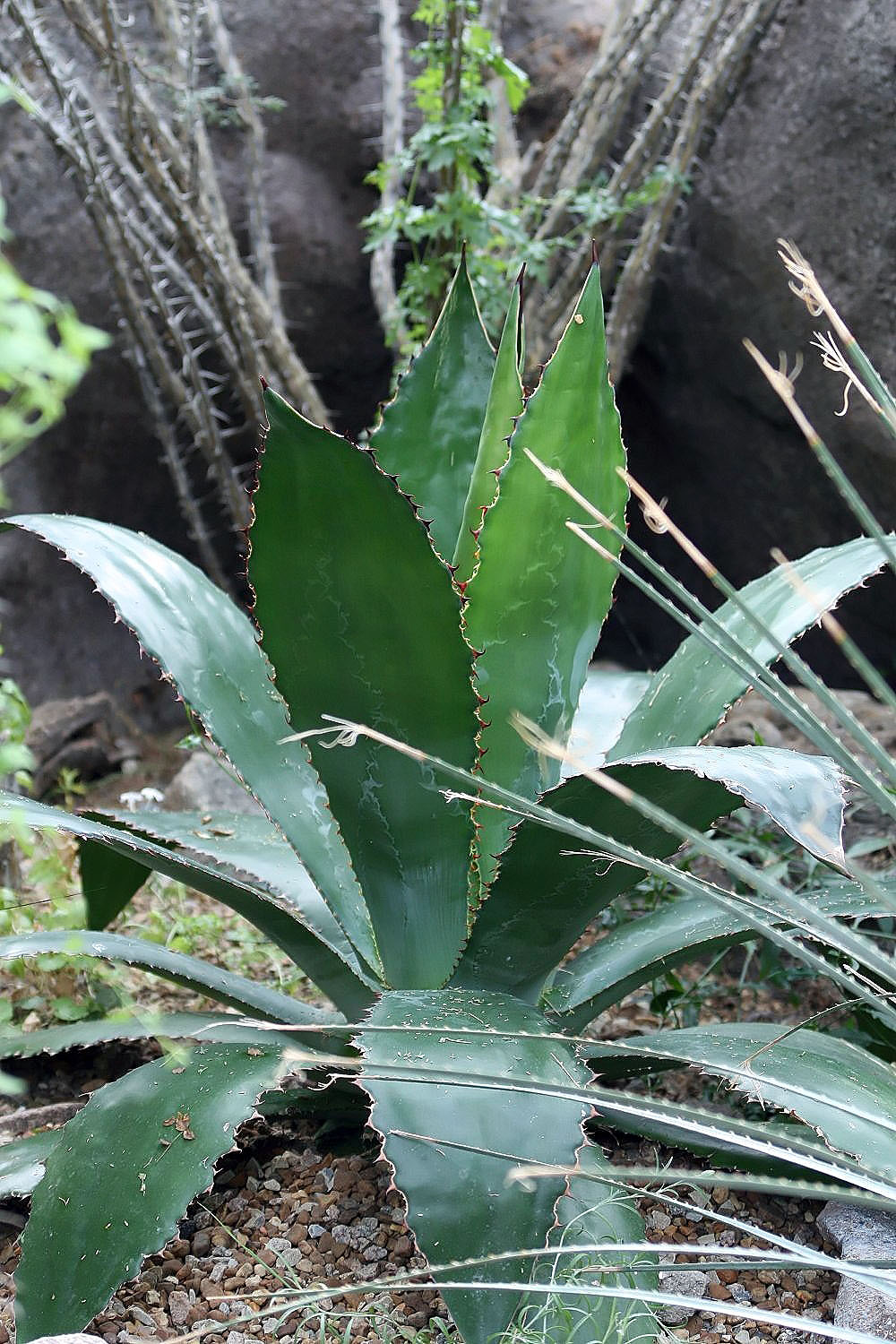
Agave americana is a versatile xerophyte. All parts of the plant can be used either for aesthetics, for consumption, or in traditional medicine.

Land degradation is a major threat to many countries such as China and Uzbekistan. The major impacts include the loss of soil productivity and stability, as well as the loss of biodiversity due to reduced vegetation consumed by animals. In arid regions where water is scarce and temperatures are high, mesophytes will not be able to survive, due to the many stresses. Xerophytic plants are used widely to prevent desertification and for fixation of sand dunes. In fact, in northwest China, the seeds of three shrub species namely Caragana korshinskii, Artemisia sphaerocephala, and Hedysarum scoparium are dispersed across the region. These shrubs have the additional property of being palatable to grazing animals such as sheep and camels. H. scoparium is under protection in China due to it being a major endangered species. Haloxylon ammodendron and Zygophyllum xanthoxylum are also plants that form fixed dunes.

A more well-known xerophyte is the succulent plant Agave americana. It is cultivated as an ornamental plant popular across the globe. Agave nectar is garnered from the plant and is consumed as a substitute for sugar or honey. In Mexico, the plant's sap is usually fermented to produce an alcoholic beverage.

Many xerophytic plants produce colourful vibrant flowers and are used for decoration and ornamental purposes in gardens and in homes. Although they have adaptations to live in stressful weather and conditions, these plants thrive when well-watered and in tropical temperatures. Phlox sibirica is rarely seen in cultivation and does not flourish in areas without long exposure to sunlight.

A study has shown that xerophytic plants which employ the CAM mechanism can solve micro-climate problems in buildings of humid countries. The CAM photosynthetic pathway absorbs the humidity in small spaces, effectively making the plant such as Sansevieria trifasciata a natural indoor humidity absorber. Not only will this help with cross-ventilation, but lowering the surrounding humidity increases the thermal comfort of people in the room. This is especially important in East Asian countries where both humidity and temperature are high.

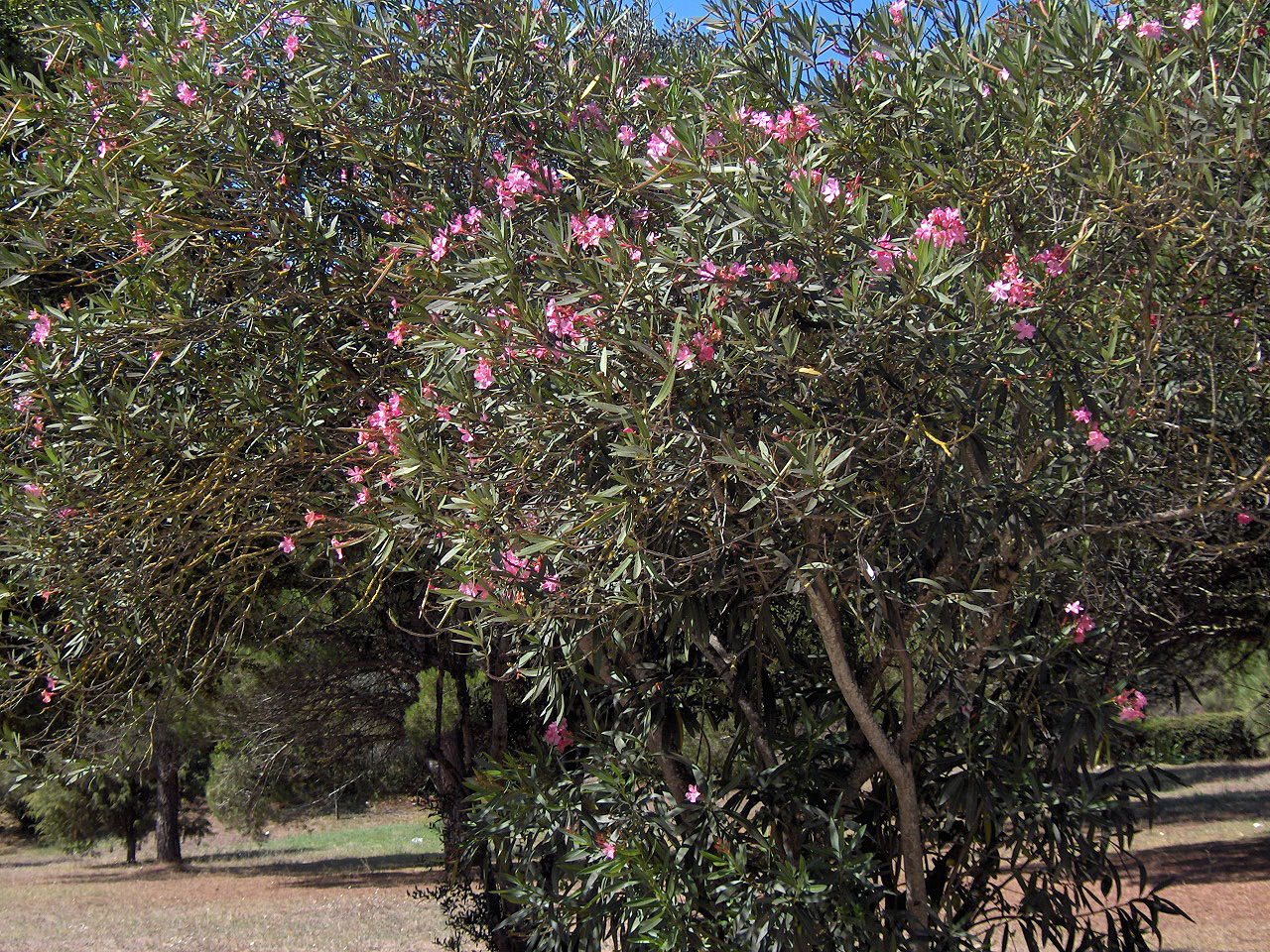
Nerium oleander on the left during autumn and on the right during summer.

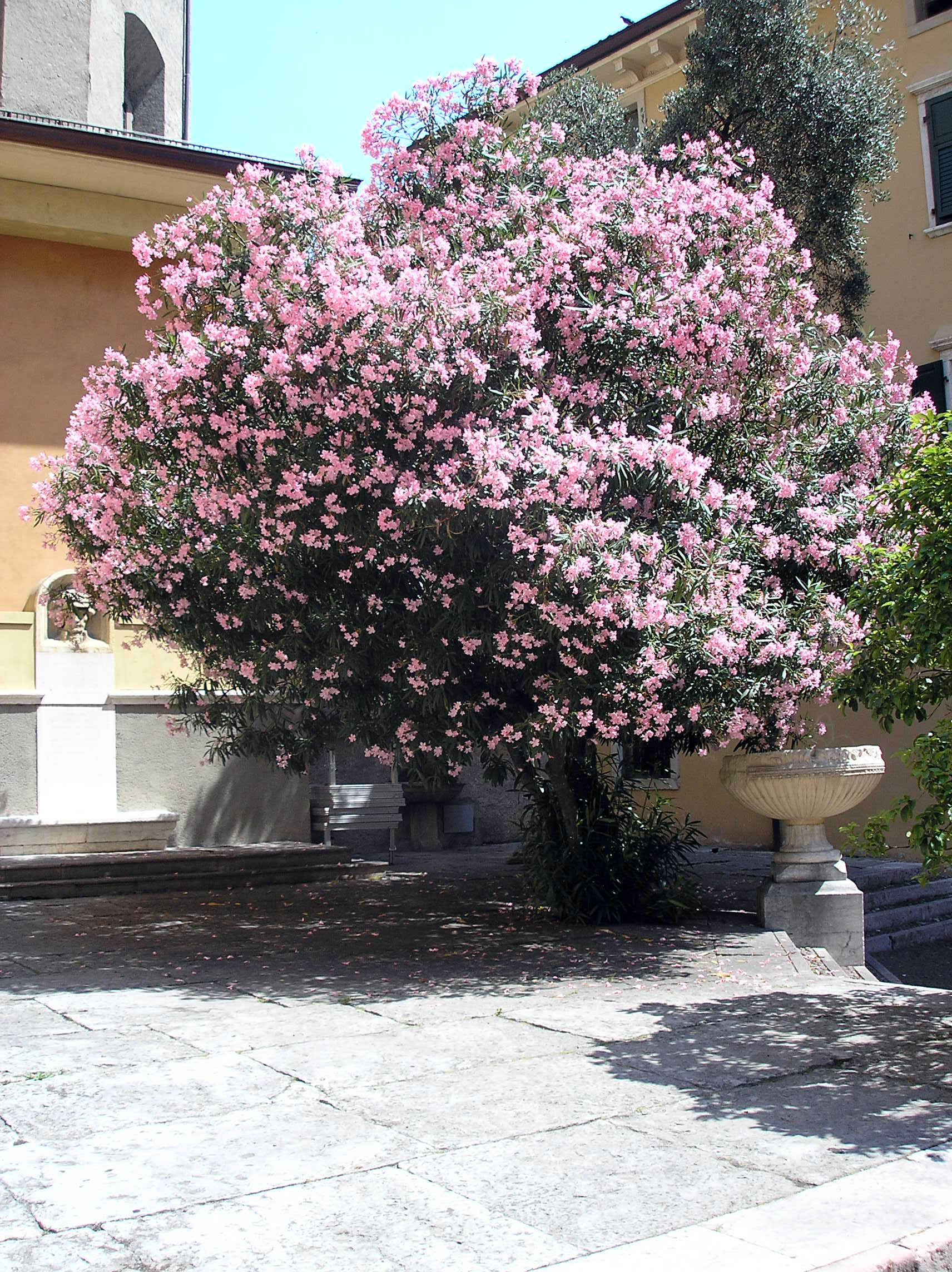

Recent years has seen interests in resurrection plants other than their ability to withstand extreme dryness. The metabolites, sugar alcohols, and sugar acids present in these plants may be applied as natural products for medicinal purposes and in biotechnology. During desiccation, the levels of the sugars sucrose, raffinose, and galactinol increase; they may have a crucial role in protecting the cells against damage caused by reactive oxygen species (ROS) and oxidative stress. Besides having anti-oxidant properties, other compounds extracted from some resurrection plants showed anti-fungal and anti-bacterial properties. A glycoside found in Haberlea rhodopensis called myconoside is extracted and used in cosmetic creams as a source of anti-oxidant as well as to increase elasticity of the human skin. Although there are other molecules in these plants that may be of benefit, it is still much less studied than the primary metabolites mentioned above.

== See also ==
- Index: Desert flora
- Arid Forest Research Institute (AFRI)
- Arizona Cactus Botanical Garden
- Drought tolerance
- Halophyte
- Hydrophyte
- International Center for Agricultural Research in the Dry Areas
- International Crops Research Institute for the Semi-Arid Tropics
- Kinetic Theory
- Ombrophobe
- Phreatophytes
- Raunkiær plant life-form
- Xeriscaping
- Xerocole
