= Louis Ramond de Carbonnières =

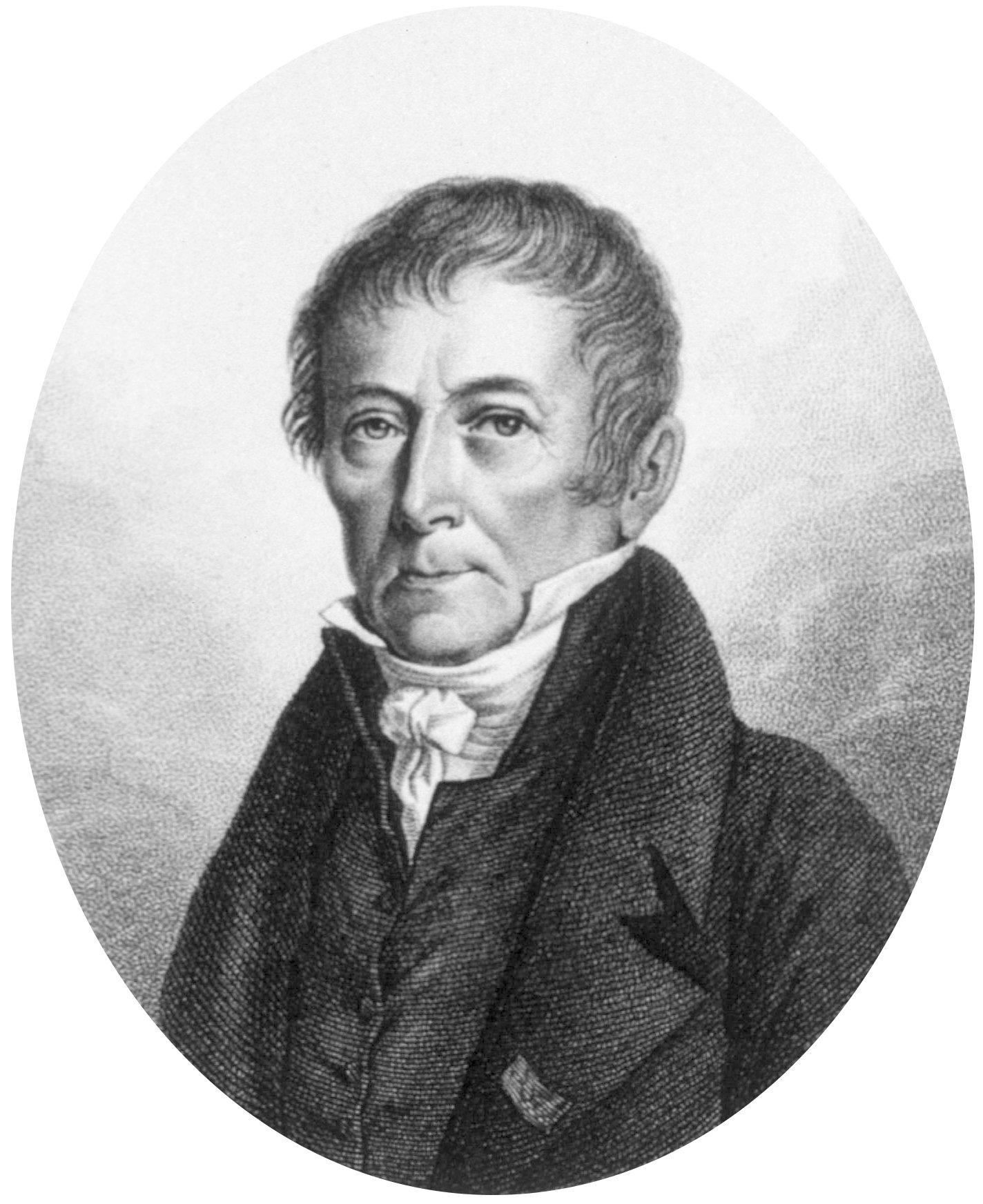
Louis Ramond de Carbonnières

Louis François Élisabeth Ramond, baron de Carbonnières (4 January 1755 Strasbourg – 14 May 1827), was a French politician, geologist and botanist. He is regarded as one of the first explorers of the high mountains of the Pyrenees who can be described as a pyreneist.

== Life ==
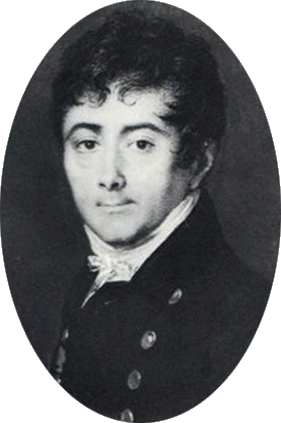
Louis Ramond de Carbonnières

Louis Ramond was born in Strasbourg, to Pierre-Bernard Ramond (1715–1796), treasurer of war, and Rosalie-Reine Eisentrand (1732–1762).

He studied law at the University of Strasbourg in 1775 and became a lawyer in February 1777. In Strasbourg he became friends with another student, Jakob Michael Reinhold Lenz (1751–1792), a writer belonging to the then-fashionable Sturm und Drang movement. During this period, Ramond discovered German Romantic literature, in particular Goethe's The Sorrows of Young Werther; this book inspired him to become a writer, and in 1777 he published the Werther-influenced Les Dernières aventures du jeune d'Olban (The Last Adventures of Young Olban). Ramond undertook a voyage to Switzerland in May 1777 where he met writers and poets, as well as scientists: the theologian Johann Kaspar Lavater (1741–1801), and the zoologists Albrecht von Haller (1708–1777) and Charles Bonnet (1720–1793); he also came across his friend Lenz there. The two men shared what was by all accounts an ecstatic experience contemplating the valley of the Rhine. Ramond also caught the passion for high mountains. A few days later, Lenz suffered his first bout of insanity. In 1778, Ramond published Élégies, impressions inspired by his love for nature. Extracts from this work were published the same year in the Journal de Dames of Claude-Joseph Dorat (1734–1780).

In 1779, Ramond and his father settled in Paris. In 1780, Ramond published La Guerre d'Alsace pendant le Grand Schisme d'Occident (The War of Alsace during the Great Western Schism), a romantic and historical epic. But the French capital was not yet ready for German Romanticism, and the book was not received as well as he had hoped.

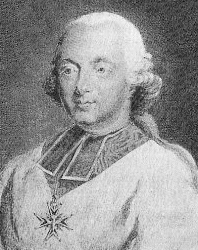
Louis René Édouard de Rohan

Leaving Paris he returned to Strasbourg, where he placed himself at the service of cardinal Louis René Édouard de Rohan (1734–1803), prince of Rohan-Guemenée and cardinal-archbishop of Strasbourg, celebrated for his role in the affair of the diamond necklace. In the company of the prince, Ramond travelled widely and met many of the personalities of the age. The cardinal was sent in exile to La Chaise-Dieu in June 1786, and he left for Auvergne accompanied by his faithful secretary. That summer, the cardinal wished to stay in a thermal town in the Pyrenees and Ramond departed to reconnoitre the area. The two men spent the summer and the autumn of 1787 in Barèges. Ramond started to explore the nearby mountains above Gavarnie and in the Maladetta Massif, to get a better acquaintance with their geological formations – these were the subject of a topical controversy, fed in particular by the limestone theories of Déodat Gratet de Dolomieu (1750–1801) – and to see whether the mountains were granite or limestone, which was believed to be older rock.

When the cardinal was authorized to return to Strasbourg in December 1788, Ramond settled in Paris, where in 1789 he published his Observations faites dans les Pyrénées, pour servir de suite à des observations sur les Alpes (Observations Made in the Pyrenees, To follow some Observations of the Alps). To improve his knowledge of natural history, he followed the courses of Jussieu (1748–1836) and René Desfontaines (1780–1831) in the Jardin des Plantes.

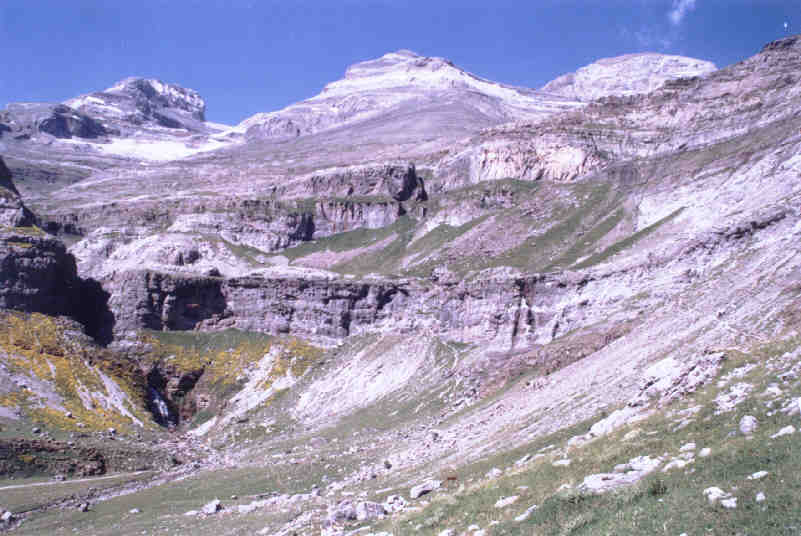
Cilindro de Marboré (3,328 m), Monte Perdido (3,355 m) and Soum de Ramond (3,263 m) (left to right)

He also launched himself into politics, being elected a deputy of Paris in September 1791 and joining the Club des Feuillants. In 1792 he defended the refractory priests whose deportation had been voted for. Ramond passionately supported the action of La Fayette, who tried to temper the over-enthusiasm of the Jacobins. His life in danger, Ramond decided to flee Paris in August and seek refuge in the Pyrenees. Under surveillance and regarded as suspect, he left for Barèges, where he was able to indulge in his botanizing and mountain observations to his heart's content.

He was arrested in 1794 and accused of being an enemy of the Revolution. Imprisoned in Tarbes for seven months, his was a lucky escape from the guillotine.

From 1796, he devoted himself exclusively to natural history. He corresponded with Philippe Picot of Lapeyrouse (1744–1818) and various botanists such as René Desfontaines, Jean Thore (1762–1823) and Domenica Villars (1745–1814). From 1796, he taught as professor of natural history at the new Central School of Tarbes, where his courses were an immediate success, and he soon became a specialist in the botany and geology of the central Pyrenees. In 1797, he was finally able to concentrate on a project which had long intrigued him: to reach the top of Monte Perdido (3,355 m) to counter the theories of Dolomieu and Lapeyrouse on the 'early era' of the limestone of the central chain. The expedition, which comprised about fifteen people, including Picot of Lapeyrouse and several of Ramond's pupils, found many fossils, but did not reach the top. The account of the expedition appeared in 1797 under the title of Voyage au Mont-Perdu et dans la partie adjacente des Hautes-Pyrénées (Voyage to Monte Perdido and the neighbouring parts of the High Pyrenees). On 7 September the same year, again accompanied by his pupils and Charles-François Brisseau de Mirbel (1776–1854), Ramond made a second attempt. The administrator and forester Étienne-François Dralet (1760–1844) also took part in the expedition. But it was only in 1802 that he finally reached the top. Ramond reported this ascent in the Journal de Mines (in Thermidor year XI). He corresponded in particular with René Just Haüy (1743–1822), Alexandre Brongniart (1770–1847) and Jean Florimond Boudon de Saint-Mercy (1748–1831).

After the Central School of Tarbes closed, he returned to Paris in 1800 as a member of the Constitutional Council. From 1800 to 1806, he worked with the Parliament, as well as taking part in the work of the Société des observateurs de l'homme and becoming a member of the French Academy of Sciences in January 1802. He married Bonne-Olympe in 1805, widow of General Louis-Nicolas Chérin and the daughter of his friend Bon-Joseph Dacier (1742–1833). As a friend of Napoleon, Ramond was named vice-president of the Corps législatif, then in 1806 he became prefect of Puy-de-Dôme. He spent more time, however, botanizing and making weather measurements than occupying himself with administration. This did not prevent his being made baron d'Empire in December 1809.

In 1815 he published Nivellement des Monts Dorés et des Monts Dômes disposé par ordre de terrains, (Stratification of the Monts Dorés and the Monts Dômes). The same year, he was elected deputy of Puy-de-Dôme. In 1818, he was elected to the Conseil d'État and did not leave Paris again except to go to Auvergne. In 1821, he spent the summer in Auvergne with René Desfontaines and two young naturalists, Victor Jacquemont (1801–1832) and Count Hippolyte Jaubert (1798–1874). He published finally, in 1825, Sur l'état de la végétation au sommet du Pic du Midi, (On the Condition of the Vegetation on the Summit of the Pic du Midi), this being the Pic du Midi de Bigorre, not its more shapely namesake. On his death in 1827, Ramond was buried in the cemetery of Montmartre.

== Commemoration ==
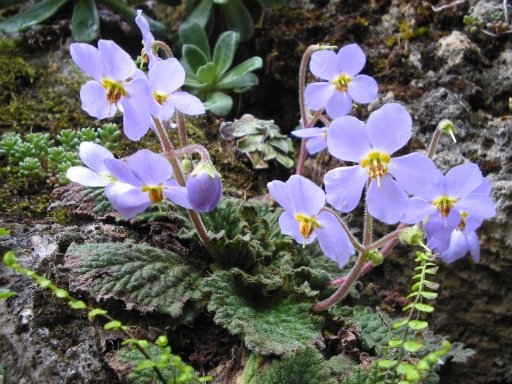
Ramonda pyrenaica

- One endemic Pyrenean species, Ramonda pyrenaica in the family Gesneriaceae – a remnant of the flora of the Tertiary – was dedicated to him by the botanist Jean Michel Claude Richard (1787–1868). It grows between an elevation of 1,200 m and 2,500 m in the cracks of schist rocks. There are three other species in the genus Ramonda, R. heldreichii, R. nathaliae and R. serbica, all of which are found in the Balkans; the genus is the one of a very small number in the Gesneriaceae found outside the tropics or the sub-tropics.
- The Soum de Ramond (3,263 m) (known in Spanish as Pico Añisclo) in the Monte Perdido massif is named after him. (See photograph above left.)
- His name is also given to Pic Ramougn (3,011 m), a steep, rocky peak in the Néouvielle Massif. Ramougn is the pronunciation of Ramond in the Gascon language.
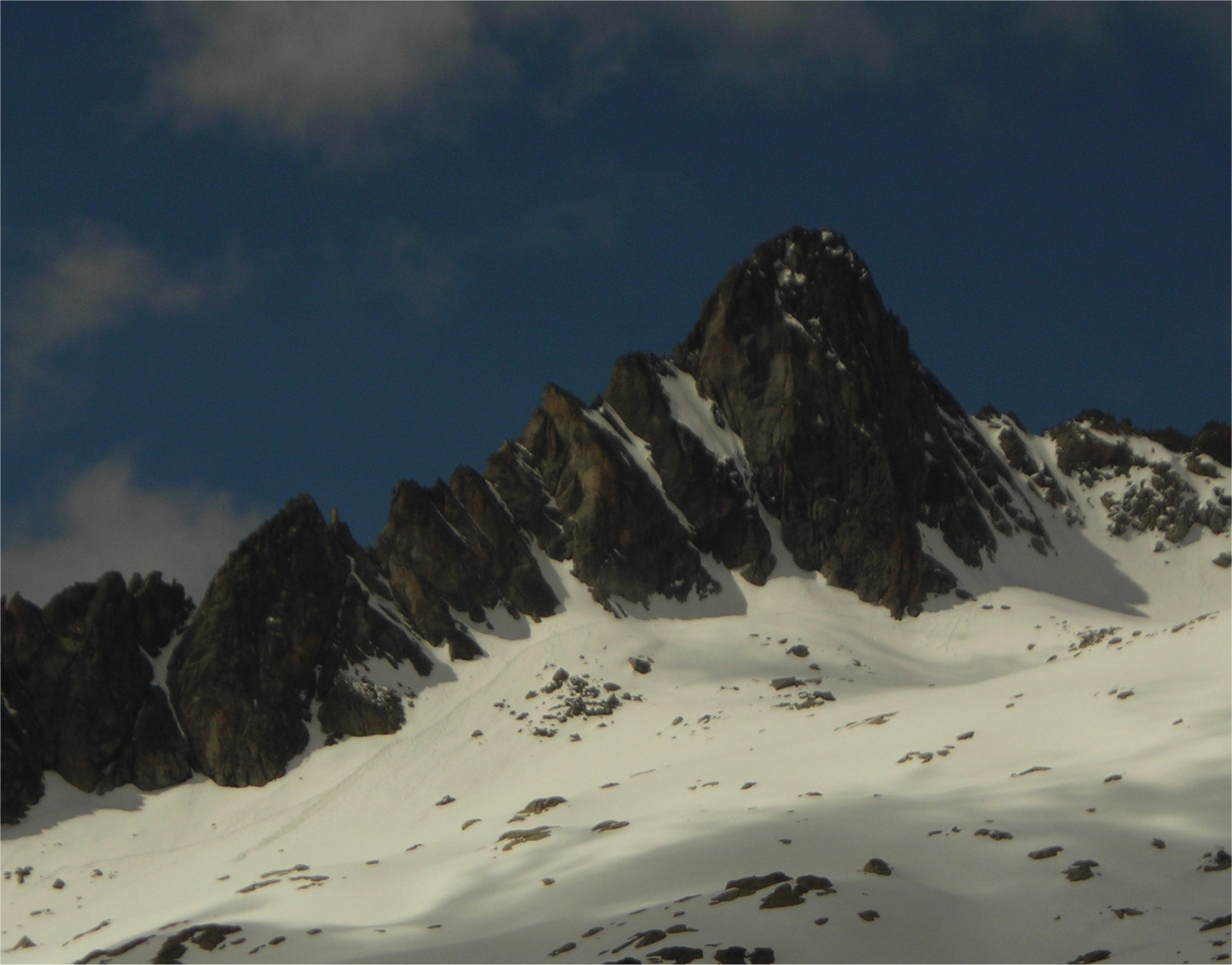
  Northern flanks of Pic Ramougn
- Bory de Saint Vincent gave Ramond's name to a chain of craters (Puy Ramond) on the Piton de la Fournaise in Réunion: they are regularly visited by walkers on the GR route which crosses Réunion from north to south, and by the thousands of runners who take part in the Diagonale des Fous each year.
- The Société Ramond (Ramond Society) was formed in 1865 in Bagnères-de-Bigorre, by Henry Russell (1834–1909), Émilien Frossard (1829–1898), Charles Packe (1826–1896) and Farnham Maxwell-Lyte. It wanted to distinguish itself from traditional academic societies, while still being devoted primarily to the scientific and ethnographic study of the Pyrenees and to the dissemination of knowledge. Ramond, who had excelled in these disciplines, was the best symbol for the new society. The Ramond Society still publishes an annual bulletin.
- Ramond's herbarium can be seen at the Muséum de l'histoire naturelle in Bagnères-de-Bigorre.

== Works ==
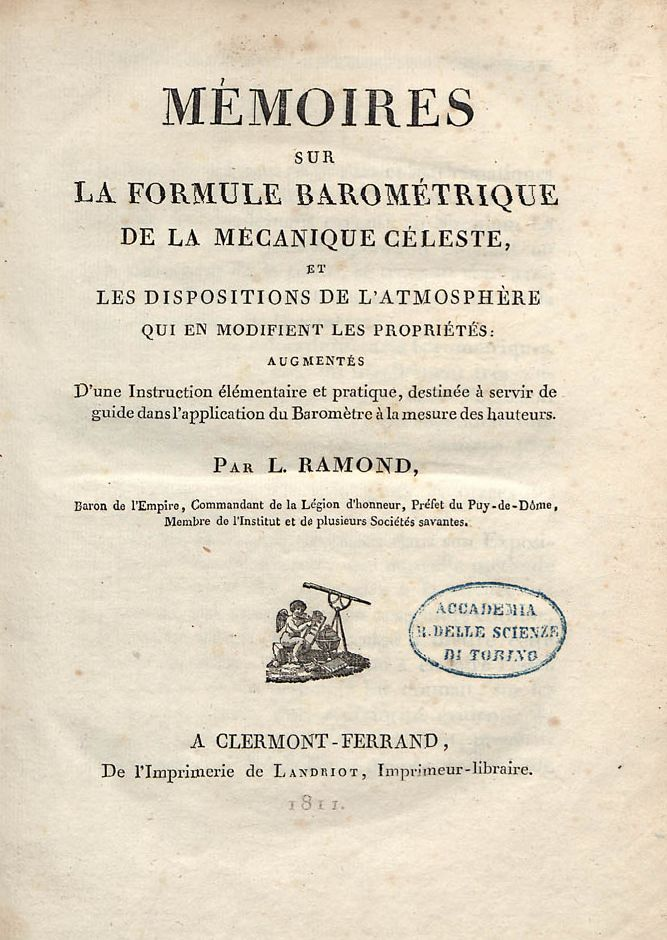
Mémoires sur la formule barometrique de la mecanique celeste, et les dispositions de l'atmosphere qui en modifient les proprietes, 1811

- Mémoires sur la formule barometrique de la mecanique celeste, et les dispositions de l'atmosphere qui en modifient les proprietes (in French). Clermont-Ferrand: Pierre Landriot. 1811.

== Bibliography ==
- Benoît Dayrat, Les Botanistes et la Flore de France, trois siècles de découvertes, 2003, Publication scientifiques du Muséum national d'histoire naturelle, 690 pp.
- Henri Béraldi, Cent ans aux Pyrénées, Paris, 1898–1904, seven volumes in octavo. Reissued by Les Amis du Livre Pyrénéen, Pau, 1977, then by the Librairie des Pyrénées et de Gascogne, Pau, 2001.
- Albert Escolà Massagué, Ramond de Carbonnières. El águila de los Pirineos, Editorial Pirineo, Huesca, 2022, 466 pp.
