= Poikilohydry =

Having no mechanism to prevent desiccation

Poikilohydry is the lack of ability (structural or functional mechanism) to maintain and/or regulate water content to achieve homeostasis of cells and tissue connected with quick equilibration of cell/tissue water content to that of the environment. The term is derived from Ancient Greek ποικίλος (poikílos, “spotted or variegate”).

Tolerance to desiccation has been utilized in the Archaea, Bacteria, and Eukaryote kingdoms to take advantage of ecological niches. The tolerance to desiccation is often combined with other abiotic stress factors such as temperature extremes, malnutrition, vitamin imbalances, salinity content, and ultraviolet radiation. Many plants control desiccation tolerance through non-specialized structures such as vegetative tissues or specialized structures such as spores, seeds, and tubers. Desiccation tolerance is distributed among Bryophytes that have no cuticle or stomata, nine Pteridophyte families and ten Angiosperm families, vascular plants that do have a cuticle and stomata.

Selaginella lepidophylla is a vascular lycophyte native to the Chihuahuan Desert in New Mexico, Texas and Mexico. It occurs in north-facing rock crevices and in open habitats. The notable leaf curling attributed to S. lepidophylla, tested by Lebkeucher and Eickmeier in 1991, occurs to prevent photoinhibition in the microphylls in response to UV radiation and gradual leaf uncurling when rehydrated, protects the plant from the same photoinhibition until photon fluxes are fully processed.

Hymenophyllaceae are poikilohydrous ferns that grow in high-humidity, high-shade areas like the rainforests of Trinidad, Venezuela and New Zealand. These ferns face the unique challenges of having a high-resistance for gas exchange and limited water loss. This provided strong selective evolutionary pressure towards individuals that were the most energy efficient. Two major components of efficiency have been focused on by these ferns: reducing wasteful structures and increasing light absorption. Regulating water levels takes energy and it is not critical to survival in these environments, so structures such as the stomata are no longer present in Hymenophyllaceae. Thick mesophyll is inefficient in environments with low-sunlight and makes gas exchange more difficult, so Hymenophyllaceae have adapted thin mesophyll. When removed from their natural habitat, Hymenophyllaceae are vulnerable. Compared to other ferns they are more susceptible to desiccation, which is a tradeoff they had to make to adapt to their environment.

== Physiology during desiccation ==
In order to survive recurrent desiccation events, poikilohydric plants have developed key mechanisms that prevent damage to internal structures. Sucrose, a disaccharide sugar, is found in high concentrations within desiccation tolerant plants. Sucrose is used within cells in order to help maintain the phospholipid bilayer which stabilizes the cell structure and reduces the likelihood of damage during the dehydrating, rehydrating, and reactivation processes.

Two examples of desiccation-resistant plants are Ramonda and Haberlea. To test the changes in sucrose levels, Müller et al. put these species into three scenarios then recorded the percent of sucrose in dry weight. As a control, plants were watered daily for 10 days, in these plants sucrose made up ~2% of the dry weight. When looking at drought stress the plants were either not watered for all 10 days or unwatered for the first 5 days then watered until the end of the experiment. It was found that in the plants left unwatered, their sucrose content made up 5-10% of the dry weight. When the desiccated plants were watered again their sucrose levels dropped back down to control levels, and the plants began to retake their natural color and shape.

The membrane structure in bryophytes is not affected by desiccation, but protein synthesis is strongly affected. It was found that decline in proteins was much greater in drought sensitive plants. Dehydrins and rehydrins are LEA proteins, or proteins involved in protecting plants against drought and other environmental stresses and protecting enzymes and membranes. Rehydrin protein production is activated when rehydration is detected. Abscisic acid has also been found in some mosses and can induce protein synthesis. Another defence mechanism of poikilohydric plants is to stop photosynthesis and accumulate anthocyanin pigments. These pigments reflect sunlight and act as a barrier to protect the chloroplasts from excess light exposure.

Desiccation tolerant plants are categorized by their stress adaptation strategies and their photosynthetic mechanism. Plants are divided into a poikilochlorophyllous desiccation-tolerant (PDT) group and homoiochlorophyllous desiccation-tolerant (HDT) group. PDT plants lose their chlorophyll with desiccation, must rebuild their photosynthetic apparatus, and cannot resurrect new leaves when detached. On the other hand, HDT plants retain their chlorophyll and can resurrect new leaves when detached.
