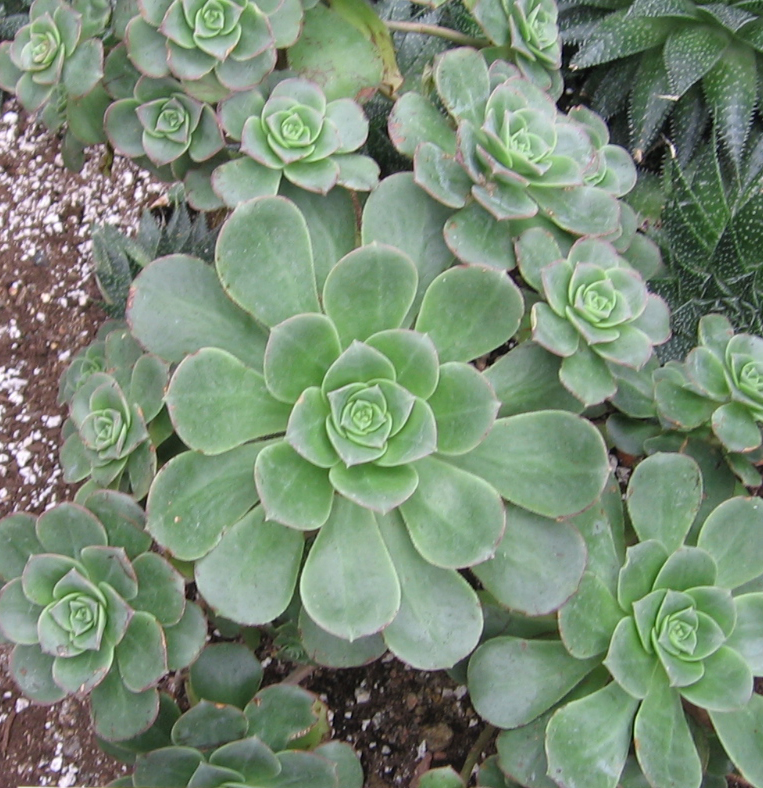

Scientific classification
- Kingdom: Plantae
- Clade: Embryophytes
- Clade: Tracheophytes
- Clade: Angiosperms
- Clade: Eudicots
- Order: Saxifragales
- Family: Crassulaceae
- Genus: Aeonium
- Species: A. haworthii

Binomial name
- Aeonium haworthii Webb & Berthel.

Synonyms
- Sempervivum haworthii (Webb & Berthel.) Salm-Dyck ex Christ

= Aeonium haworthii =

Species of flowering plant

Aeonium haworthii, also known as Haworth's aeonium or pinwheel, is a species of succulent flowering plant in the family Crassulaceae. It is grown as a houseplant in temperate regions. It has gained the Royal Horticultural Society's Award of Garden Merit, as has the cultivar 'Variegatum'.

== Distribution ==
A. haworthii is native to the Canary Islands and northern Africa, but it has been introduced to other areas of similar climate, such as Southern California. In the US, it is suitable to be grown outside in USDA hardiness zones 9–11. This species is drought tolerant and prefers full sun. It is sometimes susceptible to aphids and mealybugs. It is a sand-dwelling beach plant, a subshrub with rough, woody stems and rosettes of thick, red-edged green leaves which are triangular or diamond- or spade-shaped.

== Description ==
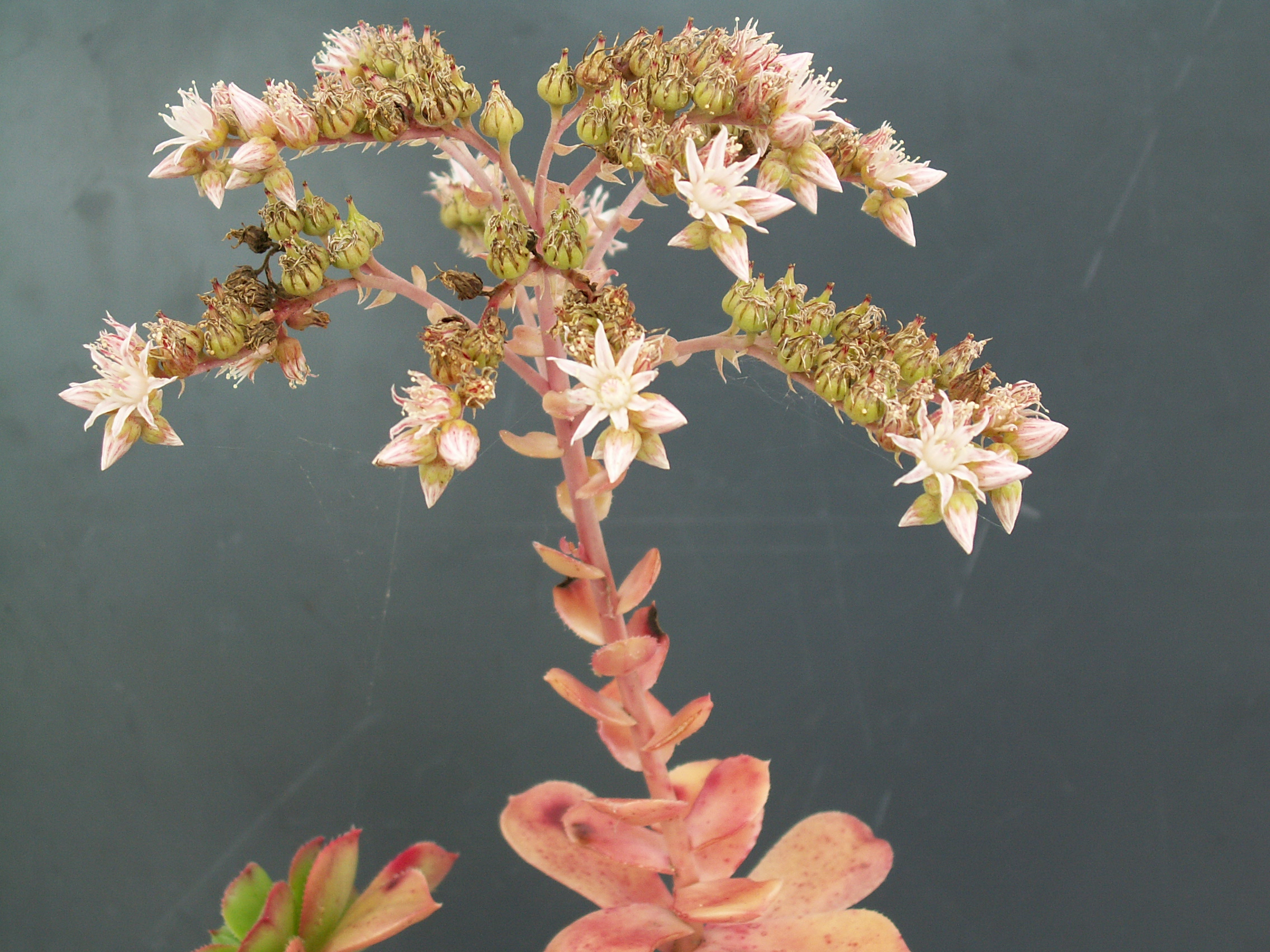
Inflorescence

It grows as a densely branched small shrub and reaches stature heights of up to 60 centimeters (24 in). The almost bare, somewhat mesh-like, ascending or hanging, winding shoots have a diameter of 3 to 6 millimeters. Their rather flat rosettes reach a diameter of 6 to 11 centimeters. The inner leaves are more or less upright. The obovate, green or yellowish green, often very heavily bluish, almost bare leaves are 3 to 5.5 centimeters long, 1.5 to 3 centimeters wide and 0.25 to 0.4 centimeters thick. They are pointed and trimmed towards the top. The base is wedge-shaped. The leaf margin is covered with curved eyelashes that are 0.4 to 0.8 millimeters long. The leaves are often reddish variegated along the edge.

It has panicles of cream-colored pointed flowers produced in spring. The loose, hemispherical inflorescence has a length of 6 to 16 centimeters (2.4 to 6.3 in) and a width of 6 to 16 centimeters 60 centimeters (24 in). The peduncle is 1 to 9 centimeters long. The seven-to nine-digit flowers are on a 2 to 12 millimeter long, bare flower stem. Its sepals are bald. The pale yellow to whitish, pink variegated, lanceolate, pointed petals are 7 to 9 millimeters long and 1.2 to 1.8 millimeters wide. The stamens are almost glabrous to sparsely weak downy.

== Cultivars ==
- 'Kiwi'
- 'Variegatum'
- 'Bicolor'
