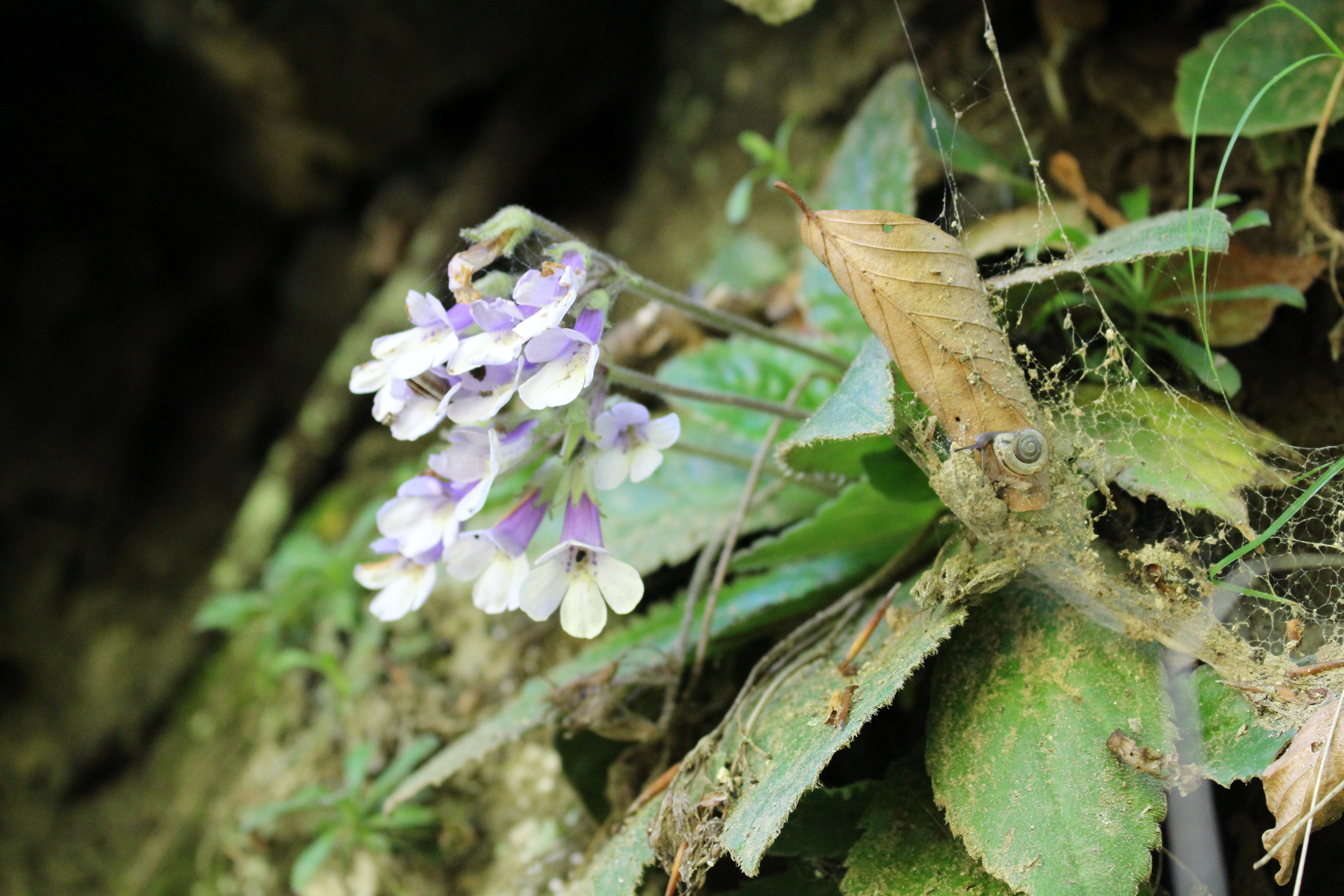
- Haberlea rhodopensis in Bulgaria

Conservation status
- Least Concern (IUCN 3.1)

Scientific classification
- Kingdom: Plantae
- Clade: Tracheophytes
- Clade: Angiosperms
- Clade: Eudicots
- Clade: Asterids
- Order: Lamiales
- Family: Gesneriaceae
- Subfamily: Didymocarpoideae
- Genus: Haberlea; Friv.
- Species: H. rhodopensis

Binomial name
- Haberlea rhodopensis Friv.

Synonyms
- Haberlea ferdinandi-coburgii

= Haberlea =

Genus of flowering plants

Haberlea is a monotypic genus of flowering plants in the family Gesneriaceae. The only member of this genus, Haberlea rhodopensis, is endemic to parts of Bulgaria and a small part of northern Greece, especially in the Rhodope Mountains. Common names include Orpheus flower and resurrection plant because of the remarkable ability of Haberlea to survive very long periods of desiccation.

The species is a stemless, evergreen perennial found in north-facing rocky habitats. Basal rosettes of dark green leaves bear trumpet-shaped flowers in shades of white, violet or purple in spring and summer.

Despite the zygomorphic nectar-producing flowers (which are considered an ancestral character) and the overall trend in Gesneriaceae, Haberlea rhodopensis is only rarely pollinated by bees and does not have specific pollinators. Its evolution has switched in the direction of providing pollen as a reward and generalisation of pollinating insects, a trend that is observed in the only other European genus (Ramonda) of the generally tropical and subtropical family Gesneriaceae. Active pollinators of Haberlea are syrphids (hoverflies) and Lasioglossum morio bees (Hymenoptera, Halictidae) which are characterised by low preferential behaviour regarding the plants that they visit for food.

Haberlea rhodopensis, also known as Orpheus flower, resurrecting flower, and Rhodope Silivryak, is a rare ancient relict flower, native to the mountains of Bulgaria and adjacent northern Greece. There are approximately 20 areas in Bulgaria where Haberlea rhodopensis grows in nature; it can be found at various altitudes up to almost 2000 metres above sea level. Most locations are found in the Rhodope Mountains of Bulgaria and northern Greece, but smaller populations are also found in Stara Planina region of Bulgaria. The extent of occurrence is estimated to be smaller than 20,000 km². Although rare and protected, the overall population trend is stable, and the habitat is not threatened.

Haberlea rhodopensis and approximately 350 other plant species are called 'resurrection' plants. The Orpheus flower is among the most interesting and rare representatives of Bulgarian flora, and a unique plant in many ways. It possesses a property unique among flowering plants (angiosperms) to survive extreme and prolonged dehydration, falling into an anabiotic state that mimics death. It was documented about 70 years ago that Haberlea rhodopensis can survive three years dried in a herbarium. When the water is available again, the plants can recover (resurrect) in less than two days and have full restoration of all activities.

== Botany ==
Haberlea rhodopensis, otherwise known as the resurrection flower, Silivryak (Bulgarian name) is an evergreen perennial plant. It has basal rosettes of dark green serrated and slightly curly leaves, and bears trumpet-shaped flowers in different shades in spring and summer. The flowers range from pale pink to dark purple. The flower is sensitive to light. When in shade, its flowers are closed. When in sunlight, the flowers open immediately. It grows in damp, shady, north-facing places, mainly on limestone or volcanic rock. The root system is very weak. When scientists from botanical gardens around the world turn to their Bulgarian counterparts to send them Haberlea rhodopensis, they do not receive seeds, as is done in such cases, but they may get dried plants. It has been proven that during desiccation, the herb retains part of its water content, while its metabolism continues at a very slow pace.

=== Evolution ===
Haberlea rhodopensis is an Ice Age relic that survived the spread of the European ice sheets in the refuge of southern Europe. It became a separate plant species about 25 million years ago, divided from its close relative species Ramonda serbica (Serbian ramonda; Serbian phoenix flower).

== Etymology ==
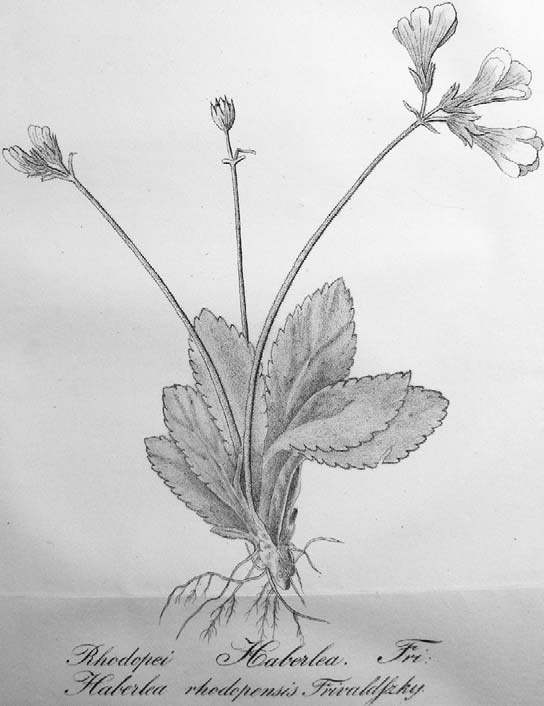
Reproduction of original illustration of Haberlea rhodopensis from Frivaldszky, 1835.

The plant was found in 1834 by I. Frivaldszky, curator of the Hungarian National Museum, during his first botanical/zoological expedition to the Rhodope Mountains, now Bulgaria. Frivaldszky concluded that it was a species new to science and decided to establish a new genus Haberlea for it. Karl Konstantin Haberle, his tutor, was a German scientist who moved to Buda (then Austria-Hungary) in 1813 and became head of the botany department and the botanical garden of the university. Frivaldszky's description of the plant appeared in 1835 in Magyar Tudós Társaság Évkönyvei (Annals of the Hungarian Academy of Sciences), vol. 2. p. 249, with a black-and-white illustration on the previous page.

Almost a century later, the resurrection behaviour of the species was documented by a young Bulgarian scientist. He published a paper describing experiments where dry Haberlea plants were able to recover after three years in a herbarium. This is one of the first papers ever on resurrection plants in the scientific world.

== Uses ==
Apart from its typical resurrection capacity, it is also fascinating as a potential source of bioactive compounds with application in pharmacology, veterinary medicine, and cosmetics. Different phytochemical studies indicated that Haberlea rhodopensis contains flavonoids, tannins, polysaccharides, lipids, saccharides, carbohydrates, phytosterols, glycosides, saponins, slimes, five free phenolic acids, carotenoids, hesperidin, mustard, and ferulic acids.

Haberlea rhodopensis (pale lilac flowers) has gained the Royal Horticultural Society's Award of Garden Merit.

=== Medicine ===
Haberlea rhodopensis is one of the ingredients in the Tibetan tea of youth. Due to the exceptional strength of the herb, it can be drunk only once every five years. In addition, one of the local plant names in the Rhodope mountains is "shap" (foot and mouth disease) which is considered as a confirmation that the local people were using the plant against animal diseases. Scientists from University of Plovdiv and Medical University Plovdiv of Bulgaria are currently studying the plant in-depth; first results show that it helps in the natural healing processes of damaged tissues. In 2014, the plant was studied as a potential source of novel cancer modulating drugs. Moreover, it has been found that alcohol extracts from Haberlea rhodopensis were shown to possess "antioxidant, antiviral, antibacterial, and antifungal activities". The cell protective effects are yet to be fully understood.

=== Cosmetic ===
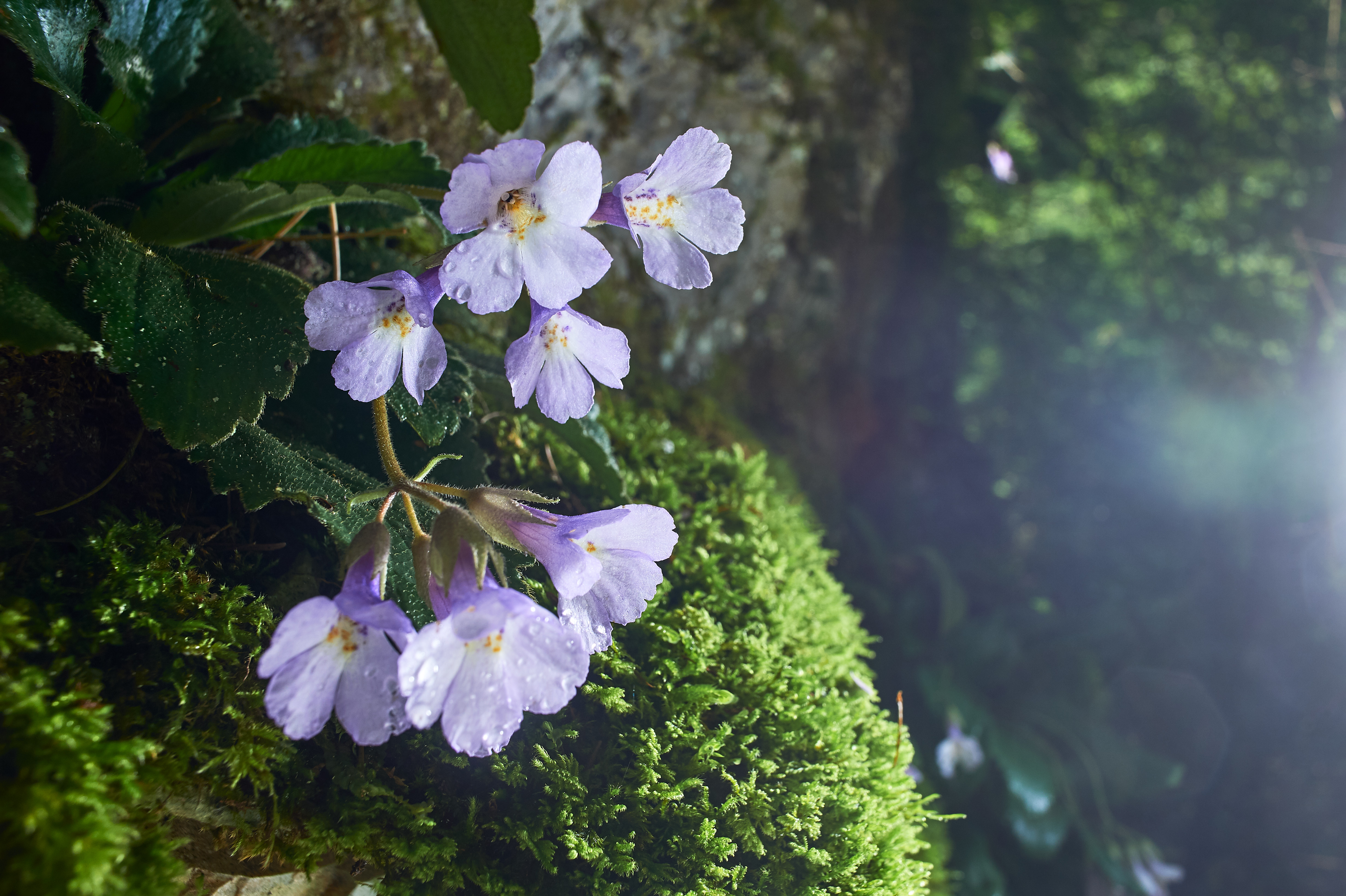
Orpheus flower

In 2011, research discovered cosmetic benefits of a myconoside-rich extract from Haberlea rhodopensis. The plant develops molecules to survive drought stress and these molecules enable the plant to reemerge from a state of desiccation. A specific fraction from the plant (Haberlea extract) was extracted. Peroxide-stressed normal human dermal fibroblasts treated with the Haberlea extract showed increased collagen and elastin synthesis. This effect was superior to those obtained with benchmark retinoic acid and retinol. When used at 3% in human skin biopsies, Haberlea extracts protected against UV-induced dermis oxidation by 100%, as evidenced by immunohistochemistry. Finally, when tested in 20 human volunteers at 3% in cream against a placebo, Haberlea extract increased skin elasticity and skin radiance after only 15 days of treatment, with the effect sustained after 30 and 60 days of treatment. It was demonstrated that by using Haberlea extract (particularly rich in glycoside myconoside), it is possible to strongly stimulate antioxidant skin defenses and extracellular matrix protein synthesis. The extract can be suggested for anti-aging treatments, intended for claims such as protection from oxidation, increased skin elasticity, and enhanced skin radiance.

Rich in powerful polyphenols that help the flower survive and thrive in extreme conditions, this potent extract strengthens the epidermis and helps naturally recover its water loss, while protecting the newly rejuvenated skin from environmental stressors and resulting in more resilient and brighter skin. Lab studies also show that it builds up collagen and elastin in the dermis.

== Art and symbolism ==
Haberlea rhodopensis possesses archaeological, historical, and ethnobotanical value. The interest in this unique plant dates from ancient times. A coin issued by the emperor Antonius Pius with the image of the Haberlea rhodopensis is an example. Depicted is the goddess Rhodope (with marked name) holding in her left hand the flower of Orpheus. It is said that Romans believed the plant to bring their people health, longevity, and tranquility.

As early as 4000-5000 BC. the Thracians knew the miraculous properties of the Rhodope Silivriak. The Romans came to the Rhodopes to drink from the divine ragweed, prepared with the Orpheus flower only from the local Thracians.

== Legends ==
An ancient legend tells of the little purple flower was born from the tears of Orpheus. The love between Orpheus and his beloved Eurydice happened at first sight. Soon after their first meeting, the two decided to marry. On their wedding day, there was a guest who despised Orpheus and desired Eurydice for his own. Aristaeus planned to kill Orpheus, but his plan was destroyed when the newlyweds saw him hiding in the bushes and started running. While running through a field of tall grass, Eurydice fell on the ground. Orpheus rushed to her rescue and found her lying lifeless in the field. He saw a nest of viper snakes next to her and realized she was bitten in the ankle. This grave bite took her life. Grief-stricken, the songs that he sang in the moments following her death brought tears to all the nymphs and gods. This tragic event would forever change Orpheus but from it, something magical would bloom, the Orpheus flower.

According to another legend, Orpheus angered Dionysus. He ordered the Bacchanalians to tear Orpheus' body apart and send him to different countries so that no one would gather his parts. When the mythical singer was killed, every drop of his blood gave birth to a beautiful light-coloured flower, which they called the Orpheus flower, the flower with wonder-working capabilities.

The herb is a light opiate, and a time ago the shamans used to burn it so that they can go into trance thus talking to spirits and making prophecies. Haberlea rhodopensis has also been thought to be part of the ambrosia—the drink of Gods. There are rumours that the ancient Thracians knew about the healing strength of the plant. In this respect, the species became involved in ancient myths, legends, and rituals.

== See also ==
- List of Balkan endemic plants

== Bibliography ==
- EXAMINATION OF THE ANTIOXIDANT ACTIVITY OF HABERLEA RHODOPENSIS LEAF EXTRACTS AND THEIR PHENOLIC CONSTITUENTSjfbc_609 1..7, DASHA MIHAYLOVA1,3, SLAVA BAHCHEVANSKA1 and VALENTINA TONEVA2 1Department of Biotechnology, University of Food Technologies, 26 Maritza Blvd., 4002 Plovdiv, Bulgaria, 2Department of Plant Physiology and Molecular Biology, Plovdiv University "P. Hilendarski", Plovdiv, Bulgaria, July 18, 2011
- Ecological Characteristics and Conservation of the Protected Resurrection Species Haberlea Rhodopensis Friv. as In Vitro Plants Through a Modified Micropropagation System, E. Daskalova, S. Dontcheva, G. Yahubyan, I. Minkov & V. Toneva Biotechnology & Biotechnological Equipment, ISSN: 1310-2818 (Print) 1314-3530 (Online) Journal homepage: http://www.tandfonline.com/loi/tbeq20
- PROCEEDINGS OF THE BALKAN SCIENTIFIC CONFERENCE OF BIOLOGY IN PLOVDIV (BULGARIA) FROM 19TH TILL 21ST OF MAY 2005 (EDS B. GRUEV, M. NIKOLOVA AND A. DONEV), 2005 (P. 226–230)
- Natural products from resurrection plants: Potential for medical applications, Tsanko S. Gechev, Jacques Hille, Herman J.Woerdenbag, Maria Benina, Nikolay Mehterov, Valentina Toneva, Alisdair R. Fernie, Bernd Mueller-Roeber, Biotechnology Advances 32 (2014) 1091–1101, 26 March 2014
- THE EUROPEAN PALEOENDEMIC HABERLEA RHODOPENSIS (GESNERIACEAE) HAS AN OLIGOCENE ORIGIN AND A PLEISTOCENE DIVERSIFICATION AND OCCURS IN A LONG-PERSISTING REFUGIAL AREA IN SOUTHEASTERN EUROPE Galya Petrova, Daniela Moyankova, Kanae Nishii, Laura Forrest, Ioannis Tsiripidis, Andreas D. Drouzas, Dimitar Djilianov, and Michael Möller, Int. J. Plant Sci. 176(6):499–514. 2015. 2015 by The University of Chicago. All rights reserved.
