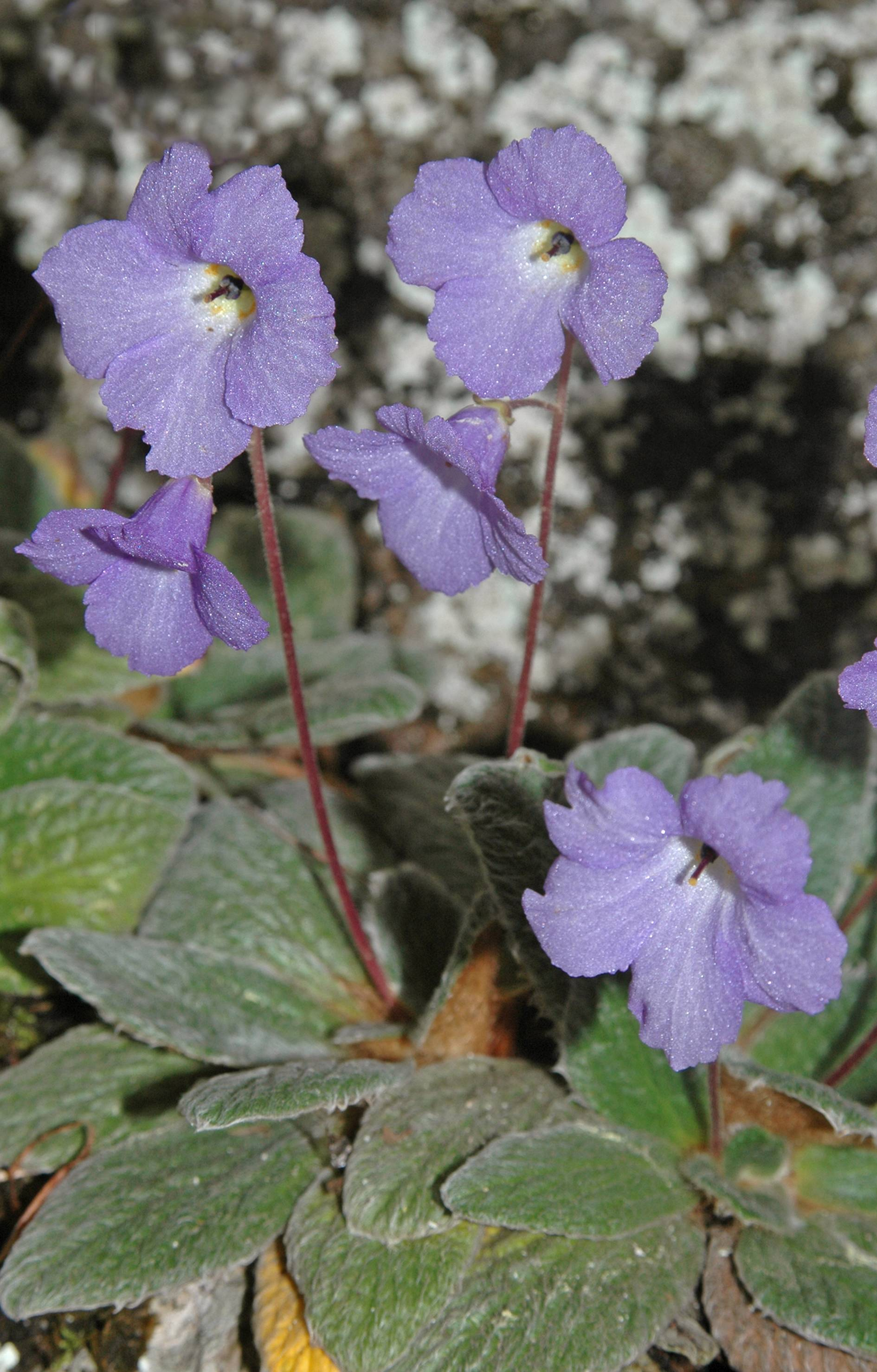
- Jankaea heldreichii flowers and leaves

Conservation status
- Near Threatened (IUCN 3.1)

Scientific classification
- Kingdom: Plantae
- Clade: Tracheophytes
- Clade: Angiosperms
- Clade: Eudicots
- Clade: Asterids
- Order: Lamiales
- Family: Gesneriaceae
- Genus: Ramonda
- Species: R. heldreichii

Binomial name
- Ramonda heldreichii (Boiss.) C.B.Clarke

Synonyms
- Haberlea heldreichii Boiss.; Jankaea heldreichii (Boiss.) Boiss.

= Ramonda heldreichii =

Genus of flowering plants

Ramonda heldreichii is a species of flowering plant in the family Gesneriaceae. It was formerly treated as Jankaea heldreichii, the only member of the monotypic genus Jankaea. It is endemic to Mount Olympus in Greece where it is a relict species from the Tertiary period.

== Description ==
Ramonda heldreichii is a small perennial plant with a rosette of ovate basal leaves with entire edges clad in long thick hairs. The flower heads have one to three nodding flowers and are held above the leaves on short stalks. The calyx has five lobes, the violet-coloured corolla has four, or occasionally five, lobes and the fruit is a capsule containing numerous small seeds.

== Distribution and habitat ==
Ramonda heldreichii is endemic to the northern and eastern slopes of Mount Olympus in Greece. It typically grows in damp cracks and crevices on limestone rocks on the northern and eastern sides of the mountain, especially near streams. Its altitudinal range is between 400 and 2,400 m (1,300 and 7,900 ft) but it is most common between 700 and 1,400 m (2,300 and 4,600 ft). It is a relict species from the tertiary period; it once had a more widespread distribution but as the climate changed, suitable habitat for the plant dwindled, and it became confined to its present range.

== Status ==
Although restricted to a small area, a study of the phenology of the flowering of this species, its method of pollination and its reproductive success show that it is not seriously endangered at the moment. Several species of bumblebees visit the blooms, but the flowers do not produce any nectar thereby reducing their attractiveness to insects. The main threat faced by the species is the pressure from tourists on Mount Olympus and the uncontrolled collection of the plant, despite the area being in a national park. The International Union for Conservation of Nature has assessed its conservation status as being "near threatened", on the basis that it is not threatened at the moment but its limited population and small range make it vulnerable to habitat disturbance. The plant is protected under the Bern Convention and most of its range is inside the Olympus National Park.

== See also ==
- List of Balkan endemic plants
