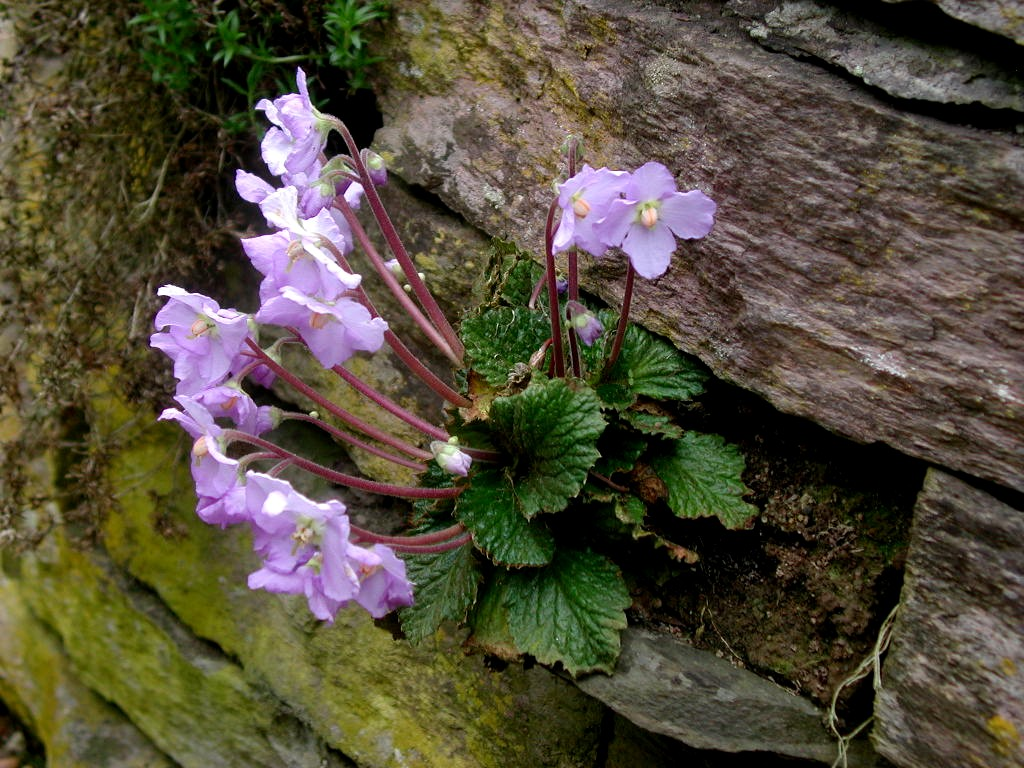

Scientific classification
- Kingdom: Plantae
- Clade: Tracheophytes
- Clade: Angiosperms
- Clade: Eudicots
- Clade: Asterids
- Order: Lamiales
- Family: Gesneriaceae
- Genus: Ramonda
- Species: R. nathaliae

Binomial name
- Ramonda nathaliae Pančić & Petrović

Synonyms
- Chaixia nathaliae (Pančić & Petrović) O.Schwarz; Ramonda nathaliae f. jankovicii Gajić; Ramonda nathaliae f. serbicifolia Gajić

= Ramonda nathaliae =

Species of flowering plant

Ramonda nathaliae or Natalie's ramonda (Serbian: Наталијина рамонда, romanized: Natalijina ramonda; Macedonian: Наталиева рамонда, romanized: Natalieva ramonda) is a species of flowering plant in the family Gesneriaceae. It was discovered in 1884 near the city of Niš by botanists Sava Petrović and Josif Pančić, who named it after Queen Natalie of Serbia (1882–1889).

Natalie's ramonda possesses the ability to revive even when fully dehydrated and demonstrates adaptability to harsh environments. The flower is one of the national symbols of Serbia, reflecting the resilience of the Serbian struggle in World War I and symbolizing the rebirth and revival of the country.

== Description ==
Ramonda nathaliae's natural habitat is Serbia, North Macedonia and Greece (Kilkis region). It is small and adaptable to harsh environments. It grows to 10 centimetres in height in angles on rocks, and it endures temperatures as low as −15 °C. It has clusters of flat, lilac-blue flowers in late spring surrounded by evergreen leaves. It is a poikilohydryc plant.

It has earned the Royal Horticultural Society's Award of Garden Merit.

== World War I remembrance symbol ==
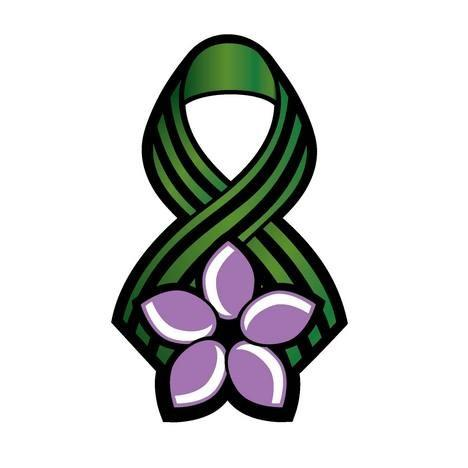
Remembrance badge with Natalie's Ramonda and the green-and-black ribbon

The flower is considered a symbol of Serbia's campaign and victory in World War I. To commemorate Serbian soldiers who died in war, as well as the resurrection of the country, people wear artificial Natalie's ramonda flowers as a symbol of remembrance. This tradition is observed in the week leading up to Armistice Day and is similar to the wearing of the remembrance poppy amongst the Commonwealth countries.

The idea originated in 2012 from Marko Đurić, the then-adviser to president of Serbia, Tomislav Nikolić. The badge worn on Armistice Day combines the ramonda and the green-and-black Commemorative Medal for Loyalty to the Fatherland in 1915 ribbon. The idea was put into practice in 2013, a year after the Armistice Day became a public holiday in Serbia.

== See also ==
- Ramonda serbica
- List of Balkan endemic plants
- National symbols of Serbia
- Ramonda (song)
