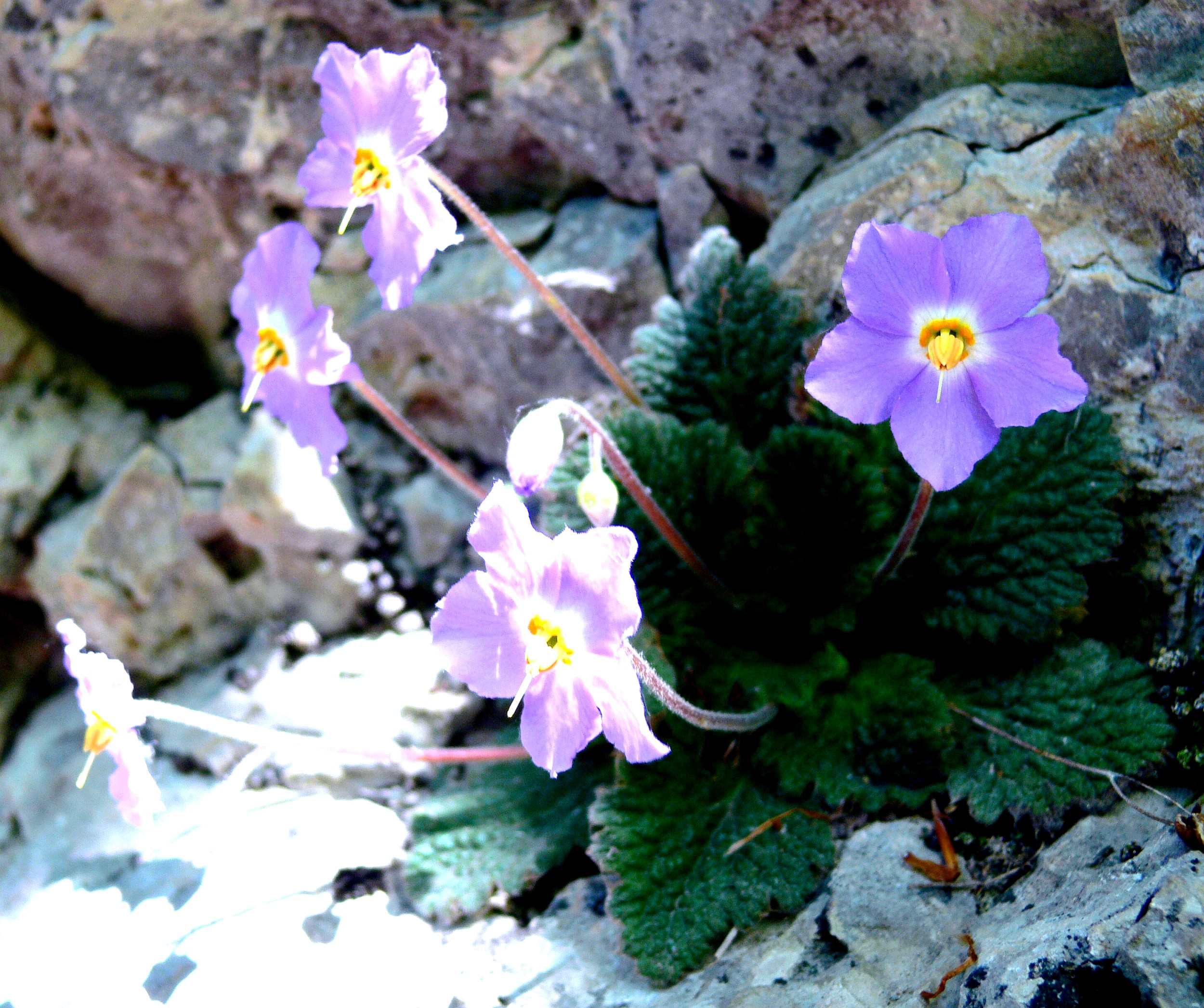
- Ramonda myconi

Scientific classification
- Kingdom: Plantae
- Clade: Embryophytes
- Clade: Tracheophytes
- Clade: Spermatophytes
- Clade: Angiosperms
- Clade: Eudicots
- Clade: Asterids
- Order: Lamiales
- Family: Gesneriaceae
- Genus: Ramonda; Rich. (1805)

Synonyms
- Chaixia Lapeyr.; Jancaea Boiss.; Jankaea Boiss.; × Jankaemonda Halda; Lobirota Dulac; Myconia Vent.

= Ramonda (plant) =

Genus of flowering plants

Ramonda is a genus of four species of flowering plants in the family Gesneriaceae, native to shady, rocky places in north eastern Spain, the Pyrenees and south eastern Europe. They are evergreen poikilohydryc perennials which form rosettes of crinkly leaves with nearly actinomorphic flowers, borne on leafless stems in spring.

The genus is named after the French botanist and explorer Louis Ramond de Carbonnières, who was among the first to explore the high Pyrenees.

== Species ==
As of April 2021, Plants of the World Online accepted the following species, including one transferred from the former monotypic genus Jankaea:

- Ramonda heldreichii (Boiss.) C.B.Clarke, syn. Jankaea heldreichii
- Ramonda myconi (L.) Rchb., syn. R. pyrenaica
- Ramonda nathaliae Pancic & Petrovic
- Ramonda serbica Pancic
