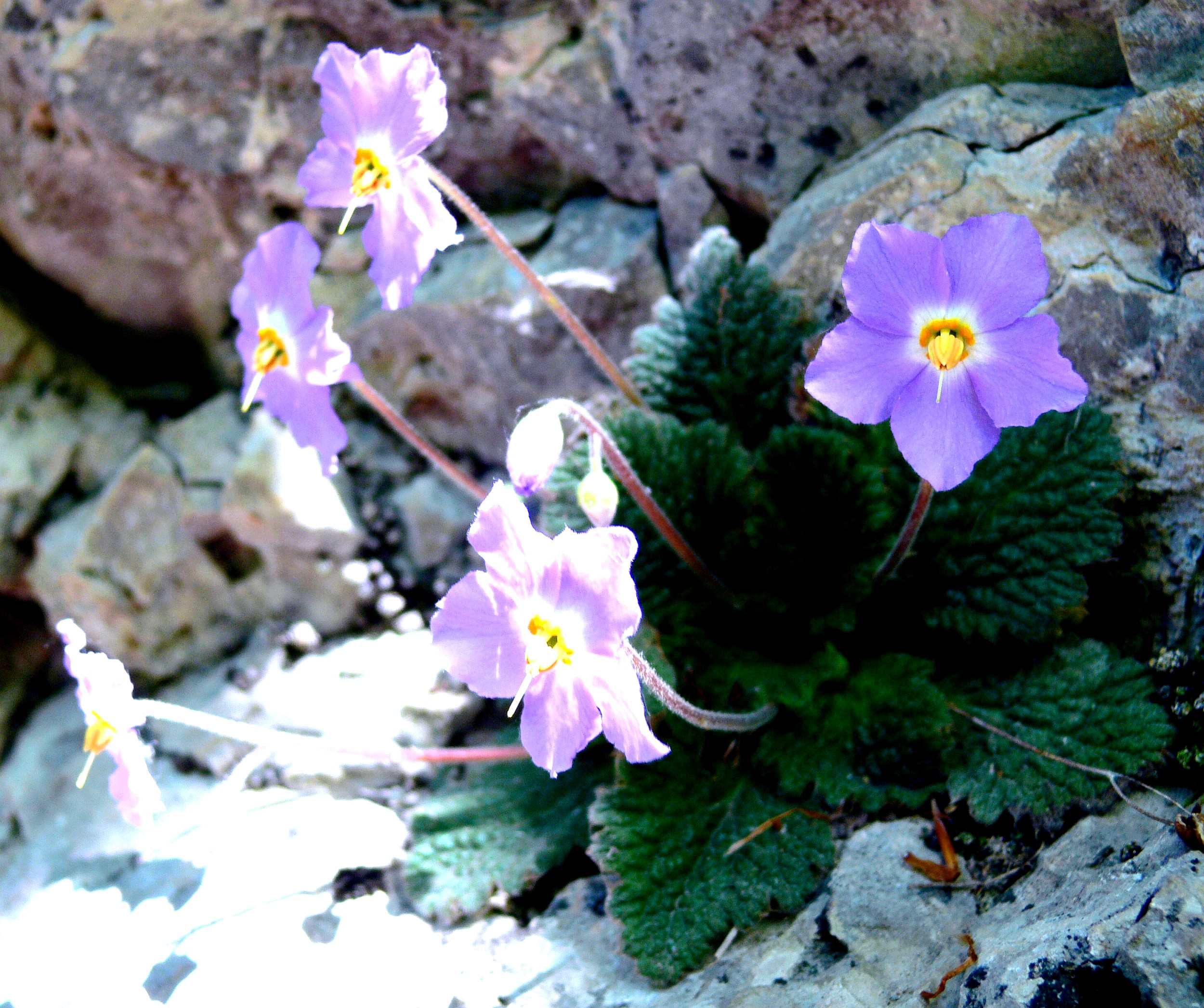

Scientific classification
- Kingdom: Plantae
- Clade: Tracheophytes
- Clade: Angiosperms
- Clade: Eudicots
- Clade: Asterids
- Order: Lamiales
- Family: Gesneriaceae
- Genus: Ramonda
- Species: R. myconi

Binomial name
- Ramonda myconi (L.) Rchb.

Synonyms
- Chaixia myconi (L.) Lapeyr.; Ramonda chloropoda Jord.; Ramonda crenulata Jord.; Ramonda floribunda Jord.; Ramonda lobulosa Jord.; Ramonda micoi Pau [Spelling variant]; Ramonda pyrenaica Rich. nom. illeg.; Ramonda scapiflora J.St.-Hil.; Verbascum myconi L.

= Ramonda myconi =

Species of flowering plant

Ramonda myconi, the Pyrenean-violet or rosette mullein, syn. R. pyrenaica, is a species of flowering plant in the family Gesneriaceae, which is a relictual endemite of shady, rocky places in the Pyrenees and north eastern Spain. It is a rosette-forming evergreen perennial growing to 10 cm (4 in) high by 20 cm (8 in) broad, with oval, crinkled leaves. Five-petalled purple flowers with prominent yellow anthers appear on leafless stems in spring.

The plant is cultivated, for instance in vertical crevices where its roots are not subject to winter wetness. It has gained the Royal Horticultural Society's Award of Garden Merit.

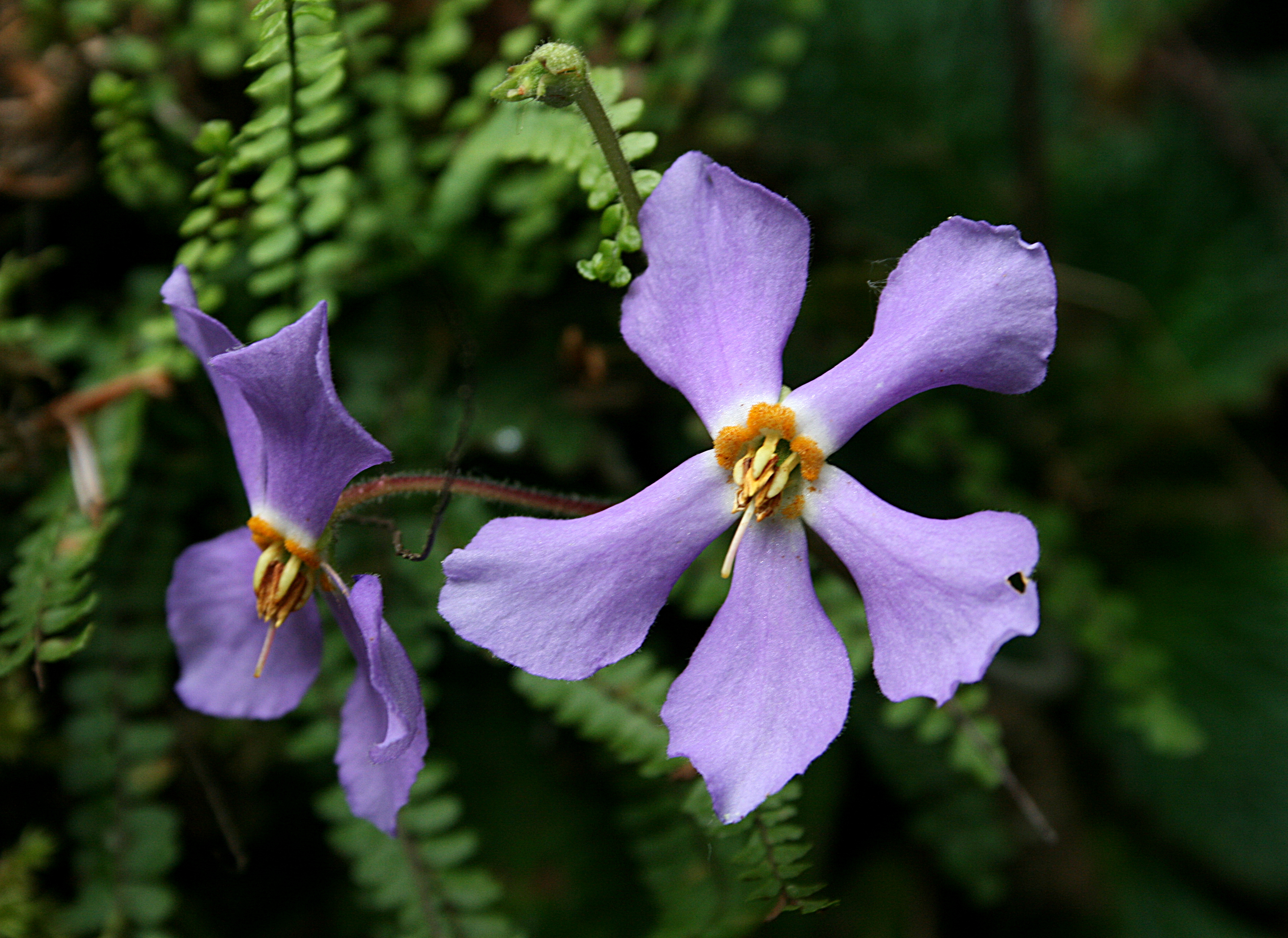

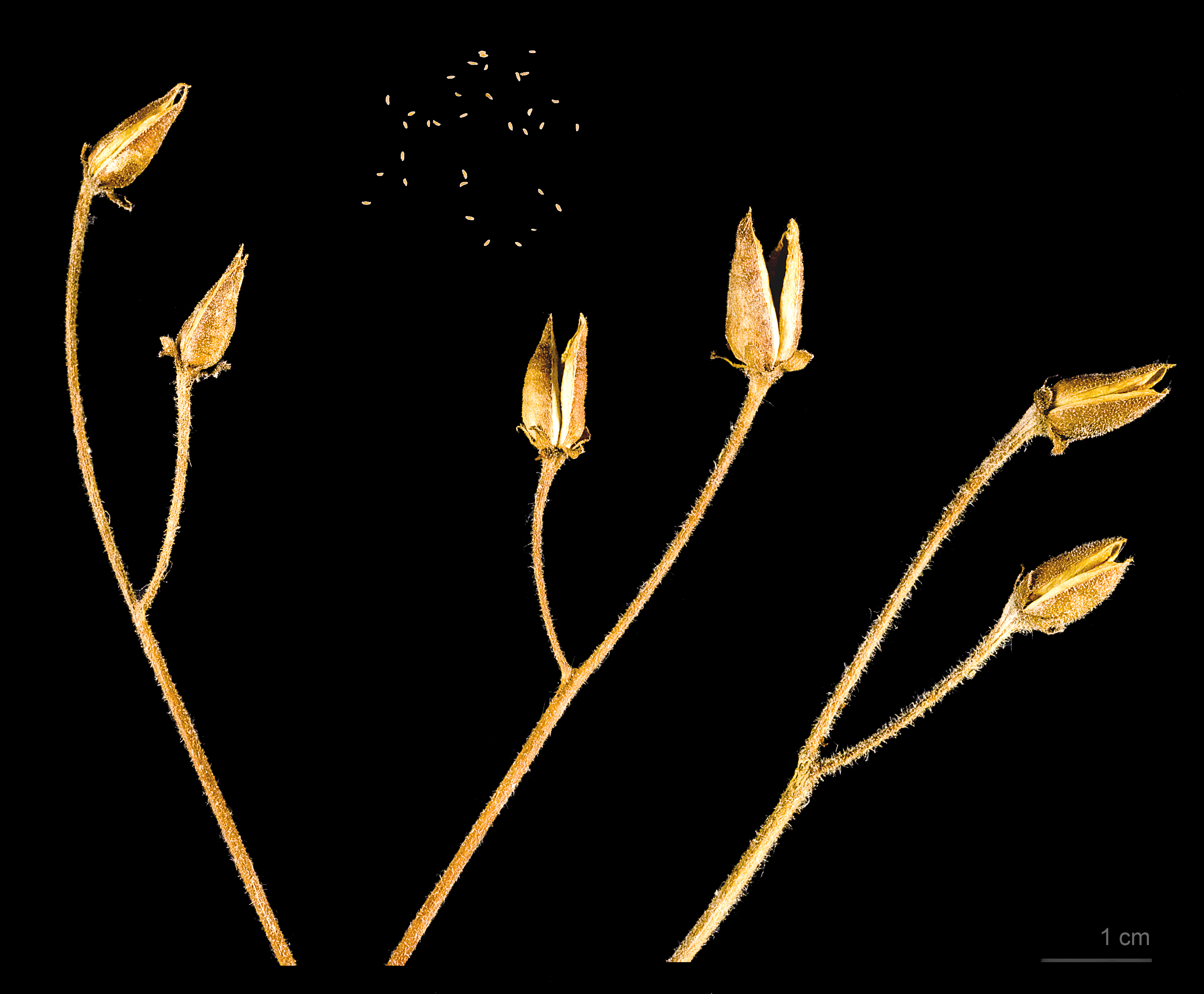
seedheads

The Ramonda myconi are a Mediterranean endemic species, meaning that the species is native to that geographic region. This species of flowering plant is isolated to the rocky terrains that border France and Spain. This species also belongs to a group known as resurrection plants. This means they can survive or tolerate severe desiccation or drought.
