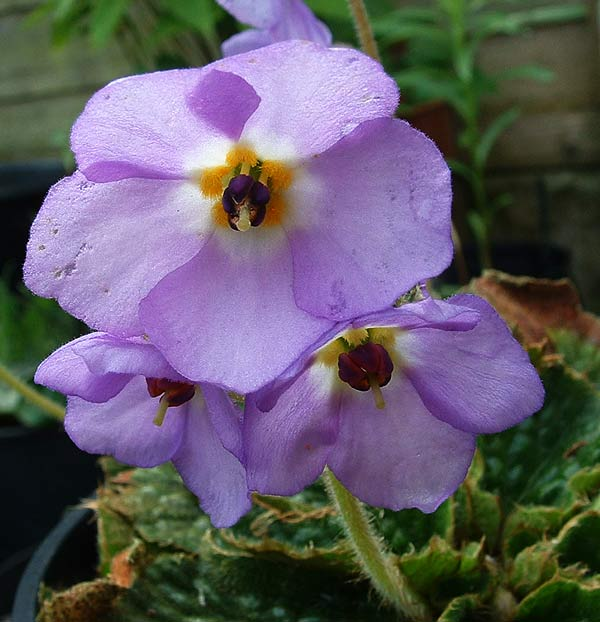

Scientific classification
- Kingdom: Plantae
- Clade: Tracheophytes
- Clade: Angiosperms
- Clade: Eudicots
- Clade: Asterids
- Order: Lamiales
- Family: Gesneriaceae
- Genus: Ramonda
- Species: R. serbica

Binomial name
- Ramonda serbica Pančić

Synonyms
- Chaixia serbica (Pančić) O.Schwarz

= Ramonda serbica =

Species of flowering plant

Ramonda serbica, also known as Serbian ramonda and Serbian phoenix flower, is a species in the family Gesneriaceae and are one of the four plants in the Ramonda genus. It was first discovered in 1874 near Niš, Serbia, by the Serbian botanist Josif Pančić. The Serbian ramonda is notable for its distinctive desiccation tolerance.

== Description ==
Ramonda stands as one of the rare European members of its plant family. Known for its remarkable resilience, this plant has the unique ability to revive when watered, even from a fully dehydrated state—an attribute commonly referred to as desiccation tolerance. It thrives in cool, damp, shaded environments, primarily on steep, north-facing limestone surfaces. The flower was first discovered in Serbia and its natural habitat is the Balkans.

=== Classification ===
Ramonda serbica is one of four plants in the Ramonda (plant) genus. Not to be confused with Ramonda nathaliae, these two flowers differ mainly in the shape and color of leaves, and in durability too. Although they belong to the same family, the only place in the world where these two Ramondas grow next to each other is the vicinity of Niš, Serbia.

== See also ==
- Ramonda nathaliae
- List of Balkan endemic plants
- National symbols of Serbia
- Ramonda (song)

== Bibliography ==
- Mike F. Quartacci, Olivera Glisic, Branka Stevanovic, and Flavia Navari-Izzo. Plasma membrane lipids in the resurrection plant Ramonda serbica following dehydration and rehydration. J. Exp. Bot 2001.53:2159-2166.
- Rix, E.M. & Webb, D.A. 1972. Ramonda L.C.M. Richard. - In: Tutin, T.G., Heywood, V.H., Burges, N.A., Moore, D.M., Valentine, D.H., Walters, S.M. & Webb, D.A. Flora Europaea vol. 3. Pp. Cambridge University Press, Cambridge.
- Markova, M. 1995. Ramonda. - In: Kozhuharov, S. Flora of People's Republic of Bulgaria. Vol. 10. pp. 288–289. Bulgarian Academy of Sciences Publishing House, Sofia. (In Bulgarian)
- Petrova, A. & Vladimirov, V. 2010. Balkan endemics in the Bulgarian flora. - Phytologia Balcanica 16(2): 293–311.
- Rakić, T., Gajić, G., Lazarević, M., & Stevanović, B. (2015). Effects of different light intensities, CO2 concentrations, temperatures and drought stress on photosynthetic activity in two paleoendemic resurrection plant species Ramonda Serbica and R. Nathaliae. Environmental and Experimental Botany, 109, 63–72
