= William Maxwell (clergyman) =

Church of Ireland clergyman (1732–1818)

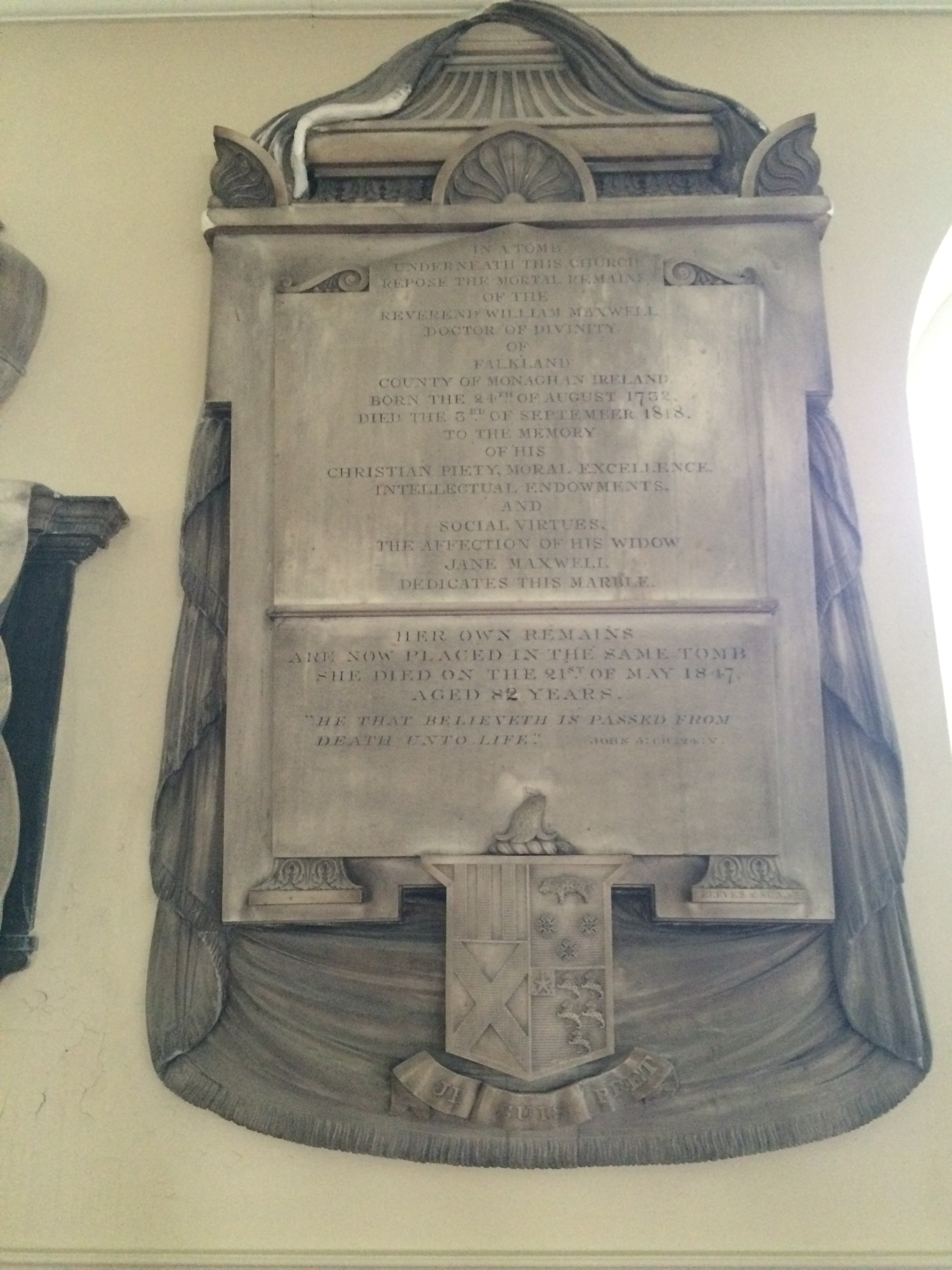
Memorial to William Maxwell in Walcot Church, Bath

William Maxwell was a clergyman, member of the landed gentry, and noted companion to Dr Johnson.

Maxwell was born 24 August 1732, in Donagh, County Monaghan, Ireland, the son of John Maxwell and Isabella Leavens of Falkland Castle.

== Education and family ==
He was educated at Trinity College Dublin which he entered on 3 November 1747, graduating B.A. in 1752, M.A. in 1755, and D.D. in 1777.

Maxwell became acquainted with Dr Samuel Johnson; the two quickly became good friends and Maxwell compiled many Johnsonianisms, which were entered into Boswell's work as Collecteanea and which represent a significant contribution to Johnsonian scholarship.

Maxwell married Anne Massingberd on 6 December 1777 in South Ormsby, Lincolnshire, England. They had four children, only two of whom survived into adulthood. In 1818, their daughter Anne Maxwell married Henry Francis Lyte and became the mother of several children, including Farnham Maxwell Lyte, and the grandmother of Sir Henry Maxwell Lyte.

== Death ==
Maxwell left his family seat Falkland Castle after being shot at by rebels, and moved to Bath. He died there on 3 September 1818, at Bennett Street, Bath.
