= Berry Head House =

Historic hotel in Devon, England

Coordinates: 50°24′2.9″N 3°29′40.7″W

Berry Head House (now used as the Berry Head Hotel) is a large detached house in Brixham, England. It is listed Grade II on the National Heritage List for England.

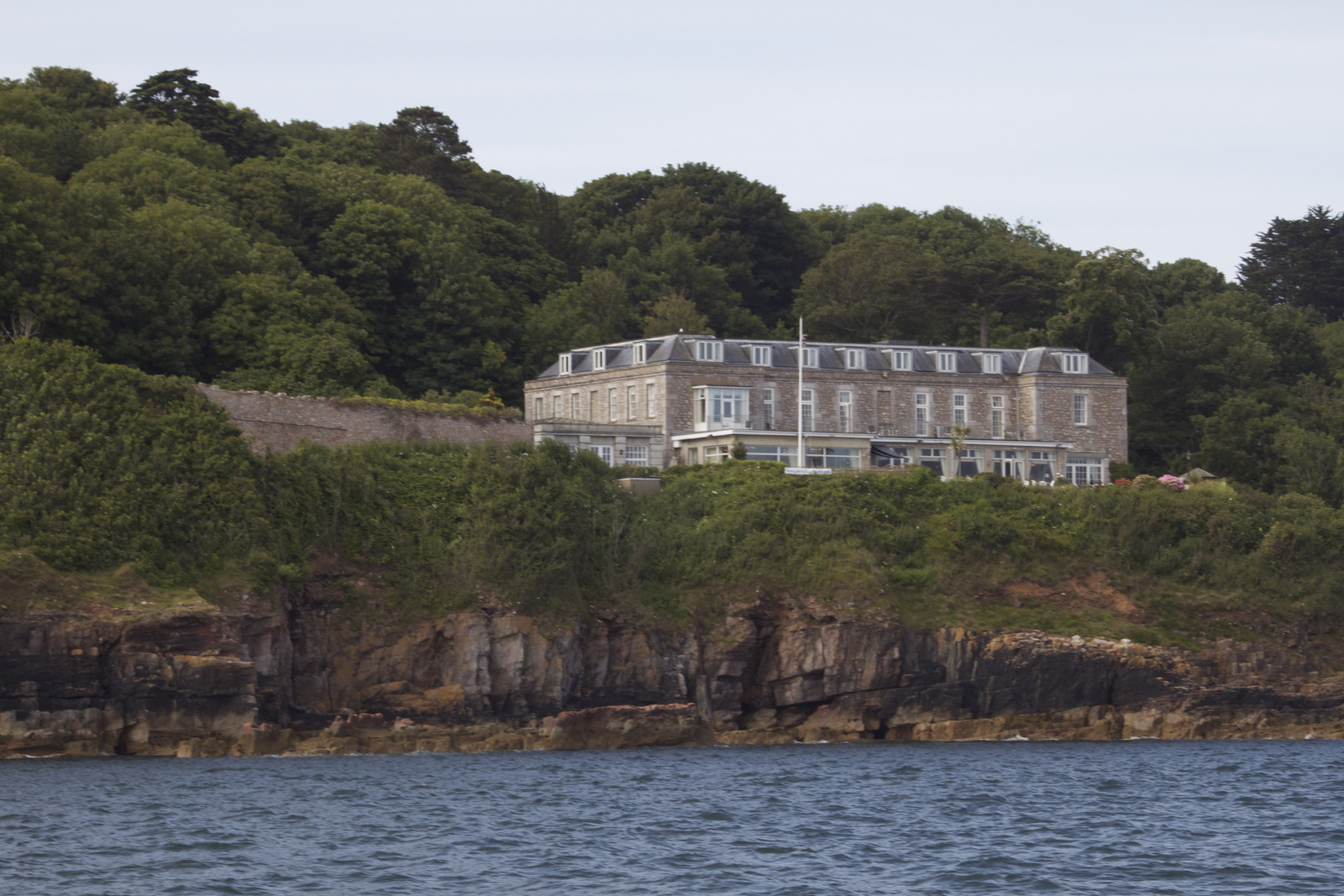
Berry Head House

== History ==
The building was originally built in 1809 by the Board of Ordinance as a military hospital in support of the three Napoleonic war forts on Berry Head.

Later it became the home of the hymnist and poet Henry Francis Lyte who turned the building into a country house and bought the surrounding lands.

== Library ==
In the ground of the property, Lyte wrote the words to the Hymn "Abide with Me" and "Praise, my soul, the King of heaven". Lyte built up a library in the house which was described as "one of the most valuable libraries in the Southwest of England". The library took 17 days of auctions to sell in London.

== Ownership ==
The building was also the home to the photographer Farnham Maxwell-Lyte and was linked to Sir Henry Churchill Maxwell-Lyte. Evelyn George Martin, a famous sailor, writer and cricketer, was a guest of the Lyte family, and lived at Berry Head between his school terms at Eton College. A plaque was unveiled in May 2013 to commemorate Martin's time spent at the house.

The house remained with Lyte's descendants until 1949 when it was turned into the Berry Head Hotel. The house was sold by James Arthur Palmes, only surviving son of Arthur Lindsay Palmes and Alice Massingberd Maxwell Hogg (granddaughter of HF Lyte) but other parts of the estate were sold off later, including the Berry Head Forts and Headland. Berry Head Farmhouse was sold by the family in the 1990s.

== Hotel ==
The hotel is currently run by a company called the Berry Head Hotel Limited and owned by the Bence Family.
