= Love and War in the Pyrenees =

2008 book by Rosemary Bailey

- Author: Rosemary Bailey
- Language: English
- Genre: Travel
- Publication date: 2008

Love and War in the Pyrenees is a book written by Rosemary Bailey. Bailey in 2008. The book was awarded the best narrative travel book by the British Guild of Travel Writers.

The book is about World War II in the Pyrenees region. Rebecca Abrams from The Jewish Chronicle described the book as "a quiet triumph of historical reconstruction."

== See also ==
- Sir Henry Russell-Killough
