= Rosemary Bailey =

Rosemary Bailey may refer to:

- Rosemary A. Bailey (born 1947), British statistician
- Rosemary Bailey (author) (1953–2019), British writer
