= John Cranston =

John Cranston may refer to:

- John Cranston (governor) (1625–1680), colonial governor of Rhode Island
- John Cranston (American football) (1865–1931), American football player and coach
- John Arnold Cranston (1891–1972), Scottish research chemist
- John Cranston (priest) Archdeacon of Clogher from 1718 until 1762
