= Berry Head =

Headland on the south coast of Devon, England

Coordinates: 50°23′56″N 3°29′20″W

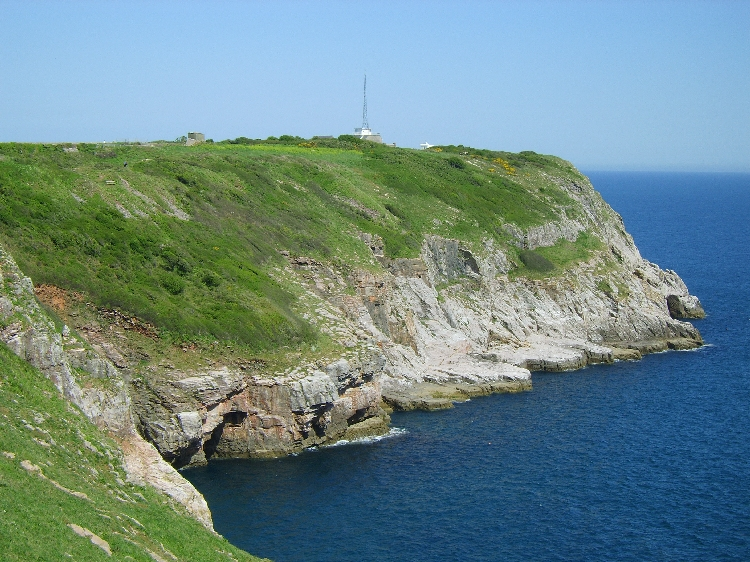
Berry Head, South Devon

Berry Head is a coastal headland that forms the southern boundary of Tor Bay in Devon, England. Lying to the east of the town of Brixham, it is a national nature reserve and a local nature reserve. Berry Head To Sharkham Point is a Site of Special Scientific Interest.

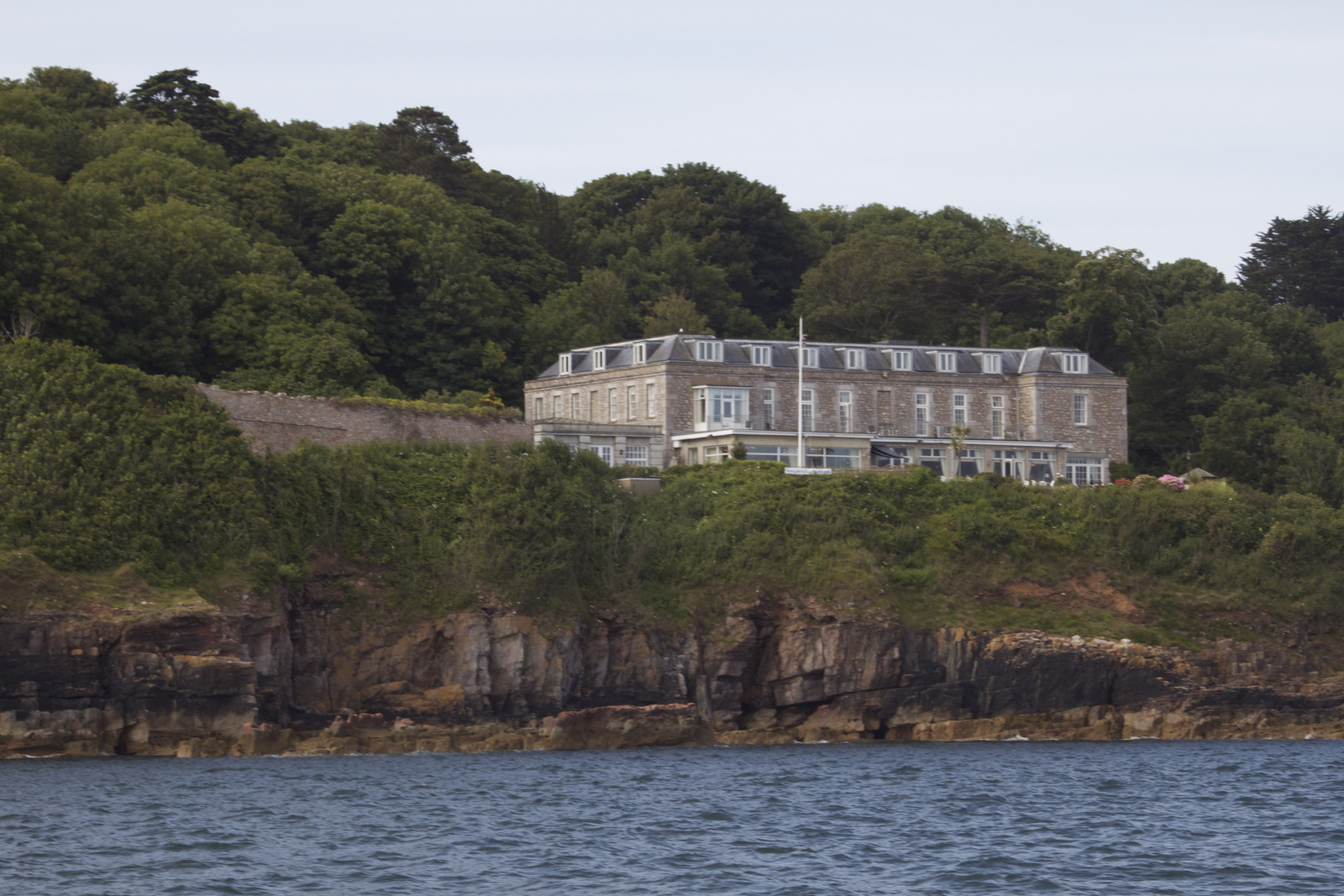
Berry Head Hotel

== Ecology ==
Berry Head to Sharkham Point is a haven for several nationally rare and threatened species which are dependent upon the thin limestone soils, mild climate and exposed conditions of the headland.

The coastal cliffs here are home to a seabird colony, including guillemots, razorbills and kittiwakes. Several rare vagrant birds have occurred here, including the first British record of yelkouan shearwater in July 2008. More recently, a Hume's warbler was discovered in November 2014.

The guillemot colony on the cliffs below the Southern Fort is one of the largest on England's south coast and can be closely watched live on CCTV in the Visitor Centre. Berry Head also acts as an important staging post for migrant birds; and is home to a significant number of cirl buntings.

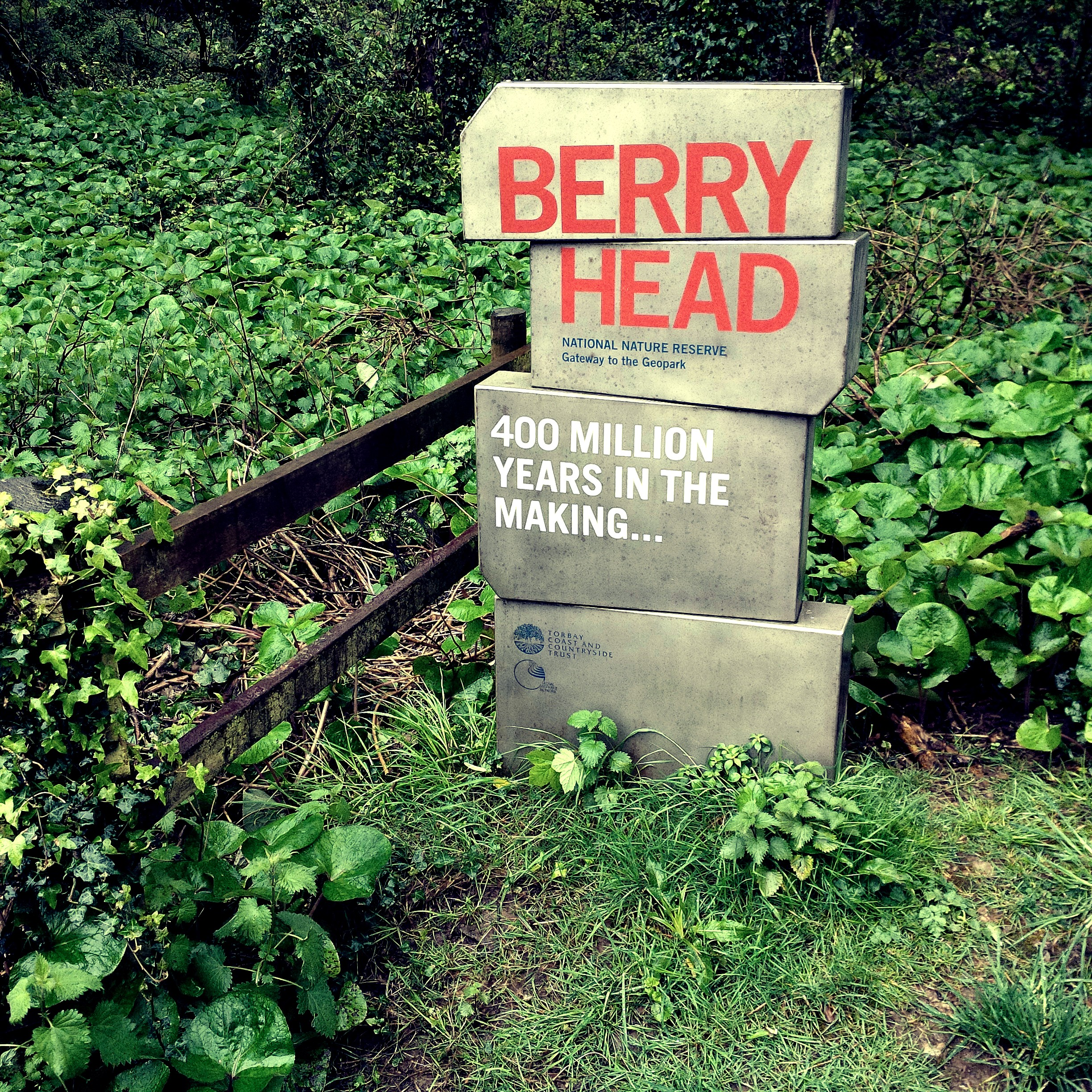
Gateway to the Geopark

The site is one of only two locations in Great Britain at which the white rock-rose, small hare’s ear and small restharrow occurs. Spring gentian, honewort, and goldilocks aster are also dependent upon the thin soils, mild climate and exposed conditions of the headland.

Caves at Berry Head are home to the endangered greater horseshoe bat. A small herd of North Devon cattle has been introduced to the headland to produce the cow pats that attract dung beetles on which young bats are particularly dependent for food.

== Fortifications ==
Berry Head is the site of an Iron Age hill fort which was mostly destroyed by the construction between 1794 and 1804 of extensive fortifications to protect the Torbay naval anchorage against threatened invasion by French armies.

The former artillery house now houses a public display, featuring details about the history of the area, its wildlife and how it became an important strategic point.

== Navigation aids ==
Berry Head is the location for the Berry Head Lighthouse and a VOR/DME beacon used for air traffic control.

Semaphore signalling apparatus was on Berry Head before 1875 and it acted as the Lloyds' Signal Station for Torbay.

== Hospital ==
The hospital was originally built by the Board of Ordnance as a military hospital in support of the three Napoleonic-era forts on Berry Head. Later it became the home of the hymnist and poet Henry Francis Lyte; it remained with Lyte's descendants until 1949 when it was turned into the Berry Head House Hotel. The building was also the home to the photographer Farnham Maxwell-Lyte. The cricketer Evelyn George Martin, a guest of Lyte's family, lived at Berry Head between his school terms at Eton College. A plaque was unveiled in May 2013 to commemorate Martin's time spent at the house.
