= Charles Packe (explorer) =

English lawyer and explorer

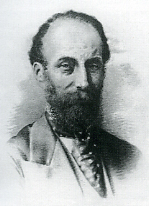
Charles Packe

Charles Packe (22 August 1826 – 16 July 1896) was an English lawyer and explorer who is noted for his travels in and writing about the Pyrenees.

== Family ==
Packe was born in 1826, the oldest son of Edmund Packe, a captain in the Royal Horse Guards.

== Pyrenees ==
Packe first went to the Pyrenees in 1853, making a traverse of the range. Two years later he travelled to the Alps, a description of which appeared in 1857 as The Spirit of Travel.

In 1857 and 1858 he returned to the Pyrenees for further explorative trips, and moved there permanently in 1859. In 1861 Packe made the second ascent of Posets (3371 m), the second-highest peak in the range, which had been first climbed in 1856 by H. Halket with the guides Pierre Redonnet and Pierre Barrau.

Just as Packe's friend Henry Russell's name is linked with the Vignemale, Packe's name is associated with the Balaïtous. The idea to try to climb this mountain came from his reading of John Ball's (the first president of the Alpine Club) account of his unsuccessful attempt to climb it in 1861. After a failed attempt in 1862, on 15 September 1864 Packe reached the summit with his guide Jean-Pierre Gaspard of Arrens; they had spent a week trying to find a suitable route. Although they believed that they had made the first ascent, the mountain had been previously climbed in 1825 by the French army officers Peytier and Hossard, as geodesic technicians. The ridge by which Packe and Gaspard made their ascent is now known as the Arête Packe-Russell.

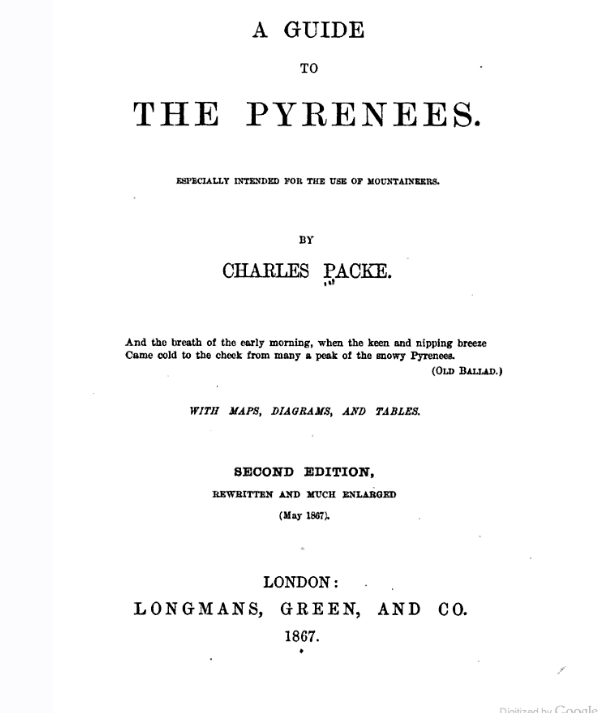
Title page of the second edition of Charles Packe's A Guide to the Pyrenees

=== A Guide to the Pyrenees ===
In 1862 Packe's A Guide to the Pyrenees (with the subtitle Especially Intended for the Use of Mountaineers) was first published; the second edition was brought out by the London firm of Longmans, Green, and Co.

=== Societé Ramond ===
Packe was one of the founding members of the Société Ramond, a learned society devoted to the study of the Pyrenees and founded in 1864 or 1865 (authorities vary) in Bagnères-de-Bigorre by Henry Russell, Émilien Frossard, Farnham Maxwell-Lyte and Packe. Packe was the society's first assistant secretary.

=== Botany ===
Packe discovered several plant species that are endemic to the Pyrenees and also carried out a number of experiments when attempting to acclimatize rare plants in his garden.
