= Observatoire Midi-Pyrénées =

Astronomy organisation in Toulouse, France

Coordinates: 43°33′44″N 1°28′47″E

The Observatoire Midi-Pyrénées (OMP) is an observatory of the sciences of the Universe associated with the Université Toulouse III – Paul Sabatier in France. It federates research laboratories in fields including astronomy and astrophysics, planetary sciences, and Earth and environmental sciences. Its mission is to coordinate and support research activities across these disciplines within the Toulouse scientific community.

== Units ==
- Bernard Lyot Telescope, at Pic du Midi Observatory
- Institut de recherche en astrophysique et planétologie (IRAP)
- Laboratoire d'aérologie (LA)
- Laboratoire Géosciences Environnement Toulouse (GET)
- Laboratoire d'études en géophysique et océanographie spatiales (LEGOS)
- Centre d'études spatiales de la biosphère (CESBIO)
- Laboratoire écologie fonctionnelle et environnement (EcoLab)
