= Henry Francis Lyte =

Scottish priest and poet (1793–1847)

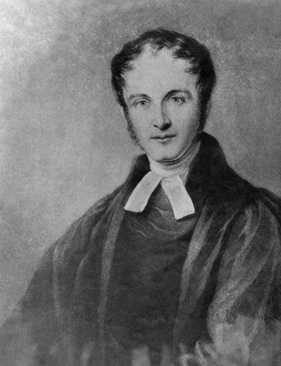
- Born: 1 June 1793; Ednam, Roxburghshire, Scotland
- Died: 20 November 1847 (aged 54); Nice, Kingdom of Sardinia
- Education: Trinity College, Dublin
- Known for: "Abide with Me"
- Spouse: Anne Maxwell (m. 1817)
- Children: 5, including Farnham
- Relatives: Henry Maxwell Lyte (grandson)

Henry Francis Lyte (1 June 1793 – 20 November 1847) was a British Anglican divine, hymnodist and poet who wrote the hymn Abide with Me.

== Life and career ==
=== Early life ===
Henry Francis Lyte was born in Ednam near Kelso in Roxburghshire, Scotland, the second son of Thomas Lyte, whose family had once lived at Lytes Cary, Somerset, in South West England, and Anna Maria Oliver. This family had been of great prominence as early as the reign of King Edward I, and its seat was at Lytes Cary Manor, but the house passed out of the family in 1748.

Thomas Lyte, an army captain, does not seem to have married Anna Maria Oliver, although it has been argued that since they were accepted as husband and wife in Scotland, where they lived, they legally were so, according to Scots law.

At the time of the Irish Rebellion of 1798, Thomas Lyte was an officer of the British forces sent to Ireland. He settled first at Dunmore, County Galway, and later at Ballyshannon, County Donegal, with Anna Maria Oliver, who claimed to be his wife, and their three sons. He has been described as a "ne-er do-well ... more interested in fishing and shooting than in facing up to his family responsibilities".

In August 1803, Thomas Lyte, reported as "late a Captain in the Northumberland Fencibles", was given a new commission as a Captain in the 1st Battalion of Reserve. When the young Henry Francis Lyte was nine, his father ran away from Anna Maria and his debtors, married Eliza Naghten in Roscommon, and settled in Jersey, where he had eight more children. He deserted his first family shortly after making arrangements for his two older sons to attend Portora Royal School in Enniskillen, County Fermanagh. Anna Marie moved back to England and soon became destitute. She and her youngest son are said to have died in London.

The headmaster at Portora, Robert Burrowes, recognised Lyte's abilities, paid the boy's school fees, and "welcomed him into his own family during the holidays". Lyte was effectively an adopted son.

=== Religious conversion ===
After studying at Trinity College, Dublin, and with very limited training for ordained ministry, Lyte took Anglican holy orders in 1815 and for some time he held a curacy in Taghmon near Wexford. Lyte's "sense of vocation was vague at this early stage. Perhaps he felt an indefinable desire to do something good in life". However, in about 1816, Lyte experienced an evangelical conversion. In attendance on a dying priest, the latter convinced Lyte that both had earlier been mistaken in not having taken the epistles of St Paul "in their plain and literal sense". Lyte began to study the Bible "and preach in another manner", following the example of four or five local clergy whom he had previously laughed at and considered "enthusiastic rhapsodists".

=== Early career and marriage ===
In 1817 Lyte became a curate in Marazion, Cornwall, and there met Anne Maxwell, a daughter of William Maxwell, of a well-known Ulster-Scots family. They were married by license at Walcot, Bath, on 21 January 1818. She was 31, seven years older than Lyte, and a "keen Methodist." On Sunday mornings in Brixham, Lyte would drive his wife to the Methodist society before proceeding to his own church, which she would attend in the evenings. She "could not match her husband's good looks and personal charm", but the marriage was happy and successful. Anne eventually made Lyte's situation more comfortable by contributing her family fortune, and she was an excellent manager of the house and finances. They had two daughters and three sons, one of whom was the chemist and photographer Farnham Maxwell Lyte. A grandson was the well known historian Henry Maxwell Lyte.

From 1820 to 1822 the Lytes lived in Sway, Hampshire. Itself only five miles (8 km) from the English Channel, the house in Sway was the only one the couple shared during their marriage that was neither on a river nor by the sea. At Sway, in 1821 Lyte lost a month-old daughter, Anna Maria. While there, he wrote his first book, later published as Tales In Verse Illustrative of the Several Petitions of the Lord's Prayer (1826). In 1822, the Lytes moved to Dittisham, Devon, on the River Dart; and then, after Lyte had regained some measure of his health, to the small parish of Charleton. On 19 October 1823, while in Charleton, Lyte preached the sermon "Without God in the World," which attracted the attention of George Canning, later briefly prime minister. In the sermon, Lyte compared the fates of men who lived for God or for the world in the face of approaching death. Skinner says the sermon demonstrates " a prominent 'hell-fire' note and was true to the tradition of Wesley and the Evangelical Revival" but with "a peculiar beauty about both the language and the content."

=== Brixham ===
About April 1824, Lyte left Charleton for Lower Brixham, a Devon fishing village. Almost immediately, Lyte joined the schools committee, and two months later he became its chairman. Also in 1824, Lyte established the first Sunday school in the Torbay area and created a Sailors' Sunday School. Although religious instruction was given there, the primary object of both was educating children and seamen for whom other schooling was virtually impossible. Each year Lyte organised an Annual Treat for the 800–1000 Sunday school children, which included a short religious service followed by tea and sports in the field.

Shortly after Lyte's arrival in Brixham, he attracted such large crowds that the church had to be enlarged—the resulting structure later described by his grandson as "a hideous barn-like building." Lyte added to his clerical income by taking resident pupils into his home, including the blind brother of Lord Robert Gascoyne-Cecil, later British prime minister. About 1830, Lyte made excavations at nearby Ash Hole Cavern, where he discovered pottery and human remains.

=== Character and personality ===
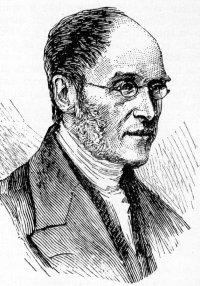
An older Lyte

Lyte was a tall and "unusually handsome" man, "slightly eccentric but of great personal charm, a man noted for his wit and human understanding, a born poet and an able scholar." He was an expert flute player and according to his great-grandson always had his flute with him. Lyte spoke Latin, Greek, and French; enjoyed discussing literature; and was knowledgeable about wild flowers. At Berry Head House, a former military hospital at Berry Head, Lyte built a library, largely of theology and old English poetry, described in his obituary as "one of the most extensive and valuable in the West of England".

Lyte was also able to identify with his parish of fishermen, visiting them at their homes and on board their ships in harbour, supplying every vessel with a Bible, and compiling songs and a manual of devotions for use at sea. In theology he was a conservative evangelical who believed that man's nature was totally corrupt. He frequently rose at 6 am and prayed for two or more hours before breakfast.

In politics, Lyte was a Conservative who feared revolt among the irreligious poor. He publicly opposed Catholic Emancipation by speaking against it in several Devon towns, stating that he preferred Catholics to be "emancipated from priests and from the power of the factious and turbulent demagogues of Ireland". A friend of Samuel Wilberforce, Lyte also opposed slavery, organising an 1833 petition to Parliament requesting it be abolished in Great Britain.

=== Decline and death ===
In poor health throughout his life, Lyte suffered various respiratory illnesses and often visited continental Europe in attempts to check their progress. In 1835 Lyte sought appointment as the vicar of Crediton but was rejected because of his increasingly debilitating asthma and bronchitis. In 1839, when only 46, Lyte wrote a poem entitled "Declining Days." Lyte also grew discouraged when numbers of his congregation (including in 1846, nearly his entire choir) left him for Dissenter congregations, especially the Plymouth Brethren, after Lyte expressed High Church sympathies and leaned towards the Oxford Movement.

By the 1840s, Lyte was spending much of his time in the warmer climates of France and Italy, making written suggestions about the conduct of his family's financial affairs after his death. When his daughter was married to his senior curate, Lyte did not perform the ceremony. Lyte complained of weakness and incessant coughing spasms, and he mentions medical treatments of blistering, bleeding, calomel, tartar emetic, and "large doses" of Prussic acid. Yet his friends found him buoyant, cheerful, and keenly interested in affairs of the Europe around him. One of his last publications was the first full volume of Welsh poet Henry Vaughan’s works since his death in 1695, with a thirty-eight-page biographical sketch trying to reverse the poet’s lack of recognition. Lyte spent the summer of 1847 at Berry Head then, after one final sermon to his congregation on the subject of the Holy Communion, he left again for Italy. He died on 20 November 1847 at the age of 54, in the city of Nice, at that time in the Kingdom of Sardinia, where he was buried. His last words were "Peace! Joy!"

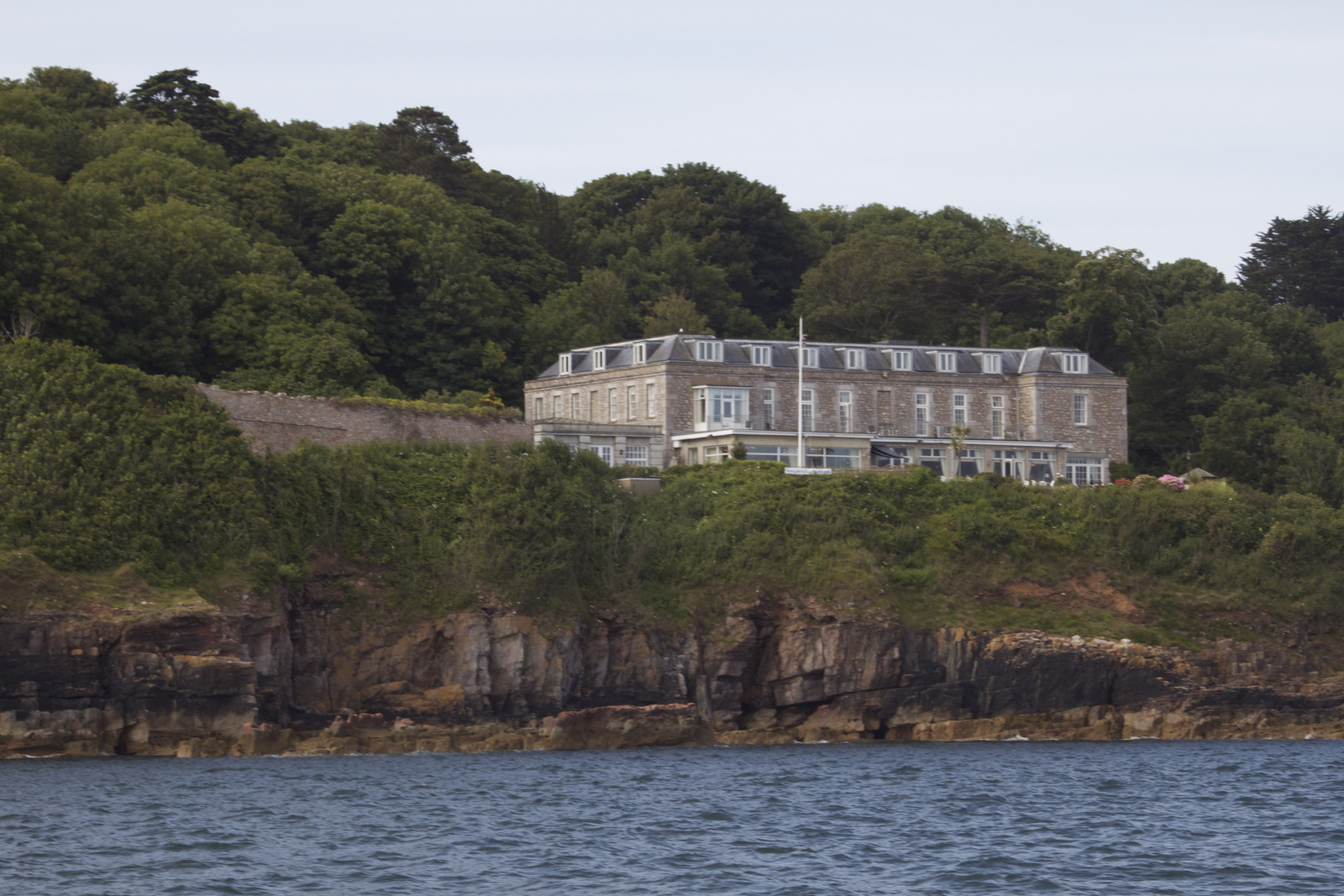
Berry Head Hotel, Lyte's ex-residence in Brixham

== Works ==
Lyte's first composition was Tales in Verse illustrative of Several of the Petitions in the Lord's Prayer (1826), written at Lymington and commended by John Wilson in the Noctes Ambrosianae. Lyte next published Poems, chiefly Religious (1833), and in 1834, a small collection of psalms and hymns entitled The Spirit of the Psalms. After his death, a volume of Remains (1850) with a memoir was issued, and the poems contained in this, with those in Poems, chiefly Religious, were afterward published in one volume (1868). Three of Lyte's best-known hymns are paraphrases of psalms, published in The Spirit of the Psalms: "Praise, my soul, the King of heaven" (Psalm 103), "God of Mercy, God of Grace" (Psalm 67), and "Pleasant are thy courts above" (Psalm 84).

Lyte's best known hymns are:

- Abide with me! fast falls the eventide
- Jesus, I my cross have taken
- Praise, my soul, the King of Heaven
- Pleasant are Thy courts above.

=== "Abide with Me" ===
"Abide with Me" is Lyte's best known hymn. According to the traditional story given in the Remains, Lyte wrote it a few hours after officiating the final service at his church, which was probably on 5 September 1847. More likely the hymn was actually written in July or August of that year.

Lyte himself created for the hymn what his biographer has disparaged as "a dull tune." When Hymns Ancient and Modern was published in 1861, the editor, William H. Monk—whose three-year-old daughter had just died—composed his own tune, "Eventide," for Lyte's poem.

The hymn became a favourite of Kings George V and George VI and was sung at the former's funeral. The hymn also inspired Field Marshal Herbert Kitchener and General Charles "Chinese" Gordon, and it was said to have been on the lips of Edith Cavell as she faced a German firing squad in 1915.

"Abide with Me" has been sung prior to kick-off at the FA Cup Final since 1927 when the association secretary substituted the hymn for the playing of "Alexander's Ragtime Band." In Rugby league, the hymn has been sung before the Challenge Cup final since 1929, the first year the match was staged at Wembley Stadium. The hymn was also played by the combined bands of the Indian Armed Forces during the annual Beating Retreat ceremony held on 29 January at Vijay Chowk, New Delhi, which officially marks the end of Republic Day celebrations but was dropped by Narendra Modi's government before the celebrations of Republic day events in the year 2022, citing its foreign origin not in agreement with India's ancient republican ideas. The hymn is the Portora Royal School, Enniskillen victory song and is sung at its remembrance service.

== Significance ==
Leon Litvack has written in the Oxford Dictionary of National Biography that although Lyte's "poetic energies were directed at scripturally and evangelically minded audiences, his lyric gift was universally appreciated. The example of ‘Abide with me’ is instructive: intensely personal and contemplative, yet nationally popular—even being sung (always, after its publication in 1861, to W. H. Monk's tune, ‘Eventide’) on secular occasions such as at football matches, and especially, since 1927, at the English cup final." The 20th-century hymnologist Erik Routley referred to the "much-loved H. R.[sic] Lyte" who "though scriptural and evangelical in his emphases, always writes good literature and is rarely deserted by an exquisite lyric gift. Perhaps the centrally 'romantic' hymn of all hymns is the intensely personal yet, as it has proved, wholly universal hymn, 'Abide with me.'"

== Bibliography ==
- Garland, Henry James (1957), Henry Francis Lyte and the Story of Abide With Me, Manchester, ENG, UK: Torch Publ. Co.
