= Simon Bailey (priest) =

British Anglican priest and writer

The Reverend Simon Bailey
- Born: 16 June 1955; Halifax, West Yorkshire, England
- Died: 27 November 1995 (aged 40); Dinnington, South Yorkshire, England
- Occupation: Anglican priest
- Political party: Labour

Simon Bailey (16 June 1955 – 27 November 1995) was a British Anglican priest and writer.

He came to national attention when a television documentary was made of how he continued his work in the parish after telling his Bishop and parishioners he had AIDS - the first British priest to do so.

== Childhood ==
Simon Bailey was born in Halifax, West Yorkshire, one of five children - Rosemary, Simon, Martin, Jacqueline, and Caroline. His father, the Reverend Walter Bailey, was a Baptist minister who combined conservative evangelical theological convictions with social radicalism. He bought his first television in order to be able to watch the funeral of Sir Winston Churchill in 1965. Walter Bailey supported the Campaign for Nuclear Disarmament and actually died while distributing leaflets for the Labour Party. The socialist historians E. P. Thompson and Dorothy Thompson as well as the writer J. B. Priestley were regular visitors to the family home in Halifax.

The family moved first to Birkenhead and then to Stoke-on-Trent, following Walter Bailey as he was called to different churches. Eventually he became so idiosyncratic that he ran his own church from home.

== Oxford and Cambridge ==
Simon Bailey continued his education at Regent's Park College, the Baptist permanent private hall of the University of Oxford, where he read English Language and Literature under John F. Kiteley (himself once the pupil of J. R. R. Tolkien). He gained a First Class degree.

Despite having chosen to study at the Baptist Regent's Park, Simon Bailey was by now unhappy in the Baptist tradition. He received the sacrament of confirmation in the Church of England, embracing Anglicanism as more "aesthetic and sensual".

After Oxford, Simon Bailey studied theology at Emmanuel College, Cambridge, and was influenced by the writer and religious philosopher Don Cupitt, Fellow and erstwhile Dean of the college. Bailey subsequently did his theological training for the Ministry at Westcott House, Cambridge.

== Norton ==
Simon Bailey's first experience of pastoral work was as a curate in the parish of Norton, Sheffield, where he stayed four years. Unusually, he chose to live not in the more middle-class suburb of Norton itself, but on a rough part of a council estate on the edge of the parish. In an article he wrote for The Guardian, he humorously described this experience. The then Bishop of Sheffield, David Lunn, put it in stronger terms:

"It was unspeakable, you picked over the lads demolishing their motorbikes in the corridor, the debris, the row going on outside, the unbelievable neighbours, the violence. then Simon’s flat was like going into a don’s room at Cambridge, elegant, beautiful, with lots of books. Simon maintained his distinctiveness and yet had a readiness to share that without any pretence he liked Top of the Pops or whatever, and they recognised in him his care for them. I don’t know if the parish ever recognised the significance of that ministry".

A major event for the parish and the wider community, conceived and executed by Simon Bailey, was a large-scale community venture involving the production and performance of a play written and directed by him. It built on the mediaeval tradition of mystery and miracle plays, and was performed with dancing, acting and music in the churchyard of the ancient parish church of St. James. The play, "Chad. A Miracle Play for Norton" was written largely in blank verse.

The Miracle Play, performed on 1–6 July 1985, was a contribution to Sheffield's Year of Mission in 1984–5. This year had also involved a mission by the American evangelist Billy Graham and Bailey sought to offer an alternative to the individualism stressed in evangelical Christianity.

"The play… is an attempt to… concentrate on faith as fullness of life, as community, and as deepened spirituality rather than on personal "salvation".

Therefore, he involved people from the wider community in the project and performance, including the local schools. In fact the cast alone came to more than 100 people. The play's narrative is an imaginary depiction of how Chad and his followers attempted to bring Christianity to the region in the 7th century.

== Dinnington ==
Simon Bailey was inducted as Rector of St. Leonard's parish church, Dinnington in South Yorkshire on 20 December 1985. Dinnington was a South Yorkshire mining community, whose colliery closed in 1991.

Simon Bailey was a gay man and contracted HIV from a sexual partner. He learned that he had the virus only a month before his induction as Rector of Dinnington. For several years he worked in the parish without obvious symptoms, but when he became too unwell to conceal his condition from the people around him he informed the diocesan authorities and from 1992 on, gradually introduced the news to his own parishioners.

Though not the only Anglican priest at that time to be HIV-positive, and eventually to develop AIDS, he was the first to stay in parish ministry, continuing to celebrate the Eucharist until only a few weeks before his death. One of the most remarkable features of his time at Dinnington was the love and care that he received from his parishioners.

== National publicity ==
Simon Bailey became well known to a wider public as a result of a BBC Everyman documentary programme, Simon's Cross, which was broadcast on 15 January 1995. His sister Rosemary Bailey wrote a lengthy article for the Independent on Sunday ("A Parish Learns to be Positive"), which was published on the same day. The making of the programme led to Rosemary writing the biography, Scarlet Ribbons: A Priest with AIDS. A new edition was published in 2017 to considerable acclaim including the BBC Radio 4 broadcast A priest with AIDS on 23 July 2017.

== Writing ==
Simon Bailey wrote a biographical study of the liturgical scholar Gregory Dix, A Tactful God: Gregory Dix: Priest, Monk and Scholar (Leominster: Gracewing, 1995. ISBN 0-85244-340-4).

He also wrote pastoral works,

- Stations: places for pilgrims to pray (Sheffield: Cairns Publications, 1991. ISBN 1-870652-12-6)
- Still with God: a new way of praying (London: National Society, Church House, 1986. ISBN 0-7151-4828-1. Revised edition: 1993)
- The well within: parables for living and dying (London: Darton, Longman and Todd, 1996)

His biography, Scarlet Ribbons: A Priest with AIDS (see above) contains extracts from his unpublished writings. These hint at considerable literary gifts and it is to be hoped that a full publication will appear eventually.

== Interests, influences and causes ==
Simon Bailey's literary influences were varied. He was particularly interested in the poetry of R. S. Thomas and of John Milton, whose blindness Bailey identified with his own illnesses. He himself acknowledged that the Miracle Play he wrote for Norton owed a debt to Christopher Fry.

There was an overlap between his interest in drama and his interest in liturgy. In one article he wrote for the journal Theology, he drew a comparison between the role of the priest and actors and stressed the importance of the theatrical dimension, celebrating the symbols:

“… the symbols are the only way in. It is rediscovering the Story, the Myth, reawakening it, drawing life from it, discovering it alive in our midst to invigorate us, right in the middle of the community".

His spirituality was very much inspired by Celtic Christianity, its holy places and saints. Among the sacred places most important to him was the small island of Bardsey, off the coast of Wales, which had been a great centre of pilgrimage in the Middle Ages. It became a place he returned to often. He also acquired a significant collection of icons.

Bailey was a strong advocate of women priests and an active member of the Ministry for the Ordination of Women (MOW). He also became involved in the Campaign for Nuclear Disarmament.
