= Barry Miles =

English author (born 1943)

- Born: 21 February 1943 (age 83); Cirencester, Gloucestershire, England
- Other name: Miles
- Education: Cirencester Grammar School; Gloucestershire College of Art; University of London
- Occupation: Author
- Spouse(s): Sue Miles; Rosemary Bailey
- Website: barrymiles.co.uk

Barry Miles (born 21 February 1943) is an English author known for his participation in and writing on the subjects of the 1960s London underground and counterculture. He is the author of numerous books and his work has also regularly appeared in newspapers such as The Guardian. In the 1960s, he was co-owner of the Indica Gallery and helped start the independent newspaper International Times.

== Early life ==
The son of Albert and May Miles, the young Miles was educated at Cirencester Grammar School, Gloucestershire College of Art (NDD, 1963), and the University of London (ATD, 1964).

== Career ==
In the 1960s, Miles worked at Better Books, which was managed by Tony Godwin. Godwin was friends with Lawrence Ferlinghetti, with whom he would exchange Penguin books for City Lights publications. In 1965, Allen Ginsberg gave a reading at Better Books that led to the International Poetry Incarnation, a seminal event co-organised by Miles.

In 1965, Miles and his wife, the former Susan Crane, introduced Paul McCartney to hash brownies by using a recipe for hash fudge that they had found in The Alice B. Toklas Cookbook.

Following the International Poetry Incarnation, Miles established the Indica Gallery and Bookshop, allowing him to meet many of the stars of the Swinging London social scene. Miles brought McCartney into contact with people who wanted to start International Times, which McCartney helped to fund.

With John Hopkins and Dave Howson, Miles organised The 14 Hour Technicolor Dream, a concert on 29 April 1967 at Alexandra Palace to raise funds for International Times. It was a multi-artist event, featuring poets, artists and musicians. Pink Floyd headlined the event; other artists included Yoko Ono, Arthur Brown, jazz-rock group Soft Machine, Tomorrow and The Pretty Things.

Miles became the de facto manager of the Apple's short-lived Zapple Records label in 1969. While temporarily living in California, Miles produced an album of poetry readings by Richard Brautigan entitled Listening to Richard Brautigan for Zapple. Miles's friendship with Brautigan ended when Miles became involved in an affair with Brautigan's girlfriend Valerie Estes. By the time the album was completed, Miles and Brautigan communicated only through their lawyers. Zapple was closed before it could release the Brautigan album, but it was eventually released in 1970 by the U.S. division of Harvest Records.

Miles also produced Ginsberg's Songs of Innocence and Experience LP, recorded in 1969 and released the following year. In 1970, Miles moved with his wife to rural New York state, where he lived with Ginsberg on his farm. However, Miles's marriage soon ended and he returned to England. Miles currently lives in London and was married to travel writer Rosemary Bailey, who died in 2019.

Miles's book Hippie (2004) is a reminiscence of the hippie sub-culture of the 1960s and early 1970s, with interviews, quotes, and images. He co-wrote I Want to Take You Higher (documenting the Rock and Roll Hall of Fame and Museum exhibit by the same name) with Charles Perry and James Henke.

Miles wrote Paul McCartney's official biography, Many Years from Now (1998). Miles has also written biographies of Frank Zappa, John Lennon, William S. Burroughs, Jack Kerouac, Charles Bukowski and Ginsberg, in addition to books on The Beatles, Pink Floyd and The Clash, as well as a definitive history of London's counterculture since 1945, London Calling.

== Politics ==
In March 1978, Miles wrote an article critical of the band Rush and its drummer Neil Peart, which contentiously labeled the band as right-wing. The article, published in the UK's New Musical Express, took exception to Peart's advocacy of the objectivist philosophy of Ayn Rand. Peart had described the Sex Pistols as products of a "socialist" state. Miles described Rand (a Russian anti-communist who had become an American citizen) as an "ultra right-wing American". Miles focused on Peart's politics and criticised the band's perceived aloofness and libertarian rhetoric. (Peart would subsequently leave Randism behind in favour of a more humanistic approach, and would ultimately define himself as a "left-libertarian".)

In a 2005 biography of Frank Zappa, Miles criticised Zappa regarding his business-orientated approach to art and complaints about inefficient labour union regulations. Zappa frequently described himself as "a devout capitalist" and attempted to broker joint commercial ventures with business interests in the former Soviet Union following the end of the Cold War in 1991.

== Works ==
- Miles and Pearce Marchbank, The Illustrated Rock Almanac (1977), Paddington Press
- Bob Dylan (1978), Big O Publishing
- Bob Dylan in His Own Words (1978), edited by Pearce Marchbank, Omnibus Press
- Beatles in Their Own Words (1978, compiler), edited by Pearce Marchbank, Omnibus Press
- Bowie in His Own Words (1980, compiler), Omnibus Press
- John Lennon in His Own Words (1980, compiler), Omnibus Press
- David Bowie Black Book (1980), Omnibus Press
- Pink Floyd: A Visual Documentary. Omnibus Press. 1980. ISBN 978-0-8256-3948-7.
- Pink Floyd: A Visual Documentary (1981 revised edition, and 1988 as 21st anniversary edition), Omnibus Press
- The Beatles: An Illustrated Discography (1981), Omnibus Press
- The Jam (1981), Omnibus Press
- The Pretenders (1981), Omnibus Press
- The Ramones: An Illustrated Biography (1981), Omnibus Press
- Talking Heads (1981), Omnibus Press
- Miles; Tobler, John (1981). The Clash. Omnibus Press.
- Pink Floyd: The Illustrated Discography (1981), Omnibus Press
- The Rolling Stones: An Illustrated Discography. Omnibus Press. 1982. ISBN 978-0-86001-762-2.
- Mick Jagger in His Own Words (1982, compiler), Omnibus Press
- Tobler, John; Miles (1983). The Clash: A Visual Documentary. Omnibus Press. ISBN 9780711902886.
- Miles; Charlesworth, Chris (1984). David Bowie Black Book. Omnibus Press. ISBN 978-0-86001-808-7.
- Pink Floyd: Another Brick: The Illustrated Pink Floyd Story (1984), Omnibus Press
- The Police: A Visual Documentary. Omnibus Press. 1984. ISBN 978-0-86001-801-8.
- Miles; Charlesworth, Chris. (1988). David Bowie Black Book: The Illustrated Biography.
- Ginsberg: A Biography. Viking. 1989. ISBN 978-0-670-82683-4.
- Miles; Tobler, John; Pachy, Mal (1992). The Clash: The New Visual Documentary. Omnibus Press.
- William Burroughs: El Hombre Invisible: A Portrait. Hyperion. 1993. ISBN 978-1-56282-848-6.
- Frank Zappa in His Own Words (1993, compiler), Omnibus Press
- Frank Zappa: A Visual Documentary (1993), Omnibus Press
- The Rolling Stones: A Visual Documentary (1994), Omnibus Press
- Miles; Mabbett, Andy (1994). Pink Floyd: A Visual Documentary. ISBN 0-7119-4109-2.
- William S. Burroughs. Head Farm - Edition Kelln. 1994. ISBN 978-3-933444-11-0.
- Many Years From Now. Vintage-Random House. 1997. ISBN 0-7493-8658-4.
- The Beatles: A Diary: An Intimate Day by Day History. Omnibus Press. 1998. ISBN 978-0-7119-6315-3.
- Jack Kerouac: King of the Beats: A Portrait. Grove Press. 2001.
- The Beat Hotel: Ginsberg, Burroughs, and Corso in Paris, 1958-1963. Grove Press. 2001. ISBN 978-0-8021-3817-0.
- In the Sixties. Pimlico. 2003. ISBN 978-0-7126-8998-4.
- Hippie. Cassell. 2004. ISBN 1-84403-269-8.
- Zappa: A Biography. Grove Press. 2005. ISBN 978-0-8021-4215-3.
- Charles Bukowski. Virgin. 2005. ISBN 978-1-85227-271-5.
- The Beat Collection. Virgin. 2005. ISBN 978-1-85227-264-7.
- Miles, Barry (2008). Peace: 50 Years of Protest, 1958-2008. Anova Books. ISBN 978-1-84340-457-6.
- The British Invasion: The Music, the Times, the Era. Sterling. 2009. ISBN 978-1-4027-6976-4.
- London Calling: A Countercultural History of London Since 1945. Atlantic Books. 2010. ISBN 978-1-84354-613-9.
- In the Seventies: Adventures in the counterculture. Serpent's Tail. 2011. ISBN 978-1-84668-690-0.
- William S. Burroughs: A Life. Weidenfeld & Nicolson. 2014. ISBN 978-0-2978-6725-8.
- The Zapple Diaries. Peter Owen Publishers. 2015. ISBN 978-0-7206-1860-0.
