= John Maxwell (archdeacon of Clogher) =

The Ven. John Maxwell, D.D. was Archdeacon of Clogher from 1762 until 1783.

The grandson of Bishop Robert Maxwell, he was born in Faulkland and educated at Trinity College, Dublin. After curacies in Dublin and Clontibret he held incumbencies at Donagh, Aughnamullan, Rossory and Drummully.

He was the father of William Maxwell.

== Notes ==
Church of Ireland titles
Preceded by John Cranston	Archdeacon of Clogher; 1762–1783	Succeeded by John Jackson
