= Bernard Lyot Telescope =

Reflector Telescope

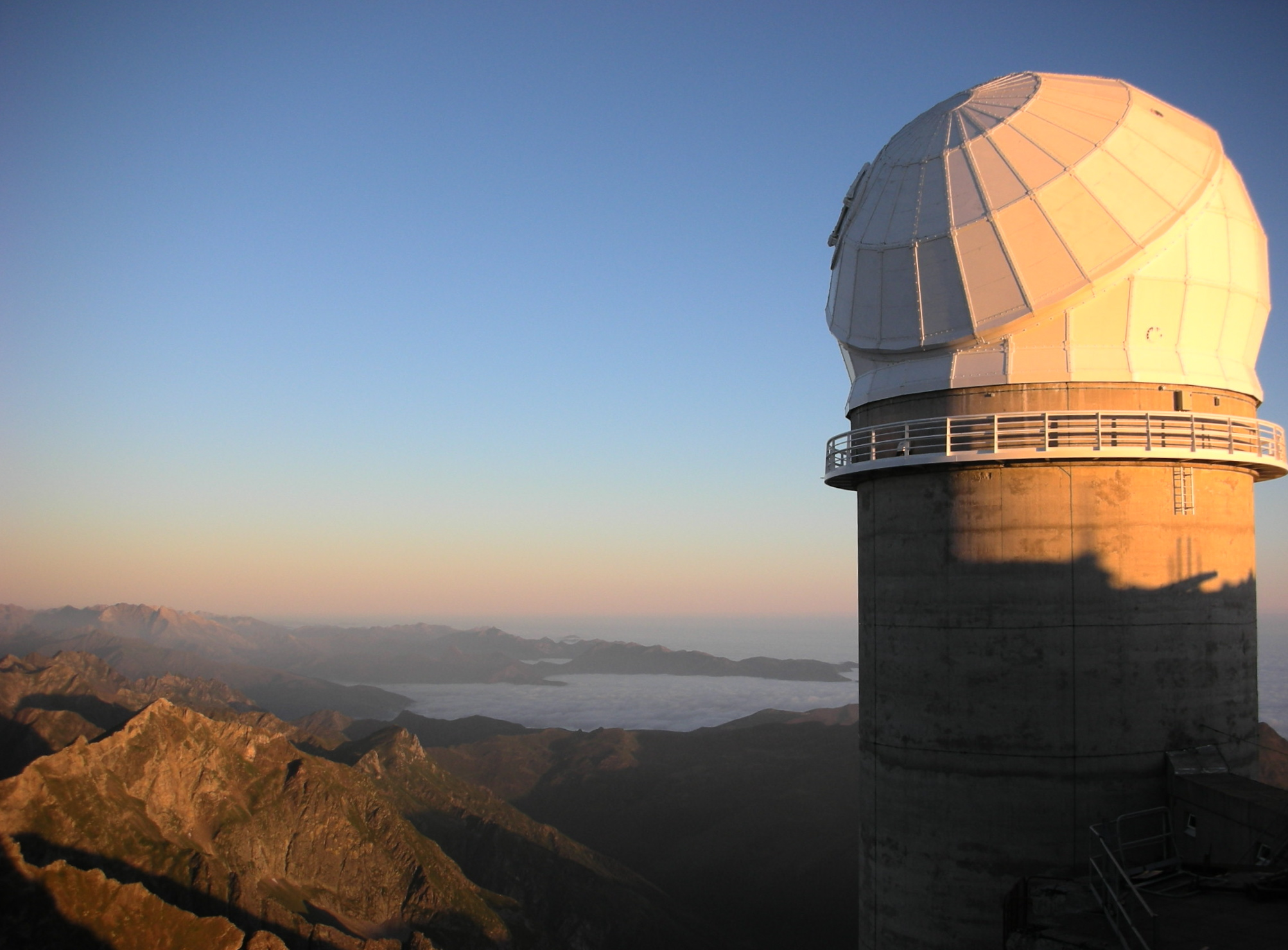
- Bernard Lyot at sunrise
- Alternative names: TBL
- Location(s): France
- Coordinates: 42°54′47″N 0°11′48″W
- Altitude: 2,877 m (9,439 ft)
- Diameter: 2 m (6 ft 7 in)
- Website: www.tbl.obs-mip.fr
- Location of Bernard Lyot Telescope
- Related media on Commons

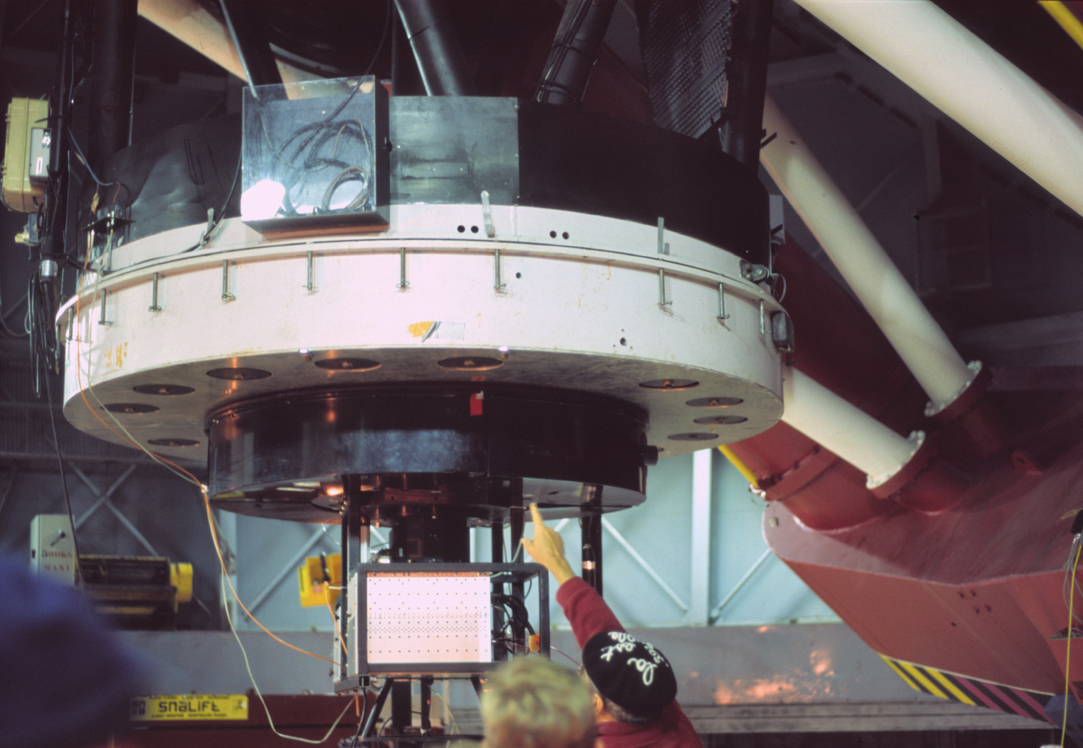
Underneath mirror inside

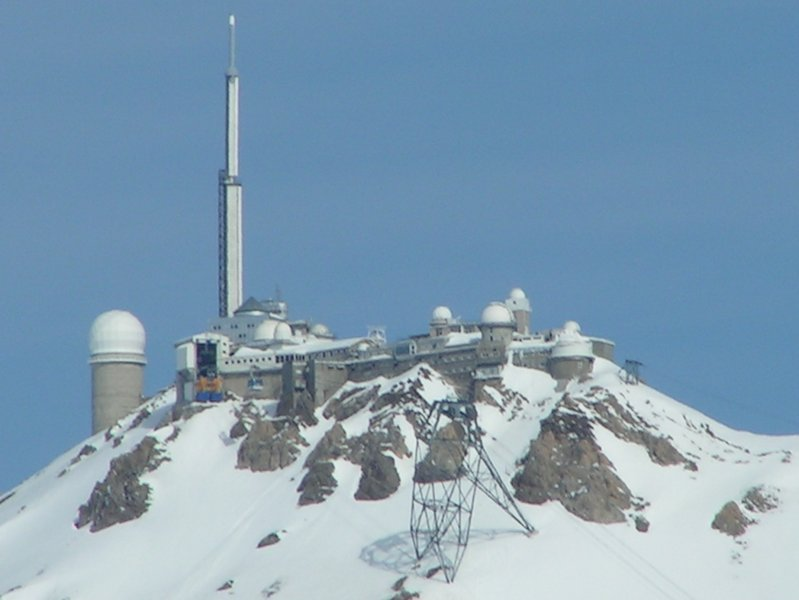
Pic du Midi de Bigorre Observatory, with the Bernard Lyot on the far left

The Bernard Lyot Telescope (Téléscope Bernard Lyot, or TBL) is a 2-meter Cassegrain telescope operating in the visible domain since 1980. It is located at an elevation of 2,877 meters on the Pic du Midi in the French Pyrenees. Since 2007, the Bernard Lyot Telescope has housed an echelle spectropolarimeter, NARVAL, which allows astronomers to probe stellar magnetic fields with exquisite sensitivity.

== See also ==
- Observatoire Midi-Pyrénées
- List of largest optical telescopes in the 20th century
