= Société Ramond =

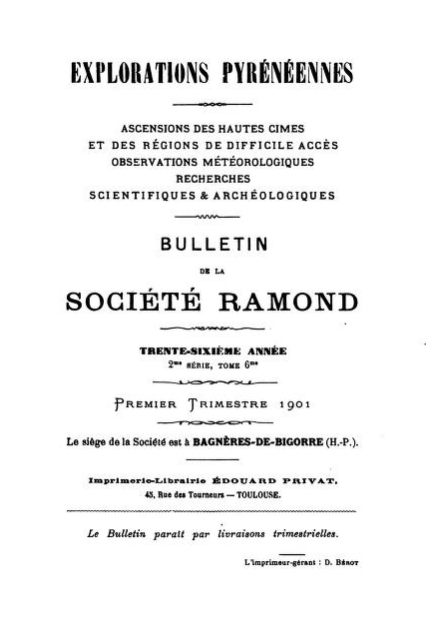
Title page of Explorations pyrénéennes, 2nd series, vol. 6, 1901

The Société Ramond is a French learned society devoted to the study of the Pyrenees mountain range that forms a natural border between France and Spain. It is named after the French politician, geologist, botanist and explorer Louis Ramond de Carbonnières and is based in Bagnères-de-Bigorre in southwestern France.

== Founding ==
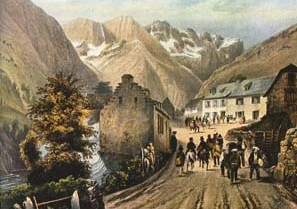
L'Hôtel des Voyageurs in Gavarnie, where the idea for the society was first mooted

The society was formed in 1865 (although 1864 is also given as its founding date) in Bagnères-de-Bigorre by Henry Russell (1834–1909), a French-Irish eccentric who made many first ascents in the Pyrenees; Émilien Frossard (1829–1898); and Charles Packe (1826–1896).

Their first meeting, at which Frossard (with his two sons Charles and Emilien-Sigismond), Packe and Russell came up with the idea for a society to be modelled on the recently formed Alpine Club in London (1857), was on 19 August 1864 at l’Hôtel des Voyageurs in Gavarnie. Two weeks later at Frossard's house in Bagnères-de-Bigorre, with Farnham Maxwell-Lyte in attendance, the society may be said to have been formed. At this meeting, Russell, a keen mountaineer and along with Packe and Maxwell-Lyte a member of the Alpine Club, argued that all candidates for membership should have climbed at least one Pyrenean peak of three thousand metres or more. Frossard replied that the society was aiming for a large-scale study of the mountain range and not mere acrobatics.

The issue of the society's name was the next subject to be broached. Russell, perhaps still angling for a sporting focus, suggested Le club des isards (the Chamois club). Again Froissard demurred. The society wanted to distinguish itself from traditional academic societies, while still being devoted primarily to the scientific and ethnographic study of the Pyrenees and to the dissemination of knowledge. Ramond, according to Froissard, had excelled in these disciplines and was the best symbol for the new society. This time all were agreed, and so the club was named. The composition of the society's first committee was: Frossard, president; Maxwell-Lyte, vice-president; Russell, secretary; Packe, assistant secretary. Among its earliest members were the geographer Élisée Reclus and the chemist Henry Holy-Claire Deville.

== Achievements ==
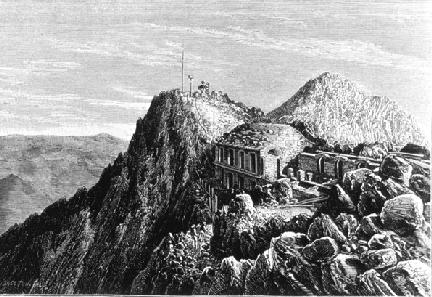
Members of the Société Ramond lay the first stone of the Pic du Midi Observatory in 1878 (artist unknown).

The society started publishing a trimestrial bulletin in the first half of 1866 entitled Explorations pyrénéennes, in which its most eminent members put forth their theories and reported on the fruits of the research. Amongst its early contributors were some of the great names of pyrénéism, such as Baysselance, Briet, Cordier, Gourdon, Lequeutre, Packe, Russell, Saint Saud and Wallon.

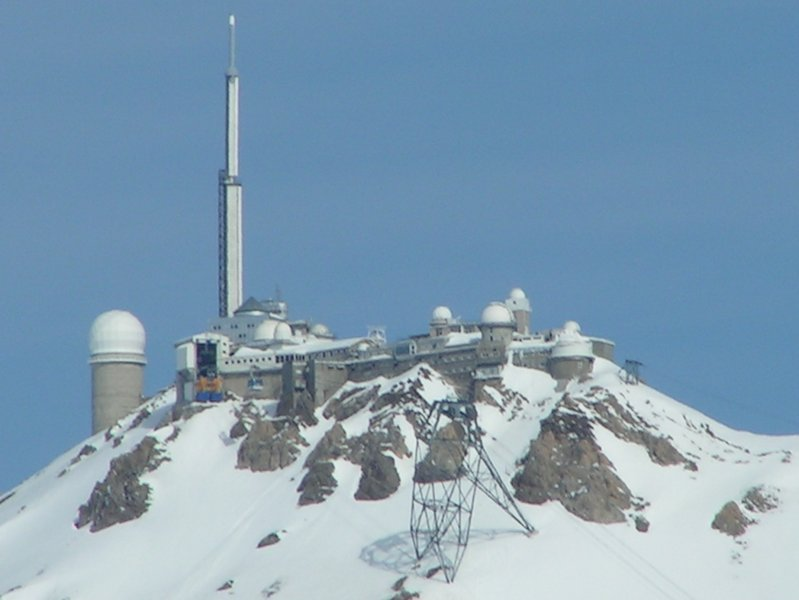
The observatory on the Pic du Midi de Bigorre

In 1874, the society was given the role of enlarging the collection of the natural history museum in the thermal baths of Bagnères-of-Bigorre (created in 1837) and to have an active role in its management. Frossard contributed specimens in mineralogy, palaeontology and prehistory.

It was also responsible for the construction of an observatory on the Pic du Midi de Bigorre. This was the idea of a Dr Costallat; Frossard and J. J. Dumoret went to Paris to try and drum up funds from the government, while the commune of Bagnères, directed by Dumoret, as well as giving funds also gave the grounds necessary to the observatory.

The Société Ramond put all of its funds towards the project, and organised a subscription from its members. The first stones of the observatory were laid in 1878, but by 1882, as a result of spiralling costs that were beyond its relatively modest means, the society yielded the observatory to the French state, which gained possession by a law of 7 August 1882.

The First World War slowed down the activities of the society, although it still continued to publish Explorations pyrénéennes. The bulletin ceased publication around the Second World War and it was only in 1968 that it was again published.

== Gallery ==
Louis Ramond de Carbonnières and the four founding members of the Société Ramond

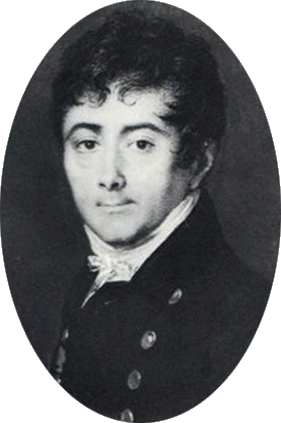
Louis Ramond de Carbonnières

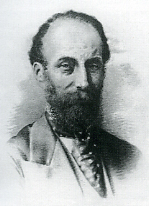
Charles Packe
(assistant secretary)

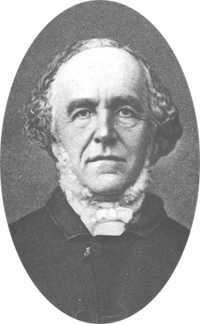
Émilien Frossard
(president)

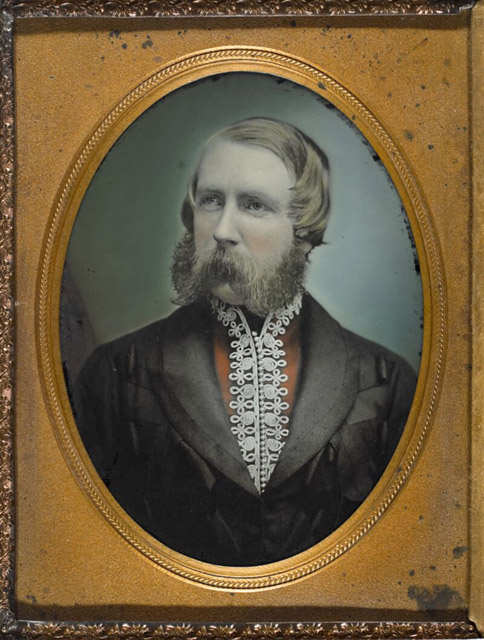
Farnham Maxwell-Lyte
(vice-president)
