= Scarlet Ribbons: A Priest with AIDS =

Biography of Simon Bailey by Rosemary Bailey

Scarlet Ribbons: A Priest with AIDS is a biography written by Rosemary Bailey about the life of her brother, Simon Bailey who was an Anglican priest and writer.

Simon Bailey became more known to the public after the airing of a BBC Everyman documentary programme, called Simon's Cross. The documentary aired on 15 January 1995. After the broadcast his sister, Rosemary Bailey wrote an article for The Independent called A Parish Learns to be Positive. Subsequently after the documentary and article Rosemary Bailey wrote her brother's biography, Scarlet Ribbons: A Priest with AIDS.
