= John Cranston (priest) =

Irish priest (1687–1762)

The Ven. John Cranston, D.D. was Archdeacon of Clogher from 1718 until his death in November 1762.

Cranston was born in County Tyrone in 1687; and educated at Trinity College, Dublin. He was Prebendary of Tyholland at St Macartan's Cathedral, Clogher from 1716 to 1718; and Rector of Tydavnet from 1720 to 1762.

== Notes ==
Church of Ireland titles
Preceded by William Gore	Archdeacon of Clogher; 1718–1762	Succeeded by John Maxwell
