= Rosemary Bailey (author) =

British writer (1953–2019)

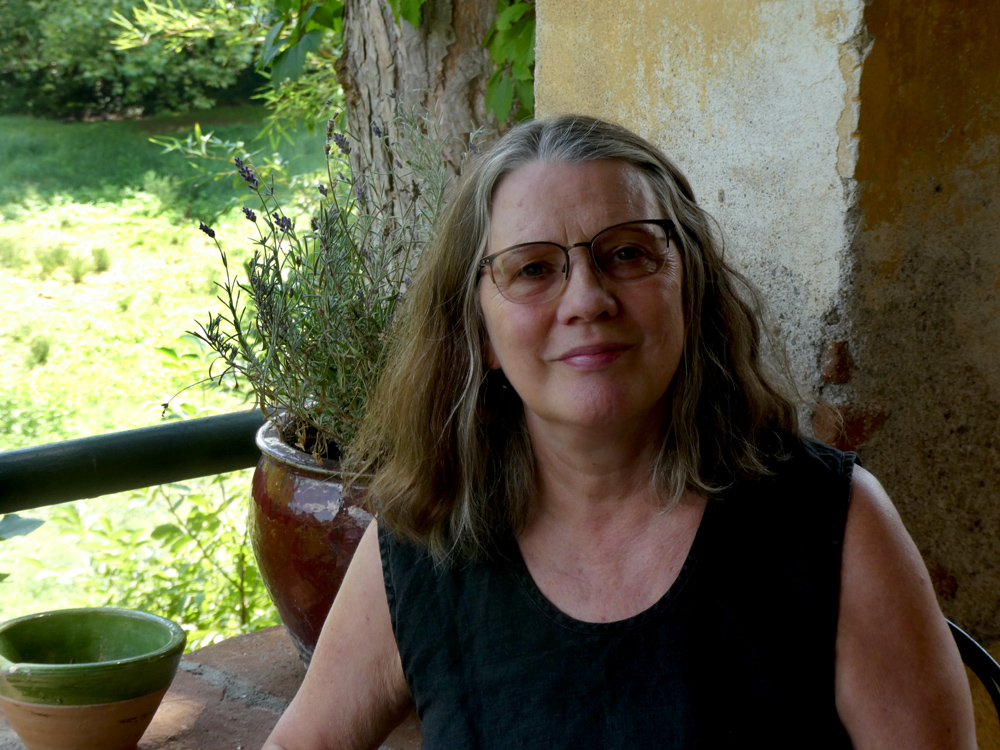
- Born: 1953; Halifax, Yorkshire, England
- Died: 20 March 2019 (aged 65–66); London, England
- Notable work: Books about France. Life in a Postcard, The Man who Married a Mountain and Love and War in the Pyrenees
- Spouse: Barry Miles
- Website: www.rosemarybailey.com

Rosemary Bailey (1953 – 20 March 2019) was a British writer. She writes travel memoirs about France. In 2008 Bailey won the British Guild of Travel Writers' award for best narrative travel book, Love and War in the Pyrenees.

== Early life and education ==
Bailey was born in Halifax, West Riding of Yorkshire in 1953, daughter of the Baptist minister Rev Walter Bailey. In 1959 the family moved to Birkenhead, near Liverpool, and then to Newcastle-under-Lyme where she attended Clayton Hall Grammar School. She then attended the University of Bristol, taking a degree in English and Philosophy. Rosemary Bailey is a member of the British Guild of Travel Writers, the Society of Authors and a Fellow of the Royal Literary Fund.

== Career ==
After a year on a farm in Somerset, Bailey moved to London as a researcher with The Daily Telegraph Information Service, then spent three years training as journalist with Haymarket Publications on Engineering Today. She followed that by several years as a freelance journalist in London and New York City, writing about travel, women's issues, food, fashion and literary matters for The Guardian, The Sunday Times, The Independent, Elle, Vogue and others. She has edited and written travel guides to New York, Italy, but mainly France, for Time Out, Insight Guides, Dorling Kindersley and National Geographic Traveler.

In 1997 Bailey published Scarlet Ribbons: A Priest with Aids, the story of her brother, Rev Simon Bailey, an Anglican priest, who remained supported in his Yorkshire parish of Dinnington until he died in 1995. A new edition of Scarlet Ribbons was published in 2017 to considerable acclaim, including the BBC Radio 4 broadcast A priest with AIDS. on 23 July 2017. Between 1997 and 2005 Bailey was based mainly in Southern France, as described in her second book, Life in a Postcard.

Subsequent books explored the Pyrenees further, The Man who Married a Mountain (2005) about a 19th-century mountaineer, Sir Henry Russell-Killough, and the award-winning Love and War in the Pyrenees about World War II in the region, Camp de Rivesaltes, described by The Jewish Chronicle as "a quiet triumph of historical reconstruction."

== Later career ==
Bailey was a writing tutor for the Arvon Foundation, a contributor to Jewish Book Week and between 2010-2012 and 2014-2015 a Fellow of the Royal Literary Fund at Queen Mary University of London.

== Personal life and death ==
Bailey was married to author Barry Miles, and they had one son. She died in London on 20 March 2019. She had been suffering from leukaemia for several years prior to her death.

== Publications ==
=== Books ===
- Scarlet Ribbons: A Priest with Aids. Serpent's Tail. 1997. ISBN 1-85242-521-0.
- Life in a Postcard: Escape to the French Pyrenees. Transworld Publishers. 2002. ISBN 0553813412.
- The Man Who Married a Mountain. Transworld Publishers. 2005. ISBN 0-553-81523-7.
- Love and War in the Pyrenees. Weidenfeld & Nicolson. 2008. ISBN 978-0753825914.
- The Arvon Book of Literary Non-fiction (contributor). Bloomsbury Publishing. 2012. ISBN 978-1408131237.
- Scarlet Ribbons: A Priest with Aids. Jorvik Press. 2017. ISBN 978-0-9863770-3-7.

=== Travel guides ===
- Dorling Kindersley Eyewitness Guide to France. (Editor and contributor)
- Insight Guides to Tuscany, the Loire Valley, Burgundy, the Côte d'Azur and Southwest France (Editor and contributor)
- National Geographic Traveler Guide to France. (Author)
- Time Out (magazine) Guide to South of France. (contributor)

== Awards ==
- British Guild of Travel Writers' award for best narrative travel book 2008. (Love and War in the Pyrenees)
- British Guild of Travel Writers award for best European travel article 2006.
- ABTOF (Association of Tour Operators to France) award for best travel article 2008.
- Awarded grant from Francis Head Bequest 2006
