= Pic du Midi de Bigorre =

Mountain in the French Pyrenees

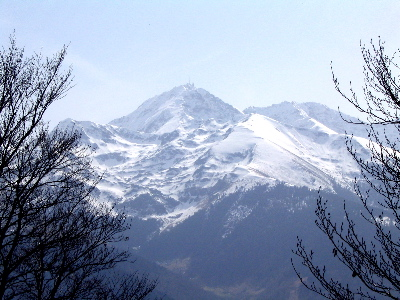

Highest point
- Elevation: 2,877 m (9,439 ft)
- Prominence: 761 m (2,497 ft)
- Isolation: 11.23 km (6.98 mi)
- Coordinates: 42°56′11″N 0°08′34″E

Geography
- Location within Pyrenees
- Location: Hautes-Pyrénées, France
- Parent range: Pyrenees

The Pic du Midi de Bigorre (Occitan: Pica del Mèdia de Bigòrra) or simply the Pic du Midi (elevation 2,877 m (9,439 ft)) is a mountain in the French Pyrenees. It is the site of the Pic du Midi Observatory.

== Pic du Midi Observatory ==
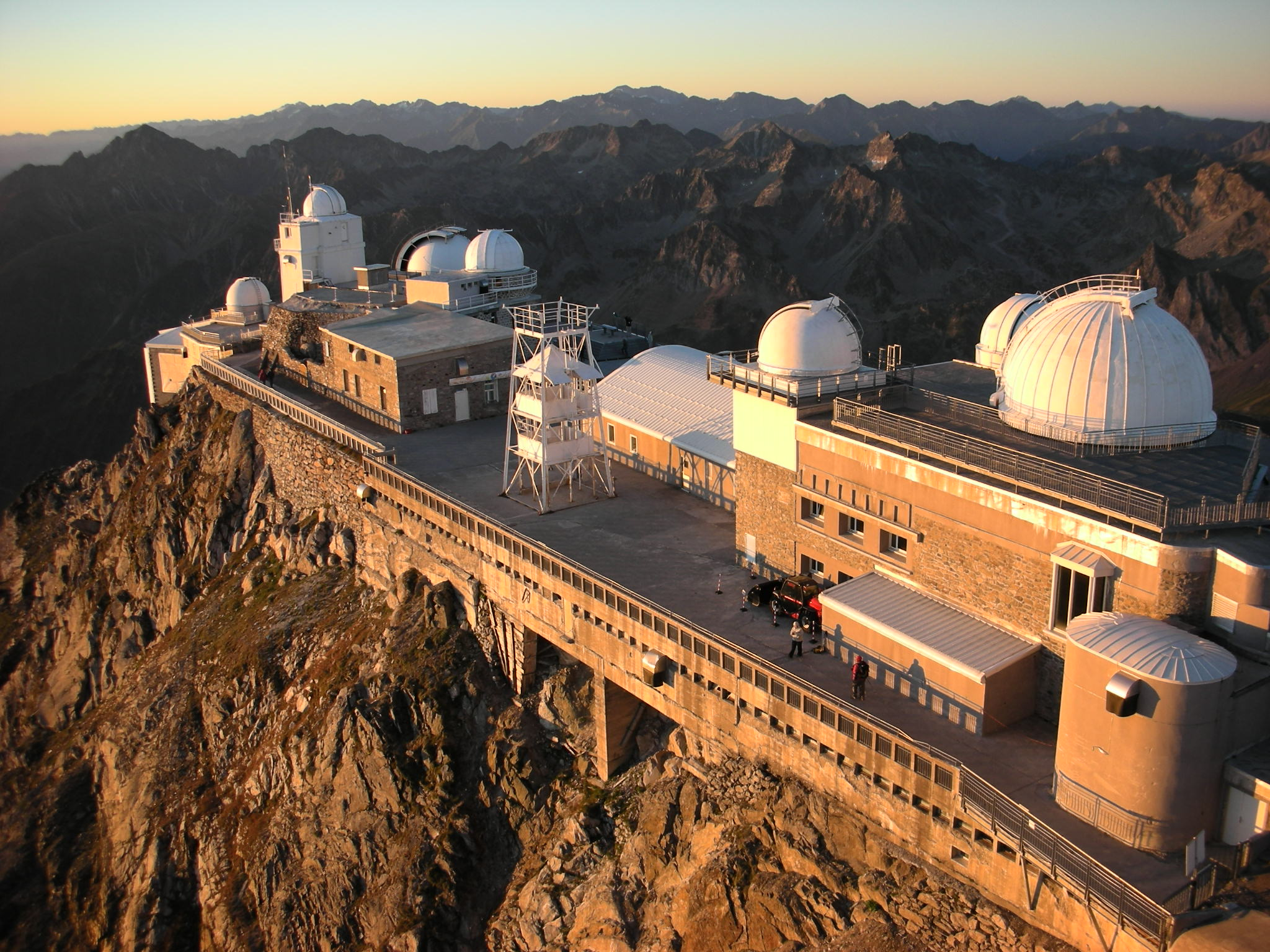
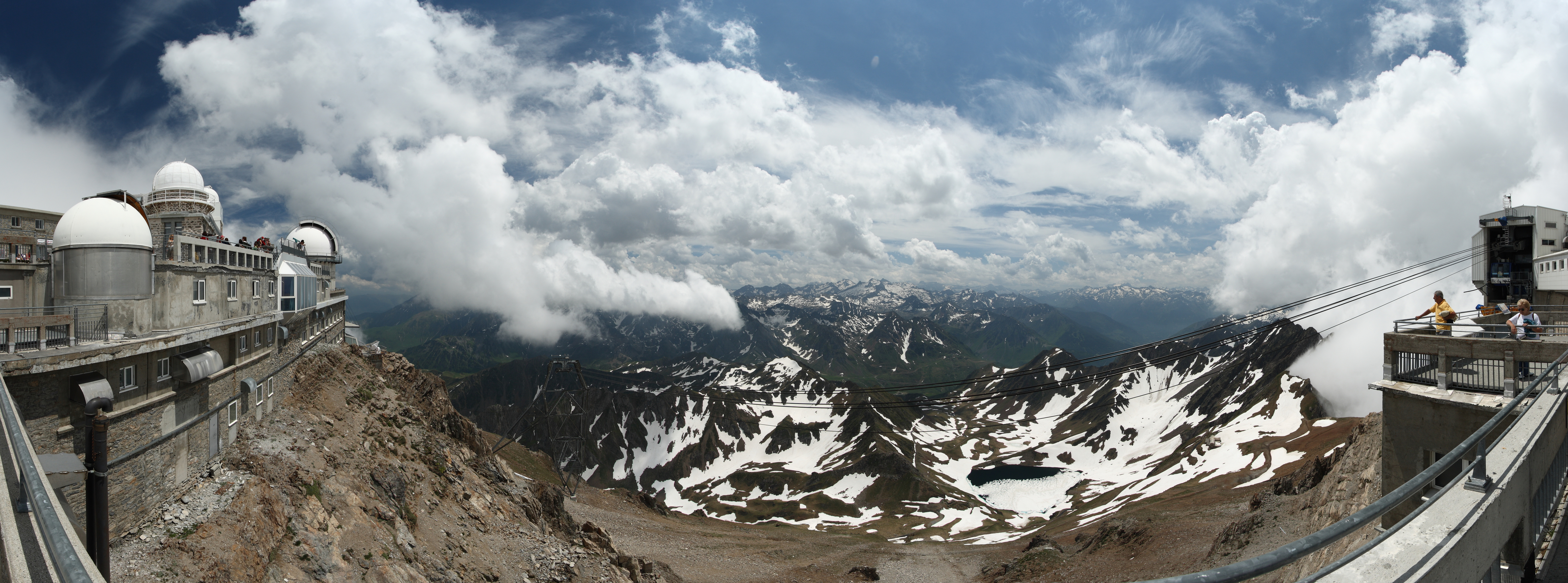
The Pic du Midi Observatory at 2,870 m (9,420 ft) in the Pyrenees in the south of France

Minor planets discovered: 9
see § List of discovered minor planets

The Pic du Midi Observatory (French: Observatoire du Pic du Midi) is an astronomical observatory located at 2,877 meters on top of the Pic du Midi de Bigorre in the French Pyrenees. It is part of the Observatoire Midi-Pyrénées (OMP) which has additional research stations in the southwestern French towns of Tarbes, Lannemezan, and Auch, as well as many partnerships in South America, Africa, and Asia, due to the guardianship it receives from the French Research Institute for Development (IRD).

Construction of the observatory began in 1878 under the auspices of the Société Ramond, but by 1882 the society decided that the spiralling costs were beyond its relatively modest means, and yielded the observatory to the French state, which took it into its possession by a law of 7 August 1882. The 8 metre dome was completed in 1908, under the ambitious direction of Benjamin Baillaud. It housed a powerful mechanical equatorial reflector which was used in 1909 to formally discredit the Martian canal theory. In 1946 Mr. Gentilli funded a dome and a 0.60-meter telescope, and in 1958, a spectrograph was installed.

A 1.06-meter (42-inch) telescope was installed in 1963, funded by NASA and was used to take detailed photographs of the surface of the Moon in preparation for the Apollo missions. In 1965 the astronomers Pierre and Janine Connes were able to formulate a detailed analysis of the composition of the atmospheres on Mars and Venus, based on the infrared spectra gathered from these planets. The results showed atmospheres in chemical equilibrium. This analysis led James Lovelock, a scientist working for the Jet Propulsion Laboratory in California, to conclude that neither Mars nor Venus had life.

The 2-metre Bernard Lyot Telescope was placed at the observatory in 1980 on top of a 28-meter column built off to the side to avoid wind turbulence affecting the seeing of the other telescopes. It is the largest telescope in France. The observatory also has a coronagraph, which is used to study the solar corona. A 0.60-meter telescope (the Gentilly's T60 telescope) is also located at the top of Pic du Midi. Since 1982 this T60 is dedicated to amateur astronomy and managed by a group of amateurs, called association T60.

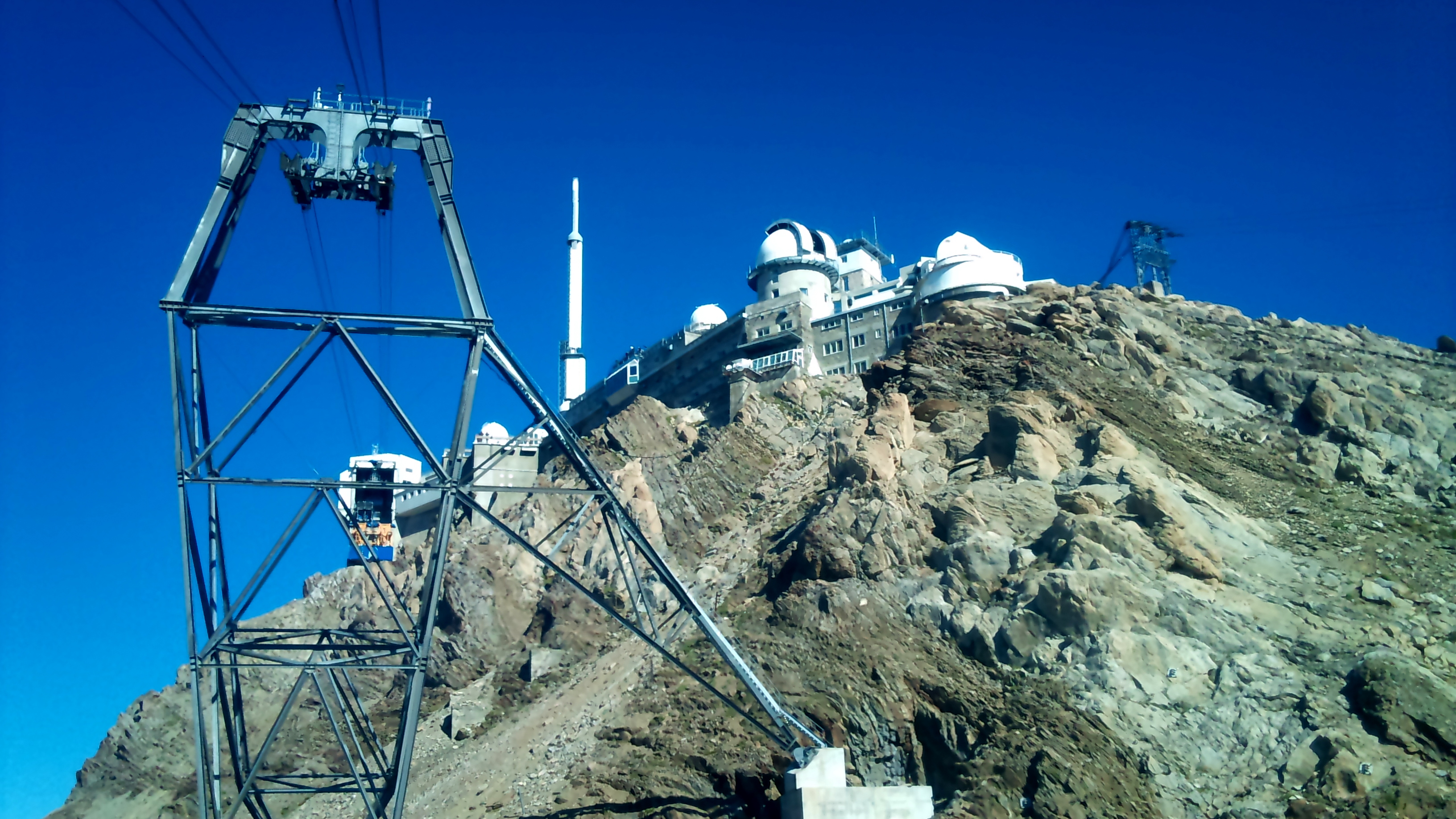
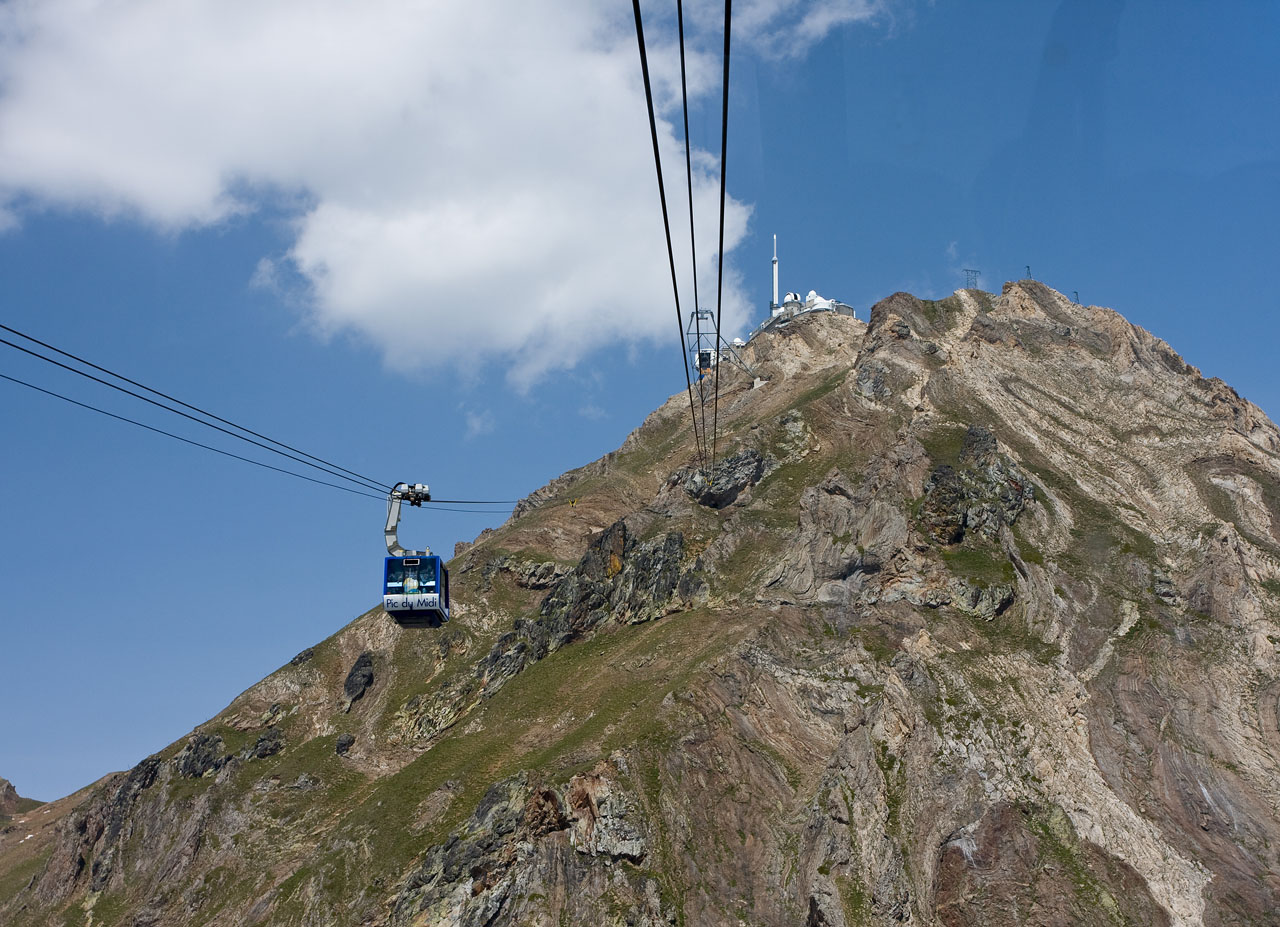
The Pic du Midi Observatory as seen from the ascending cable car

The observatory consists of:

- The 0.55-meter telescope (Robley Dome);
- The 0.60-meter telescope (T60 Dome, welcoming amateur astronomers via the Association T60);
- The 1.06-meter telescope (Gentilli Dome) dedicated to observations of the Solar System;
- The 2-meter telescope or Bernard Lyot Telescope (used with a new generation stellar spectropolarimeter);
- The coronagraph HACO-CLIMSO (studies of the solar corona);
- The bezel Jean Rösch (studies of the solar surface)
- The Charvin dome, which sheltered a photoelectric coronometer (which studied the Sun);
- The Baillaud dome, reassigned to the museum in 2000 and which houses a 1:1 scale model coronagraph.

The observatory is located very close to the Greenwich meridian.

Saturn's moon Helene (Saturn XII or Dione B), was discovered by French astronomers Pierre Laques and Jean Lecacheux in 1980 from ground-based observations at Pic du Midi, and named Helene in 1988. It is also a trojan moon of Dione.

The main-belt asteroid 20488 Pic-du-Midi, discovered at Pises Observatory in 1999, was named for the observatory and the mountain it is located on.

=== List of discovered minor planets ===
The Minor Planet Center credits the discovery of the following minor planets directly to the observatory (as of 2017, no discoveries have been assigned to individual astronomers):

63609 Francoisecolas	20 August 2001	list
82896 Vaubaillon	22 August 2001	list
155948 Maquet	21 August 2001	list
210245 Castets	13 September 2007	list
230151 Vachier	20 August 2001	list

231969 Sebvauclair	24 August 2001	list
275786 Bouley	20 August 2001	list
281272 Arnaudleroy	10 September 2007	list
(336811) 2011 DL_{21}	23 August 2001	list

=== International Dark Sky Reserve ===
Officially initiated in 2009, during the international year of astronomy, the Pic du Midi International Dark Sky Reserve (IDSR) was labeled in 2013 by the International Dark-Sky Association. It's the sixth in the world, the first in Europe and the only one still today in France.

The IDSR aims to limit the exponential propagation of light pollution, in order to preserve the quality of the night. Co-managed by the Syndicat mixte for the tourist promotion of the Pic du Midi, the Pyrénées National Park and the Departmental Energy Union 65, its priority actions are public education on the impacts and consequences of these pollutions as well as the establishment of responsible lighting in the Haut-Pyrenean territory.

It covers 3,000 km^{2}, or 65% of the Hautes-Pyrénées. The IDSR includes 251 communes spread around the Pic du Midi de Bigorre and is distinguished in two zones:

- A core zone, devoid of any permanent lighting and witnessing an exceptional night quality;
- A buffer zone, in which the territory actors recognize the importance of the nocturnal environment and undertake to protect it.

The IDSR initiated the program "Ciel Etoilé" (Starry sky), program of reconversion of the 40 000 luminous points of its territory, the program "Gardiens des Etoiles" (Guardians of the stars), program of metrological monitoring of the light pollution evolution, but also the program "Adap'Ter", project that will identify "trames sombres" (Dark frame: nocturnal biodiversity deplacements).

== Climate ==
Pic du Midi de Bigorre has a mediterranean alpine climate with a polar temperature regime due to its high elevation. Due to the Gulf Stream moderation of the surrounding lowlands, temperature swings are in general quite low. This results in temperatures rarely exceeding 20 °C (68 °F) even during lowland heat waves, and also temperatures beneath −25 °C (−13 °F) being extremely rare. The UV index is higher than in the surrounding lowlands due to the elevation. Snow cover is permanent during winter months, but melts for a few months each year. Seasonal lag is extreme during winter and spring, with February being the clearly coldest month, and May having mean temperatures below freezing. Among lowland climates, the station closely resembles Nuuk in Greenland for the temperature regime.

Climate data for Pic du Midi de Bigorre (1981–2010 normals; extremes 1973–present)
Month	Jan	Feb	Mar	Apr	May	Jun	Jul	Aug	Sep	Oct	Nov	Dec	Year
Record high °C (°F)	6.3 (43.3)	8.0 (46.4)	8.2 (46.8)	11.6 (52.9)	14.1 (57.4)	21.1 (70.0)	20.0 (68.0)	20.7 (69.3)	17.0 (62.6)	13.0 (55.4)	13.3 (55.9)	7.9 (46.2)	21.1 (70.0)
Mean daily maximum °C (°F)	−4.0 (24.8)	−6.1 (21.0)	−3.6 (25.5)	−1.3 (29.7)	0.6 (33.1)	7.1 (44.8)	11.3 (52.3)	9.9 (49.8)	7.2 (45.0)	3.1 (37.6)	−0.7 (30.7)	−3.7 (25.3)	1.7 (35.0)
Daily mean °C (°F)	−6.7 (19.9)	−8.3 (17.1)	−6.5 (20.3)	−4.1 (24.6)	−2.5 (27.5)	4.3 (39.7)	8.5 (47.3)	7.2 (45.0)	4.5 (40.1)	0.5 (32.9)	−3.1 (26.4)	−6.5 (20.3)	−0.5 (31.1)
Mean daily minimum °C (°F)	−9.9 (14.2)	−11.7 (10.9)	−9.3 (15.3)	−6.9 (19.6)	−4.7 (23.5)	1.6 (34.9)	5.6 (42.1)	4.4 (39.9)	1.7 (35.1)	−2.0 (28.4)	−5.4 (22.3)	−9.2 (15.4)	−3.0 (26.6)
Record low °C (°F)	−22.5 (−8.5)	−26.0 (−14.8)	−23.5 (−10.3)	−19.0 (−2.2)	−17.0 (1.4)	−11.5 (11.3)	−7.5 (18.5)	−5.0 (23.0)	−4.5 (23.9)	−9.0 (15.8)	−14.5 (5.9)	−20.0 (−4.0)	−26.0 (−14.8)
Average precipitation mm (inches)	79.4 (3.13)	54.3 (2.14)	56.8 (2.24)	46.6 (1.83)	56.6 (2.23)	56.2 (2.21)	28.2 (1.11)	47.9 (1.89)	56.4 (2.22)	91.3 (3.59)	49.2 (1.94)	82.8 (3.26)	698.5 (27.50)
Average precipitation days	13.4	9.3	11.3	11.1	13.0	10.8	4.8	7.6	7.9	10.3	10.3	14.7	124.5
Source 1: Météo Climat
Source 2: Météo Climat

== See also ==
- List of astronomical observatories
- List of minor planet discoverers § Discovering dedicated institutions
