= Henry Russell (explorer) =

French mountaineer and explorer (1834–1909)

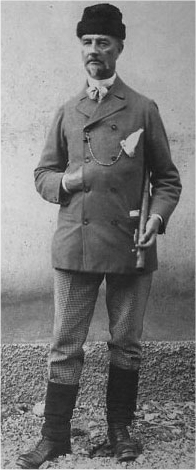
Henry Russell

Henry Patrick Marie, Count Russell-Killough (1834–1909) was one of the pioneers of Pyrenean exploration, known for his obsession with the Vignemale, and considered an early Pyrénéist of the 19th century.

== Early life ==
Russell's father was Thomas John Russell, who was feudal baron of Killough, County Down, and a relative of Charles Russell, later Baron Russell of Killowen. Thomas John Russell emigrated to France aged 22 to escape anti-Catholic discrimination in Ireland. He fought in the Papal Army in 1860 and was made a Papal Count in 1862. Henry was born in Toulouse to Thomas' second wife, Marie-Josephine-Aglaë-Ferdinande, daughter of the Marquis de Flamarens. Henry was educated in Ireland at Clongowes Wood College.

Henry Russell undertook his first distant voyage at the age of 23, to North America.

In 1858 he climbed Pic de Néouvielle in the Néouvielle Massif from Barèges, as well as the Ardiden, and made three ascents of Monte Perdido. In 1859 he made his second voyage, which lasted three years. He travelled to Saint Petersburg, Moscow, Irkutsk and Beijing, crossing the Gobi Desert twice and descending the Amur River. He stayed in Shanghai and Hong Kong, then travelled on to Australia and New Zealand. He spent a year in India and returned to France by Cairo and Istanbul.

== Pyrenean exploration ==
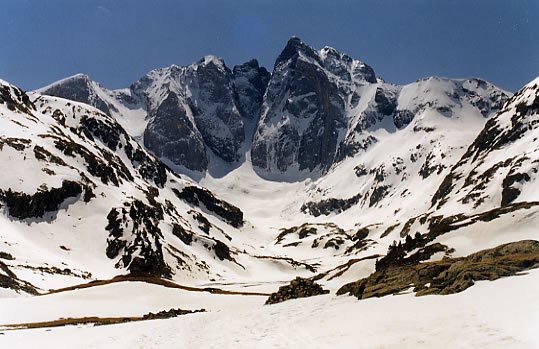
The north face of the Vignemale; Russell's Bellevue caves are out of sight, to the left of the photo

From 1861, Russell became devoted to the exploration of the Pyrenees. On his own or in the company of his guides, he made numerous first ascents, surviving financially on his personal fortune and his investments. He is especially known for his ascents of the Vignemale, which he climbed for the first time on 14 September 1861 with the guide Laurent Passet.

In 1864 in Bagnères-de-Bigorre, together with Charles Packe, Farnham Maxwell-Lyte and Emilien Frossard, he formed a society devoted primarily to the scientific and ethnographic study of the Pyrenees: the Société Ramond (Ramond Society, named after the famous Pyrenean explorer, Louis Ramond de Carbonnières), still extant today. In 1868 he climbed the Vignemale for a second time, with Hippolyte Passet. For his third ascent on 11 February 1869, and the first winter ascent of the peak, he was accompanied by Hippolyte and Henri Passet.

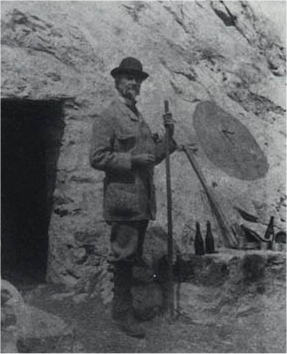
Henry Russell in front of one of his caves on the Vignemale

Being keen to spend nights on the Vignemale, he bivouacked in the open – buried by his guides in a blanket of rocks and earth – on the summit of Pic Longue on 26 August 1880. It was at this point that he considered the installation of caves on the mountain, reasoning that any other construction would be unaesthetic and unwelcome. On his instructions, seven caves were built between 1881 and 1893.

In August 1882, the first cave was completed; this was the villa Russell, located at 3,205 m at the col of Cerbillonna (the cave was 3 m in depth, 2.5 m broad and 2 m in height). Russell lived in the cave for three days, and on 12 August 1884 he had the cave – as well as the mountain – blessed by a priest. In 1885 digging started on the second cave (that of the Guides), then in 1886 on the third: the Grotte des Dames (the Ladies cave). On 5 December 1888 he asked the prefect of the Hautes-Pyrénées to grant the concession of the Vignemale to him (comprising 200 ha between 2,300 and 3,300 m). The annual rent was fixed at 1 franc over 99 years, and payment began in January 1889.

When the Ossoue glacier covered his caves, three others were dug 800 m lower, at the base of the glacier (2,400m): these are known as the Bellevue caves. He organized sumptuous and legendary banquets at these caves, receiving princes and notables there on Persian carpets and styling himself as the Comte des Monts. These caves lacked the grandeur of his higher perches, however, so for his seventh and final cave – Le Paradis – he had a spot 18 m below the summit of the Vignemale dynamited to effect a suitable dwelling. It was here, when he was sixty, that he celebrated the 'silver wedding' of his first ascent. He made his thirty-third and final ascent of the Vignemale on 8 August 1904.

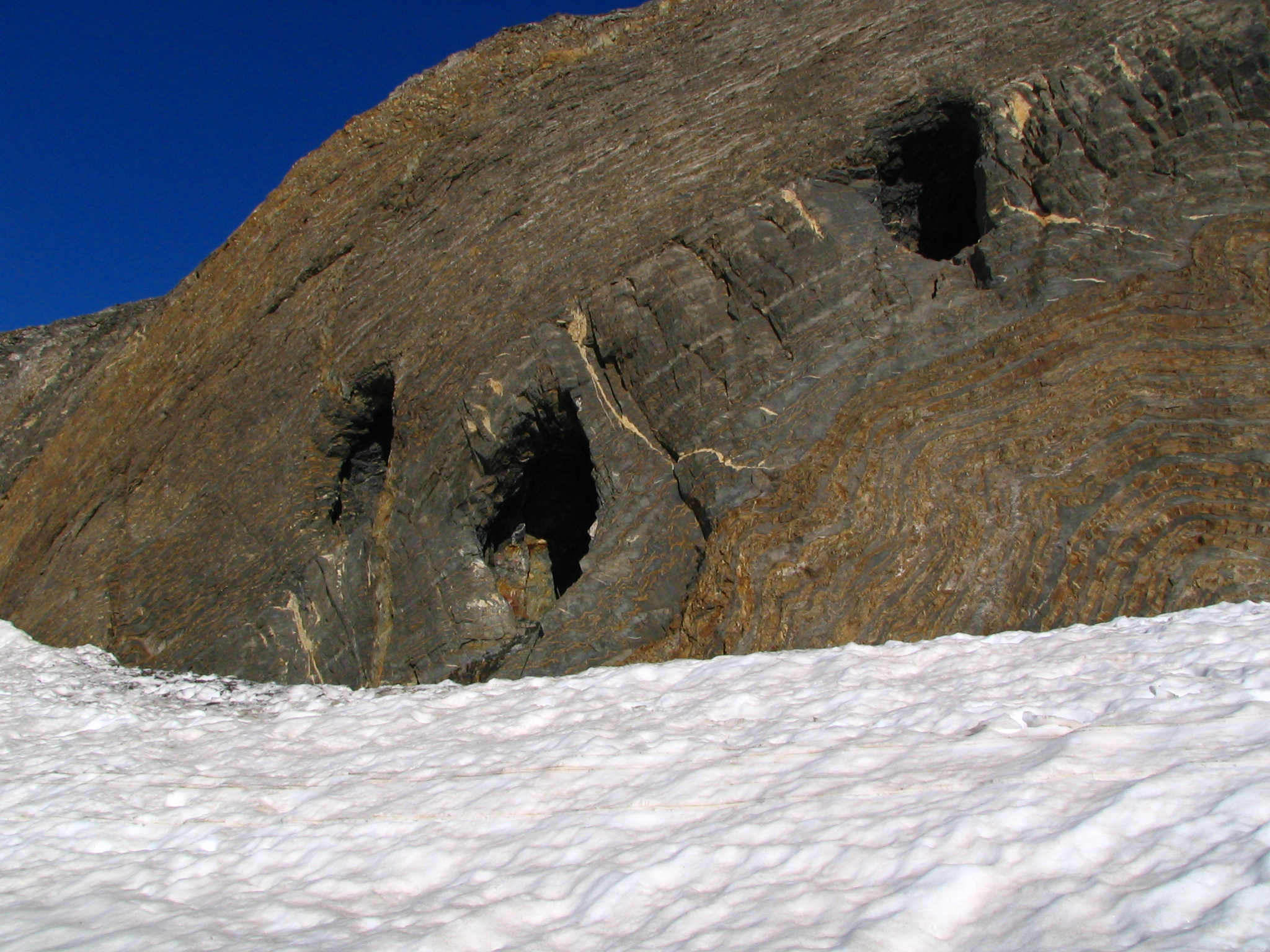
The entrances to Russell's caves above the Glacier d'Ossoue, Vignemale

Pic Russell in the Maladeta massif is named after him; he made the first ascent in 1865.

On his death in Biarritz in 1909, he was buried at the cemetery in Pau.

== First ascents ==
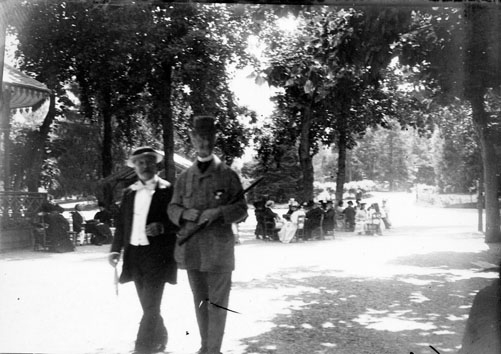
Russell (right) and the baron de Lassus (left) in Luchon, in 1895, photograph by Eugène Trutat

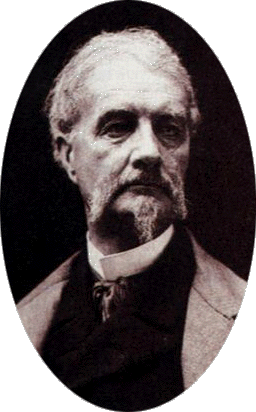
Henry Russell

The following is a selection of Russell's first ascents in the Pyrenees. Names of companions are given; otherwise the ascents were undertaken alone.

- Pic d'Ardiden, 2988 m, 1858
- Lustou, 3023 m, 1864
- Pic Carlit, 2921 m, 1864
- Pic des Gourgs Blancs, 3129 m, with J. Haurillon, 1864
- Pico de Coronas, 3293 m, with a porter, 1864
- Cilindro de Marboré, 3,328 m, with Hippolyte Passet, 1864
- Pic Russell, 3205 m, with C. Packe, 1865
- Marboré, 3248 m, with Hippolyte Passet, 24 September 1865
- Pena del Infierno Ctl., 3082 m, with Sarettes, 20 June 1867
- Pico Royo, 3121 m, with Haurillon, 1868
- Pic d'Albe, 3107 m, with Haurillon, July 1868
- Grande Fache 3005 m, with Latour, August 1874
- Gabiétous Or., 3031 m, with C. Passet, September 1874
- Garmo Negro, 3051 m, with Sarettes, Pablo Belio, 23 June 1876
- Pic Occ. de la Cascade, 3095 m, with C. Passet 1877
- 2e Pic Occ. de la Maladeta, 3220 m, with C. Passet, 25 August 1877
- Eriste S, 3045 m, 17 July 1878
- Grand Eriste, 3053 m, with F. Barrau, 17 July 1878
- Robiñera, 3003 m, with C. Passet, 13 August 1878
- Punta del Sabre, 3136 m, with C. Passet, Vincent Grassy, 10 September 1878
- Petit Astazou 3012 m, with C. Passet, 21 July 1879
- Punta de Lliterola, 3132 m, with C. Passet, 30 July 1879
- Grand Quayrat, 3060 m, with Henri Reboul Peytier, Hossard C. Passet, 1 August 1879
- Tuca de Mulleres, 3010 m, with F. Barrau, B. Courrèges, 5 August 1879
- Pic d'Aragüells, 3037 m, with F. Barrau, 10 August 1880
- Pico del Medio, 3346 m, with Firmin Barrau, Célestin Passet, 12 July 1881
- Pic Occ. de Clarabide, 3020 m, 6 July 1882
- Pic Or. de Clarabide, 3012 m, with F. Barrau, C. Passet, 6 July 1882
- Diente de Alba, 3136 m, with Barthélémy Courrèges, 31 August 1882
- Grand Pic de Tapou, 3150 m, with Haurine, Pierre Pujo, 1 August 1883
- Pic du Milieu de Tapou, 3130 m, with Haurine, Pierre Pujo, 1 August 1883
- Pic des Pavots, 3121 m, with Pierre Barrau (fils), André Subra, 22 June 1885

== Bibliography ==
Works by Russell

- Par voies et chemins dans le Nouveau-Monde, Bagnères-de-Bigorre, 1858
- 'Le Pic Cotieilla', article in Explorations Pyrénéennes. Bulletin Trimestriel de la Société Ramond, Bagnères de Bigorre: Cazenave, January 1866, nr. 1
- 16 000 lieues à travers l'Asie et l'Océanie. Voyage exécuté pendant les années 1858–1861. Paris: Hachette, 1864 (reissued: Amyot, 1866, without the map and the panorama). 2 volumes
- Les Pyrénées, les Ascensions et la Philosophie de l'exercice, Pau: Vignancour, 1865
- Les Grandes Ascensions des Pyrénées. D'une mer à l'autre. Guide spécial du piéton, orné de 12 cartes, Paris: Hachette; Toulouse: Privat, 1866
- A Fortnight in the Pyrenees (Luchon to San-Sebastian), Pau: Vignancour, 1868
- Biarritz and Basque Countries, London: Stanford, 1873
- Souvenirs d'un montagnard, Pau: Vignancour, Lalheugue, 1878 (1st edition)
- Pau, Biarritz Pyrénées, Pau: Vignancour, 1890
- Pyrenaïca, Pau: Vignancour, 1902
- Meteorology of Pau, during fifteen winters, Pau: Vignancour, 1903
- Souvenirs d'un montagnard, Pau: Vignancour, 1908 (2nd edition)
- Mes voyages (1856–1861), Pau: Vignancour, 1906

Works about Russell

- Rosemary Bailey, The Man Who Married a Mountain, Bantam Books, 2005, ISBN 0-553-81523-7
- Louis Le Bondidier, Le Centenaire d'Henry Russell (1834–1934). Opinions sur Russell, Pau: Imprimerie Marrimpouey Jeune, 1934, 78 pp.
- Louis Le Bondidier, Henry Russell, 1834–1909, notice biographique, Bagnères: Imprimerie Péré, 1910, 36 pp.
- Georges Sabatier, Henry Russell, montagnard des Pyrénées, Pau: Librairie des Pyrénées, 2000, 135 pp.
- Paul Mieille, Le Russell de la Jeunesse, Tarbes: Imprimerie Lesbordes, 1910, 391 pp.
- Jacques Labarère, Henry Russell et l'Histoire d'un Cœur, Biarritz: Amis du Livre Pyrénéen, 2007, 110 pp.
- Jacques Labarère, Henry Russell-Killough (1834–1909), explorateur des Pyrénées, bio-bibliographie, Pau: Edition du Gave, 2003, volume 1, 217 pp.; volume 2, 204 pp.
- Alberto Martínez Embid, Yo, Henry Russell, Prames, 2005, 320 pp.
