= Henry Maxwell Lyte =

English historian and archivist

Henry Maxwell Lyte KCB FBA
- 1933 portrait of Sir Henry Churchill Maxwell Lyte by the artist Samuel Melton Fisher (1860–1939), now in the National Portrait Gallery.
- Born: 29 May 1848; London, England
- Died: 28 October 1940 (aged 92); Dinder, Somerset, England
- Education: Christ Church, Oxford
- Spouse: Frances Somerville (m. 1871)
- Children: 6
- Relatives: Henry Francis Lyte (grandfather); Farnham Maxwell Lyte (uncle)

Sir Henry Churchill Maxwell Lyte (or Maxwell-Lyte) (29 May 1848 – 28 October 1940) was an English historian and archivist. He served as Deputy Keeper of the Public Records from 1886 to 1926, and was the author of numerous books including a history of Eton College.

== Family ==
Maxwell Lyte was born on 29 May 1848 in London, to John Walker Maxwell Lyte and his wife Emily Jeanette Lyte. He was the grandson of Henry Francis Lyte. He was educated at Eton College and at Christ Church, Oxford, taking a B.A. Honours degree(s) in Law and History, later promoted by seniority to M.A. He married Frances Fownes Somerville on 3 January 1871 in Wells, Somerset. Their children were Agnes (22 October 1871); Edith (30 October 1872); Margaret (27 March 1874); John (15 June 1875); Walter (4 March 1877); and Arthur (10 April 1881), who was educated at Eton and Magdalen College, Oxford, and in 1936 became an assistant secretary of the Board of Education.

== Early career ==
Maxwell Lyte published his first book, A History of Eton College, in 1875. In 1880 and 1881 he wrote a series of papers on Dunster and its Lords for the Archaeological Journal, which were later reprinted as a book. In 1886, he published History of the University of Oxford from the earliest times to the year 1530. For several years Maxwell Lyte was an inspector of the Royal Commission on Historical Manuscripts.

In 1886, he was appointed Deputy Keeper of the Public Record Office (PRO) in succession to William Hardy. As a newcomer, he was initially resented by the staff of the office, but quickly asserted his authority. He reformed the clerks' pay structure, began plans for a permanent museum, organised a project to celebrate 800 years since production of the Domesday Book and in 1889 introduced a lift and electric lights in the building. Despite public opposition, he demolished the Rolls Chapel to make room for an extension along Chancery Lane, incorporating the chancel arch, stained glass and monuments in the museum.

In 1890 Maxwell Lyte went to Rome and drew up the rules for editing a Calendar of Papal Registers, starting with those of Pope Innocent III. Reviewers later criticised the omission of the rules themselves from the printed calendar, which reduced its value to researchers.

The PRO had been publishing the Rolls Series, critically edited versions of selected texts in the Record Office. Although many were of great value, there were failures and a sense of amateurishness in some of the publications. Maxwell Lyte was influential in the decision to transfer editors and funding from work on the series to the more valuable work of publishing public records. In 1892 he introduced the Lists and Indexes series. By terminating the Rolls Series in 1894 and concentrating on making guides and calendars to the records, which professional historians could now access directly, Maxwell Lyte transformed the Record Office into a centre of scholarship. He was instrumental in the passage of an Act of Parliament in 1898 that allowed for destruction of records of little apparent value back to 1660.

== Later career ==
In 1908, Maxwell Lyte arranged for a new Guide to the contents of the PRO. In 1910 he became engaged in a struggle to prevent records on Wales being transferred there, refusing to co-operate with a commission set up for this purpose. In 1914, as Deputy Keeper of the Public Records, he opposed reduction of controls over access to the public records. Although personally in favour of giving the public access to documents up to 1860, for later records he recommended that each case be subject to an inquiry about the purpose and extent of the research. His concern was that the researcher might publish distorted and damaging work based on a biased selection, and could even be in the pay of foreign powers. During the planning of the National War Museum in 1917, as keeper of the Public Record Office he decided against giving custody of War Records to the museum. In 1924 he was appointed chairman of a committee established by the British Academy to prepare a dictionary of Medieval Latin based on British sources dating between 1066 and 1600.

Maxwell Lyte was made a Companion of the Bath in January 1889 and a Knight Commander of the Bath in 1897. He retired from the PRO in 1926, and was succeeded by A. E. Stamp. He died on 28 October 1940 in Dinder House, Dinder, Somerset.

== Bibliography ==
- Maxwell Lyte, Henry Churchill (1875). A History of Eton College, 1440–1875. Macmillan. ISBN 1-143-50130-6.; 2nd edition, 1889; 4th edition, 1911
- Maxwell Lyte, Henry Churchill (1885). Report on the Manuscripts of the Dean and Chapter of St. Paul's. Royal Commission on Historical Manuscripts. London: H.M.S.O.
- Maxwell Lyte, Henry Churchill (1886). A History of the University of Oxford: from the earliest times to the year 1530. London: Macmillan. ISBN 1-164-80950-4.
- Maxwell Lyte, Henry Churchill (1888–1905). The Manuscripts of His Grace the Duke of Rutland, K.G. preserved at Belvoir Castle. Royal Commission on Historical Manuscripts. Vol. 4 vols. London: H.M.S.O.
- Maxwell Lyte, Henry Churchill (1893). Great Public Schools: Eton–Harrow–Charterhouse–Cheltenham–Rugby–Clifton–Westminster–Marlborough–Haileybury–Winchester. London: E. Arnold. ISBN 1-151-17735-0.
- Maxwell Lyte, Henry Churchill (1905). Catalogue of Manuscripts and Other Objects in the Museum of the Public Record Office. London: H.M.S.O.
- Maxwell-Lyte, Henry Churchill (1909). A History of Dunster and of the Families of Mohun & Luttrell. London: St. Catherine Press. ISBN 1458815129.
- Maxwell Lyte, Henry Churchill; Black, J. G.; Brodie, R. H. V. (1914). Calendar of the Patent Rolls preserved in the Public Record Office. Vol. 53–54. H.M.S.O.
- Maxwell Lyte, Henry Churchill (1915). A Descriptive Catalogue of Ancient Deeds in the Public Record Office: Series, Volume 6. H. M. Stationery Office.
- Maxwell Lyte, Henry Churchill (1915). Calendar of Fine Rolls: preserved in the Public Record Office... London: H.M.S.O.
- Maxwell Lyte, Henry Churchill (1916). Calendar of Inquisitions Miscellaneous (Chancery): preserved in the Public Record Office... [Preface by H. C. Maxwell Lyte.] London: H.M.S.O.
- Maxwell-Lyte, Henry Churchill (1917). Documents and extracts illustrating the history of the Honour of Dunster. Somerset Record Society.
- Maxwell Lyte, Henry Churchill (1918). Documents and extracts illustrating the history of the Honour of Dunster.
- Maxwell Lyte, Henry Churchill (1920). Journal of the commissioners for trade and plantations... H.M.S.O.
- Maxwell Lyte, Henry Churchill (1920). The Book of Fees: commonly called Testa de Nevill. London: H.M.S.O.
- Maxwell Lyte, Henry Churchill (1920). Two Registers Formerly Belongings to the Family of Beauchamp of Hatch. Butler & Tanner. ISBN 1-177-25653-3.
- Maxwell Lyte, Henry Churchill; Brodie, R. H. V. (1924). Edward VI. Volumes 55–61 of Calendar of the Patent Rolls preserved in the Public Record Office. London: H.M.S.O.
- Maxwell Lyte, Henry C. (1926). Historical Notes on the Use of the Great Seal of England. London: H.M.S.O.
- Maxwell Lyte, Henry Churchill (1931). Historical Notes on some Somerset manors formerly connected with the honour of Dunster. Somerset Record Society.
- Maxwell Lyte, Henry Churchill (1931). Historical Notes on some Somerset manors. Somerset, Butler & Tanner.
- Maxwell-Lyte, Henry Churchill (1937). The Registers of Robert Stillington, Bishop of Bath and Wells, 1466–1491, and Richard Fox, Bishop of Bath and Wells, 1492–1494. Somerset Record Society.
- Maxwell-Lyte, Henry Churchill (1939). The Registers of Oliver King, Bishop of Bath and Wells, 1496–1503, and Hadrian de Castello, Bishop of Bath and Wells, 1503–1518. Somerset Record Society.
- Maxwell Lyte, Henry Churchill (1940). The Register of Thomas Wolsey, Bishop of Bath and Wells 1518–1523, John Clerke, Bishop of Bath and Wells 1523–1541, William Knyght, Bishop of Bath and Wells 1541–1547 and Gilbert Bourne, Bishop of Bath and Wells 1554–1559. Butler & Tanner.
