= Farnham Maxwell Lyte =

English chemist and photographer

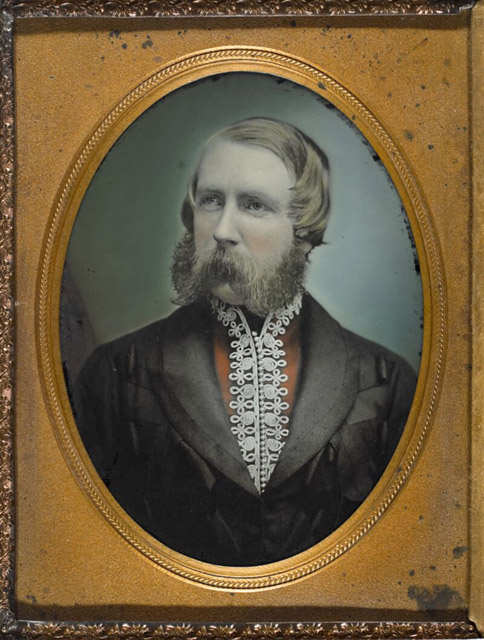
- Farnham Maxwell Lyte in c. 1870
- Born: 10 January 1828; Brixham, Devon, England
- Died: 4 March 1906 (aged 78); South Kensington, London, England
- Education: Christ's College, Cambridge
- Known for: Photographs of the French Pyrenees
- Spouse: Eleanora Bolton (m. 1851)
- Children: 5
- Father: Henry Francis Lyte
- Relatives: Henry Maxwell Lyte (nephew)

Farnham Maxwell Lyte FRSC (10 January 1828 – 4 March 1906), sometimes Maxwell Farnham Lyte, and after his death often called Maxwell-Lyte, was an English chemist and the pioneer of a number of techniques in photographic processing. As a photographer he is known for his views of the French Pyrenees.

== Early life ==
Lyte was born on 10 January 1828 in Brixham, Devon, the fifth and last child of Henry Francis Lyte (the author of "Abide with Me") and Anne Maxwell.

Lyte was sixteen when he first came across photography, hearing the news of William Henry Fox Talbot's invention of the calotype. In 1846, as F. M. Lyte, he entered Christ's College, Cambridge, where he graduated BA in chemical engineering in 1851, promoted to MA in 1863. On leaving Cambridge, the young Lyte became a mining engineer and was an Associate of the Society of Civil Engineers and a Fellow of the Chemical Society.

== Photography ==
In 1853, Lyte travelled to Luz-Saint-Sauveur in the Pyrenees on account of his bad health, and in 1856 his family joined him there. He settled in Pau and frequented an English circle, in which he met a group of photographers including John Stewart, Jean-Jacques Heilmann, Pierre Langlumé, and Louis Désiré Blanquart-Evrard, who were known as the "Group of Pau". He lived in France from 1853 until 1880. In 1854, he was one of the founders of the Société française de photographie and also became an Honorary Fellow of the Royal Photographic Society.

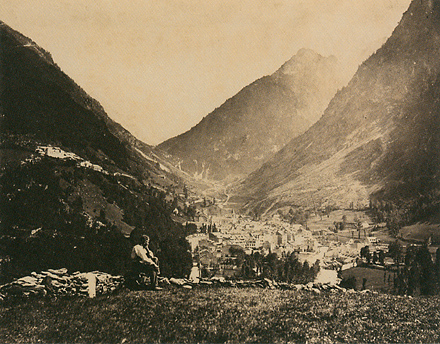
Pyrenees, 1860, Maxwell Lyte, 1860

=== Processing ===
As both a chemist and a photographer, Lyte made many improvements to the technique of photographic processing, working with collodion and wax paper, and introducing a process of his own invention which he called métagélatine; this process was adopted by several photographers and is described, as the "Metagelatine Dry Process", in Wilson's Cyclopedic Photography. In 1854 he wrote up the results of his investigations into what became known as the "honey" process. This was "a method of improving the wet-collodion process by extending the longevity of the sensitized plate" As its name suggests, in this process honey was used both as the preservative solution and in the dusting-in (the 17 June 1854 issue of Notes and Queries contains his description and analysis of his experiments with the process). Maxwell Lyte's letter appeared a fortnight after George Shadbolt, former editor of the British Photographic Journal, had independently contacted the Photographic Society (now the Royal Photographic Society), giving his description of an identical experiment with honey.

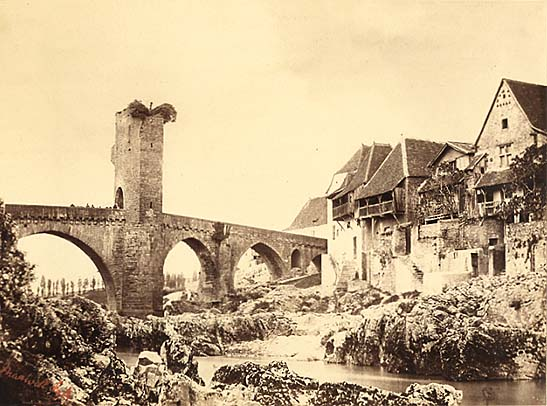
Pont d'Orthez, Basses-Pyrenees, by Maxwell Lyte, c. 1858

Lyte was one of the pioneers of inserting an imported sky into a landscape photograph to mitigate the problems of sensitivity of the collodion plates, a process that he justified in a letter of 6 November 1861 to the journal Moniteur de la photographie. In the April 1862 issue of the British Journal of Photography he published his findings on the presence of "anti-chlors" in photographic paper, a substance that jeopardised the stability of silver prints. He introduced borax and phosphate toning baths that are still used today, as well as pioneering the use of iodide.

=== Landscape photography ===
Maxwell Lyte took scenic photographs in the period just before commercial photographers started to take and market mass-produced views in the 1860s. According to Dan Younger (in notes for an exhibition of antique photographs at Kenyon College):

Wealthy amateur photographers in Great Britain—usually landed gentry—worked in the 1850s without a wide audience beyond their own immediate circle, and thus with little or no commercial intent (an example from this amateur period may be seen in the salted paper print by Maxwell Farnham Lyte [sic] displayed on the wall to the left of this panel). Privileged amateurs sought through small exchange clubs to communicate with each other about the technical and aesthetic challenges of early paper photography.

Maxwell Lyte photographed the mountains, villages, waterfalls and bridges of the Pyrenees, often exhibiting his photographs under the auspices of the Société française de photographie. He showed them almost every year from 1855 to 1865 in cities such as London, Glasgow, Edinburgh and Paris, and received several international prizes: he won the silver medal at 1855 Exposition Universelle in Paris, and his Pyrenean landscapes gained him a gold medal in Bordeaux in 1859. He also regularly submitted photographs to the Photographic Society of Scotland's annual exhibition in Edinburgh, sending his entries from his home in Pau and winning silver medals at the 5th exhibition (for Pierrefith) and 7th exhibition (for Lac d'Oo). Despite the thoroughness of his instructions for the transport of his fragile prints from Pau to Scotland, the Daily Scotsman of 26 December 1859 wrote:

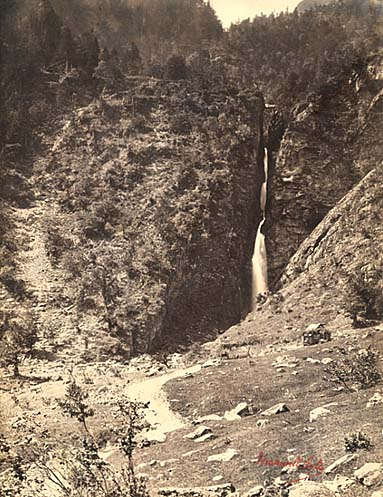
Cascade de l'Enfer à Luchon, by Maxwell Lyte, c. 1858

Maxwell Lyte: Bagneres di Bigonne [sic] – An excellent specimen. Other specimens of the same artist are equally good; and we are happy to add that the injury these beautiful views sustained in their transmission to this country, by a nail being driven through them has been skillfully repaired, and does not now injure their general effect.

—

Several of his photographs were included in an 1858 volume of Pyrenean views entitled Vues, costumes et monuments des Pyrénées, copies de grands maîtres.

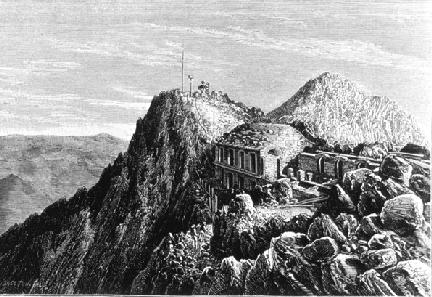
Members of the Société Ramond lay the first stone of the Pic du Midi de Bigorre observatory in 1879, artist unknown

== Société Ramond ==
In 1864, Lyte was among the founders of the Société Ramond, a learned society devoted to the ethnographic and scientific study of the Pyrenees. Although he did not take part in the initial meeting at the hôtel des Voyageurs in Gavarnie attended by Henry Russell, Charles Packe, and Émilien Frossard and his two sons, he attended the second meeting at Frossard's house in Bagnères-de-Bigorre. At this meeting the rules for admittance were laid down, the society was given its name, and executive positions were decided upon; Maxwell Lyte was chosen as the society's first vice-president. It was on the initiative of the Société Ramond that the observatory on the Pic du Midi de Bigorre was built. Before its construction, Lyte had carried out observations with a large telescope, and made photographs of the eclipse of the sun of 18 July 1860. He also made meteorological readings, determining the average temperature of Bagnères-de-Bigorre over two years of recordings.

== Later years ==
Maxwell Lyte gave up photography when he moved with his family to Dax. Returning to his original profession as a mining engineer, he bought the sulphur springs of Moudang and a salt mine in Dax, but these were failures. He died suddenly in 1906 at his residence at 60 Finborough Road, South Kensington, London, and was buried at St Mary The Boltons, Kensington. In its review of the year 1906, the British Journal of Photography noted his death and offered the following estimation of his contribution to photographic processing:

The death of Farnham Maxwell Lyte deprives photography of one of its early workers, though his active connection with photography lasted only about sixteen years – from 1854 to 1870. His most notable achievement in photographic process was, however, the invention of the so-called "honey" process, by which the wet collodion plate could be retained in workable condition for several days ... Mr. Lyte was also one of the first to point out the danger to photographs of "anti-chlor" impurities in mounts. He was the originator of the present borax and phosphate toning baths and the introducer of iodine into collodion emulsion for better color rendering.

—

== Personal life ==
In 1851, Lyte married Eleanora Julia Bolton (1828–1896), a daughter of Cornelius H. Bolton, of Faithlegg, County Waterford, with whom he had five children. In 1894, their son Cecil Henry Maxwell Lyte married the Hon. Mary Lucy Agnes Stourton, a daughter of Alfred Stourton, 23rd Baron Mowbray and his wife Mary Margaret Corbally.

== Bibliography ==
- Henri Beraldi, Cent ans aux Pyrénées, Paris, 1898–1904, 7 volumes in octavo. Republished by Les Amis du Livre Pyrénéen, Pau, 1977; then by Librairie des Pyrénées et de Gascogne, Pau, 2001
- Paul Mironeau, Christine Juliat, Lucie Abadia, Pyrénées en images. De l'œil à l'objectif. 1820–1860 (cat. exp.), musée national du Château de Pau, 1996, 128 pp
- Hélène Saule-Sorbé, Les Pyrénées photographiées de Farnham Maxwell Lyte, extrait du Bulletin de la Société Ramond, 2004
- Obituary, The Times, 6 March 1906
