= Spore =

Unit of reproduction adapted for dispersal and survival in unfavorable conditions

Spores produced in a sporic life cycle

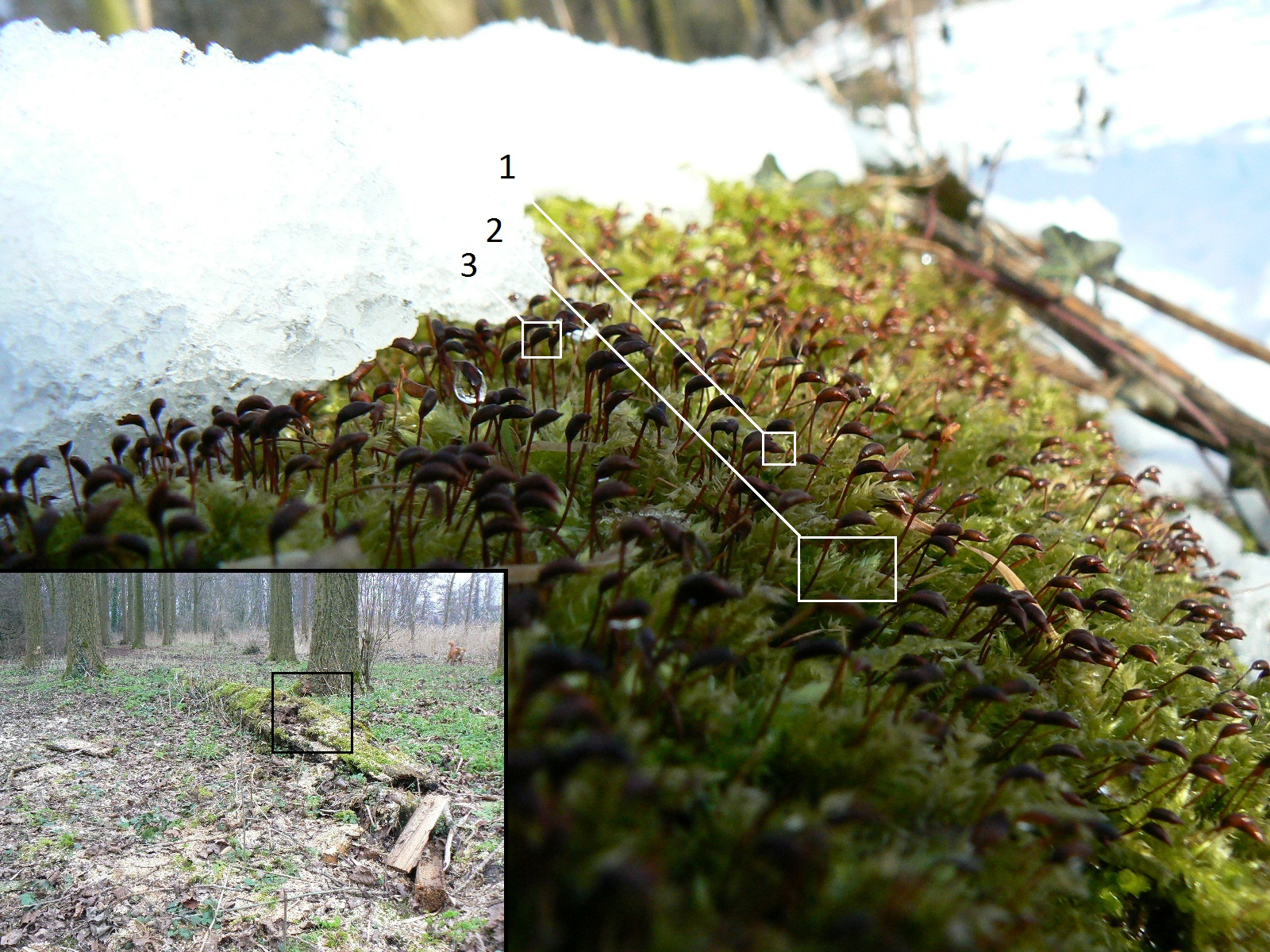
Fresh snow partially covers rough-stalked feather-moss (Brachythecium rutabulum), growing on a thinned hybrid black poplar (Populus x canadensis). The last stage of the moss lifecycle is shown, where the sporophytes are visible before dispersion of their spores: the calyptra (1) is still attached to the capsule (3). The tops of the gametophytes (2) can be discerned as well. Inset shows the surrounding, black poplars growing on sandy loam on the bank of a kolk, with the detail area marked.

In biology, a spore is a unit of sexual (in fungi) or asexual reproduction that may be adapted for dispersal and for survival, often for extended periods of time, in unfavourable conditions. Spores form part of the life cycles of many plants, algae, fungi and protozoa. They were thought to have appeared as early as the mid-late Ordovician period as an adaptation of early land plants.

Bacterial spores are not part of a sexual cycle, but are resistant structures used for survival under unfavourable conditions. Myxozoan spores release amoeboid infectious germs ("amoebulae") into their hosts for parasitic infection, but also reproduce within the hosts through the pairing of two nuclei within the plasmodium, which develops from the amoebula.

In plants, spores are usually haploid and unicellular and are produced by meiosis in the sporangium of a diploid sporophyte. In some rare cases, a diploid spore is also produced in some algae, or fungi. Under favourable conditions, the spore can develop into a new organism using mitotic division, producing a multicellular gametophyte, which eventually goes on to produce gametes. Two gametes fuse to form a zygote, which develops into a new sporophyte. This cycle is known as alternation of generations.

The spores of seed plants are produced internally, and the megaspores (formed within the ovules) and the microspores are involved in the formation of more complex structures that form the dispersal units, the seeds and pollen grains.

== Definition ==
The term spore derives from Greek σπορά, spora, meaning 'seed, sowing', related to σπόρος, sporos, 'sowing', and speirein, 'to sow'.

In common parlance, the difference between a "spore" and a "gamete" is that a spore will germinate and develop into a sporeling, while a gamete needs to combine with another gamete to form a zygote before developing further.

The main difference between spores and seeds as dispersal units is that spores are unicellular, the first cell of a gametophyte, while seeds contain within them a developing embryo (the multicellular sporophyte of the next generation), produced by the fusion of the male gamete of the pollen tube with the female gamete formed by the megagametophyte within the ovule. Spores germinate to give rise to haploid gametophytes, while seeds germinate to give rise to diploid sporophytes.

== Classification of spore-producing organisms ==
=== Plants ===
Vascular plant spores are always haploid. Vascular plants are either homosporous (also known as isosporous) or heterosporous. Plants that are homosporous produce spores of the same size and type.

Heterosporous plants, such as seed plants, spikemosses, quillworts, and ferns of the order Salviniales produce spores of two different sizes: the larger spore (megaspore) in effect functioning as a "female" spore that grows into a female gametophyte, and the smaller (microspore) functioning as a "male" that grows into a male gametophyte. Such plants typically give rise to the two kind of spores from within separate sporangia, either a megasporangium that produces megaspores or a microsporangium that produces microspores. In flowering plants, these sporangia occur within the carpel and anthers, respectively.

=== Fungi ===
Fungi commonly produce spores during sexual and asexual reproduction. Spores are usually haploid and grow into mature haploid individuals through mitotic division of cells (Urediniospores and Teliospores among rusts are dikaryotic). Dikaryotic cells result from the fusion of two haploid gamete cells. Among sporogenic dikaryotic cells, karyogamy (the fusion of the two haploid nuclei) occurs to produce a diploid cell. Diploid cells undergo meiosis to produce haploid spores.

== Classification of spores ==
Spores can be classified in several ways such as by their spore producing structure, function, origin during life cycle, and mobility.

Below is a table listing the mode of classification, name, identifying characteristic, examples, and images of different spore species.

Mode of Classification	Name		Identifying Characteristic	Example Spore Containing Organism	Image
Spore Producing Structure	Sporangiospore		Produced by sporangium	Zygomycetes	Sporangium of Fungi
Spore Producing Structure	Zygospores		Produced by zygosporangium	Zygomycetes	Zygospores on Rhizopus
Spore Producing Structure	Ascospores		Produced by ascus	Ascomycetes	Ascospores of Didymella Rabiei
Spore Producing Structure	Basidiospores		Produced by basidium	Basidiomycetes	Typical reproductive structure of a basidiomycete, including the basidiospore and basidium
Spore Producing Structure	Aecispores		Produced by aecium	Rusts and Smuts	Aecia on foliage
Spore Producing Structure	Urediniospores		Produced by uredinium	Rusts and Smuts	Uredinospores
Spore Producing Structure	Teliospores		Produced by teilum	Rusts and Smuts	Microscopic image of teliospores
Spore Producing Structure	Oospores		Produced by oogonium	Oomycetes	Oospores of Phytophthora agathidicida
Spore Producing Structure	Carpospores		Produced by carposophorophyte	Red Algae	Light microscopy of Polysiphonia showing a carpospores and carposporophyte inside
Spore Producing Structure	Tetraspores		Produced by tetrasphorophyte	Red Algae	Tetraspores of Polysiphonia
Function	Chlamydospore		Thick-walled resting spores of fungi produced to survive in unfavorable conditions	Ascomycota	Pseudohyphae, chlamydospores and blastospores of Candida yeast
Function	Parasitic Fungal Spore	Internal Spores	Germinate within a host		A parasitic pink fungi on a Lichen tree
Function	Parasitic Fungal Spore	External (Environmental) spores	Spores released by the host to infest other hosts		A parasitic pink fungi on a Lichen tree
Origin During Life Cycle	Meiospores	Microspores	Produced sexually through meiosis, and give rise to a male gametophyte	Pollen in seed plants	In plants, microspores, and in some cases megaspores, are formed from all four products of meiosis.
Origin During Life Cycle	Meiospores	Megaspores (macrospores)	Produced sexually through meiosis, and give rise to a female gametophyte	Ovule in seed plants	In contrast, in many seed plants and heterosporous ferns, only a single product of meiosis will become a megaspore (macrospore), with the rest degenerating.
Origin During Life Cycle	Mitospores		Produced asexually though mitosis	Ascomycetes	Ascomycete containing mitospores
Mobility	Zoospores		Mobile through flagella	Some algae and fungi	Microscopic image of a Zoospore
Mobility	Aplanospores		Immobile, however still produce flagella		
Mobility	Autospores		Immobile spores that do not produce flagella		Autospores of a strain of Jenufa aeroterrestrica
Mobility	Ballistospores		Forcibly discharged from the fungal fruiting body due to internal force (such as built up pressure)	Basidiospores and/or part of the genus Pilobus	Ballistospore mechanism of dispersal from fungi
Mobility	Stratismospores		Forcibly discharged from the fungal fruting body due to external force (such as raindrops or passing animals)	Puffballs	Puff Balls containing Stratismospores

== External anatomy ==
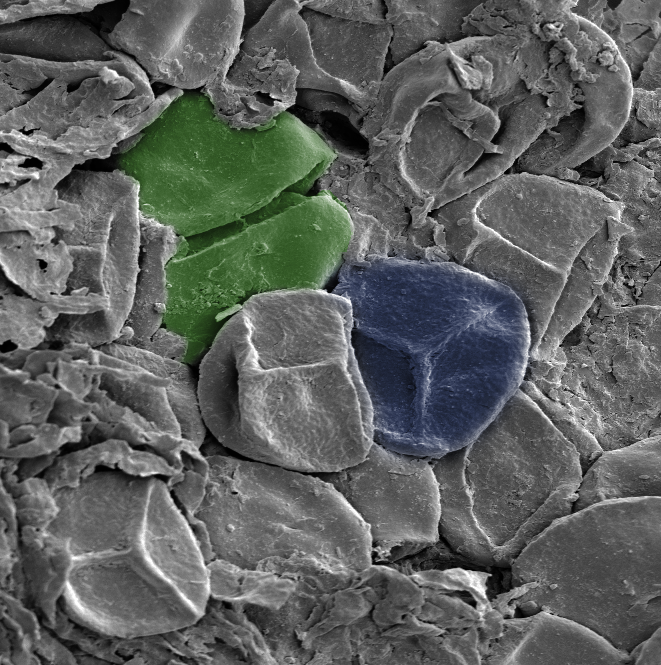
Fossil trilete spores (blue) and a spore tetrad (green) of Late Silurian origin

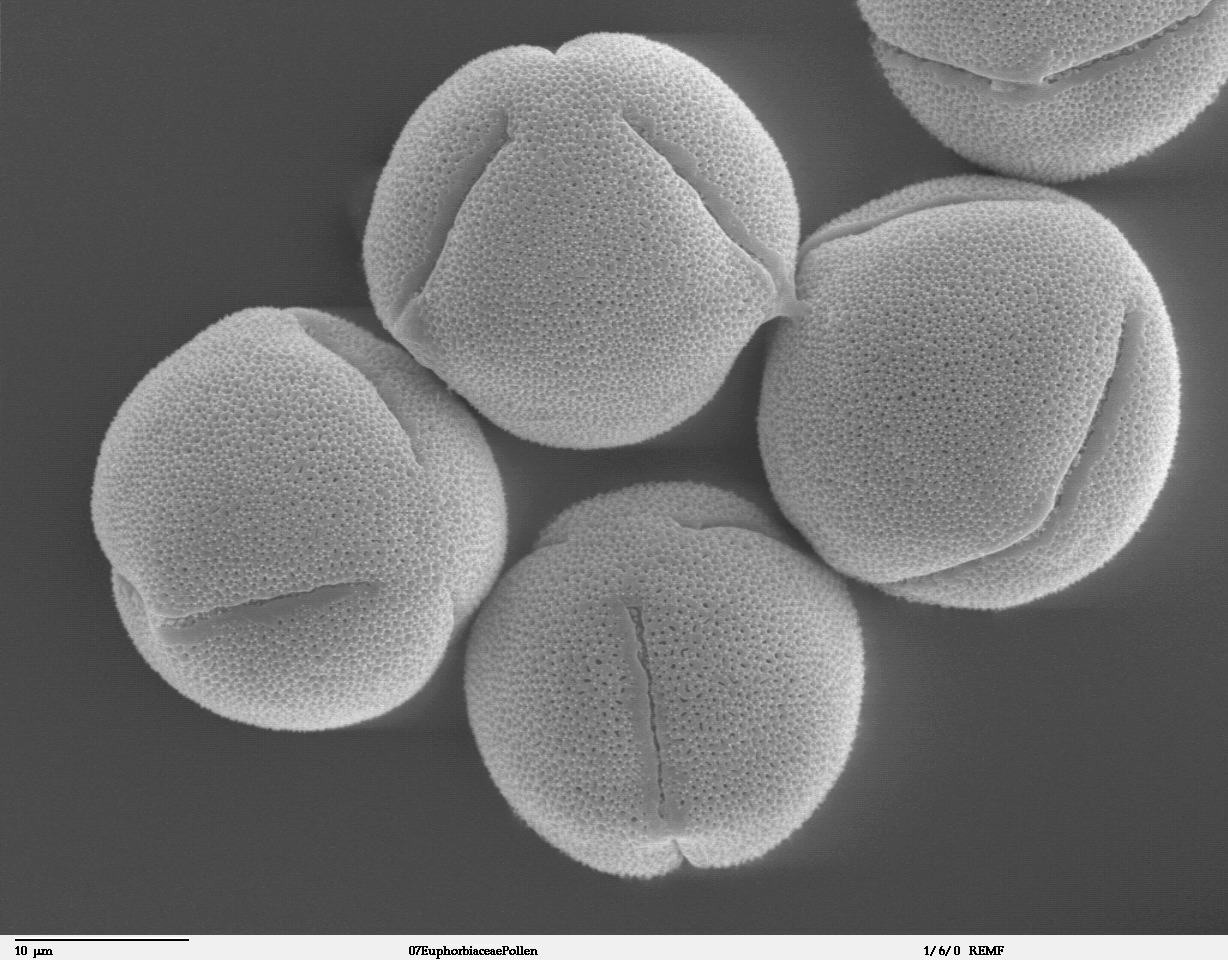
Tricolpate pollen of Ricinus

Under high magnification, spores often have complex patterns or ornamentation on their exterior surfaces. A specialized terminology has been developed to describe features of such patterns. Some markings represent apertures, places where the tough outer coat of the spore can be penetrated when germination occurs. Spores can be categorized based on the position and number of these markings and apertures. Alete spores show no lines. In monolete spores, there is a single narrow line (laesura) on the spore. Indicating the prior contact of two spores that eventually separated. In trilete spores, each spore shows three narrow lines radiating from a center pole. This shows that four spores shared a common origin and were initially in contact with each other forming a tetrahedron. A wider aperture in the shape of a groove may be termed a colpus. The number of colpi distinguishes major groups of plants. Eudicots have tricolpate spores (i.e. spores with three colpi).

=== Spore tetrads and trilete spores ===
Envelope-enclosed spore tetrads are taken as the earliest evidence of plant life on land, dating from the mid-Ordovician (early Llanvirn, ~470 million years ago), a period from which no macrofossils have yet been recovered. Individual trilete spores resembling those of modern cryptogamic plants first appeared in the fossil record at the end of the Ordovician period.

== Dispersal ==
Spores being ejected by fungi

In fungi, both asexual and sexual spores or sporangiospores of many fungal species are actively dispersed by forcible ejection from their reproductive structures. This ejection ensures exit of the spores from the reproductive structures as well as travelling through the air over long distances. Many fungi thereby possess specialized mechanical and physiological mechanisms as well as spore-surface structures, such as hydrophobins, for spore ejection. These mechanisms include, for example, forcible discharge of ascospores enabled by the structure of the ascus and accumulation of osmolytes in the fluids of the ascus that lead to explosive discharge of the ascospores into the air.

The forcible discharge of single spores termed ballistospores involves formation of a small drop of water (Buller's drop), which upon contact with the spore leads to its projectile release with an initial acceleration of more than 10,000 g. Other fungi rely on alternative mechanisms for spore release, such as external mechanical forces, exemplified by puffballs. Attracting insects, such as flies, to fruiting structures, by virtue of their having lively colours and a putrid odour, for dispersal of fungal spores is yet another strategy, most prominently used by the stinkhorns.

In Common Smoothcap moss (Atrichum undulatum), the vibration of sporophyte has been shown to be an important mechanism for spore release.

In the case of spore-shedding vascular plants such as ferns, wind distribution of very light spores provides great capacity for dispersal. Also, spores are less subject to animal predation than seeds because they contain almost no food reserve; however they are more subject to fungal and bacterial predation. Their chief advantage is that, of all forms of progeny, spores require the least energy and materials to produce.

In the spikemoss Selaginella lepidophylla, dispersal is achieved in part by an unusual type of diaspore, a tumbleweed.

== Origin ==
Spores have been found in microfossils dating back to the mid-late Ordovician period. Two hypothesized initial functions of spores relate to whether they appeared before or after land plants. The heavily studied hypothesis is that spores were an adaptation of early land plant species, such as embryophytes, that allowed for plants to easily disperse while adapting to their non-aquatic environment. This is particularly supported by the observation of a thick spore wall in cryptospores. These spore walls would have protected potential offspring from novel weather elements. The second more recent hypothesis is that spores were an early predecessor of land plants and formed during errors in the meiosis of algae, a hypothesized early ancestor of land plants.

Whether spores arose before or after land plants, their contributions to topics in fields like paleontology and plant phylogenetics have been useful. The spores found in microfossils, also known as cryptospores, are well preserved due to the fixed material they are in as well as how abundant and widespread they were during their respective time periods. These microfossils are especially helpful when studying the early periods of earth as macrofossils such as plants are not common nor well preserved. Both cryptospores and modern spores have diverse morphology that indicate possible environmental conditions of earlier periods of Earth and evolutionary relationships of plant species.

== Gallery ==
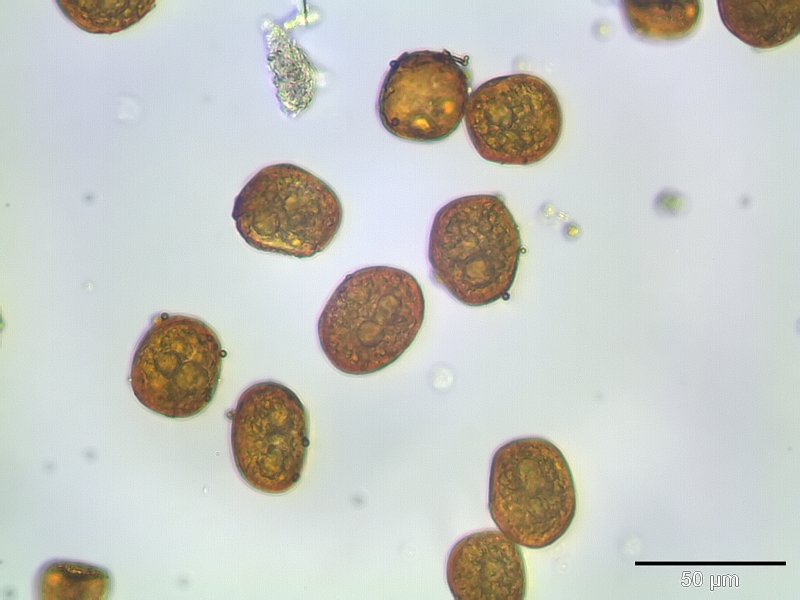
Spores of the moss Bartramia ithyphylla. (microscopic view, 400x)

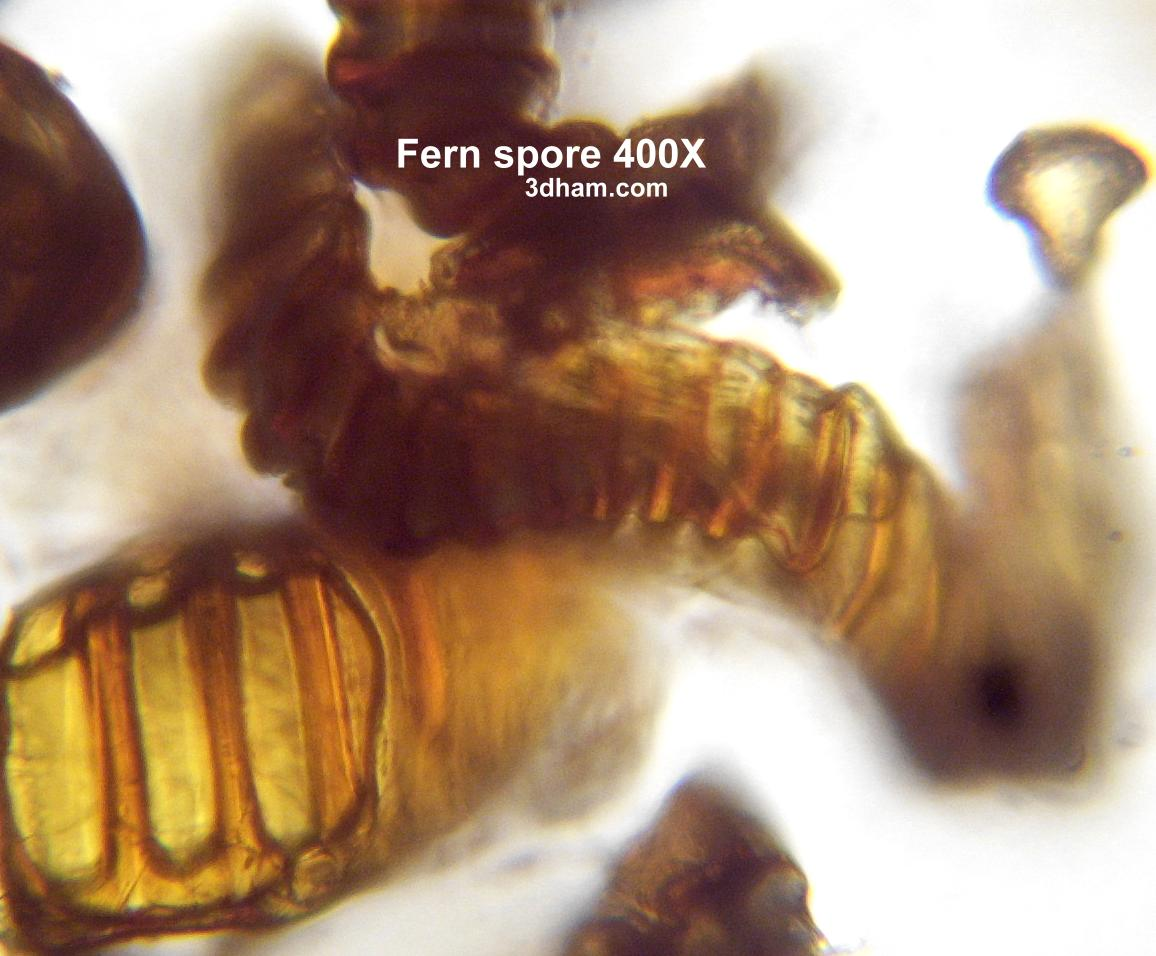
Dehisced fern sporangia. (microscopic view, no spores are visible)

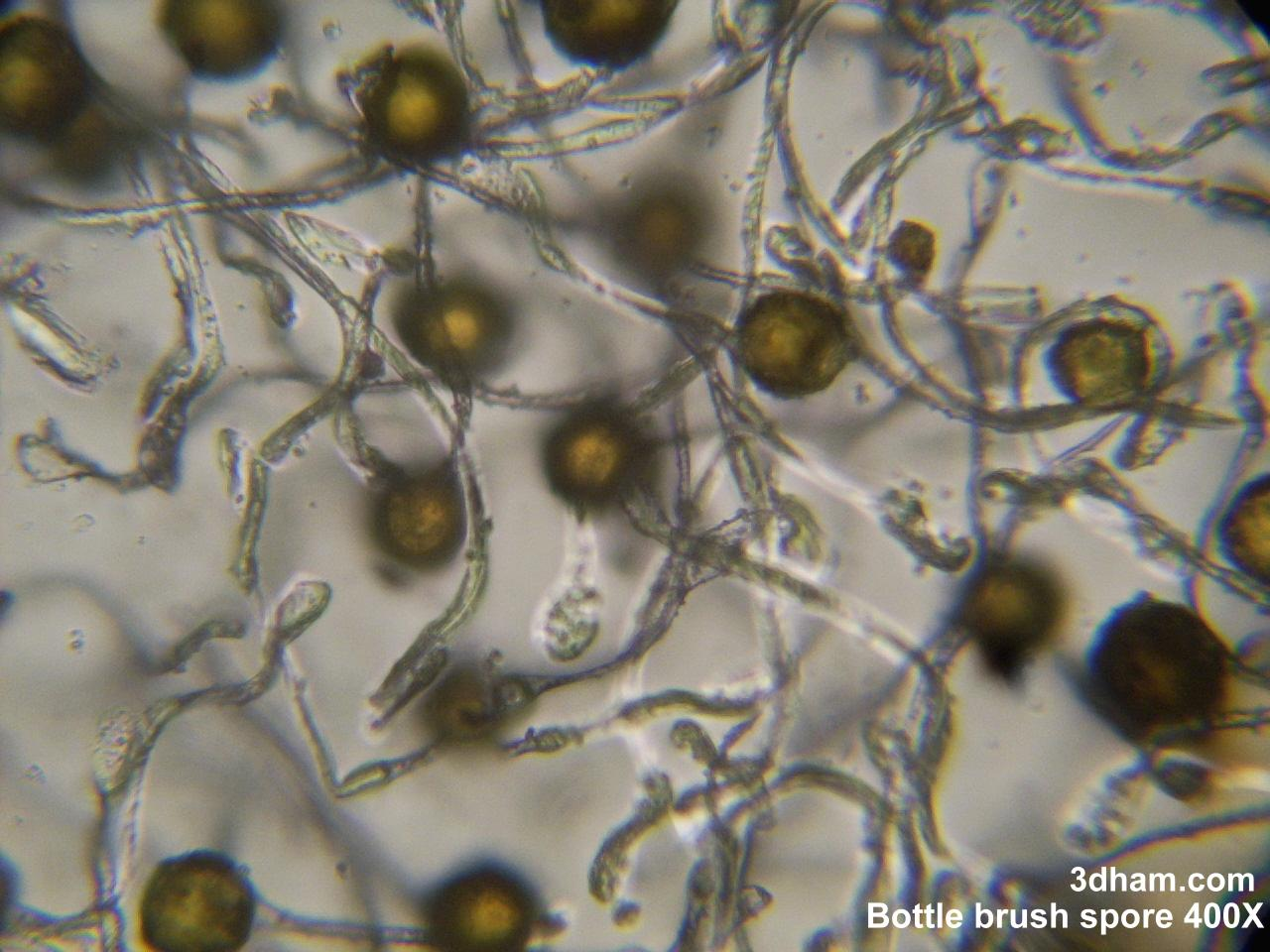
Spores and elaters from a horsetail. (Equisetum, microscopic view)

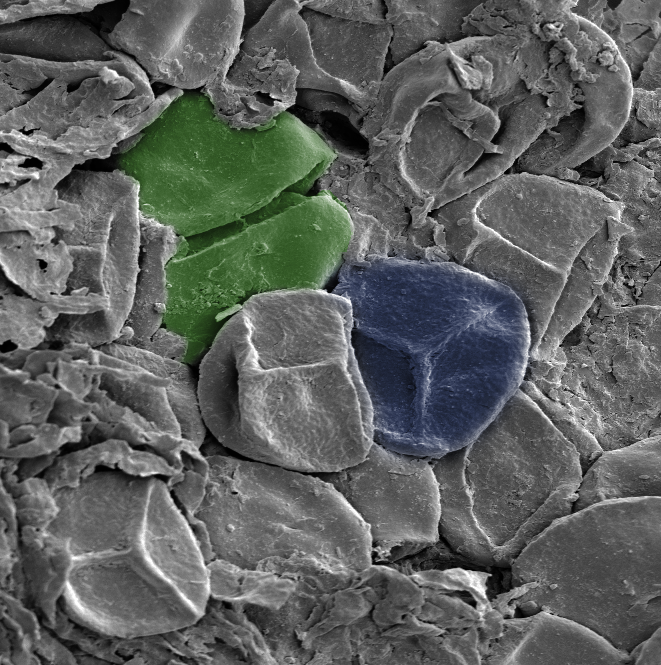
Fossil plant spores (Scylaspora) from Silurian deposits of Sweden

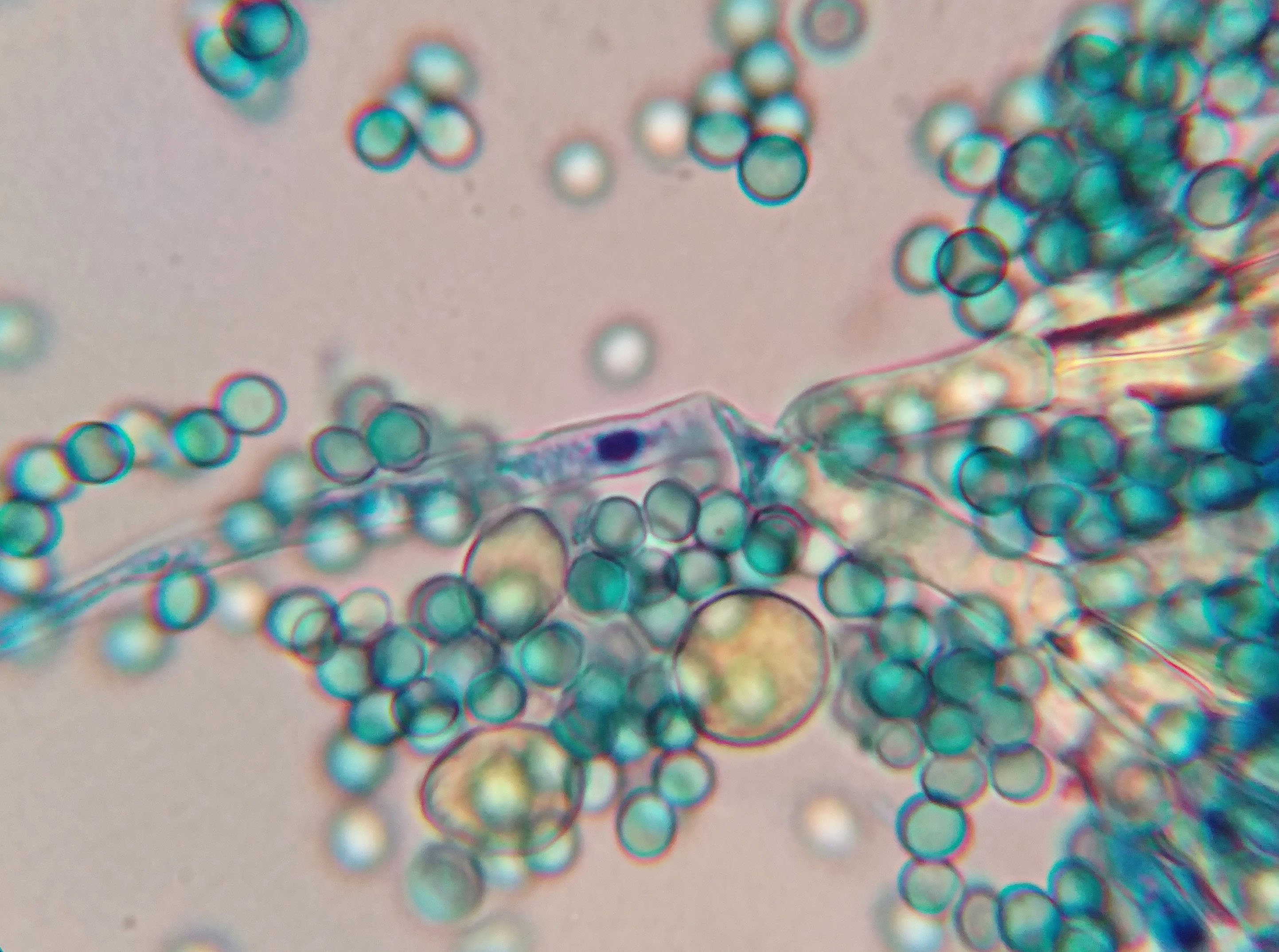
Fruit mold with spores and distinguishable cellular growth (2000x)

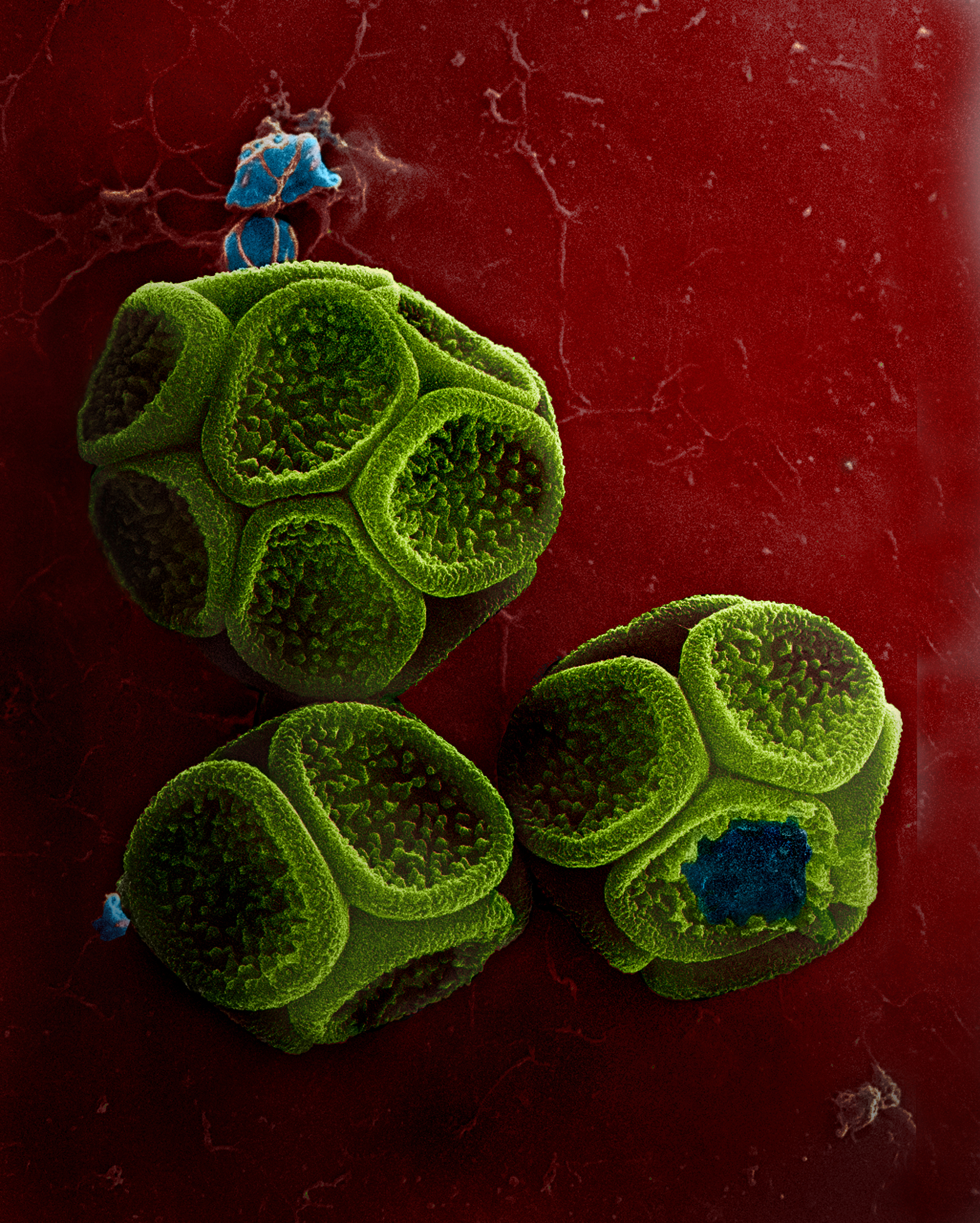
Spore clusters, formed inside sporangia of the slime mold Reticularia olivacea, from pine forests of eastern Ukraine

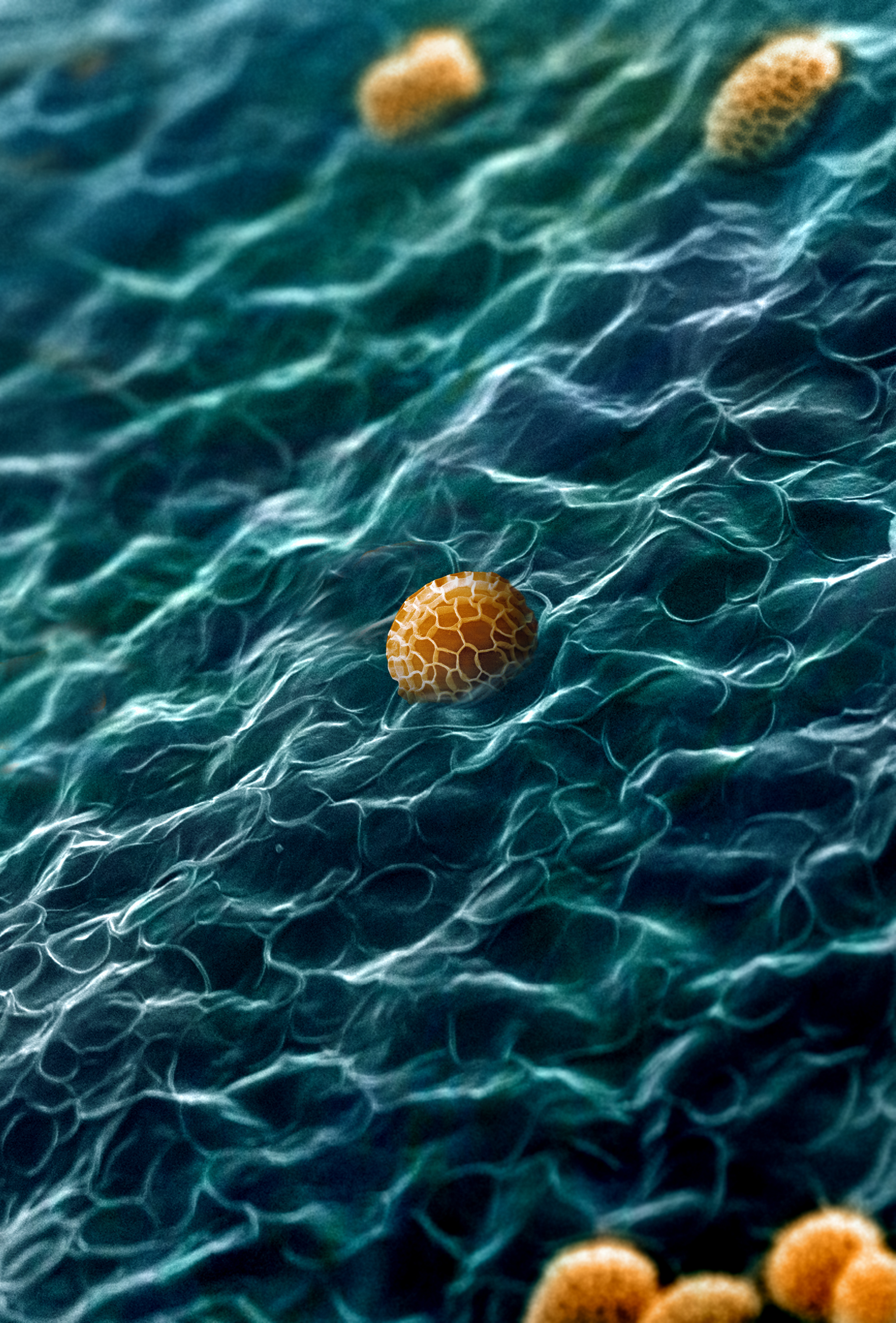
Internal surface of the peridium of the slime mold Tubifera dudkae with spores

== See also ==
- Aeroplankton
- Auxiliary cell
- Bioaerosol
- Cryptospore
