= Tumbleweed =

Plant structure, detaches and drifts

Lechenaultia divaricata

A tumbleweed is any structural part of the above-ground anatomy of a number of species of plants. It is a diaspore that, once mature and dry, detaches from its root or stem and rolls due to the force of the wind. It is also the name used for these types of plants.

In most such species, the tumbleweed is in effect the entire plant apart from the root system, but in other plants, a hollow fruit or inflorescence might detach instead. Xerophyte tumbleweed species occur most commonly in steppe and arid ecosystems, where frequent wind and the open environment permit rolling without prohibitive obstruction.

Apart from its primary vascular system and roots, the tissues of the tumbleweed structure are dead; their death is functional because it is necessary for the structure to degrade gradually and fall apart so that its seeds or spores can escape during the tumbling, or germinate after the tumbleweed has come to rest in a moist location. In the latter case, many species of tumbleweed open mechanically, releasing their seeds as they swell when they absorb water.

The tumbleweed diaspore disperses seeds, but the tumbleweed strategy is not limited to the seed plants; some species of spore-bearing cryptogams—such as Selaginella—form tumbleweeds, and some fungi that resemble puffballs dry out, break free of their attachments and are similarly tumbled by the wind, dispersing spores as they go.

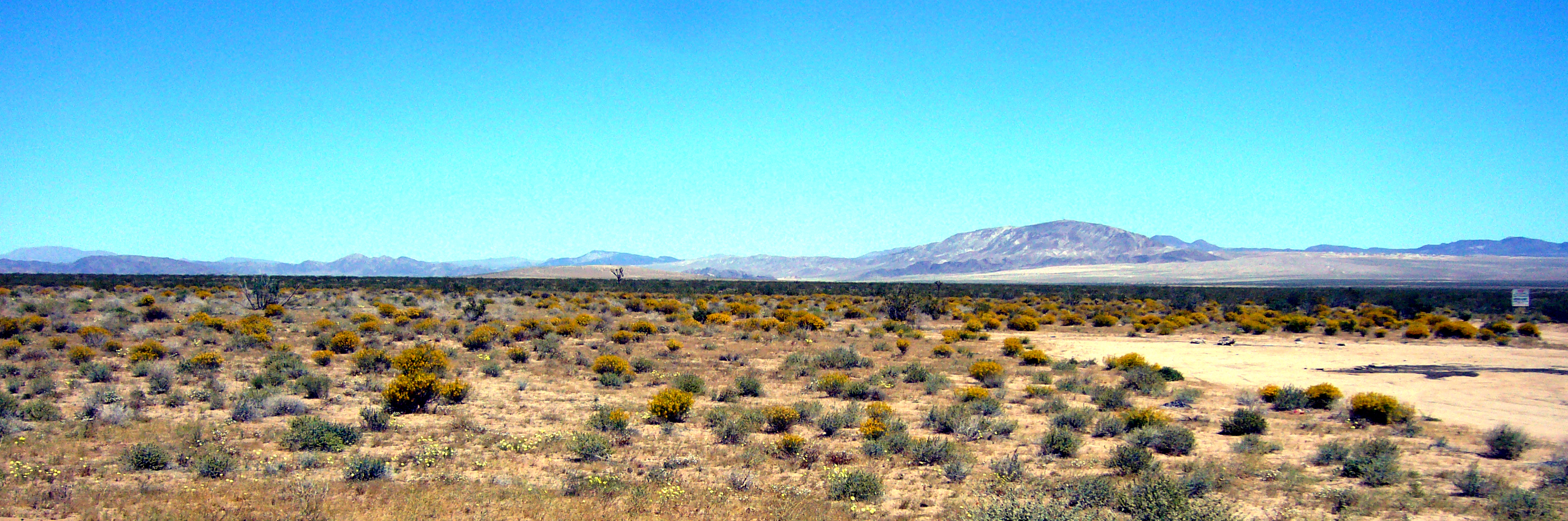
Young plant blooming in the Mojave Desert in April, after an extremely wet winter season

== Plants that form tumbleweeds ==
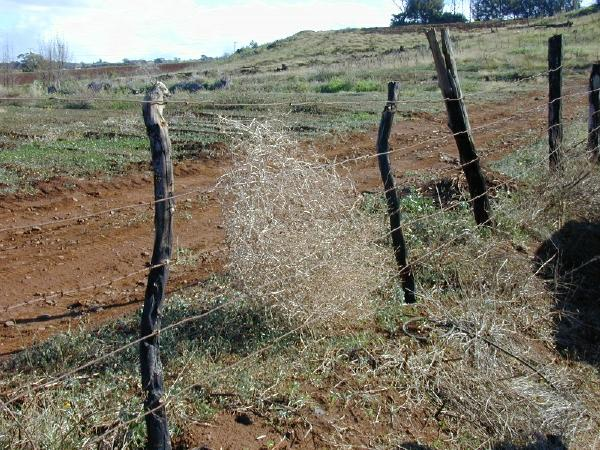
A Salsola tragus tumbleweed caught against a fence

The tumbleweed dispersal strategies are unusual among plants; most species disperse their seeds by other mechanisms. Many tumbleweeds establish themselves on broken soil as opportunistic agricultural weeds. Tumbleweeds have been recorded in the following plant groups:

- Amaranthaceae (including Chenopodiaceae)
- Amaryllidaceae
- Asphodelaceae
- Asteraceae
- Brassicaceae
- Boraginaceae
- Caryophyllaceae
- Fabaceae
- Lamiaceae
- Poaceae

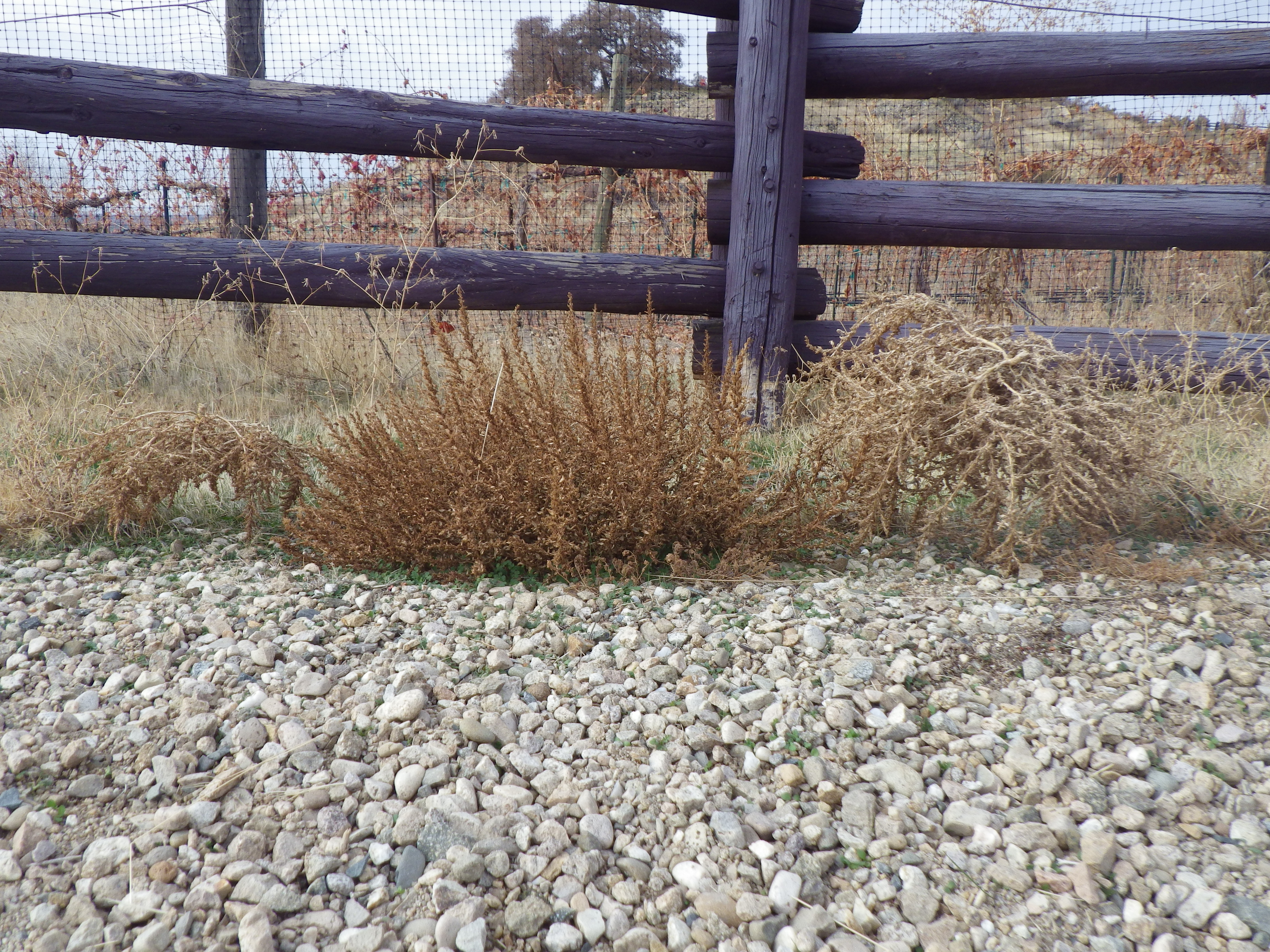
Amaranthus albus

In the family Amaranthaceae s.l. (i.e. broadly defined to include Chenopodiaceae), several annual species of the genus Salsola are tumbleweeds. They are thought to be native to Eurasia, but when their seeds entered North America in shipments of agricultural seeds, they became naturalized in large areas. In the cinema genre of Westerns, they have long been symbols of frontier areas. Salsola tragus is the so-called "Russian thistle". It is an annual plant that breaks off at the stem base when it dies, and forms a tumbleweed, dispersing its seeds as the wind rolls it along. It is said to have arrived in the United States in shipments of flax seeds to South Dakota, perhaps about 1870. It now is a noxious weed throughout North America, dominating disturbed habitats such as roadsides, cultivated fields, eroded slopes, and arid regions with sparse vegetation. Though it is a troublesome weed, Kali tragus also provides useful livestock forage on arid rangelands.

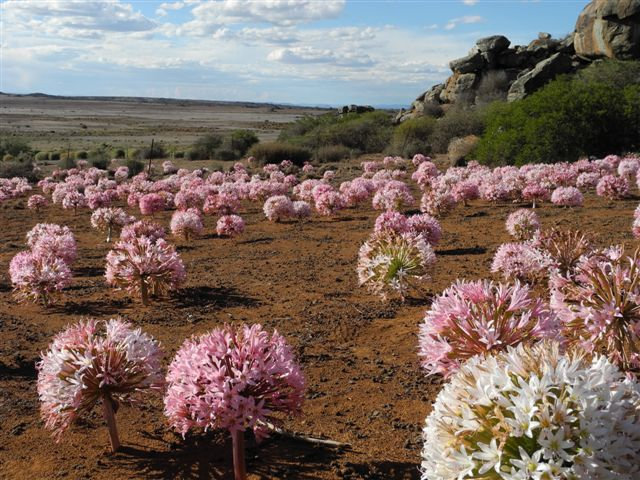
Brunsvigia bosmaniae in flower in the veld, showing the globular umbels of tumbleweed Amaryllidaceae

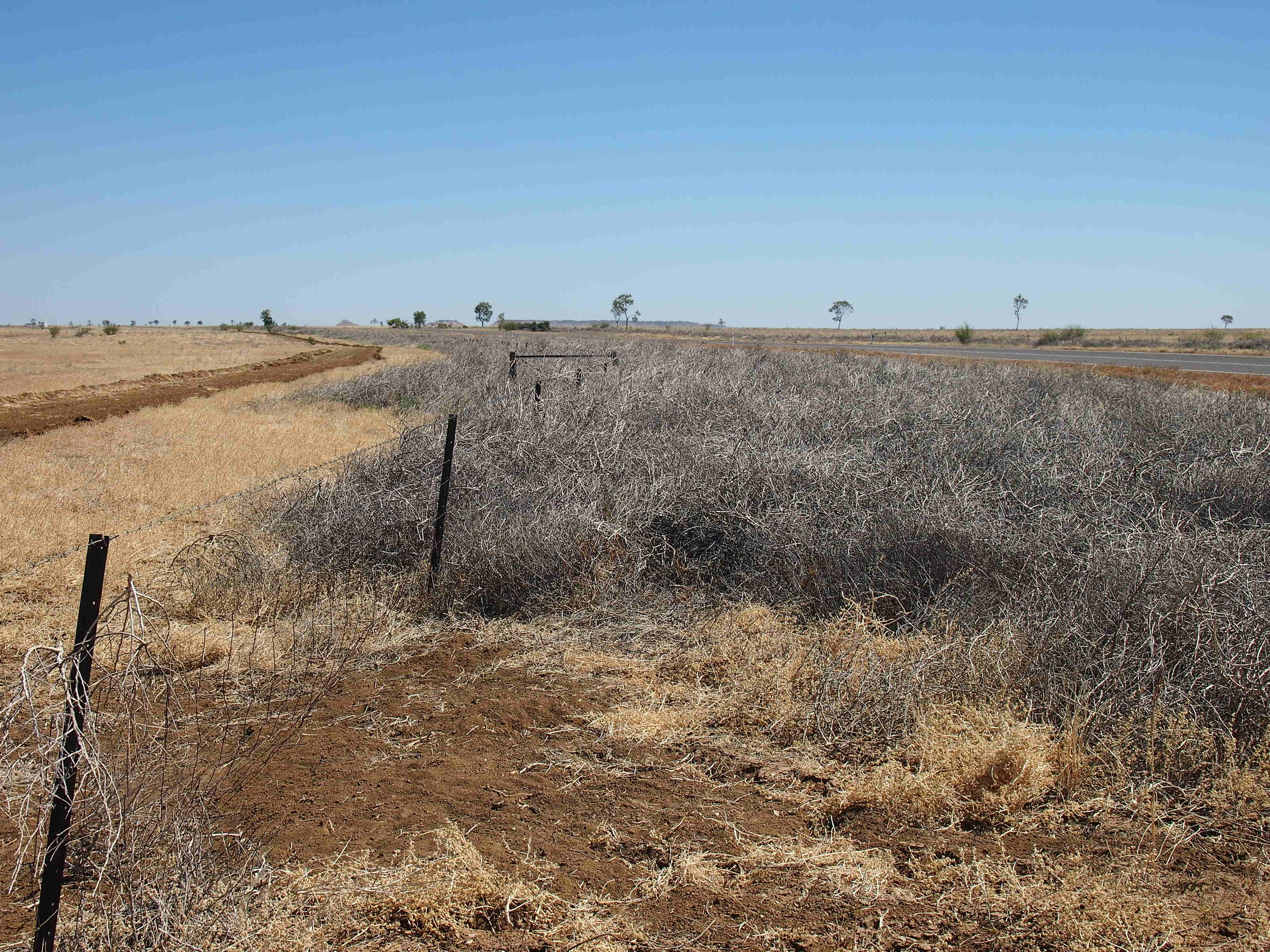
Mass of Salsola tumbleweeds caught behind a fence

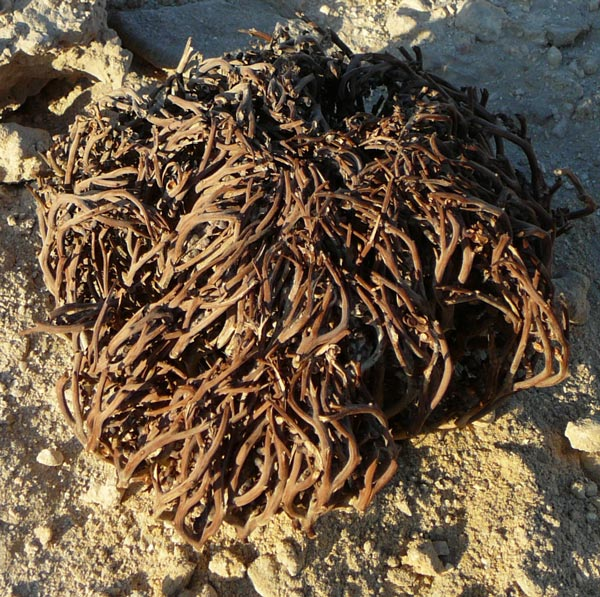
Anastatica, a North African desert tumbleweed

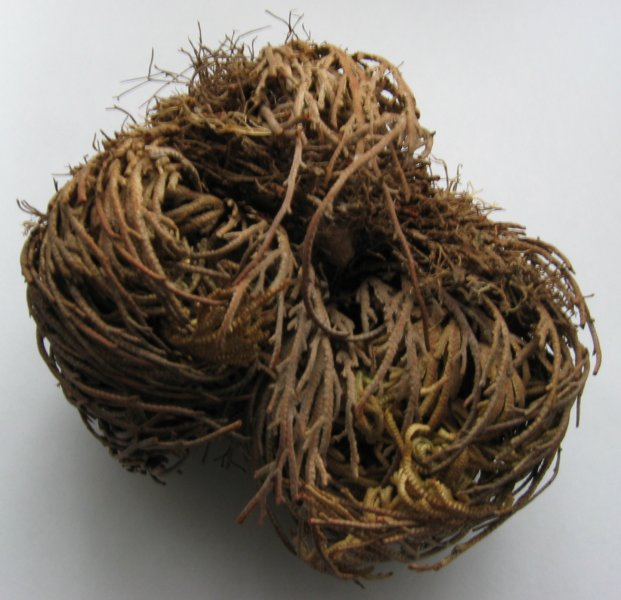
Selaginella lepidophylla, a North American desert tumbleweed

Other members of the Amaranthaceae (s.l.) that form tumbleweeds include Kochia species, Cycloloma atriplicifolium, and Corispermum hyssopifolium, which are called plains tumbleweed. Atriplex rosea is called the tumbling oracle or tumbling orach.

Among the Amaranthaceae (s.s.) that form tumbleweeds, there are several species of Amaranthus, such as Amaranthus albus, native to Central America but invasive in Europe, Asia, and Australia; and Amaranthus graecizans, native to Africa, but naturalized in North America. Amaranthus retroflexus, which is indigenous to tropical North and South America, has become nearly cosmopolitan largely as a weed, but like many other species of Amaranthus, it also is widely valued as animal forage and as human food, though it should be utilised with caution to avoid toxicity.

Several Southern African genera in the family Amaryllidaceae produce highly optimised tumbleweeds; their inflorescences are globular umbels with long, spoke-like pedicels, either effectively at ground level, or breaking off once the stems are dry. When the seeds are about ripe, the fruit remain attached to the peduncles, but the stem of the umbel detaches, permitting the globes to roll about in the wind. The light, open, globular structures form very effective tumbleweed diaspores, dropping their seeds usually within a few days as the follicles fail under the wear of rolling. The seeds are fleshy, short-lived, and germinate rapidly where they land. Being poisonous and distasteful, they are not attractive to candidate transport animals, so the rolling diaspore is a very effective dispersal strategy for such plants. Genera with this means of seed dispersal include Ammocharis, Boophone, Crossyne and Brunsvigia.

Some species of the Apiaceae form tumbleweeds from their flower umbels, much as some Amaryllidaceae do.

In the Asteraceae, the knapweed Centaurea diffusa forms tumbleweeds. It is native to Eurasia and is naturalized in much of North America. Also in the Asteraceae, Lessingia glandulifera, native to America, sometimes forms tumbleweeds; it grows on sandy soils in desert areas, chaparral, and open pine forests of the western United States.

In the Brassicaceae, Sisymbrium altissimum, Crambe maritima, Lepidium, and a resurrection plant, Anastatica form tumbleweeds.

In the Caryophyllaceae, the garden plant "baby's-breath" (Gypsophila paniculata), produces a dry inflorescence that forms tumbleweeds. In parts of central and western North America, it has become a common weed in many locations including hayfields and pastures.

In the legume family (Fabaceae), Baptisia tinctoria and some species of Psoralea produce tumbleweeds. In Psoralea the tumbleweed detaches from the plant by abscission of the stem.

In the Plantaginaceae, Plantago cretica forms tumbleweeds.

Inflorescences that act as tumbling diaspores occur in some grasses, including Schedonnardus paniculatus and some species of Eragrostis and Aristida. In these plants, the inflorescences break off and tumble in the wind instead of the whole plant, much as happens in some of the Apiaceae and Amaryllidaceae. The species of Spinifex from Southeast Asia are prominent examples of this dispersal adaptation. These grasses are often called tumble-grasses, including such species as Panicum capillare and Eragrostis pectinacea in the United States.

In the Solanaceae, Solanum rostratum forms tumbleweeds.

Wind dispersed fruits that tumble or roll on the ground, sometimes known as "tumble fruits", are rare. Some are technically achenes. Highly inflated indehiscent fruits that may facilitate tumbling include Alyssopsis, Coluteocarpus, Physoptychis, Sutherlandia, and Physaria.

Very similar in habit to Anastatica, but practically unrelated, are the spore-bearing Selaginella lepidophylla (a lycopod) and earthstar mushroom family (Geastraceae). All of these curl into a ball when dry and uncurl when moistened.

Bovista, a genus of puffball, uses essentially the same dispersal strategy.

== Environmental effects ==
The United States Department of Agriculture classified the ubiquitous tumbleweeds of Salsola tragus as a non-native and extremely invasive plant in the United States. They are considered noxious in nature and detrimental in many ways. Tumbleweeds thrive in disturbed soil and are a major contributor to native plant extinctions and wildfires, being highly flammable and bouncing over or rapidly growing in land cleared of vegetation between fields or areas of forest as firebreaks. Despite over a century of cooperation between Mexican, Canadian, and US governments to combat the species, tumbleweeds are found in most regions of North America.

Some ruderal species that disperse as tumbleweeds are serious weeds that significantly promote wind erosion in open regions. Their effects are particularly harmful to dry-land agricultural operations where the outside application of additional moisture is not practicable. One study showed that a single Russian thistle can remove up to 170 L (44 US gallons) of water from the soil in competition with a wheat crop in one year. The amount of water removed from fallow land more subject to erosion would be even more damaging.

It sometimes happens that species of large tumbleweed, especially if thorny, can form aggregations that are physically hazardous and can block roads and cover buildings and vehicles. This can happen where fences and similar obstacles cause the accumulation, but the weeds can also entangle each other until they form piles that can no longer roll. Such piles can be a serious threat to trapped vehicles or buildings and their occupants, particularly because they are dry and flammable. Examples of enveloped buildings and vehicles have been documented mainly in the Western regions of the US. In residential areas, an example was the town of Mobridge, South Dakota, where in 1989 tens of tons of large tumbleweeds ("Russian thistles") that had matured in the dry bed of nearby Lake Oahe buried many houses so deeply that mechanical equipment was necessary to remove it, release occupants and counter the fire hazard.

There was a significant outbreak of Panicum effusum in the Australian town of Wangaratta in February 2016 that attracted international attention. The seed heads of the weed, known locally as "hairy panic", had piled several meters deep in some places, forcing residents to spend several hours removing it to regain access to their homes. The local council subsequently indicated it was considering attaching large vacuums to street-sweepers in an attempt to control the outbreak.

On 18 April 2018, strong winds and neglected maintenance of neighboring private land brought a large number of tumbleweeds into Victorville, California. Approximately 100 to 150 homes required help from public services after their entryways were at least partly blocked. The local fire department participated in the cleanup as the influx of tumbleweeds presented both a safety and fire hazard.

A similar incident occurred on 31 December 2019, when high winds dislodged a large number of tumbleweeds on the Hanford Reservation northwest of Richland, Washington. The tumbleweeds piled up 4.5 to 6 m (15 to 20 feet) deep in some areas, burying cars and trucks and closing Washington State Route 240 for ten hours while road crews used snowplows to remove the tumbleweeds.

Tumbleweeds have been observed causing problems with wastewater treatment plants. In some cases of inadequate fencing, they can get entangled in electromechanical equipment such as clarifiers and mechanical aerators leading to increased energy use and labor cost associated with operating and cleaning.

Some invertebrates develop inside tumbleweeds and disperse as phytochores via the wind.

== Society and culture ==
Originating in the Western genre, tumbleweeds are frequently used as a trope in films and TV shows. In shots set in a desolate and deserted place, or generally in a locale with little activity, tumbleweeds may be seen rolling across the scenery. This motif has become clichéd, with the result that it is nowadays primarily used with humorous intent – for example when a short but embarrassing moment of silence occurs during a scene. One of the best-known uses of tumbleweed in cinema is in the opening sequence of The Big Lebowski (1998), where it symbolizes the "drifting" nature of the main character.

The city of Chandler, Arizona marks the holiday season by building a tumbleweed tree for Christmas.

Bramblin and Brambleghast are Pokémon based on tumbleweeds.

Once dry and uprooted, tumbleweeds form steppicursors that, driven by the wind, roll on the lands of Southern California, Arizona, Nevada, Utah, New Mexico, Texas, northwestern Mexico, and most of the Mexican territory just south of the border. In the area of Mexicali they are called cachanillas, which is also a demonym for those born and residing in that city.

== Bibliography ==
- Baker, Dirk V. (2007). Dispersal of an Invasive Tumbleweed (PhD). Fort Collins: Colorado State University.
