= Diaspore (botany) =

Plant seed or spore and tissues that aid dispersal

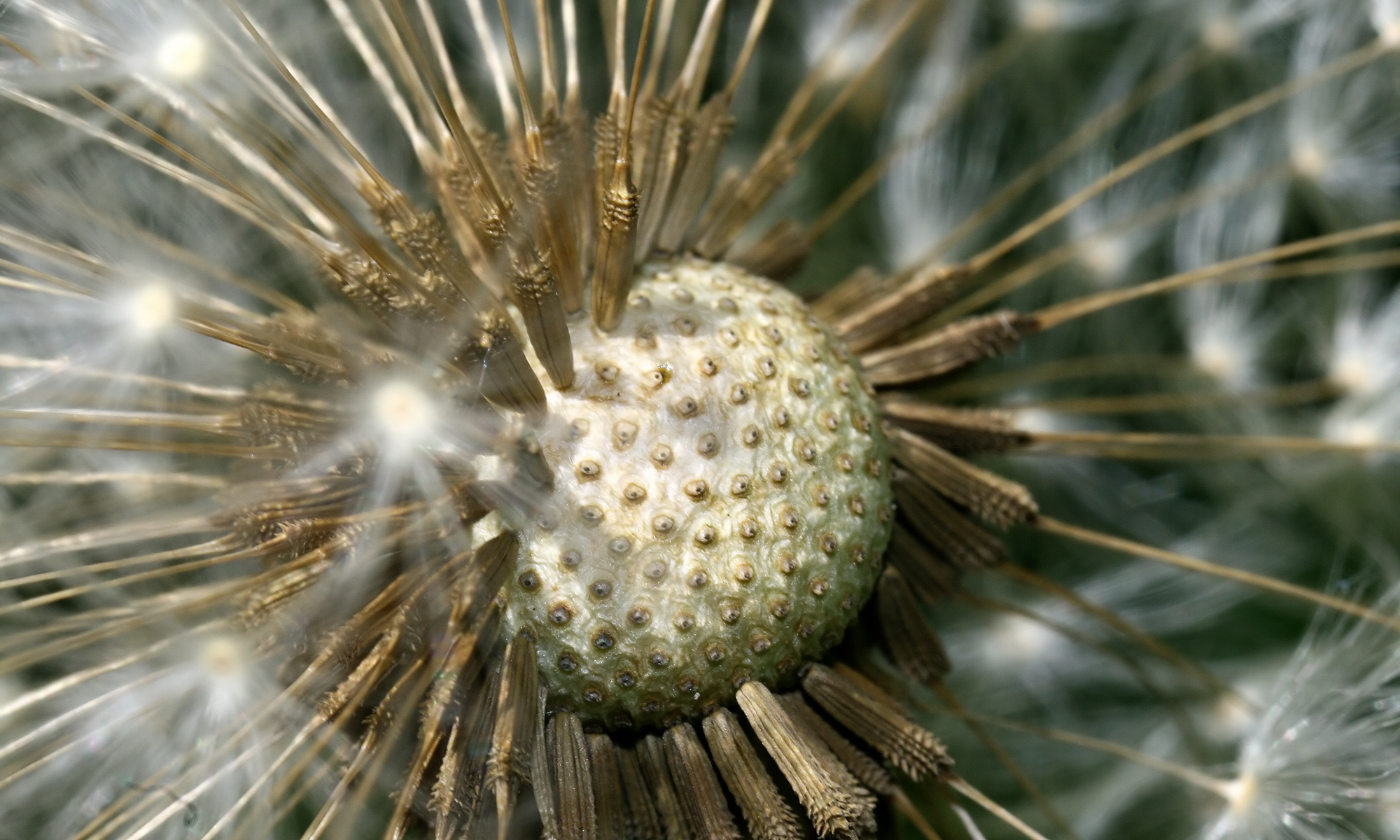
Achenes of a dandelion, each attached to a pappus (Taraxacum)

In botany, a diaspore is a plant dispersal unit consisting of a seed or spore plus any additional tissues that assist dispersal. Examples of such additional structures include elaiosomes, fruits, pseudofruits or arils, as well as pappi. In a few plants, the diaspore is a tumbleweed and comprises most of the plant.

Diaspores are common in weedy and ruderal species. Collectively, diaspores, seeds, and spores that have been modified for migration are known as disseminules.

== Role in dispersal ==
A diaspore of seed plus elaiosome is a common adaptation to seed dispersal by ants (myrmecochory). This is most notable in Australian and South African sclerophyll plant communities. Typically, ants carry the diaspore to their nest, where they may eat the elaiosome and discard the seed, and the seed may subsequently germinate.

A diaspore of seed(s) plus fruit is common in plants dispersed by frugivores. Fruit-eating bats typically carry the diaspore to a favorite perch, where they eat the fruit and discard the seed. Fruit-eating birds typically swallow small seeds but, like bats, may carry larger seeded fruits to a perch where they eat the fruit and discard the seed. Diaspores such as achenes and samarae are dispersed primarily by wind; samaras are dispersed also by sailing or tumbling as they fall in still air. Drift fruits and some others are dispersed by water.

Tumbleweeds are dispersed by wind, sometimes over very long distances. These occur in a variety of weedy and ruderal species native to steppes and deserts. Grasses have various units of dispersal: rarely the caryopsis alone, often a diaspore. Disarticulation occurs below, between, or above the glumes and at all nodes. Although in some species the diaspore is a foxtail, in a few (the "tumble grasses") it is like a tumbleweed.

Some invertebrates develop inside diaspores and are dispersed as phytochores.

== See also ==
- Foxtail (diaspore)
- Lichen
- Propagule
- Seedbank
- Soil seed bank
- Sporogenesis
- Wolffia
