= Foxtail (diaspore) =

Dry spikelet or spikelet cluster of some grasses

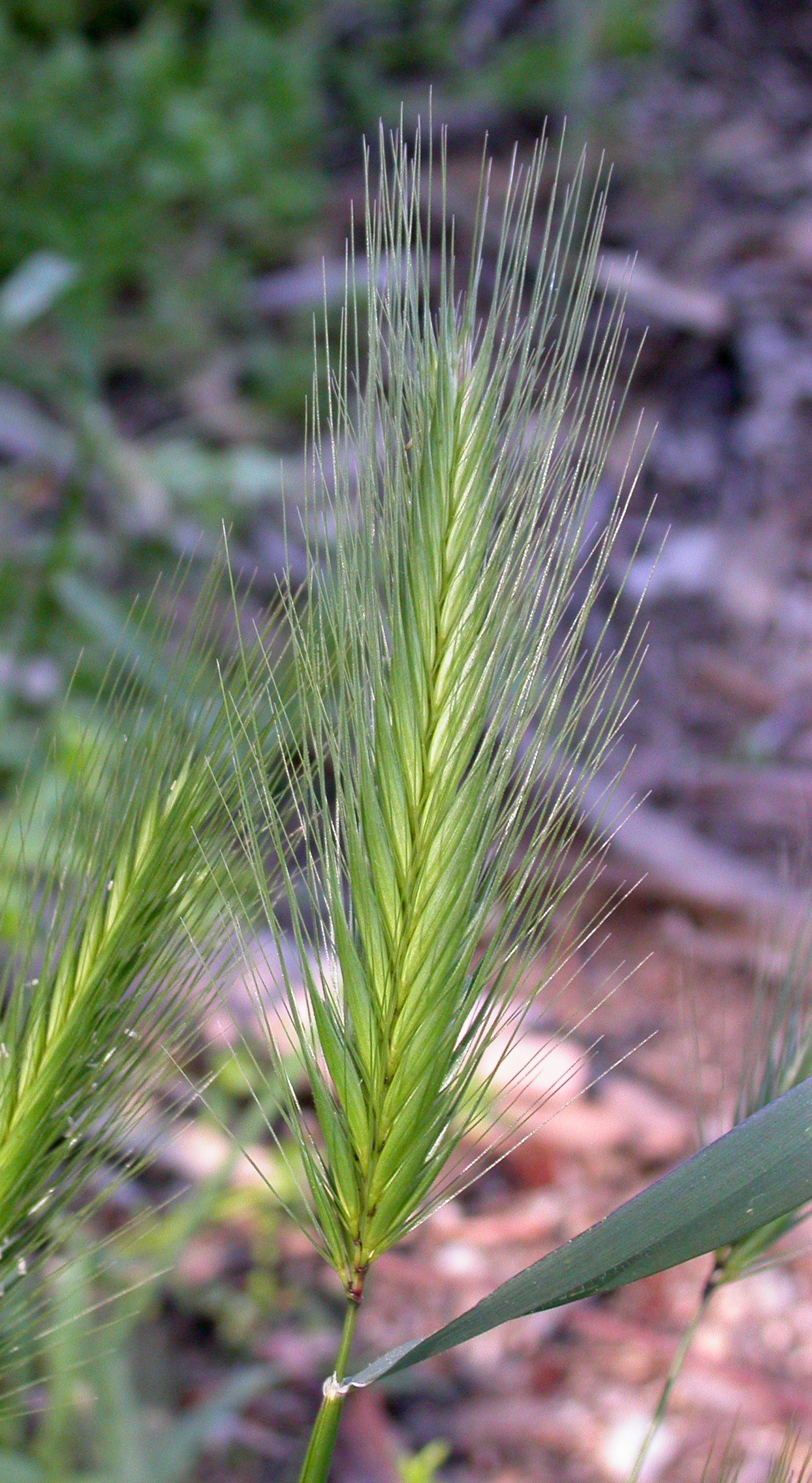
Hordeum murinum, a common source of foxtails in many areas

A foxtail is a spikelet or cluster of a grass, that serves to disperse its seeds as a unit. Thus, the foxtail is a type of diaspore or plant dispersal unit. Some grasses that produce a foxtail are themselves called "foxtail", also "spear grass". They can become a health hazard for dogs, cats, and other domestic animals, and a nuisance for people.

== Sources ==
The name "foxtail" is applied to a number of grasses that have bushy spikes of spikelets that resemble the tail of a fox. Not all of these are hazardous; most of the hazardous ones are in the genus Hordeum, and are also called "wild barley".

Grasses known as foxtails include:

- Alopecurus (foxtail grasses — the scientific name literally means "fox tail")
- Bromus madritensis (foxtail brome)
- Hordeum jubatum (foxtail barley)
- Setaria (foxtail millets)

Other grasses also produce hazardous spikelets. The spikelets are sometimes called foxtails, even though the grasses are not.

== Structure ==
All foxtails have a hardened tip, sometimes called a "callus", and retrorse barbs, pointing away from the tip of the callus. Wild barleys have clusters of three spikelets, and the callus is the portion of the rachis to which they attach. In other grasses, such as needlegrass and brome grasses, the foxtail consists of a single spikelet, with the callus being the hardened lemma tip. Retrorse barbs can be found on the callus, the lemmas, and the awns.

The spikelets or spikelet clusters of foxtails are adapted for animal dispersal: The foxtails disarticulate easily, the barbs cause the foxtail to cling to fur, and movement of the animal causes the foxtail to burrow into the fur, since the barbs permit it to move only in the direction of the callus. In wild mammals that inhabit the native ranges of foxtail grasses, the fur is ordinarily short enough that the foxtails will eventually become dislodged, dispersing the seed.

== Hazard ==
Foxtails can become a health hazard for pets and other domestic animals, and a nuisance for people.

In dogs, cats, and other domestic animals the foxtails can become irreversibly lodged. Foxtails can also enter the nostrils and ear canals of many mammals. In all these cases, the foxtail can physically enter the body through muscular movements or, in the case of nostrils, air flow, can cause the foxtails to continue to burrow through soft tissues and organs, causing infection and physical disruption, which in some cases can result in death. In humans, foxtails can work through clothing, particularly fabric shoes and socks, causing discomfort to people while walking.

Foxtails are a problem beginning when the grass inflorescences begin to disarticulate, and ending when the spikelets or spikelet clusters are mechanically abraded or incorporated into the soil, turf, or leaf litter. In some habitats, this can be a matter of weeks, but in others it may require months, especially if different species flower and fruit at different times during the season.

Foxtails that have progressed no further than surface lesions may be removed and the lesion treated with antiseptic and bandaged if necessary. Once a foxtail has passed beneath the skin, dogs and cats are often treated with systemic antibiotics, and the foxtail either allowed to encyst and degrade, or in the case of actual or imminent organ damage, removed surgically. However, surgical removal can be problematic, since foxtails cannot easily be imaged by x-ray or ultrasound. Foxtails embedded in the nostrils can migrate into the nasal turbinates, causing intense distress, and in rare cases into the brain. Foxtails in the ear canal can puncture the eardrum and enter the middle ear, causing hearing loss.

Combing of fur removes foxtails along with burrs and other detritus, but potentially the most dangerous foxtails are found in areas easily missed: the axillae, between the toes, and in nostrils and ear canals. Occasionally they can even lodge in the conjunctiva under the eyelid.

Many wild barley species are weeds in disturbed habitats, and their growth is encouraged by foot traffic of humans and domestic animals. Control methods consist of restricting traffic to established paths, and eradication of wild barley by mechanical removal or herbicide. Some other foxtail-producing grasses, especially needlegrasses, are dominant species in stable grassland habitats. Control attempts in these cases can actually be counterproductive, creating disturbed habitats where wild barleys may thrive.

== Gallery ==
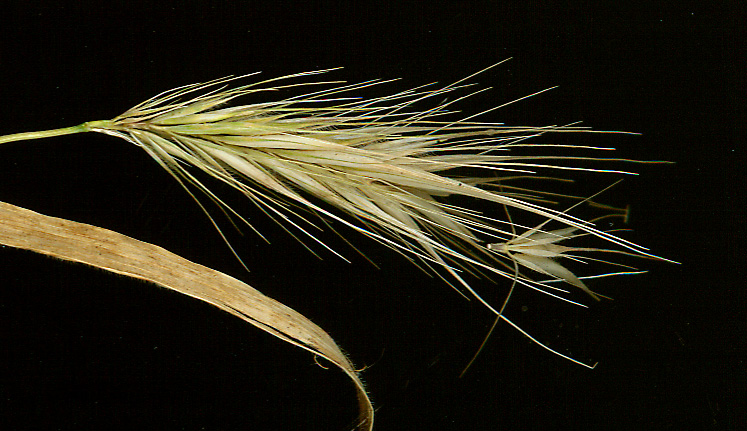
The spike of Hordeum murinum disarticulates into clusters of three spikelets

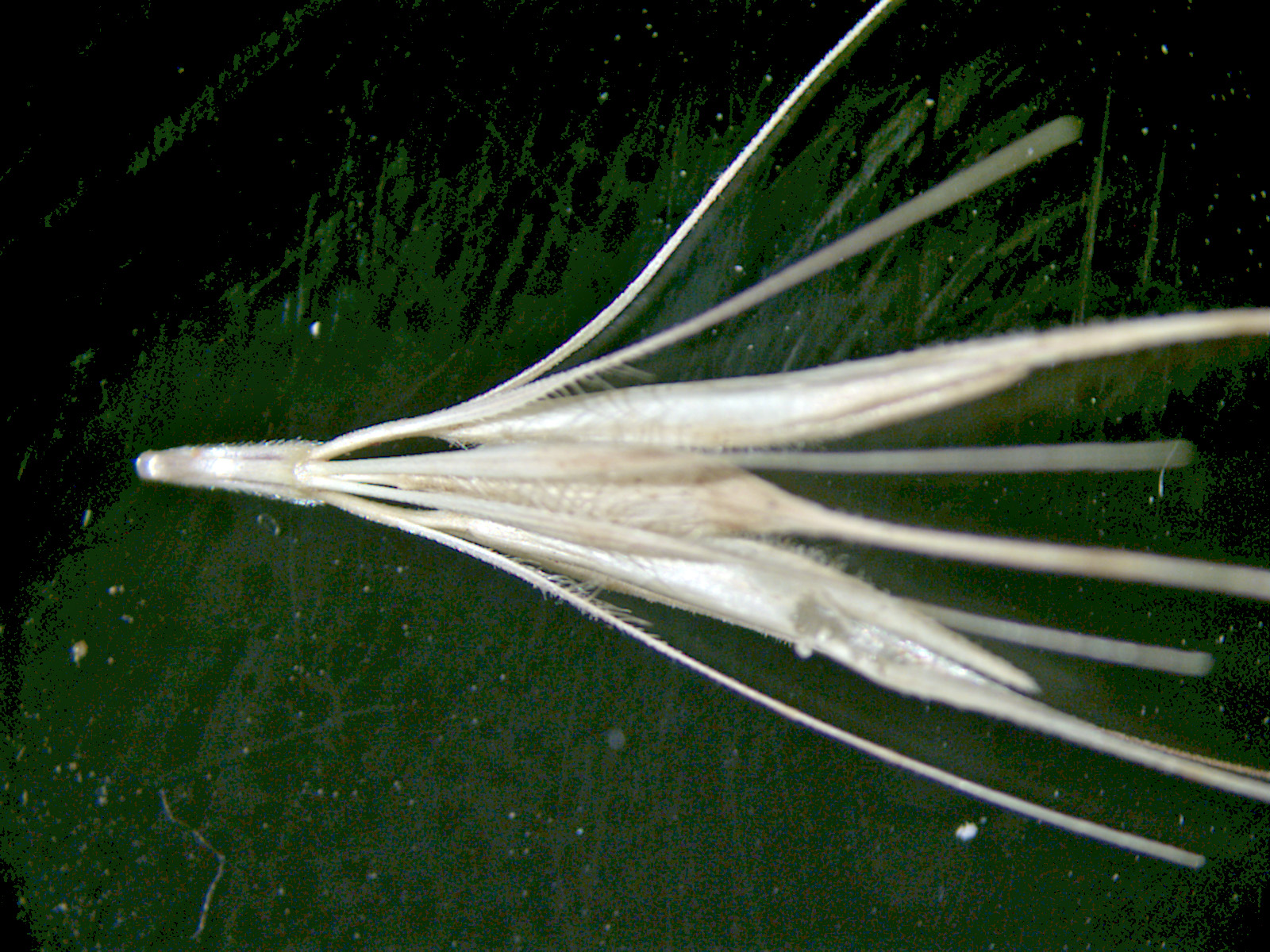
Each spikelet cluster is held together by a portion of the rachis

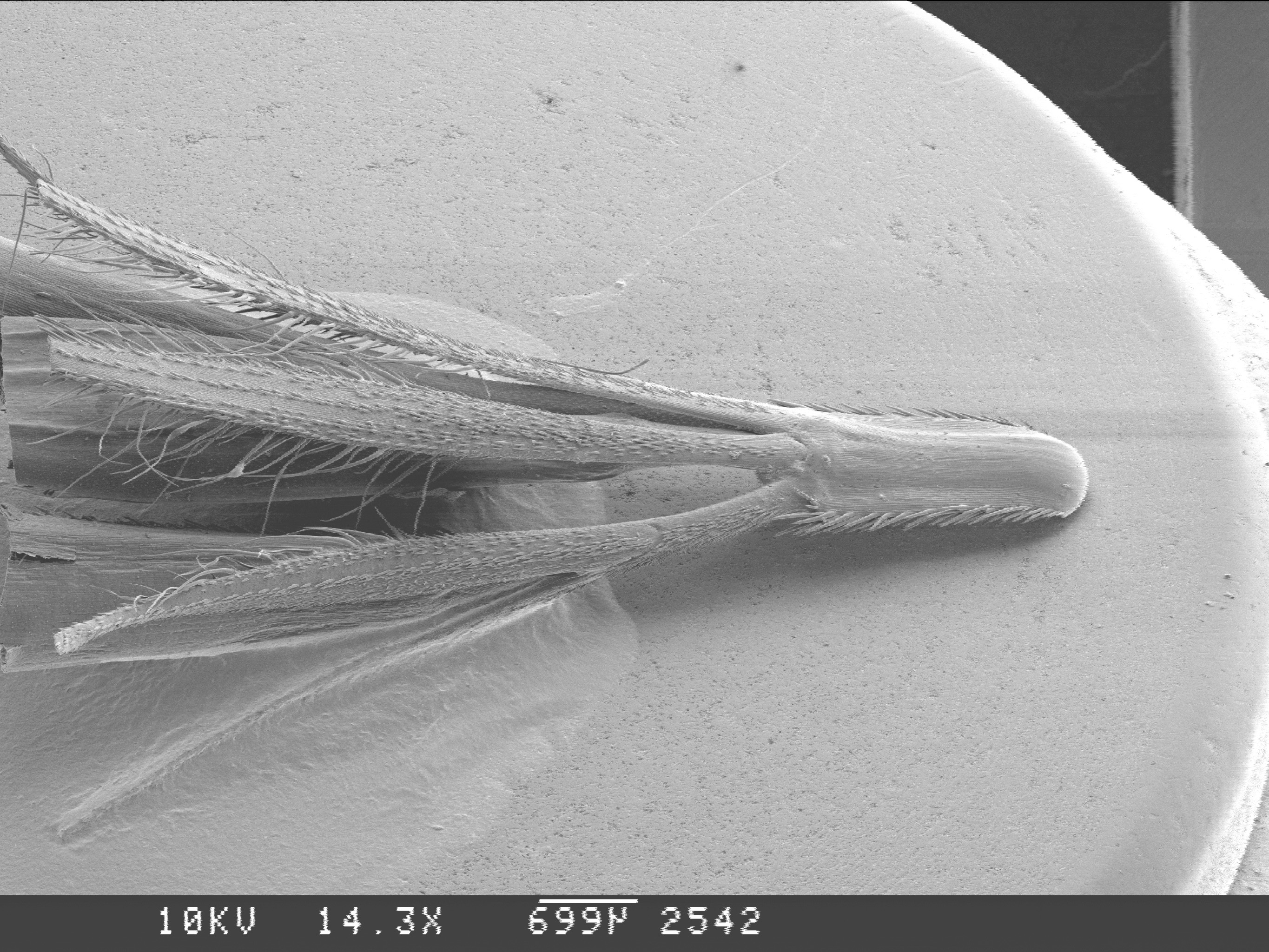
Spikelet cluster viewed by scanning electron microscope

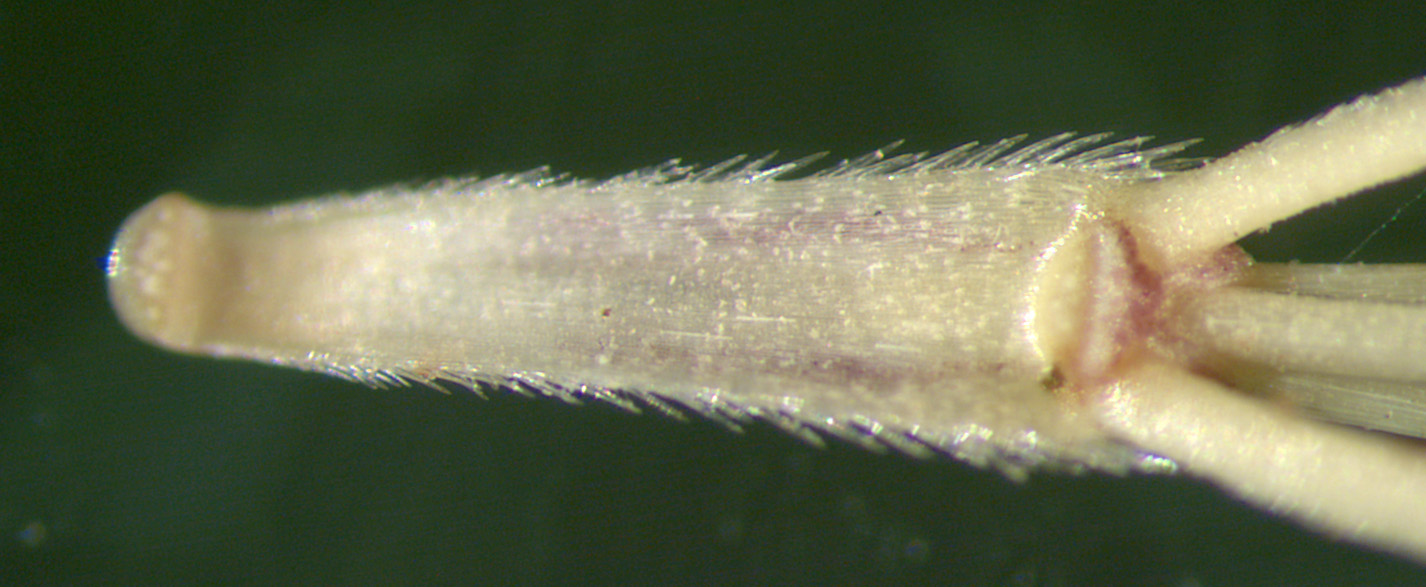
The rachis segment, sometimes called a "callus", is hardened, and covered with retrorse barbs

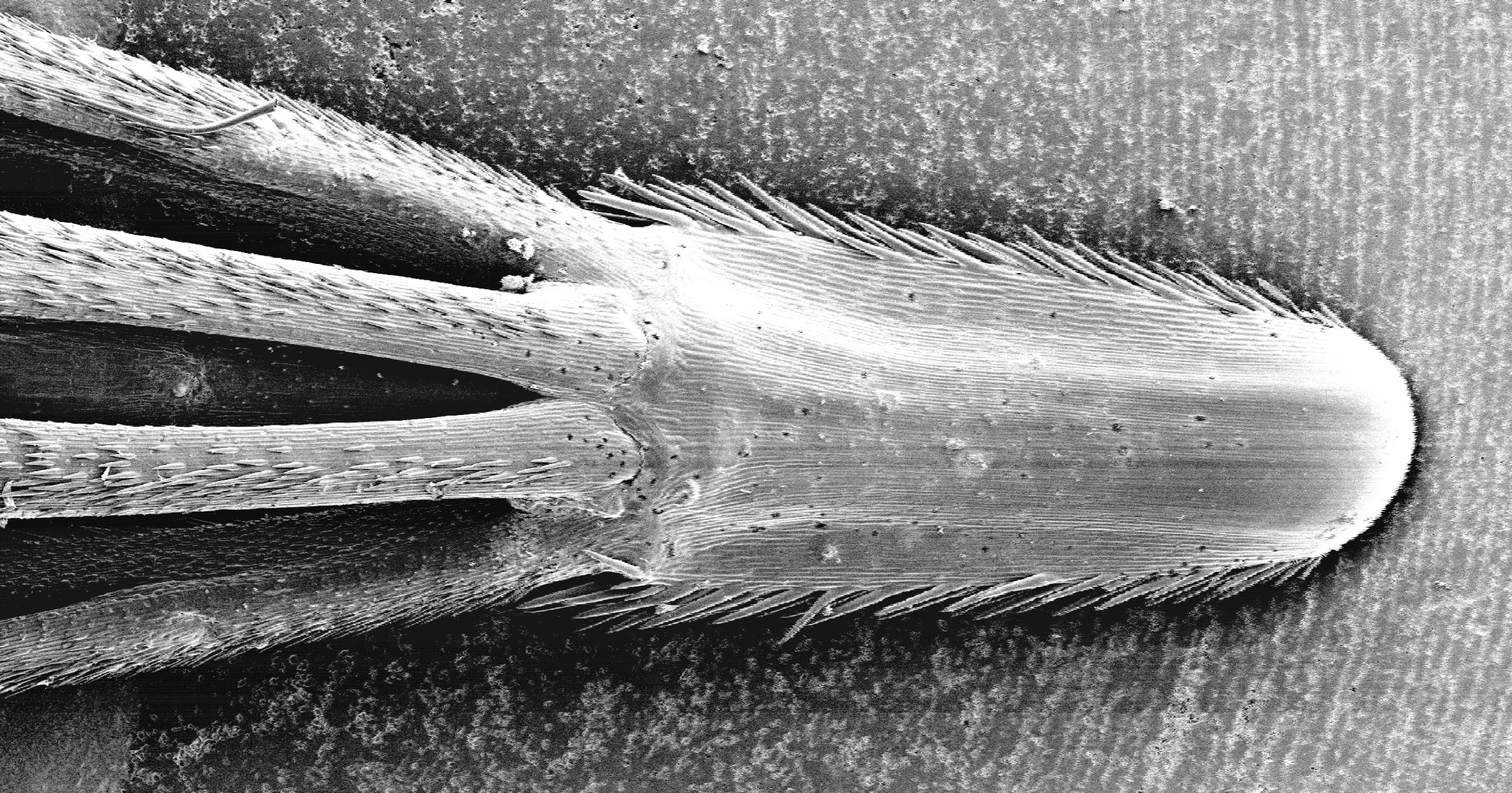
Rachis segment viewed by scanning electron microscope. Note the retrorse barbs on both the rachis and the pedicels.

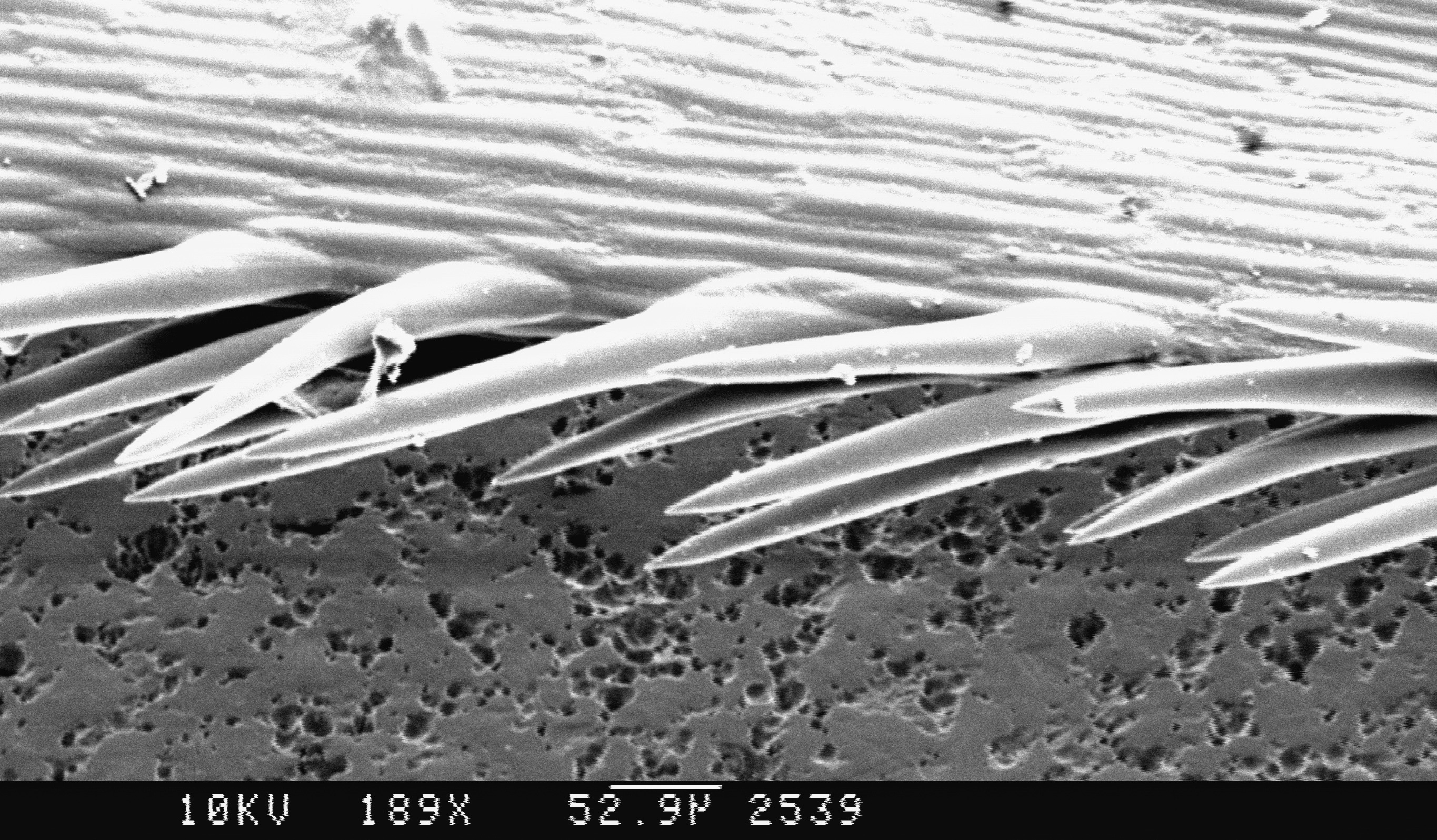
Retrorse barbs on lemma.

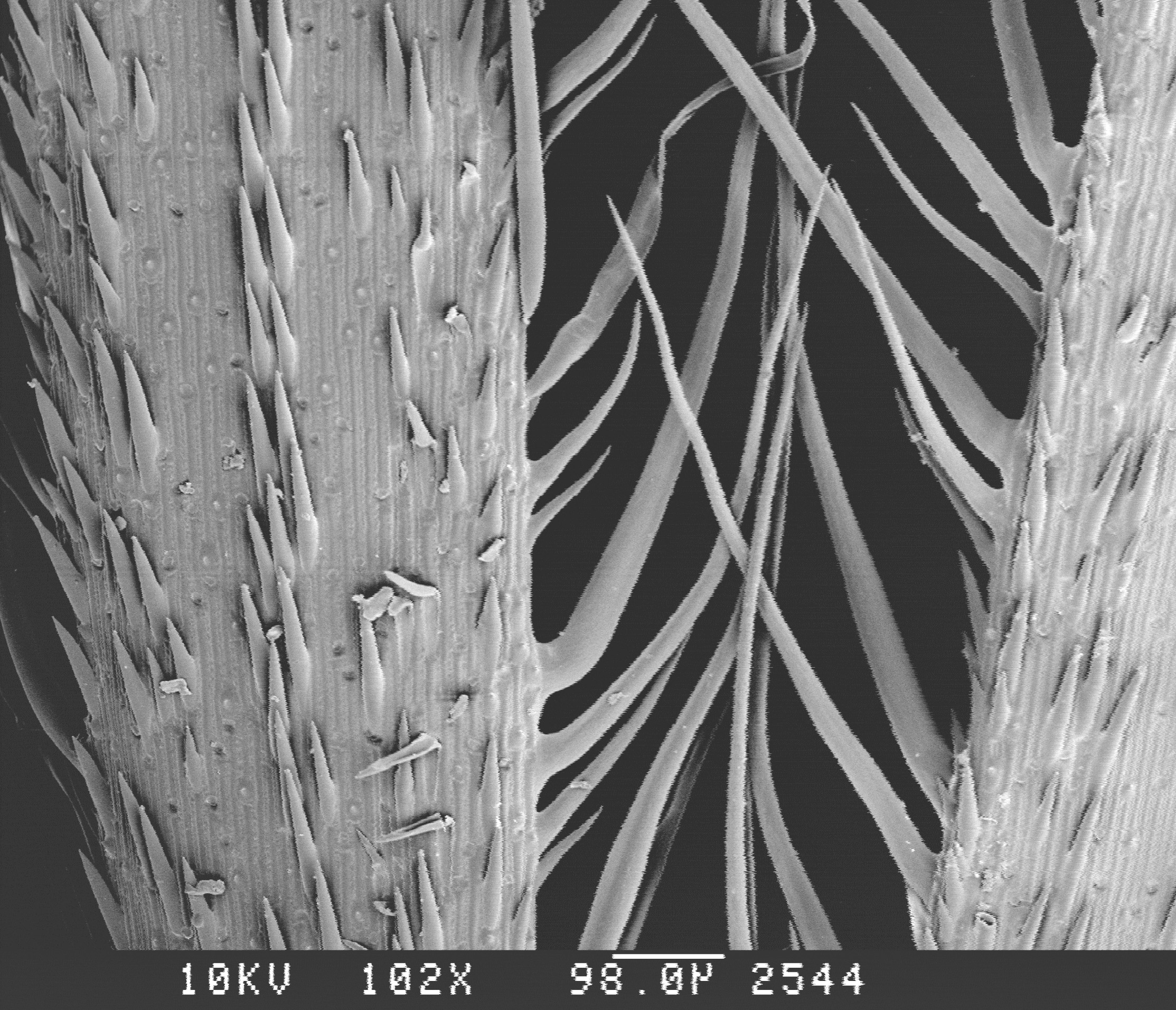
Retrorse barbs and trichomes on lemma.

== See also ==
- Diaspore (botany)
