= Phytochory =

Dispersal of animals by plants

Phytochory is animal transportation and dispersal where plants as a whole, or parts of their body play an important direct role in animal transportation and dispersal. Plants have limited mobility and play a passive role in the dispersal of animals. However, without plant involvement, the dispersal of thousands of animal species would be difficult or impossible. The most known are the cases of an animal phytochory, but it also applies to viruses and presumably microorganisms of the other groups. The phenomenon of phytochory refers to the forensic interrelations where:

- animals and plants are in direct physical contact for an extended period of time. For this reason, a bee visiting a flower of a free-floating plant should not be considered an example of phytochory;
- phoretic agents are only those plant substrata that have not undergone significant changes in composition and structure. This is why manufactured wood (such as lumber, plywood), and various products of advanced processing (e.g. flour, groats or viscose) are not substrates for phytochory either.

There is the distinction between phytochory and some other special cases of dispersal. For example, the feces of frugivorous vertebrates contain the remains of plants and, occasionally, seeds with some invertebrates inside. Thus, there is a clear overlap of three kinds of phoretic relationships: plant–vertebrates (zoochory), vertebrates–seminivorous insects (phoresy), and plаnt–seminivorous invertebrates (phytochory). (For details see below)

== Etymology ==
The term “phytochory” was introduced to designate cases of virus displacement by plants. It was derived from two Greek words: φυτόν “plant” and χωρέω “choreo” – “distribute”, “disperse”, “spread”. Later this term was taken to common biological dictionaries and its meaning was expanded to animal dispersal.

== The main types of phytochory ==
=== Biological rafting ===
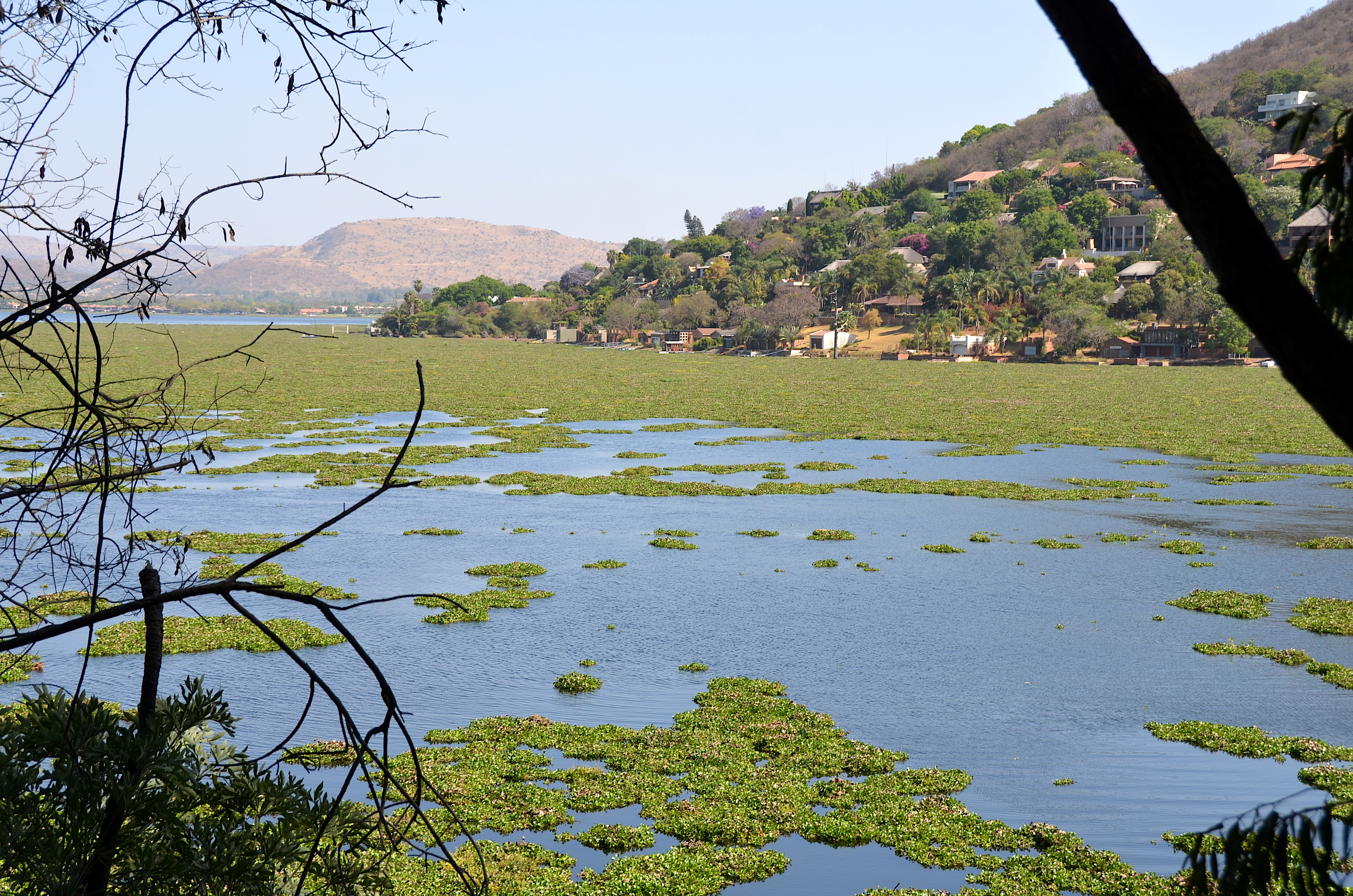
Water hyacinth in South Africa

.

Biological rafts consist of macrophytes or/and algae, driftwood, separate leaves and fruits shifted by currents and waves. Rafts become a kind of transport for numerous animals. Extensive research of drifting plant materials has found more than 1,200 animal species on the surface and inside of substrata. Good example of aquatic raft is water hyacinth. Over 150 species live on “floating islands” of this plant, including unicellular organisms, crustaceans, insects, centipedes, spiders, molluscs, flatworms, eelworms and birds. This complex includes herbivores, predators, parasites and parasitoids. It forms quite stable ecological communities on large rafts.

== Gone with the wind ==
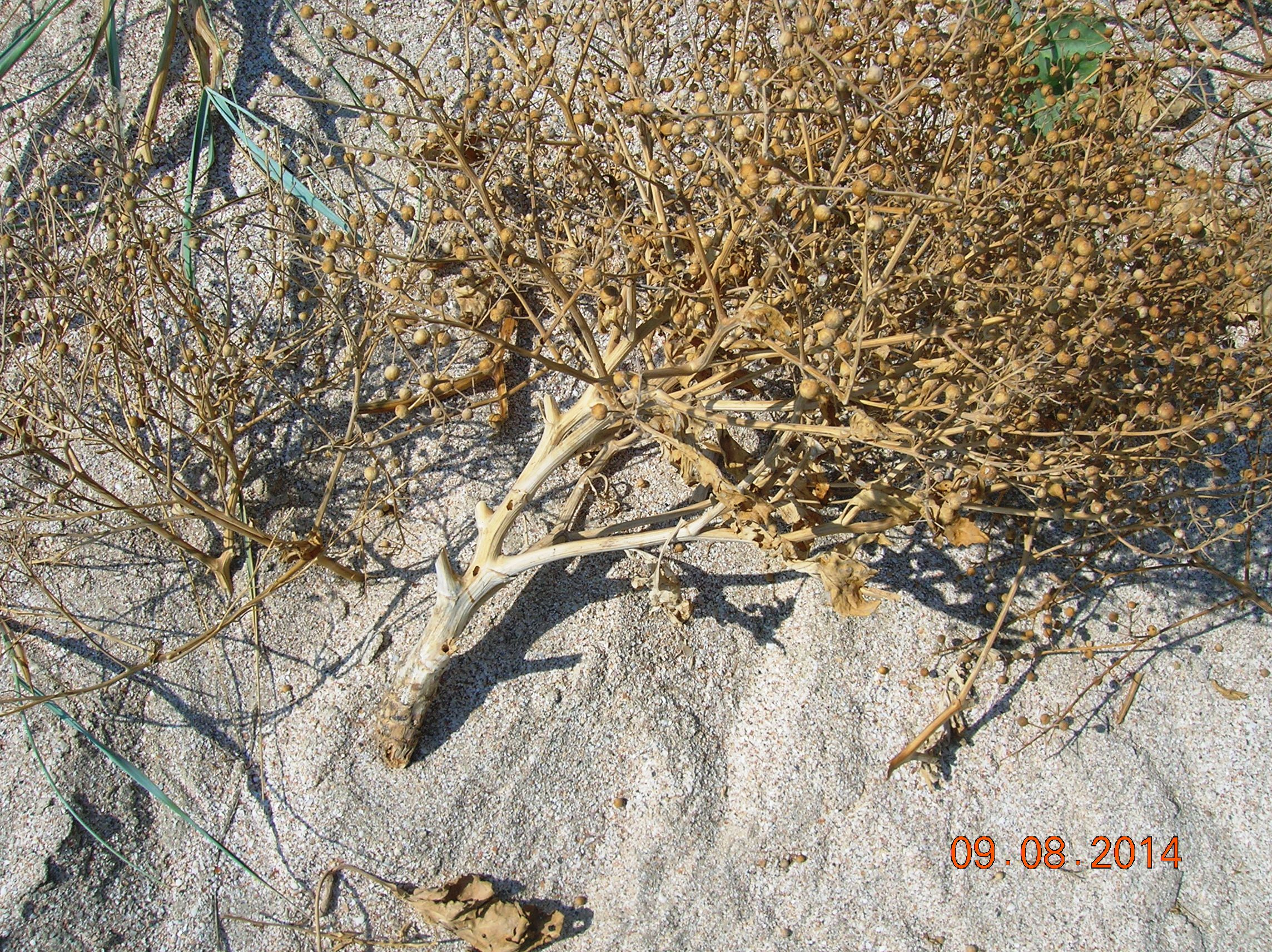
A fragment of a seakale bush gone by the wind. Weevil exit holes are seen on the lower part of the stem

.

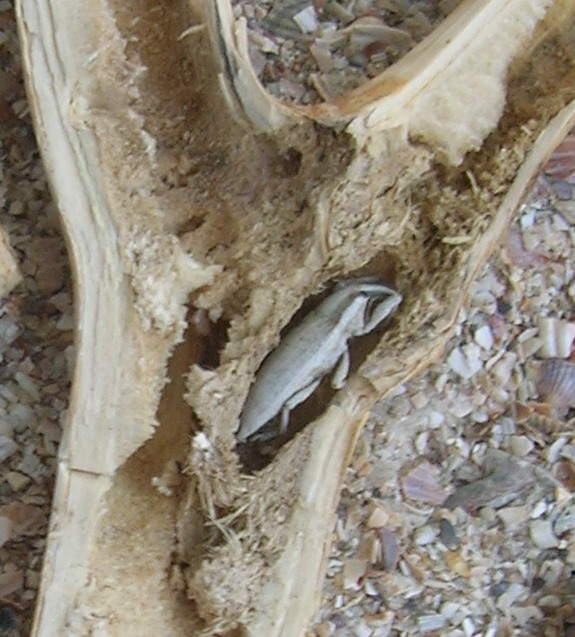
Cut stem of seakale with weevil inside

.

Air currents are an important factor in plant dispersal. Some invertebrates living inside above-ground plant organs use them for their own dispersal. For example, development of the seakale weevil Lixus canescens from egg to imago takes place inside the stem of the seakale tumbleweed. In late summer or autumn, the stem dries, then detaches from the root and rolls due to wind force. During the same season, pupae and imagoes finish their development. Adults go outside, sometimes as far as 1.5 km from their starting point. Gall midges are spread likewise inside dry fruits in deserts which protects them from the heat.

=== Vertebrates as dispersers ===
Many vertebrate species are frugivorous. They consume fruits which contain live invertebrates inside (usually in the seeds). As a result, a tri-trophic mutualistic assemblage develops. For example, larvae of some weevils feed inside the seeds of the queen palm. Ripe sweet pulp of the fruit is an attractive food for many birds and mammals: thrushes, toucans, jaws, opossums, squirrels, tapirs, and others. Vertebrate consumers of pulp regurgitate the robust pits, but usually non-digested pits are excreted during defecation. Endobionts have resistance to digestion. Larva gnaws its way out and burrows into the soil where it pupates. Therefore, vertebrates are an important vector not only for plants, but for phytochial invertebrates as well.

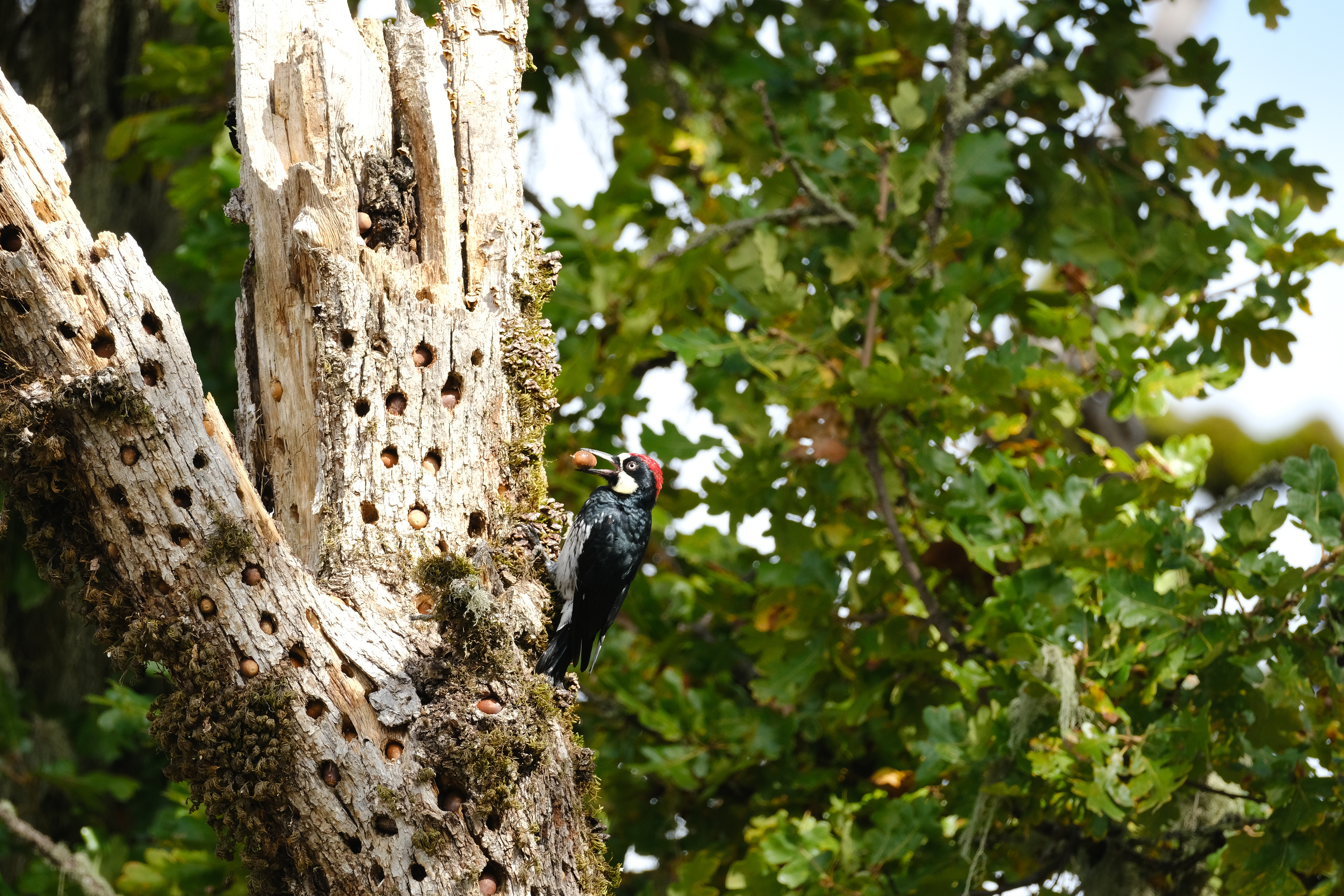
“Storage tree” of the аcorn woodpecker. This bird drills small holes in dead wood for storage of acorns. Granaries may consist of thousands of holes, each of which may be filled by acorn in autumn. Since 90% of acorns are infested with endobionts, phytochory likely takes place

Phytochorial interactions can form in other scenarios, when forensic animals:

- store fruits or seeds (as do mice, rats, squirrels, chipmunks, corvides, nutcrackers);
- interact with diaspores of authochores and zoochores (see Seed dispersal);
- build their nests or shelters using plant material.

=== Following human activities ===
Phytochory can occur when plant or plant products are displaced, intentionally or accidentally. This includes seedlings, ornamental species, fruits, vegetables and seeds, as well as logs, bark, hay, and straw. It also includes various raw materials such as medical, food-based and perfumery products. Naturally, this activities promote the dispersal of animals associated with these plants. Results can have both positive and negative consequences for the environment.

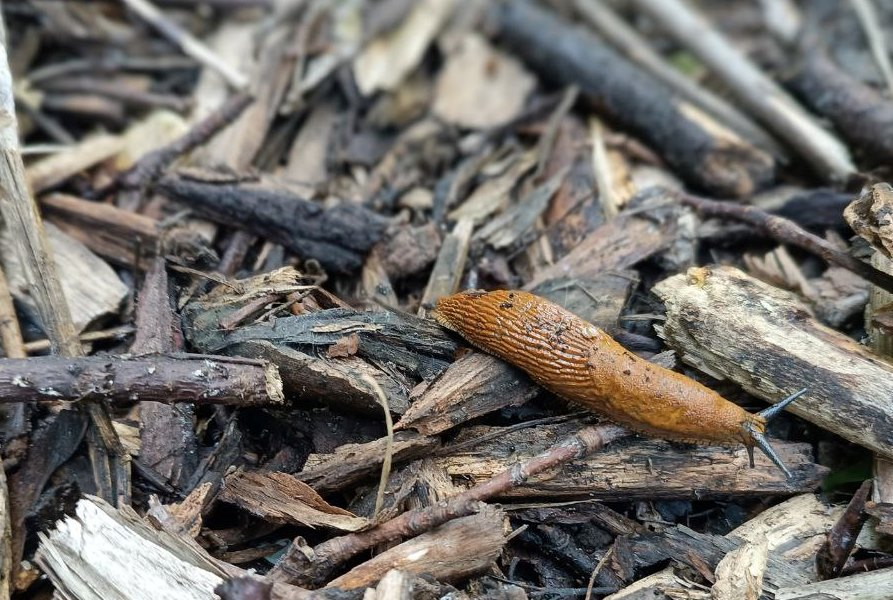
Since the 1950s, the range of the Spanish slug (′′Arion vulgaris′′) has sufficiently expanded. Its distribution has included almost the whole of Western and Central Europe, as well as various parts of the remaining Europe. The main modes of its invasion are through transportation seedlings, vegetables, soil, and plant debris. It is serious agricultural and horticultural pest.

From all available evidence, this type of phytochory has deep roots in the history of mankind. Underwater archaeologists have discovered the sunken merchant ship that sank 3,300 years ago off the coast of southern Turkey. Most of the storage space of the ship was occupied by massive copper ingots. Under the ingots, there were 22 land snail shells and remnants of spiny branches from bushes. Apparently, plant material was used to cushion the heavy cargo and prevent the wooden planks of the ship from damage. It seems likely that snails came aboard the ship together with branches. It is possible that there were earlier instances of accidental transportation of animals owing plants. Modern human technologies allow phytochores to rapidly cover long distance and drastically expand their range. For example, in 2000, numerous records of longhorn beetle Oemona hirta were registered in Great Britain. However, it was previously known as endemic of New Zealand (!). In Great Britain, the plant trade is particularly responsible for nearly 90% of human-assisted introductions of invertebrate species (in ornamental plants, apiculture, biological control, timber imports, transport stowaways and intentional releases).

== Biological significance in animal life ==
Similar to other kinds of dispersal, phytochory facilitates gene flow and thus enriches the gene pool of a population. Phytochores have additional means for extending the range of species; by using plant adaptations, animals conserve their own energy and material resources (similar to phoresy, zoochory, etc.). Wingless, slow-moving and sedentary species gain a second chance at dispersal. However, there are also potential losses. Some of these include increased mortality due to an unfamiliar new habitat and reproductive failure as well as unstable living substrate with more competition for food and space on the rafts.

== Applied aspects ==
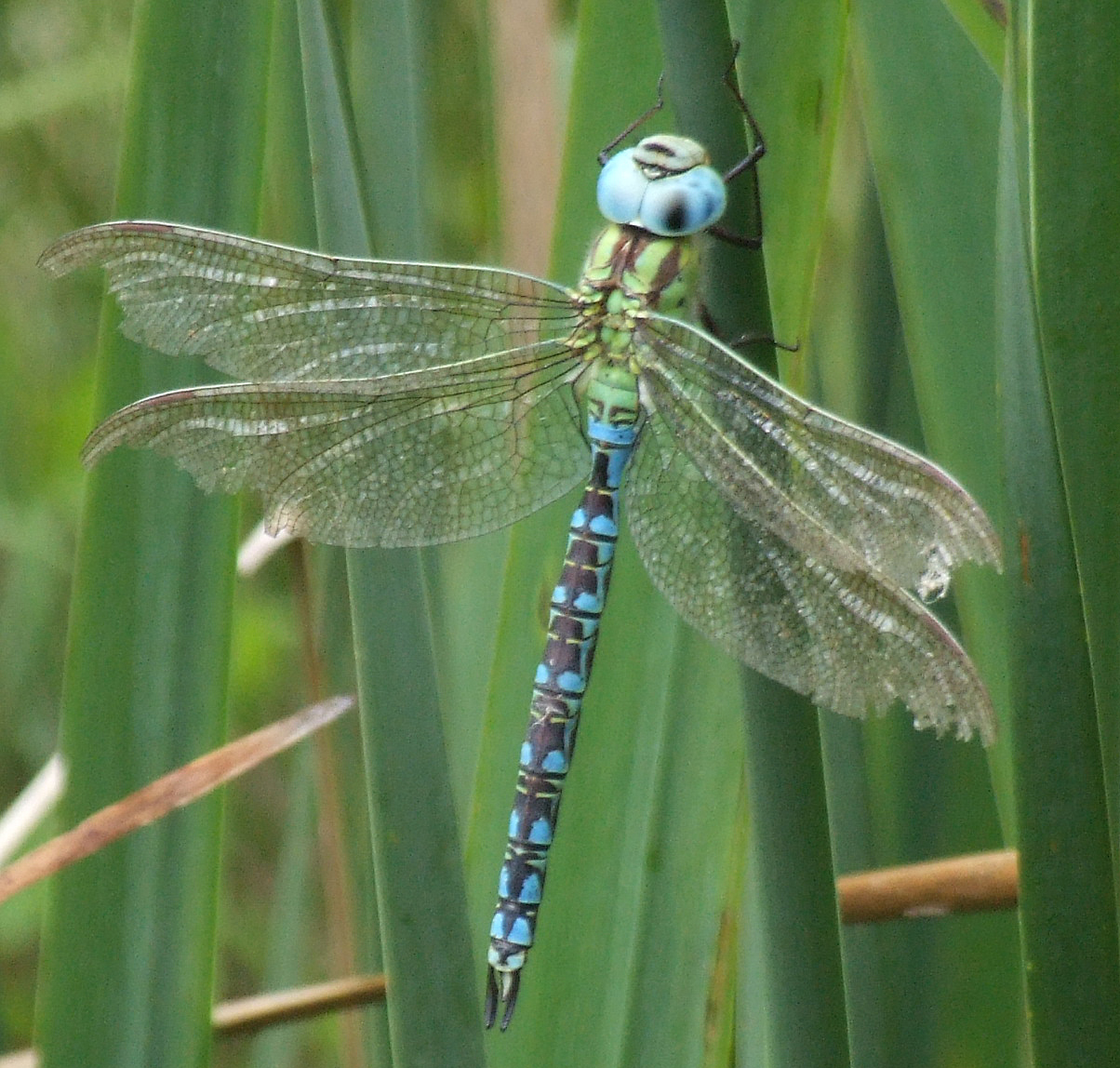
The vulnerable European dragonfly species green hawker (Aeshna viridis) lay their eggs into leaves of the water pineapple only. When these plants form free-floating clusters, dragonfly larvae can hide there. Therefore, to dragonfly protection, optimal conditions for both species must be maintained.

Advanced studies of phytochory can promote progress in at least four activity areas.

1. Conservation of biodiversity, including the establishment and functioning of sea and aquatic reserves. Besides this, some phytochores are believed to have negative impacts on the environment.

2. Biological control and pests. To predict the effects of programmes of biological pest control and farm management in general.

3. Public and veterinary health. Medicine and veterinary science need information about insects, worms, mollusks, parasitic unicellular organism linked with free-floating macrophytes, and their role in causing or carrying deceases.

4. Ecosystem management for forest, gardening and aquatic ecological restoration.
