= Tumbleweed Tree =

Christmas decoration in Chandler, Arizona, U.S.

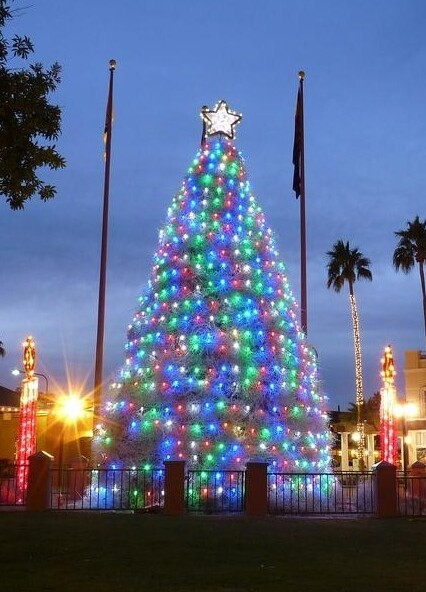
- The Tumbleweed Tree in December 2009
- Location: Chandler, Arizona, U.S.
- Inauguration date: 1957; 69 years ago

The Tumbleweed Tree is a Christmas decoration made of tumbleweeds in the shape of a Christmas tree. Each year since 1957, the city of Chandler, Arizona, assembles the decoration, using over 1,000 tumbleweeds and 1,200 lights. It has been recognized in national publications, including as the best Christmas light display in Arizona according to Travel + Leisure.

== History ==
Prior to 1957, the town of Chandler, Arizona, had decorated for Christmas with large strands of colored lights on its street lights. That year, Arizona Public Service replaced the street lights, and the new posts were not strong enough to hold the typical decorations. The town appointed a committee, which presented its findings in September 1957, particularly advocating for improved displays in the town's Chandler Park. Town decorator Earle Barnum shared the idea for a tree made of tumbleweeds, which he claimed to have based on a tree in his hometown of Elkhart, Indiana, made of pine branches. (However, an Elkhart official has since stated their city had no recorded tradition of a pine branch tree.) The first Tumbleweed Tree was completed on November 27 in the town square with help from several community service organizations and members of the local police and fire departments.

At the time, media attention focused less on the tree and more on the town's new street light decorations, featuring eighty wreaths made from cotton bolls. Only about 2–3 years later, Chandler residents grew less excited about the wreaths and more about the tree.

In 1969, a vandalism incident partially destroyed the Tumbleweed Tree. Starting the following year, the city began adding fire retardant to the tree. (That year, four attempts were made to set the tree on fire, but the new preventative measures proved effective.) Overall, the tree has burned at least seven times since its inception.

The Tumbleweed Tree has gained national recognition from a few publications. In December 2013, National Geographic mentioned it in an article and comedian Cecily Strong mentioned the tree in a Weekend Update sketch on Saturday Night Live. Lifestyle magazine Travel + Leisure has named the tree the best Christmas light display in Arizona.

== Design and construction ==
Initially, the Tumbleweed Tree was created by pushing tumbleweeds together against a telephone pole in the ground, using strings of lights to form the tree shape and hold the tumbleweeds in place.

Today, an internal frame for the tree is made by bolting a metal pole into the ground, attaching rings to the top and bottom, connecting the rings with several cables to create a tree shape, and placing a star at the top of the structure.

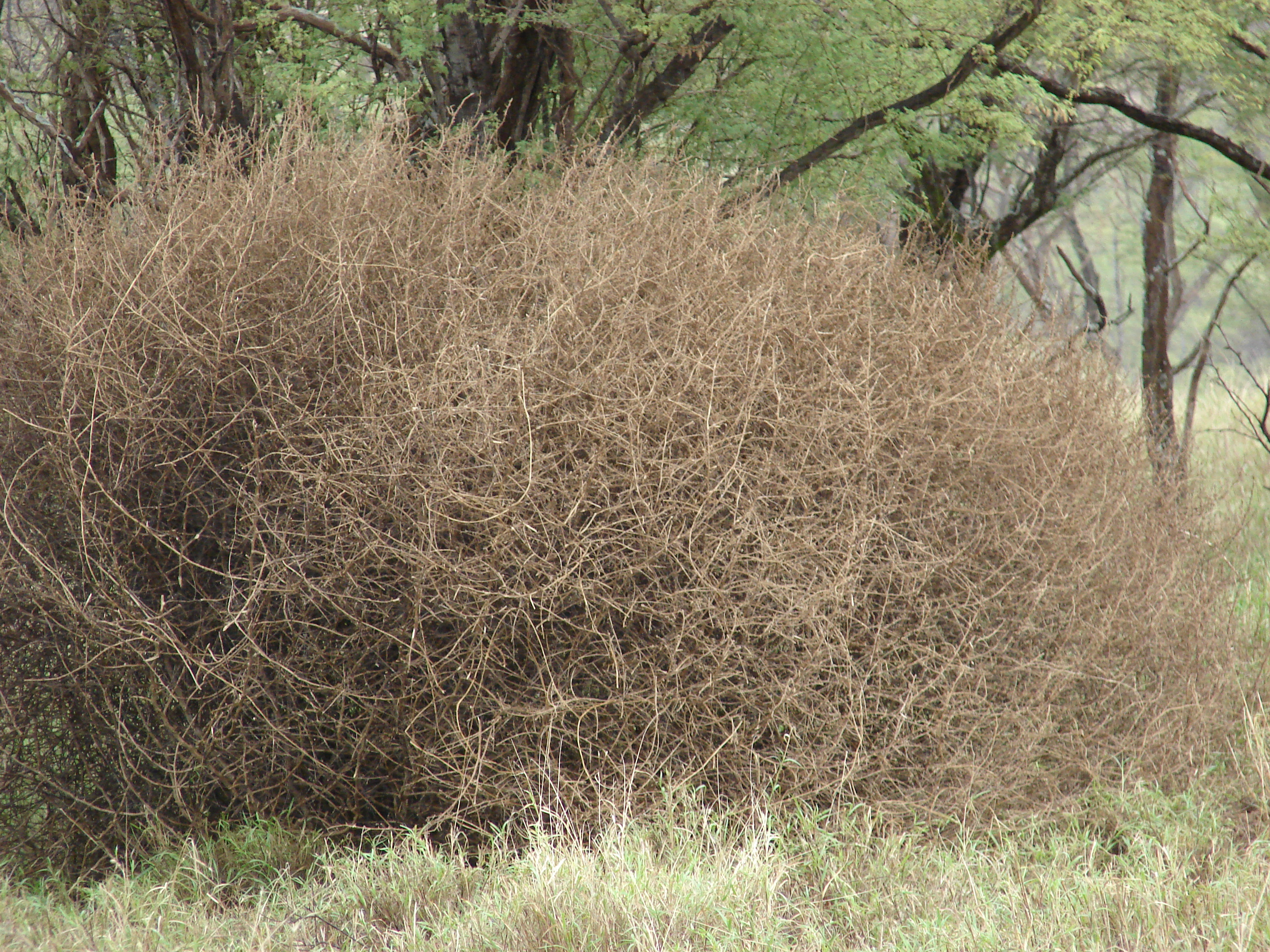
Salsola tragus, the most common plant species in the United States to produce tumbleweeds

Each year, starting around October, city employees search fields and vacant lots for over one thousand tumbleweeds, which they collect, dry, and store until it is time to create the tree. At that point, chicken wire is wrapped around the tree structure, and the tumbleweeds are tied to the wire. Once the tumbleweeds are attached, city employees spray the tree with fire retardant, paint it with about 25 US gallons (95 L; 21 imp gal) of latex paint, and coat it with about 50 pounds (23 kg) of glitter. Finally, about 1,200 lights are strung around the tree.

The design and construction of the tree have changed slightly throughout its history, but the city says it averages 33 feet (10 m) tall and 18 feet (5.5 m) wide.
