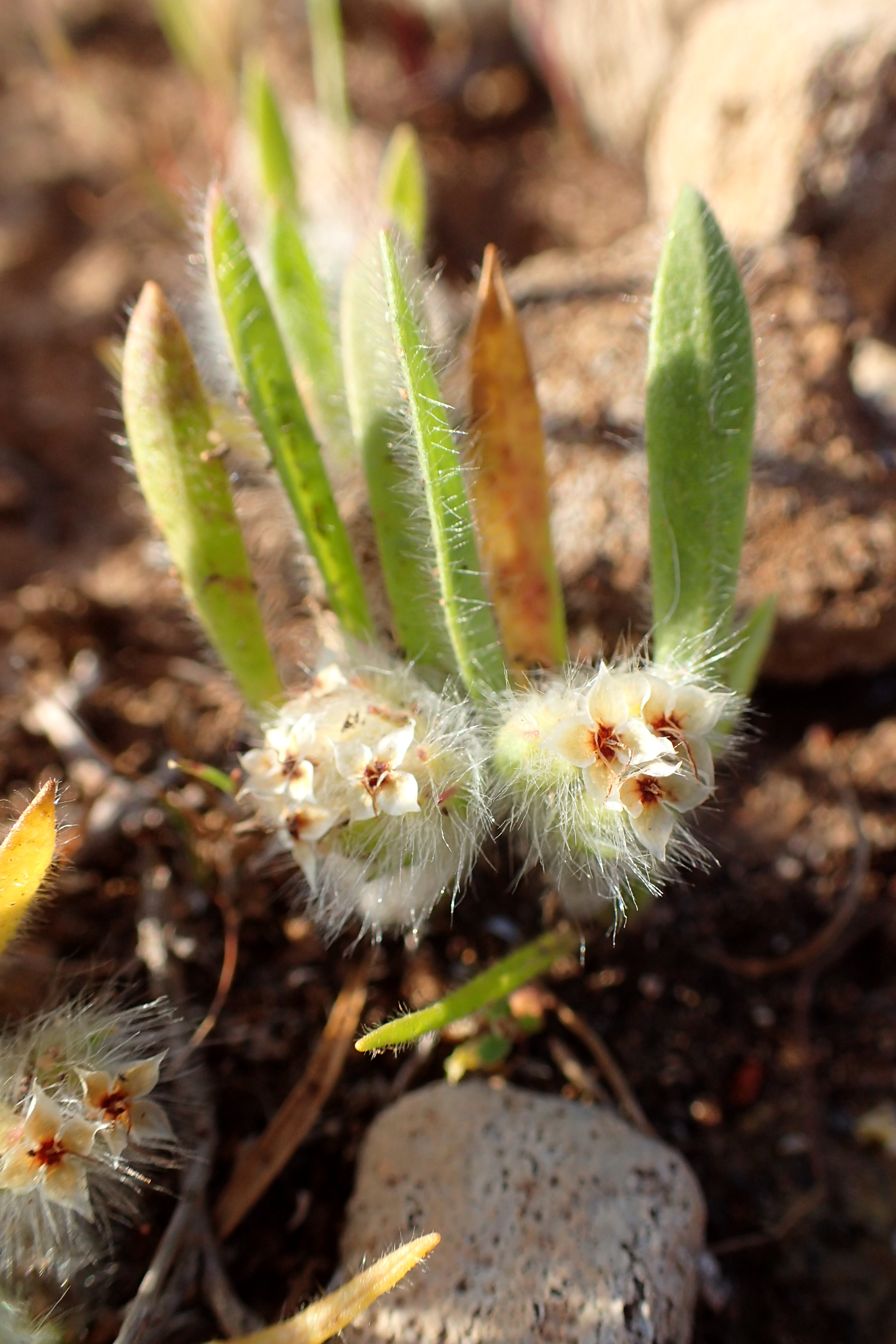

Scientific classification
- Kingdom: Plantae
- Clade: Embryophytes
- Clade: Tracheophytes
- Clade: Angiosperms
- Clade: Eudicots
- Clade: Asterids
- Order: Lamiales
- Family: Plantaginaceae
- Genus: Plantago
- Species: P. cretica

Binomial name
- Plantago cretica L.

= Plantago cretica =

Species of flowering plant in the plantain family

Plantago cretica is a species of plant in the family Plantaginaceae known by the common name Cretan plantain.

== Description and Biology ==
It is a tumbleweed, densely tufted annual plant. The leaves are in basal rosette, entire, narrow-linear and woolly, upright, to 15 cm (5.9 in). The inflorescences and short flowering stalks are densely creamy to brown-hairy, curling downwards after flowering to form a dense mass at the base of the plant. Flowering from March to May.

== Habitat ==
Dry, sandy and rocky soils.

== Distribution ==
This Mediterranean species is native to Greece (Aegean islands and Crete), Cyprus, Israel, Lebanon, Syria, Turkey. It has been introduced in Australia.
