= Foxtail =

Foxtail or fox tail may refer to:

== Plants ==
- Foxtail (diaspore), the dry spikelet or spikelet cluster of some grasses
  - Alopecurus, foxtail grasses - the scientific name literally means "fox tail"
  - Bromus madritensis, foxtail brome
  - Hordeum jubatum, foxtail barley
  - Setaria, foxtail millets
- Acalypha hispida, chenille plant or fox tail
- Asparagus densiflorus, foxtail fern
- Lycopodium clavatum, foxtail clubmoss
- Wodyetia, foxtail palm
- Agave attenuata, an agave species also known as the Foxtail

== Other uses ==
- Foxtail Peak, Antarctica
- Foxtail, a character in the animated series OK K.O.! Let's Be Heroes
- Foxtails (band)
