= Spear grass =

Spear grass or speargrass is the common name of numerous herbaceous plants worldwide including:

== Poaceae (grasses) ==
- Aciphylla spp.
- Aristida spp.
- Heteropogon contortus
- Imperata cylindrica
- Piptochaetium
- Poa spp.
- Stipa spp.; typically Stipa calamagrostis

== Apiaceae (umbellifers) ==
Aciphylla spp.

== Other ==
- Foxtail (disambiguation)
