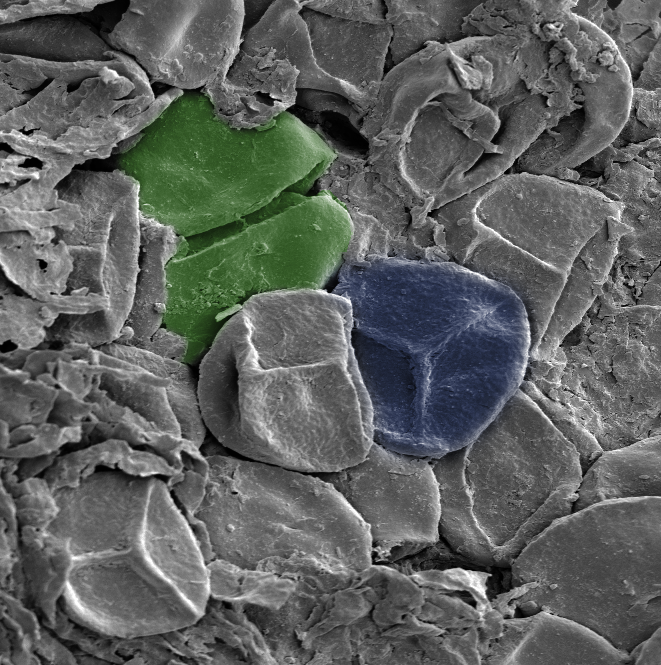

Scientific classification
- Kingdom: Plantae
- Genus: Scylaspora

= Scylaspora =

Scylaspora Temporal range: Wenlock–Lower Devonian

Extinct genus of plants

Scylaspora is a genus of Silu-Devonian spore, which has been found attached to stick-like sporangia. The spores are common and widespread in sediments of this age.
