= Dinosaur plant =

A dinosaur plant is a common name for several plants and may refer to:

- Anastatica, native to deserts of North Africa
- Pallenis hierochuntica, a sunflower in a genus native to the Mediterranean
- Selaginella lepidophylla, native to North America

== See also ==
- Rose of Jericho (disambiguation)
- Resurrection plant
