= Rose of Jericho =

Rose of Jericho or Jericho rose may refer to several resurrection plants:

== Plant common names ==
- Anastatica, a monotypic genus with the type species Anastatica hierochuntica or true rose of Jericho; not a true resurrection plant
- Selaginella lepidophylla, a species of desert plant in the spikemoss family (Selaginellaceae); resurrection plant
- Pallenis hierochuntica, a species of Pallenis; resurrection plant

== Songs ==
- Rose of Jericho, 2022 song by Eddie Vedder from his album Earthling
- Rose of Jericho, 1991 song by Eleventh Dream Day
- The Rose of Jericho, 2008 song by trance music DJ BT

== Other uses ==
- Rose of Jericho, a short story collection by Ivan Bunin
- Rose of Jericho, dam of the racehorse Dr Devious
- Vered Yeriho (Hebrew for Rose of Jericho), an Israeli West Bank settlement

== See also ==
- Rose of Sharon, a different plant with biblical name
