= Small hydrophilic plant seed proteins =

LEA_5 (small hydrophilic plant seed proteins)

Identifiers
- Symbol: LEA_5
- Pfam: PF00477
- InterPro: IPR000389
- PROSITE: PDOC00355
Available protein structures:
- PDB: IPR000389 PF00477 (ECOD; PDBsum)
- AlphaFold: IPR000389; PF00477

Plant seed proteins are small hydrophilic proteins. They represent a subset of late embryogenesis abundant proteins, of Dure subfamily D-19 or Bray group 1. These proteins contain from 73 to 153 amino acid residues and may play a role in equipping the seed for survival, maintaining a minimal level of hydration in the dry organism and preventing the denaturation of cytoplasmic components. They may also play a role during imbibition by controlling water uptake.
