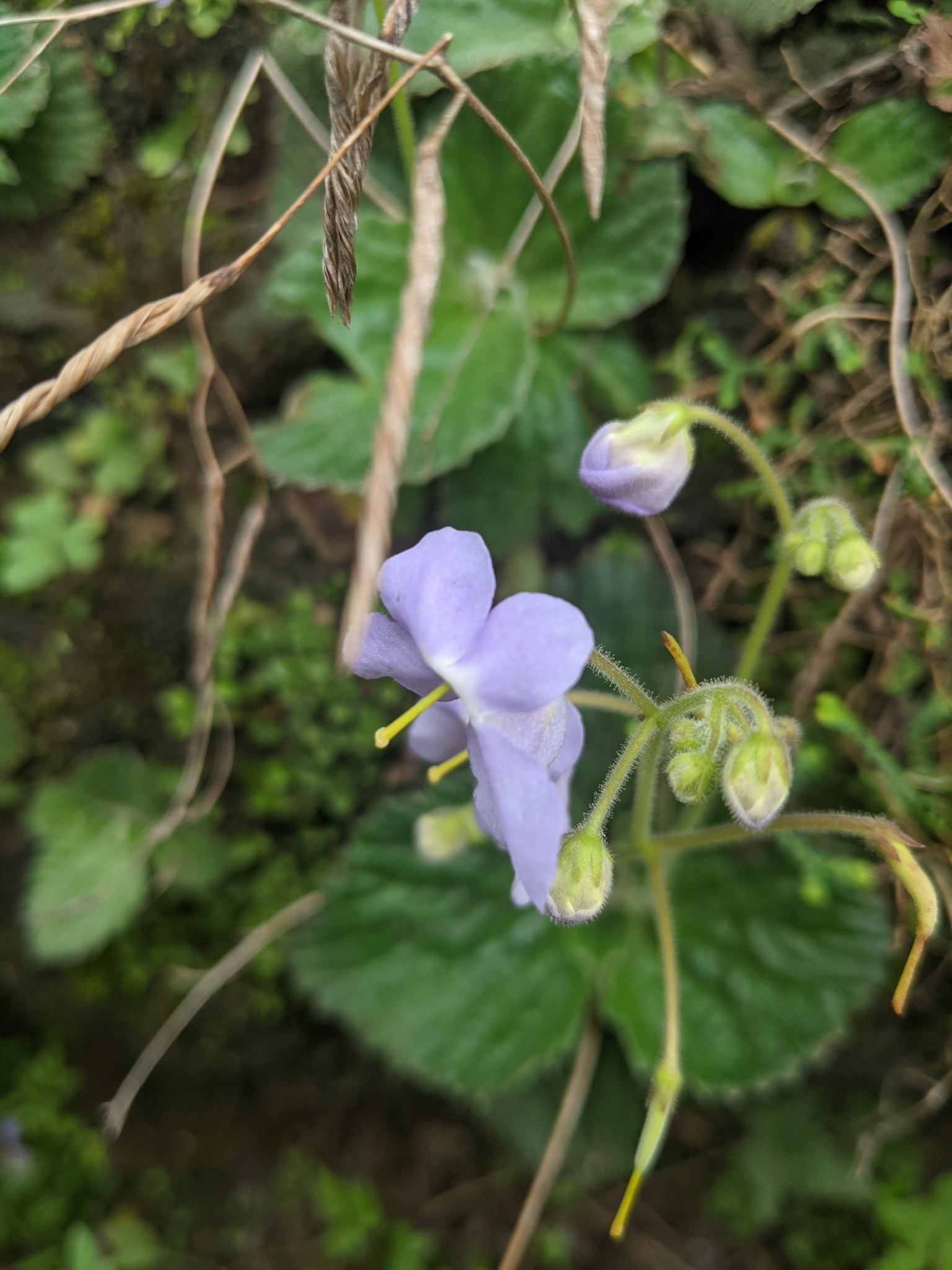
- Dorcoceras hygrometrica

Scientific classification
- Kingdom: Plantae
- Clade: Embryophytes
- Clade: Tracheophytes
- Clade: Spermatophytes
- Clade: Angiosperms
- Clade: Eudicots
- Clade: Asterids
- Order: Lamiales
- Family: Gesneriaceae
- Subfamily: Didymocarpoideae
- Genus: Dorcoceras; Bunge

Species
- See text

= Dorcoceras =

Genus of flowering plants

Dorcoceras is a genus of flowering plants in the African violet family Gesneriaceae, native to Assam, Southeast Asia, China and central Malesia. Its species were transferred from the genus Boea in 2016.

D. hygrometrica is considered a resurrection plant and its genome has been sequenced to study desiccation tolerance.

== Species ==
Currently accepted species include:

- Dorcoceras brunneum C.Puglisi
- Dorcoceras geoffrayi (Pellegr.) C.Puglisi
- Dorcoceras glabrum C.Puglisi
- Dorcoceras hygrometrica Bunge
- Dorcoceras philippense (C.B.Clarke) Schltr.
- Dorcoceras uthongense Prajanban, Patumch. & Panvilai
- Dorcoceras wallichii (R.Br.) C.Puglisi
