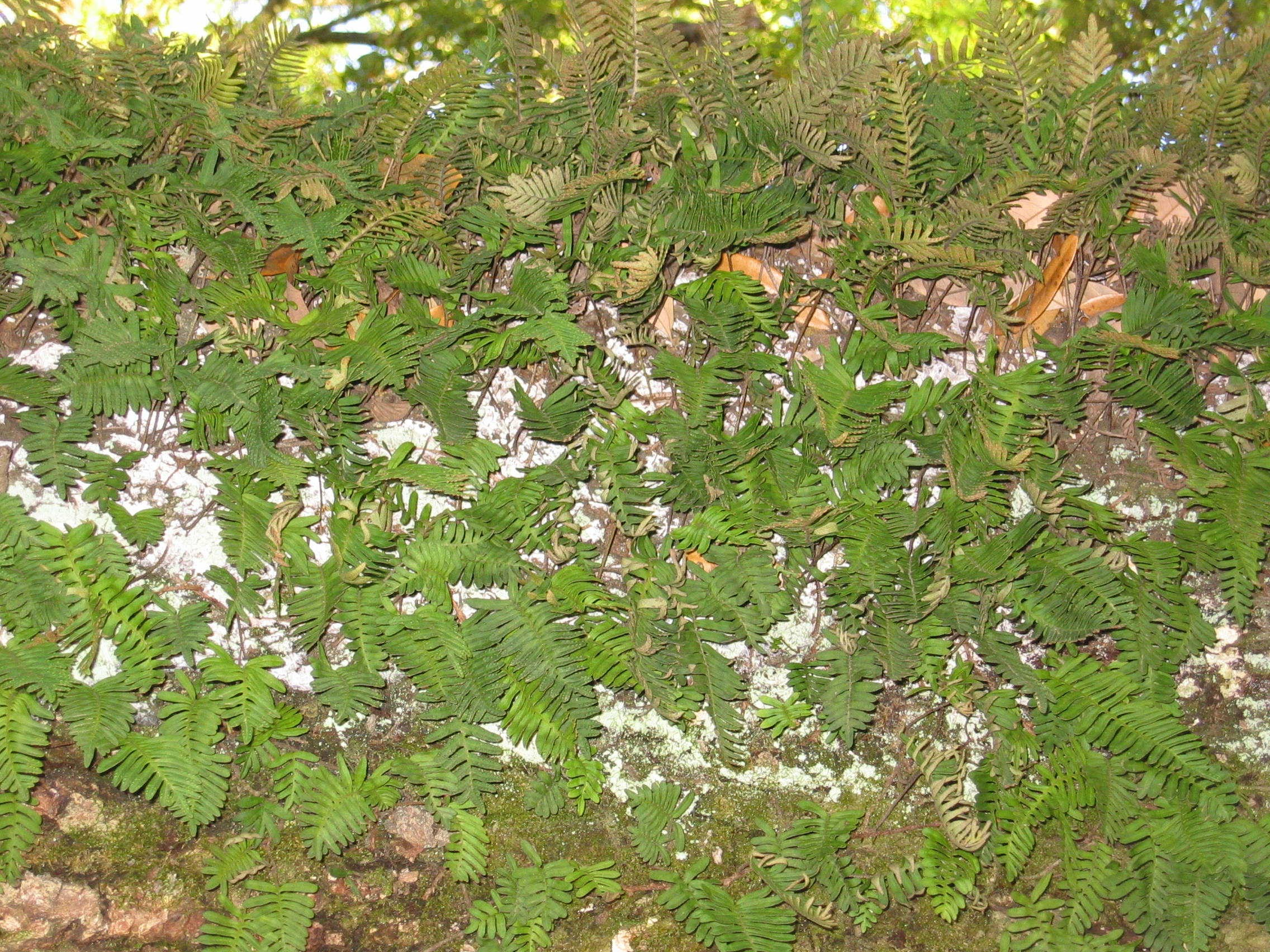
- Pleopeltis polypodioides on an oak limb after a brief rain
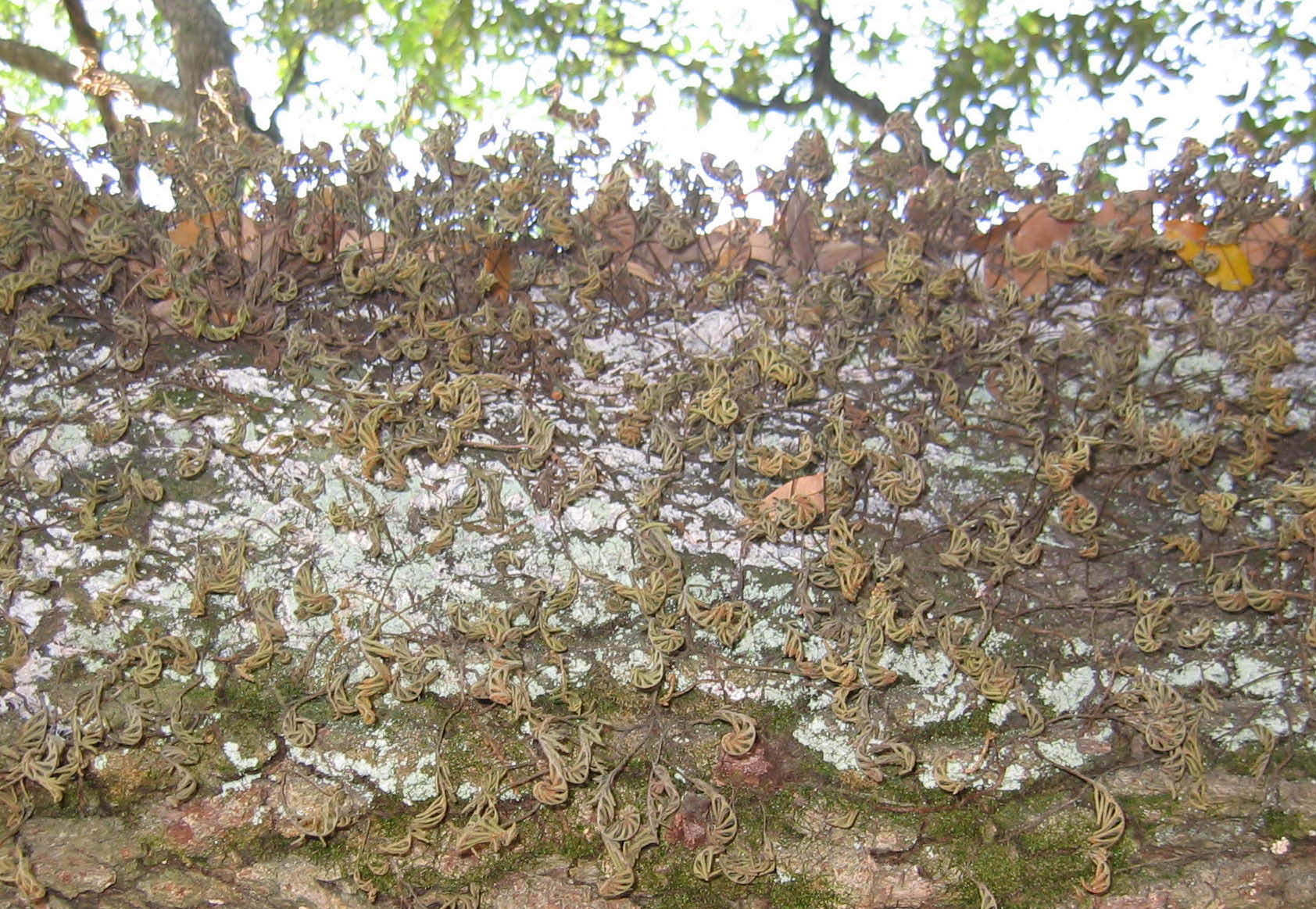
- Fronds on the same limb in desiccated state

Conservation status
- Secure (NatureServe)

Scientific classification
- Kingdom: Plantae
- Clade: Tracheophytes
- Division: Polypodiophyta
- Class: Polypodiopsida
- Order: Polypodiales
- Suborder: Polypodiineae
- Family: Polypodiaceae
- Genus: Pleopeltis
- Species: P. polypodioides

Binomial name
- Pleopeltis polypodioides (L.) E.G.Andrews & Windham

Varieties
- Pleopeltis polypodioides var. knoblochiana (Mickel) A.R.Sm. & Tejero

Synonyms
- Species: Acrostichum ferrugineum L.; Acrostichum ferruginosum L.; Acrostichum polypodioides L.; Candollea polypodioides (L.) Mirb.; Goniophlebium ceteraccinum (Michx.) Fée; Goniophlebium incanum (Sw.) J.Sm.; Lepicystis incana (Sw.) J.Sm.; Marginaria ceteraccina (Michx.) Bory; Marginaria incana (Sw.) C.Presl; Marginaria polypodioides (L.) Tidestr.; Pleopeltis incana (Sw.) Wall.; Pleopeltis polypodioides (L.) Watt.; Polypodium albidum C.Presl; Polypodium ceteraccinum Michx.; Polypodium chrysoconion Spreng.; Polypodium incanoides Fée; Polypodium incanum Sw.; Polypodium incanum var. oblongum E.Fourn.; Polypodium mesetae Christ; Polypodium polypodioides (L.) Hitchc.; Polypodium velatum Schkuhr; P. p. var. knoblochiana: Polypodium polypodioides var. knoblochianum Mickel

= Pleopeltis polypodioides =

Species of fern

Pleopeltis polypodioides, common name resurrection fern, is a species of creeping, coarse-textured fern native to the Americas and Africa.

== Description ==
The evergreen fronds of Pleopeltis polypodioides are 25 cm high by 5 cm wide and monomorphic. The leathery, yellow-green pinnae (leaflets) are deeply pinnatifid, oblong to narrowly lanceolate, usually widest near middle, occasionally at or near base. It attaches to the limbs of its host plant with a branching, creeping, slender rhizome, which grows to 2 mm in diameter. The scales are lanceolate, with light brown base and margins, and having a dark central stripe.

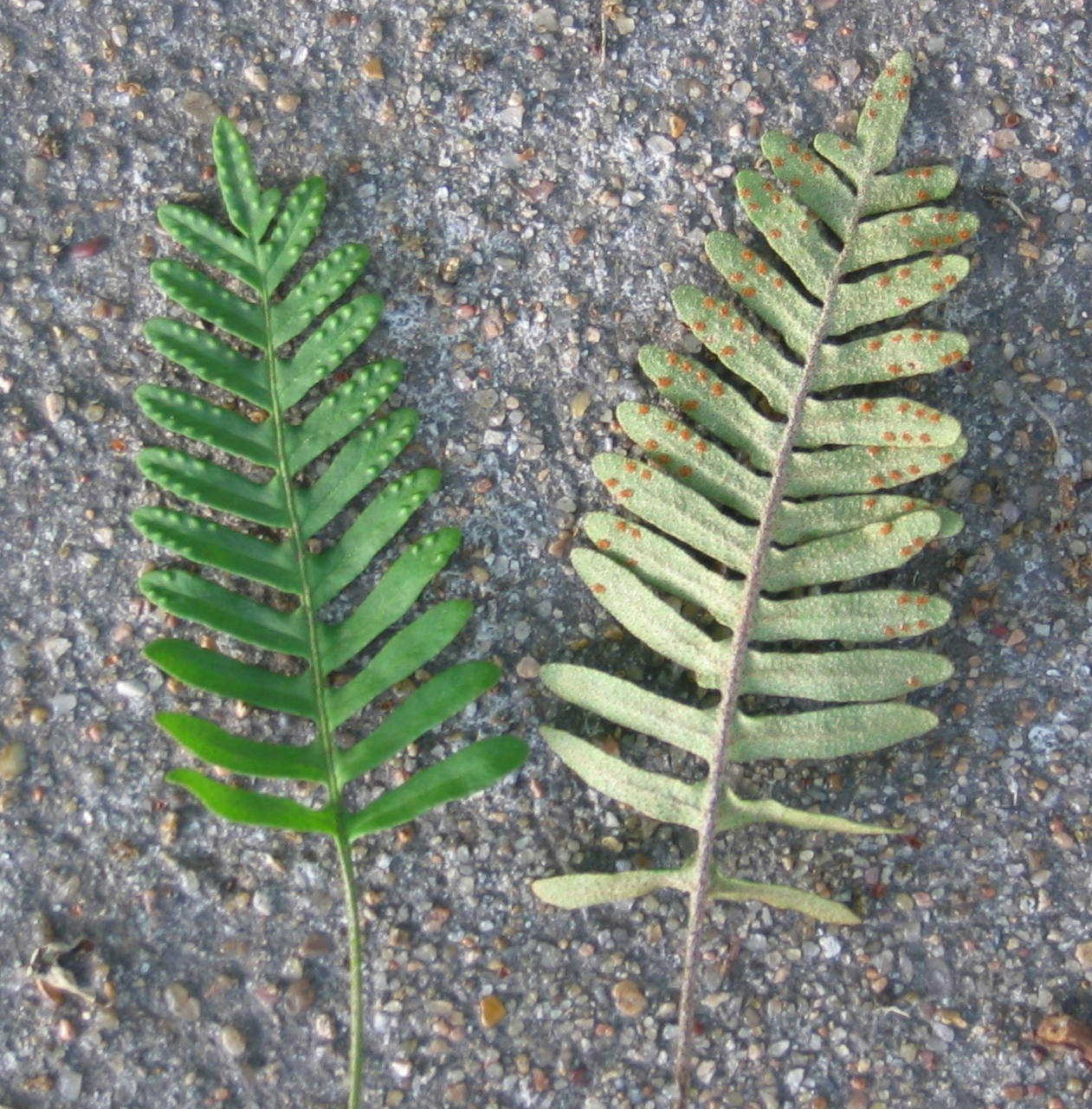
Upper and lower sides of fronds

The gametophytes (the haploid gamete producers) develop from very small spores that float in the air and are deposited on moist tree branches. These spores are produced in sporangia that develop on the leaves of the fern's sporophyte. The fern can also reproduce by the division of its rhizomes.

On the underside of the blades, the sori (reproductive clusters) are round, discrete, and sunken. Their outline can be seen as raised dimples on the upper surface. They are typically near the outer edge, and occur on all but the lowest pinnae of fertile fronds. Indusia are absent. Sporangia are yellow to brown at maturity. Spores are produced from summer to fall.

== Distribution and habitat ==
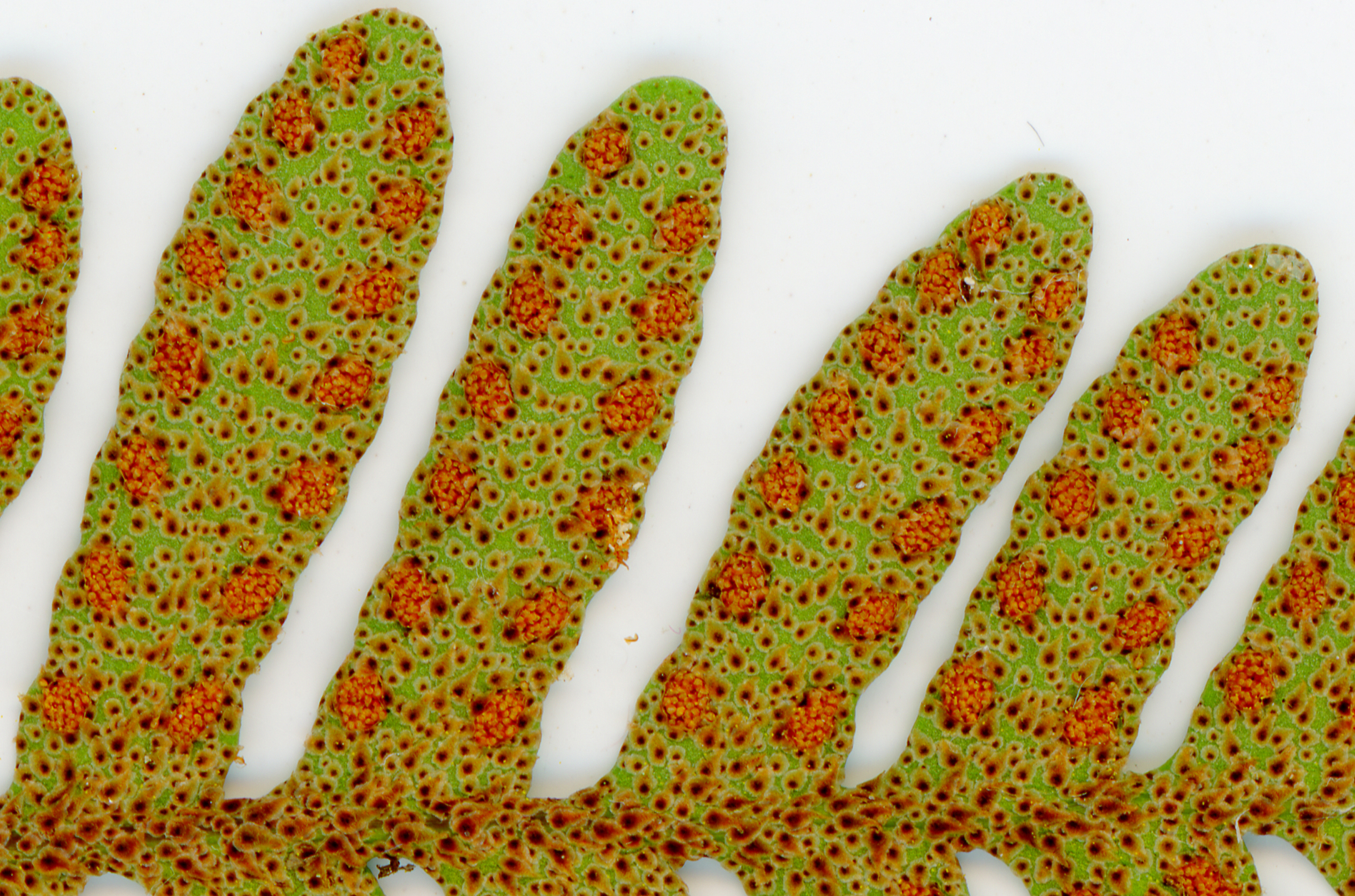
Sori on the underside of the leaf

Pleopeltis polypodioides resides in the hardwood forests of southeastern United States in areas including Delaware, Maryland, the Carolinas, Virginia, West Virginia, Illinois, Ohio, Alabama, Georgia, Florida, Mississippi, Arkansas, Texas and Oklahoma. Four clades exist: African, South America-Caribbean basin, Central America-Mexico, and North America.

Out of these 4 clades there are 6 major varieties, native to southeastern United States, Mexico, and even Africa.

- var. michauxiana
- var. knoblochianum
- var. acicularis
- var. polypodioides
- var. burchellii
- var. minus

This fern is an epiphyte, or air plant, which means it attaches itself to other plants and gets its nutrients from the air and from water and nutrients that collect on the outer surface of bark. The resurrection fern lives on the branches of large trees such as cypresses and can often be seen carpeting the shady areas on limbs of large oak trees repeatedly exposed to rainfall. However, it is known to grow on the surfaces of rocks and dead logs as well. It is often found in the company of other epiphytic plants, such as Spanish moss.

== Physiology and rehydration ==
Pleopeltis polypodioides gets its common name "resurrection fern" because it can survive long periods of drought by curling up its fronds and appearing desiccated, grey-brown and dead. However, when just a little water is present, the fern will uncurl and reopen, appearing to "resurrect". It has been estimated that these plants could last 100 years without water and still revive after a single exposure.

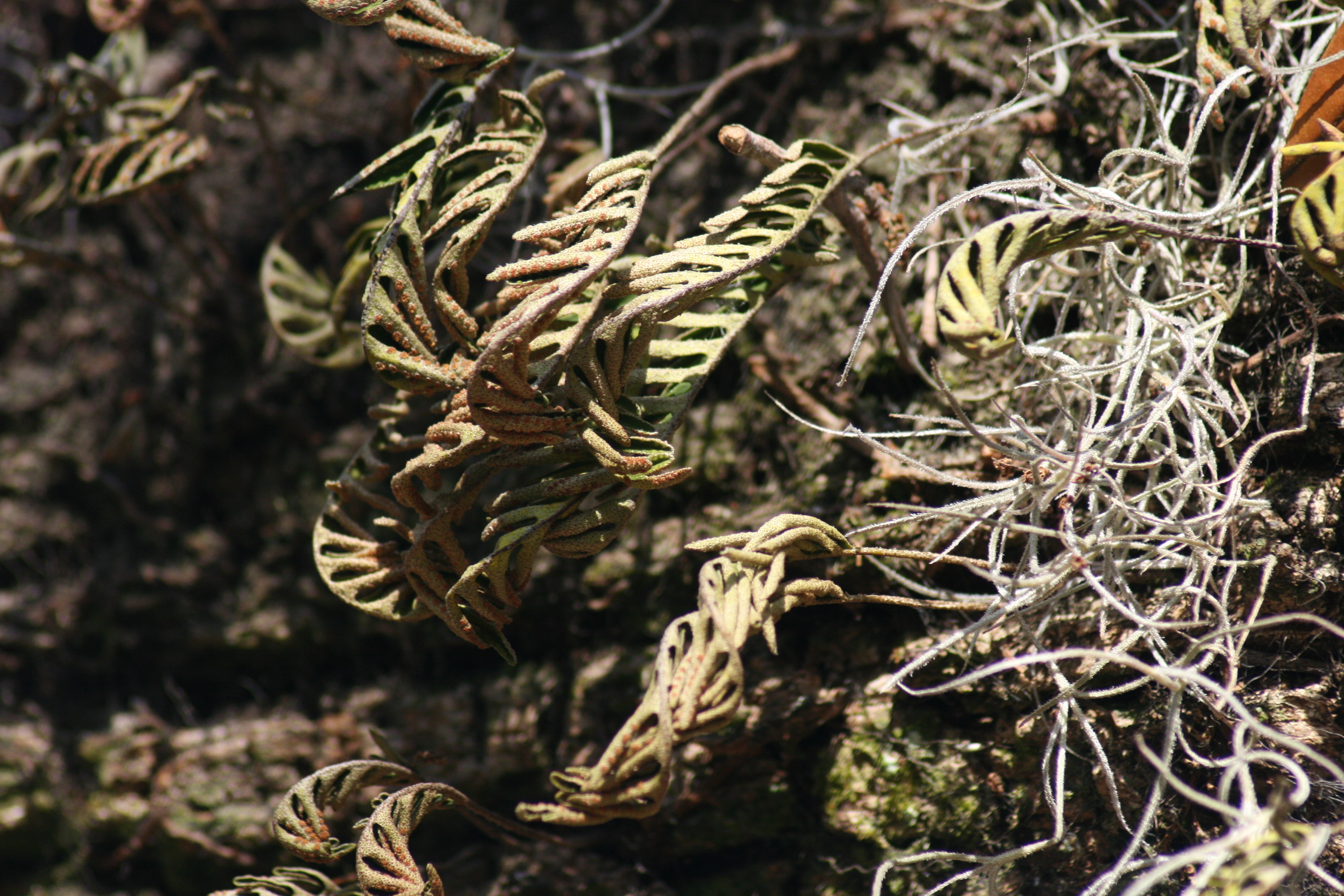
Pleopeltis polypodioides or resurrection ferns in their desiccated, curled state.

The roots have evolved to function as anchors to tree bark. They have been found to be inefficient in absorption. When in clustered groups of ferns on the bark of trees, the increased transpiration of the ferns and bark allows the middle ferns of the cluster to remain open longer than ferns on the outside. The relative humidity of the air and the closing rate of the leaves of the ferns is an inverse relationship. The greater the humidity, the slower the leaves close because of prolonged exposure to moisture in the air.

Pleopeltis polypodioides can severely desiccate and lose almost all of its water. Experiments have shown it can lose up to 97% and remain alive, though more typically, it loses around 76% in dry spells. For comparison, most other plants would die after losing only 8–12% water. Upon rainfall or even minute exposures to water, they can fully rehydrate and return to a normal state in 24 to 48 hours. Following substantial exposures to moisture, there is an immediate increase in its water content of up to 50% after the first hour and 65–70% after three hours. When it regains moisture, the fern can once again become photosynthetically active, increasing its metabolism and release of organic compounds that provide nutrients for symbiotic bacteria that allow them both to thrive.

At least one study has shown association between P. polypodioides and moss, indicating that this fern may rely on moss for some of its water needs.

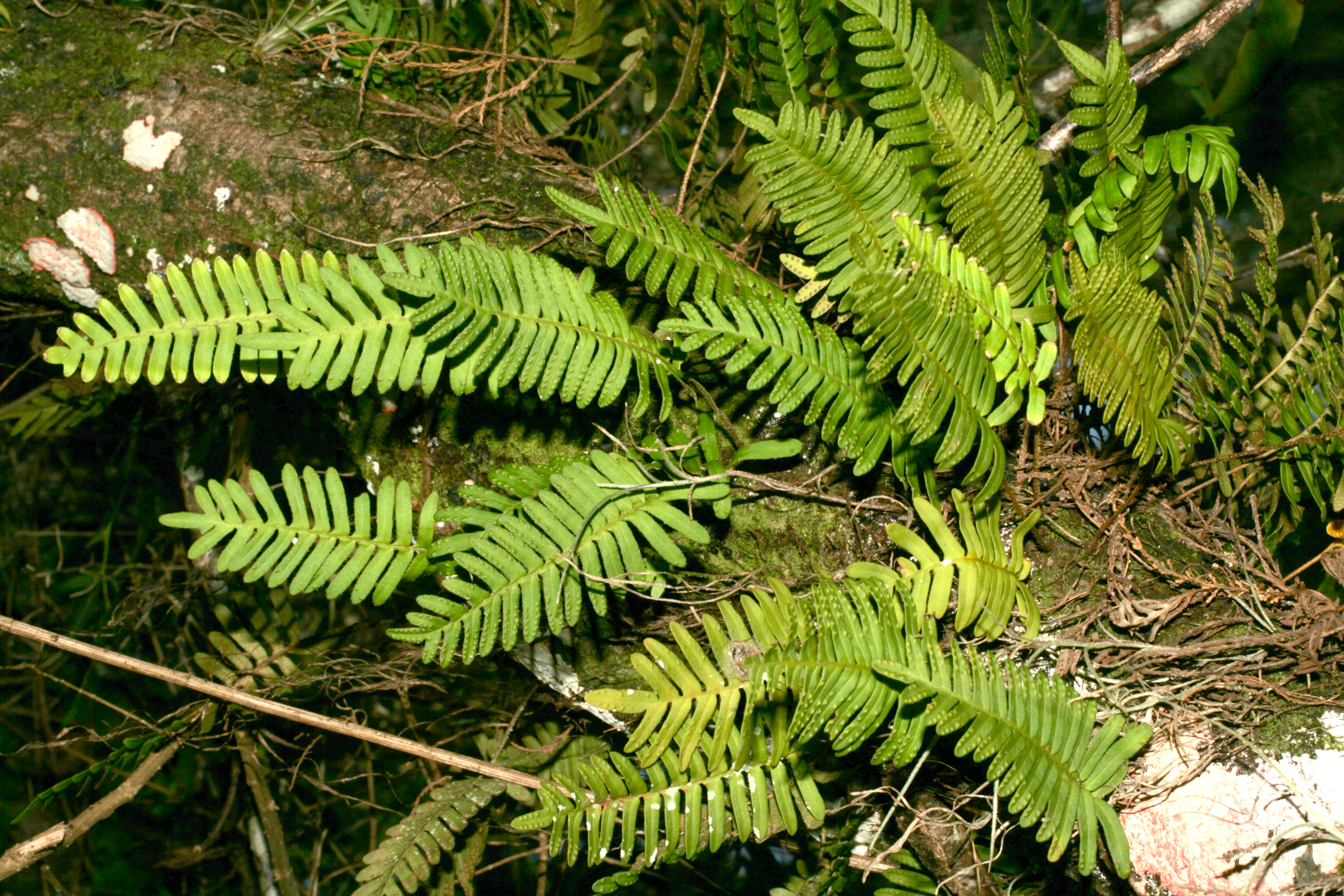
Resurrection ferns rehydrated in their uncurled state.

Resurrection ferns accumulate sugar in dehydrated cells in order to protect them and stabilize the membranes and proteins in the dry state. By accumulating sugar, the cells can maintain hydrogen bonds between necessary macromolecules needed for their structure. An interesting feature of the resurrection fern is it does not immediately take up water after having been in a desiccated state. Pleopeltis polypodioides has a porous cell structure network that can expand and rearrange to accommodate absorbing three to four times its weight in water after being exposed.

Timelapse of a resurrection fern (Pleopeltis polypodioides) absorbing a drop of water.

When the fronds "dry", the mesophyll deforms, which causes the lamina to curl and exposes the underside and show the peltate scales. The peltate scales help prevent photooxidation and mechanical damage, as well as assist in quick rehydration. The fern fronds contain canal cells in the center of their surface scales that direct water to the epidermis of the fern leaves, allowing absorption. The ability of the fern fronds to unroll after exposure to desiccation is attributed to the large cells of the upper epidermis along the midrib of the frond that increase in width more than any other epidermal cell, which forces the fronds to uncurl and flatten out.

Pleopeltis polypodioides has adapted to survive desiccation with the ability of its cell walls to deform and reform, without bursting or rupturing. It has been observed that dehydrins may allow the cell walls of the fern fronds and leaves to deform and reform in times of extreme drought followed by water exposure, due to large fluctuations in water content. Dehydrins were found to be expressed only when the fern was drying or in the desiccated state, with the dehydrins located on the outsides of the cells near the cell walls, allowing the leaves and fronds of the ferns to deform and reform accordingly.

Thermoluminescence of the resurrection fern has been tested to observe at what temperatures it occurs and therefore shows what temperatures and amount of desiccation the ferns can tolerate before their chloroplasts lose the energy they have stored for the plant in the form of light emissions. One study found the resurrection fern required high temperatures before thermoluminescence occurred at around 50 °C, whereas other desiccation-tolerant plants showed thermoluminescence at 40 °C. The thermoluminescent activity of the resurrection fern increased as it was exposed to six separate but consecutive flashes of green safelight at its leaves. Because thermoluminescence from the fern fronds was not observed until higher temperatures, this hints that the fern's chloroplasts may have a mechanism to withhold and store energy for the fern as it desiccates, allowing it to survive higher temperatures and extreme periods of desiccation.

== Reproduction ==
The fern has spores on the bottom of the fronds, contained in sori. Sori can be found aligned in rows on the underside of fertile fronds. They start as yellow, but as they mature, they turn brown and split. The fern sporulates in summer and early fall. Rhizome sections are also viable offspring and can root themselves in new medium.

== See also ==
- Resurrection plant
