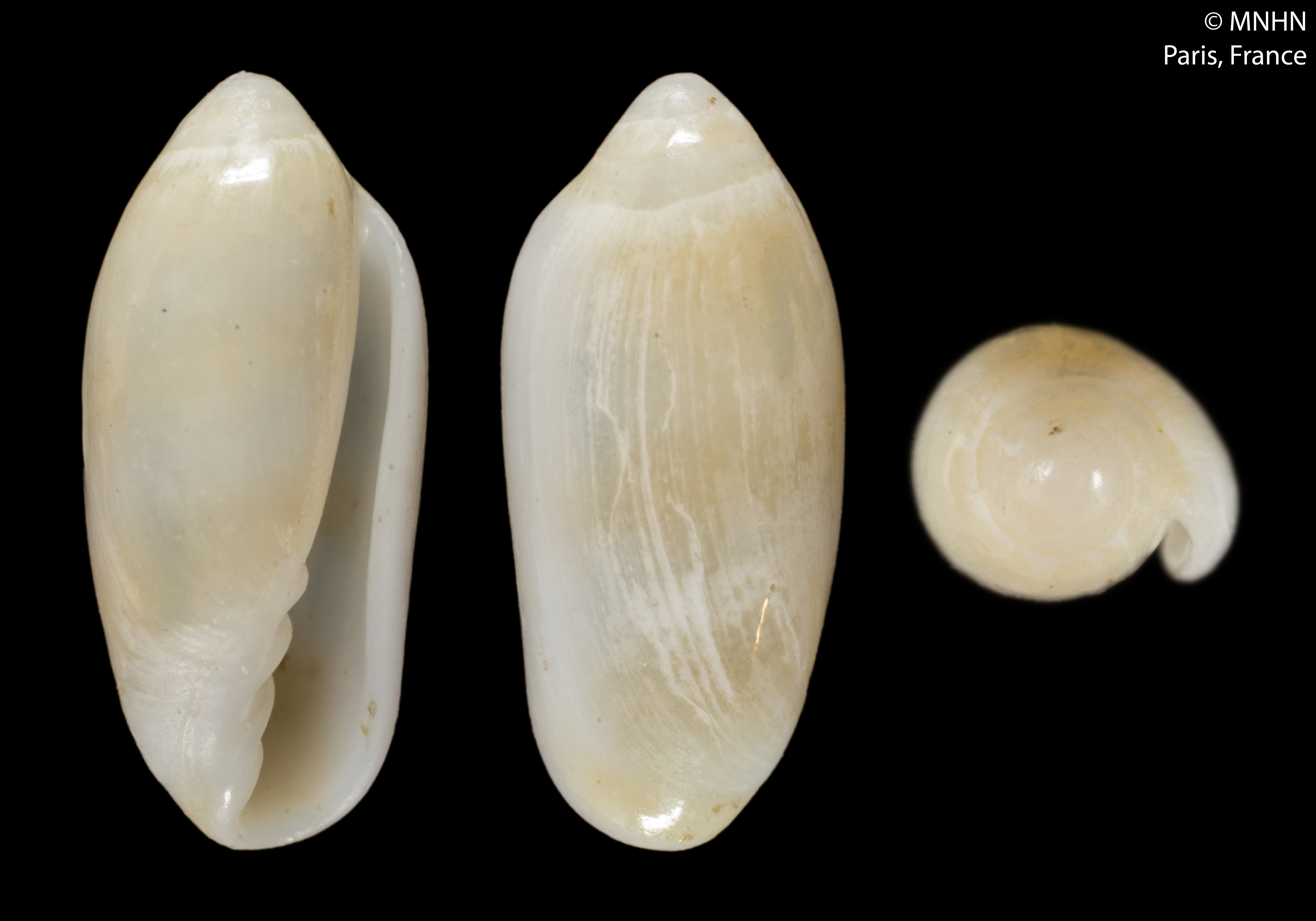
- Shell of Volvarina aladunniae (holotype in the MNHN, Paris)

Scientific classification
- Kingdom: Animalia
- Phylum: Mollusca
- Class: Gastropoda
- Subclass: Caenogastropoda
- Order: Neogastropoda
- Family: Marginellidae
- Subfamily: Marginellinae
- Genus: Volvarina
- Species: V. aladunniae

Binomial name
- Volvarina aladunniae Ortea, 2014

Synonyms

= Volvarina aladunniae =

Species of gastropod

Volvarina aladunniae is a species of sea snail, a marine gastropod mollusk in the family Marginellidae, the margin snails.

== Etymology ==
The specific name aladunniae honors Professor Jill Farrant, who received the L'Oréal-UNESCO Awards for Women in Science in 2012 for her research on how plants survive in drought conditions. The epithet is derived from a name given to her, Aladunni, meaning "she who survives everything."

== Description ==
The shell is solid, oval-elongated, and milky white in color. The length of the shell attains 8.37 mm, and its diameter is 3.58 mm. It features a short spire. The outer lip is thickened and smooth. The aperture is as long as the shell and is narrower at the top. There are four distinct, oblique columellar plaits (folds), with the posterior one being the smallest.

== Distribution and habitat ==
This marine species occurs off Guadeloupe in the Caribbean Sea. The type locality is the bay of Petit-Havre, Guadeloupe, where it was discovered in sandy bottoms with algae at a depth between 15 and 20 meters.
