= Harry Oppenheimer Fellowship Award =

The Harry Oppenheimer Fellowship Award
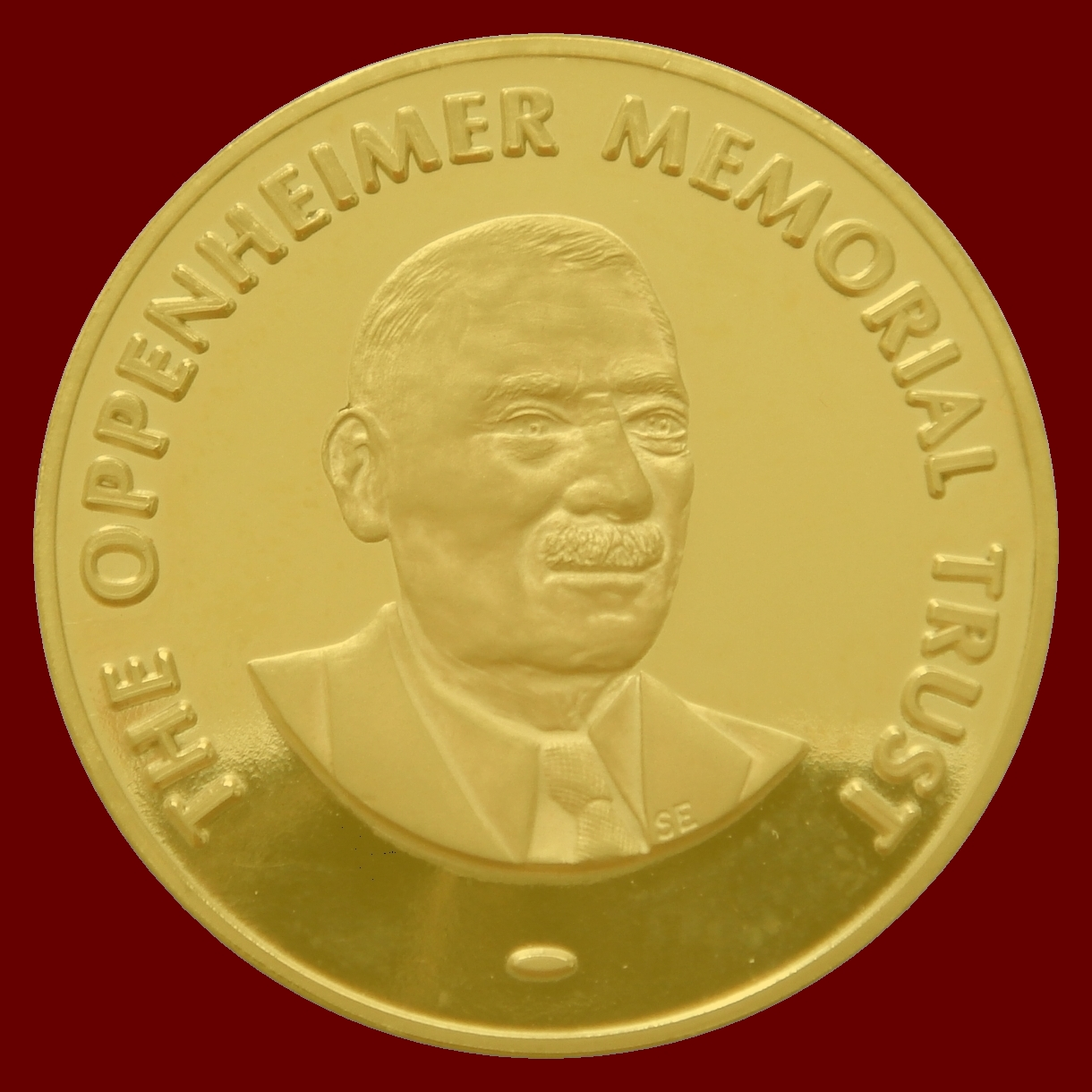
- Awarded for: The top award for research on the African continent awarded to leading scholars who have a sustained record of outstanding research and intellectual achievement at the highest level.
- Country: South Africa
- Presented by: The Oppenheimer Memorial Trust
- First award: 2001

The Harry Oppenheimer Fellowship Award is awarded annually by the Oppenheimer Memorial Trust. It is considered the top award for research on the African continent.

== In Memory of Harry Oppenheimer ==
The Award was created in 2001, in South Africa, by the Trustees of the Oppenheimer Memorial Trust, itself established in 1958 by Harry Oppenheimer in memory of his father, Sir Ernest Oppenheimer.

The philanthropic vision of the once-richest man in the world is embedded within three foundations:

1. The Brenthurst Foundation contributes energetically to developing economic empowerment in Africa.
2. The Oppenheimer Memorial Trust funds and encourages science, the arts and the search for knowledge, through various grants and initiatives, and awards Africa's premier research prize, the Harry Oppenheimer Fellowship Award.
3. The Brenthurst Library which houses one of the largest collections of rare Africana in the world and the celebrated transcripts of Nelson Mandela's trials.

=== How the Fellowship Award is bestowed ===
Awardees are leading scholars who have a sustained record of outstanding research and intellectual achievement at the highest level. They must have demonstrated a capacity for and a commitment to knowledge transfer to their fellow citizens. Up to now the Award has only been presented to South Africans or South Africa-based academics.

The Award is made by a select committee and approved by the Trustees in December of each year. The Secretary General of the Academy of Science of South Africa chairs the selection proceedings.

The remittance ceremony takes place in April following the year of the Award, at the Oppenheimers’ residence, Brenthurst, in Johannesburg. The Award (a gold medal and a monetary prize) is bestowed by Mrs. Harry (Bridget) Oppenheimer.

==== List of Laureates ====
Source: Oppenheimer Memorial Trust

- 2022: Michael Wingfield, University of Pretoria
- 2018: Valerie Mizrahi, University of Cape Town
- 2017: Mark Solms, University of Cape Town
- 2016: Jointly awarded to University of Pretoria and University of Cape Town faculty member Professor Robert (Bob) Millar for his work in neuroendocrinology and Professor Lynn Morris, Research Professor at Wits University and Research Associate at the Centre for the Aids Programme of Research in South Africa (CAPRISA)
- 2015: Jointly awarded to Brenda Wingfield, Professor of Genetics, University of Pretoria and Xolela Mangcu, professor in the Department of Sociology at the University of Cape Town
- 2014: Helen Rees, Personal Professor in the Wits Department of Obstetrics and Gynaecology
- 2013: Keertan Dheda, Professor of Respiratory Medicine and Head of UCT's Division of Pulmonology
- 2012: Awarded Robin Crewe, Zoology and Entomology, University of Pretoria for his work on bees
- 2011: Les Underhill, Director of the Animal Demography Unit at the University of Cape Town. He will use the funds to continue a lifelong project entitled "Building early warning systems for Biodiversity in South Africa".
- 2010: Duncan Mitchell, Emeritus Professor at the University of the Witwatersrand. He investigates the responses of large mammals to global warming and to southern hemisphere drying.
- 2009: Jill Farrant, who holds the research chair in the molecular physiology of plant desiccation tolerance at the University of Cape Town and who is investigating the properties of the mostly South African drought-resistant "resurrection plants". She will use the award funds to allow her to work with Professor Felix Keller of the University of Zurich's Institute of Plant Biology and with Doctor Francesco Loreto of Italy's Consiglio Nazionale delle Ricerche (National Research Council) who investigates minuscule lipid "volatiles" (chemical signals).
- 2008: Philippe-Joseph Salazar, University of Cape Town. Salazar, who studied with philosophers Louis Althusser and Emmanuel Levinas, is an alumnus of the prestigious École Normale Supérieure (France). A past director at Jacques Derrida’s foundation, Collège International de Philosophie, he is one of the main disciples of Marc Fumaroli, himself a laureate of the Balzan Prize. His pioneering work on rhetoric has placed him at the forefront of this new discipline. He is a noted chronicler on rhetoric and politics for the French public intellectual news magazine L'Annuel des idées.
- 2007: Jointly awarded to Jeff Guy South African History Project and Winston Hide. Jeff Guy is a leading historian of traditional Africanism. Winston Hide is a leader in stem cells research in relation to recurrence of cancer in recovered patients.
- 2006: Paul Cilliers, University of Stellenbosch in recognition of his outstanding achievements in developing a general understanding of the characteristics and nature of complex systems.
- 2005: Norman Owen-Smith, an A-rated scientist in the School of Animal, Plant and Environmental Sciences at the University of the Witwatersrand Prize was awarded in recognition for his outstanding work in helping to foster an understanding of the dynamics of large mammalian herbivores in changing environments.
- 2004: Jointly awarded to Igor Barashenkov and Frank Brombacher, Director of the MRC Unit for Immunology of Infectious Diseases in the IIDMM, University of Cape Town.
- 2003: No award presented.
- 2002: Jan-Hendrik S. Hofmeyr of the Department of Biochemistry at the University of Stellenbosch, for his pioneering work on the organization and behaviour of the living cell.
- 2001: David Glasser of the School of Process and Material Engineering at the University of the Witwatersrand was the first recipient of the award.

== See also ==
- List of general science and technology awards
