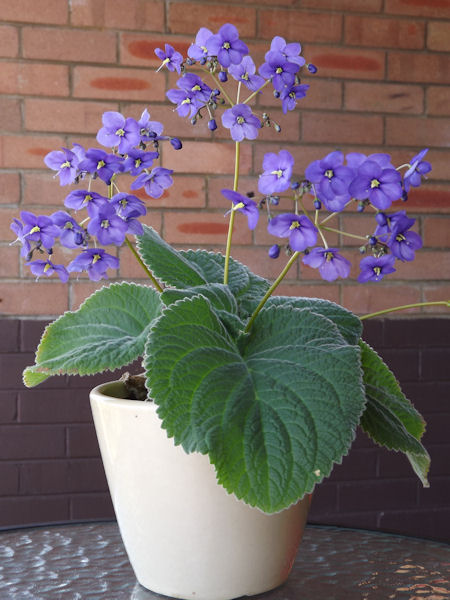
- Boea hygroscopica

Scientific classification
- Kingdom: Plantae
- Clade: Embryophytes
- Clade: Tracheophytes
- Clade: Spermatophytes
- Clade: Angiosperms
- Clade: Eudicots
- Clade: Asterids
- Order: Lamiales
- Family: Gesneriaceae
- Subfamily: Didymocarpoideae
- Genus: Boea; Comm. ex Lam.

Type species
- Boea magellanica Lam.

Species
- See here

Synonyms
- Chleterus Raf.

= Boea =

Genus of flowering plants

Boea is a genus of plants in the family Gesneriaceae native to Australia, China, India, Malaysia, Myanmar, Philippines, Polynesia, Solomon Islands, Thailand, Papua New Guinea, Indonesia, Nepal, Bhutan, Cambodia, Vietnam, and Laos. Some Boea species are known as types of resurrection plant due to their ability to survive desiccation (e.g. Boea hygroscopica).

== Description ==
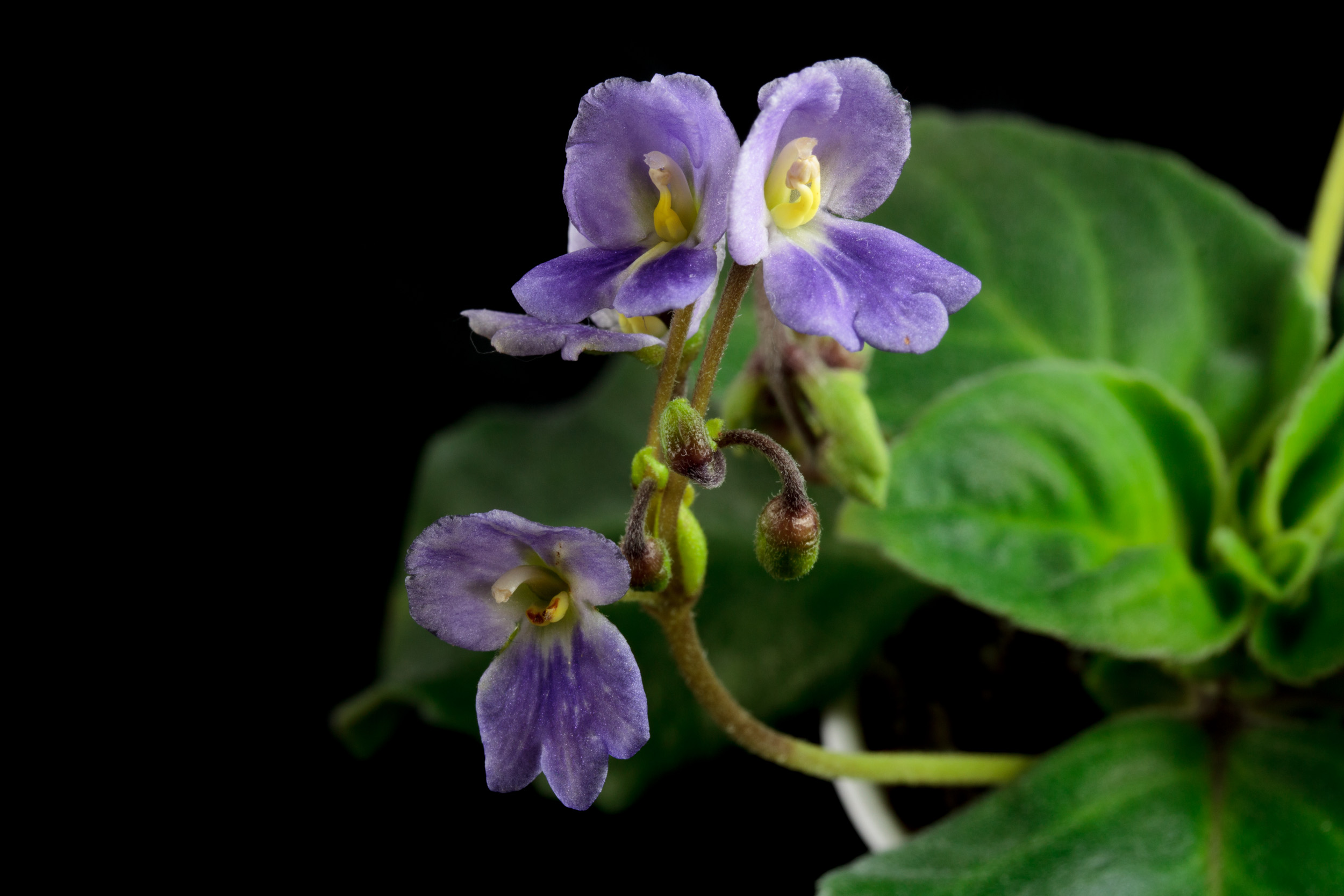
Boea hemsleyana flowers

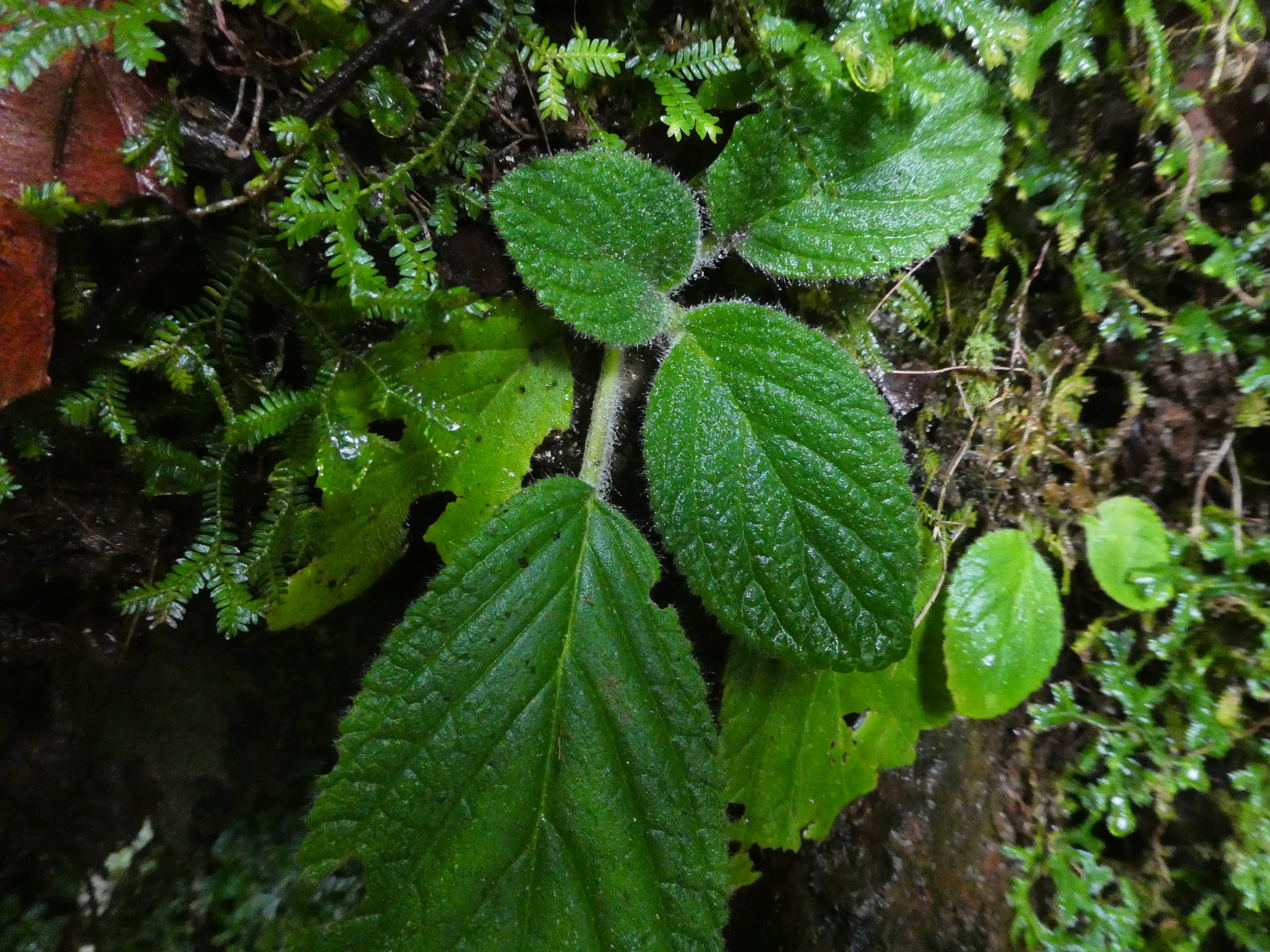
Boea hygroscopica growing in Wooroonooran National Park, Queensland, Australia

Boea are perennial, lithophytic or terrestrial, caulescent or rosulate, rhizomatous herbs. The sepals are free. The petals are pink to purple. The anthers are strongly divergent. The fruit is twisted.

=== Cytology ===
The chromosome count is 2n = 16, 32.

== Taxonomy ==
It was described by Jean-Baptiste Lamarck in 1785 based on previous work by Philibert Commerson. The type species is Boea magellanica Lam.

=== Etymology ===
The genus may be named in honour of Mlle Beau, the niece of a friend of Philibert Commerson. It may also be named after M. le Beau, the brother-in-law of Philibert Commerson who first collected a Boea species.

=== Species ===
12 species are accepted:

- Boea dennisii B.L.Burtt
- Boea hemsleyana B.L.Burtt
- Boea hians Burkill
- Boea hygroscopica F.Muell.
- Boea kinnearii (F.Muell.) B.L.Burtt
- Boea lawesii (F.Muell.) H.O.Forbes
- Boea magellanica Lam.
- Boea mollis Schltr.
- Boea morobensis C.Puglisi
- Boea resupinata Zich & B.Gray
- Boea rosselensis B.L.Burtt
- Boea urvillei C.B.Clarke

== Distribution and habitat ==
The centre of the distribution is eastern Papua New Guinea and the Solomon Islands.

== Cultivation ==
The frost tender Boea may be grown in partial shade in humus-rich substrates. It can be propagated by seed and by leaf cuttings or division.
