= Jan-Hendrik S. Hofmeyr =

South African scientist (born 1953)

Jan-Hendrik Hofmeyr FRSSAf
- Born: Jan-Hendrik Servaas Hofmeyr; 25 August 1953 (age 73); Durban, South Africa
- Education: Stellenbosch University
- Known for: metabolic control analysis, metabolic regulation
- Awards: Harry Oppenheimer Fellowship Award and Gold Medal (2002); Beckman Coulter Gold Medal of the South African Society for Biochemistry and Molecular Biology (2003)
- Scientific career
- Fields: Biochemistry
- Workplaces: Stellenbosch University
- Thesis: Studies in steady-state modelling and control analysis of metabolic systems (1986)

Jan-Hendrik Hofmeyr FRSSAf (born 25 August 1953) is a South African scientist, who is one of the leaders in the field of metabolic control analysis and the quantitative analysis of metabolic regulation.

== Early life and education ==
Hofmeyr was born in Durban, South Africa. He obtained BSc hons. (1976), MSc (1978) and PhD (1986) at the University of Stellenbosch. While preparing his doctoral thesis he spent six months with Athel Cornish-Bowden at Birmingham and three months with Henrik Kacser at Edinburgh. Both of these visits led to long-term collaborations.

== Research ==
Hofmeyr's doctoral research concerned the use of graphical patterns to elucidate chains of interaction in metabolic regulation, later published in the European Journal of Biochemistry, and his collaboration with Kacser led to a study of the effect of moiety-conservation on control of pathways. At this time he and Cornish-Bowden were concerned that the development of metabolic control analysis seemed to be almost independent of the knowledge of metabolic regulation that had grown from the recognition of regulatory mechanisms in the 1950s and 1960s, most notably the importance of feedback inhibition and cooperative behaviour of enzymes. This led them to propose a way of quantifying metabolic regulation, the first of a series of publications that culminated in an analysis of the role of supply and demand in biochemical systems, i.e. an analysis of how negative feedback allow metabolic pathways to respond to changes in the demand for metabolites while resisting variations in the supply of starting materials.

During the 21st century Hofmeyr has applied ideas of control analysis to ecosystems, and to the understanding of the self-organization of cell function in the spirit of Robert Rosen. More recently he has worked on the development of code biology, the novel discipline founded by Marcello Barbieri that recognizes that the genetic code is just one of several codes used and needed by biological systems.

== Career ==
Appointed as Junior Lecturer in the Biochemistry Department of the University of Stellenbosch in 1975, Hofmeyr eventually became Distinguished Professor in 2014 and then Emeritus Professor in 2019. Between 2009 and 2015, he was co-director and then Director of the Centre for Studies in Complexity at Stellenbosch, which he had co-founded in 2009.

== Awards ==
- Harry Oppenheimer Fellowship Award and Gold Medal (2002)
- Beckman Coulter Gold Medal of the South African Society for Biochemistry and Molecular Biology (2003)
- Havenga prize for Biological Sciences from the Suid-Afrikaanse Akademie vir Wetenskap en Kuns (South African Academy for Science and Art) (2009)

== Performance art ==
In addition to his scientific research, Hofmeyr is a classically trained flute player and also plays the baroque flute, guitar and banjo. He was one of the composers and performers who helped launch the Afrikaans "Kabaret" tradition in the 1980s in South Africa, through his work with authors, composers and directors. His classic scores for lyrics of Hennie Aucamp and Etienne van Heerden have become standard items in Afrikaans popular music. He has also played older characters in productions of the University of Stellenbosch Drama Department.
