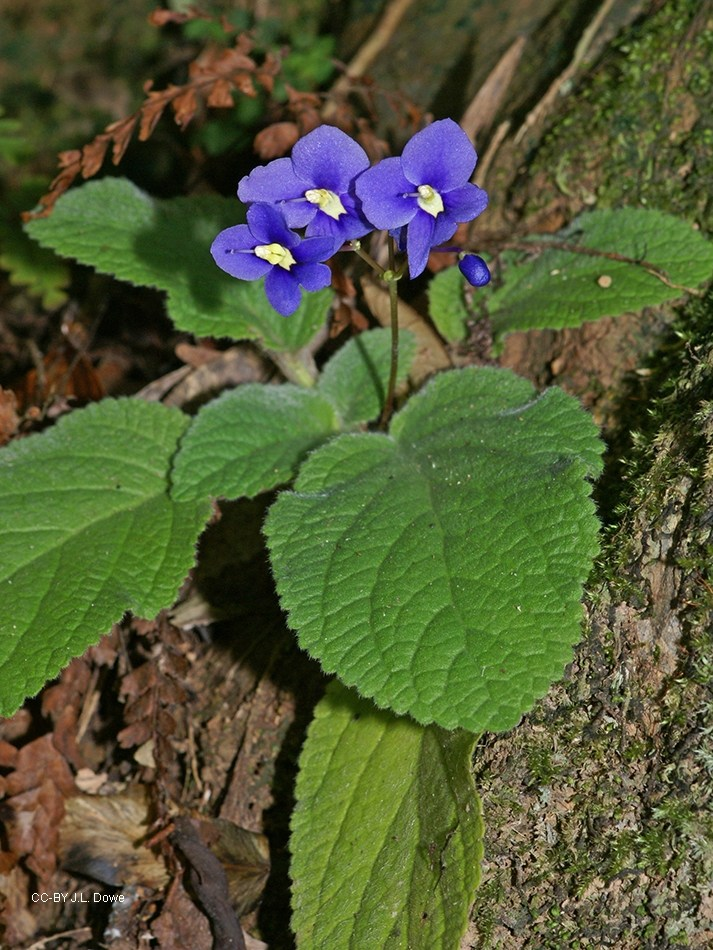

Conservation status
- Least Concern (NCA)

Scientific classification
- Kingdom: Plantae
- Clade: Embryophytes
- Clade: Tracheophytes
- Clade: Spermatophytes
- Clade: Angiosperms
- Clade: Eudicots
- Clade: Asterids
- Order: Lamiales
- Family: Gesneriaceae
- Genus: Boea
- Species: B. hygroscopica

Binomial name
- Boea hygroscopica F.Muell.

= Boea hygroscopica =

Rock violet

Species of flowering plant

Boea hygroscopica (known as rock violet) is one of 15 species of flowering plant of the Boea genus in the gesneriad family. It is considered a 'resurrection plant' because of its ability to withstand virtually total water loss. Detached leaves of B. hydroscopica can withstand desiccation by increasing the small amount of constitutive glutathione by up to 50 times.

It is endemic to Queensland, Australia, and is found growing along creek beds, on moist banks and moss-covered rocks in rainforest, open forest, vine forest and gallery forest.

== Description ==
Boea hygroscopica is an herbaceous or woody plant growing no taller than 1 m (3 ft 3 in). The flowers are 20–22 millimetres (0.8–0.9 in) in diameter and the peduncles (flower stems) are 85–90 millimetres (3.3–3.5 in) long. There are 5 petals and they are dimorphic, with 2 larger ones about 10 by 8 mm (0.4 by 0.3 in) and 3 smaller ones about 10 by 5 mm (0.4 by 0.2 in).

== Gallery ==
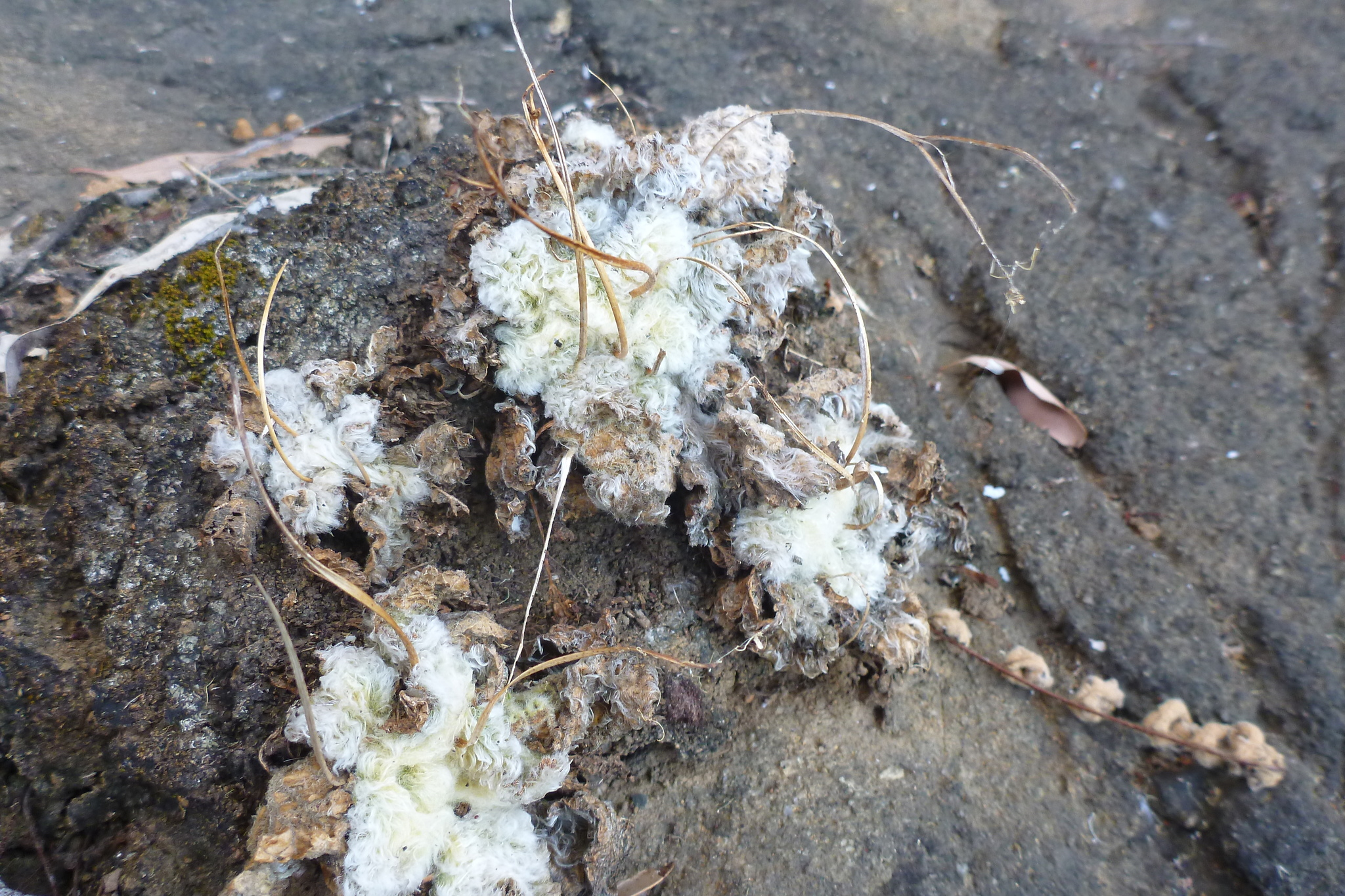
In desiccated state

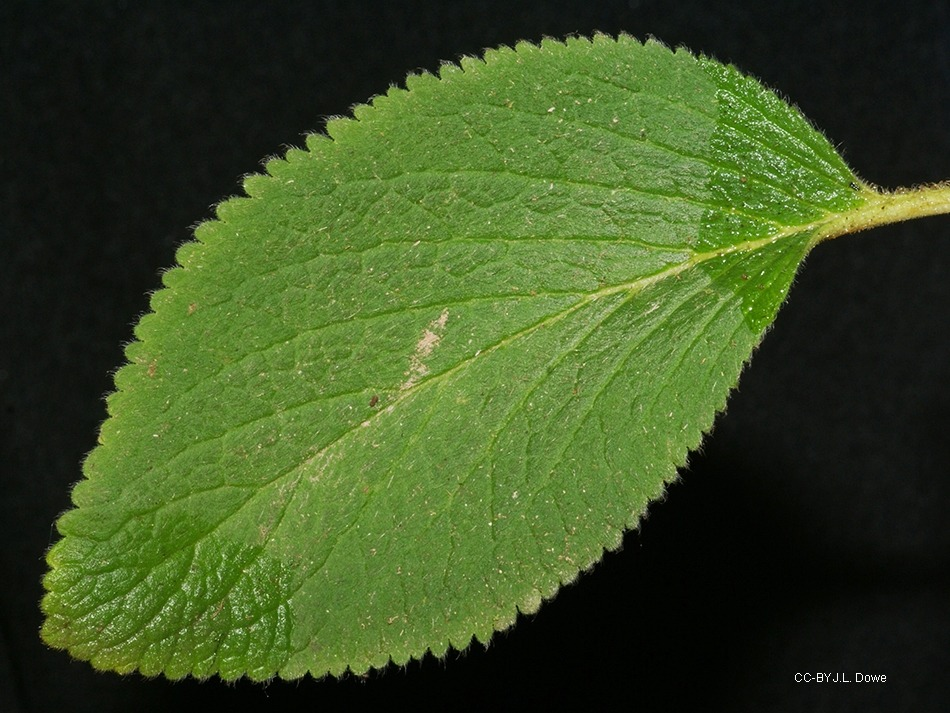
Leaf detail

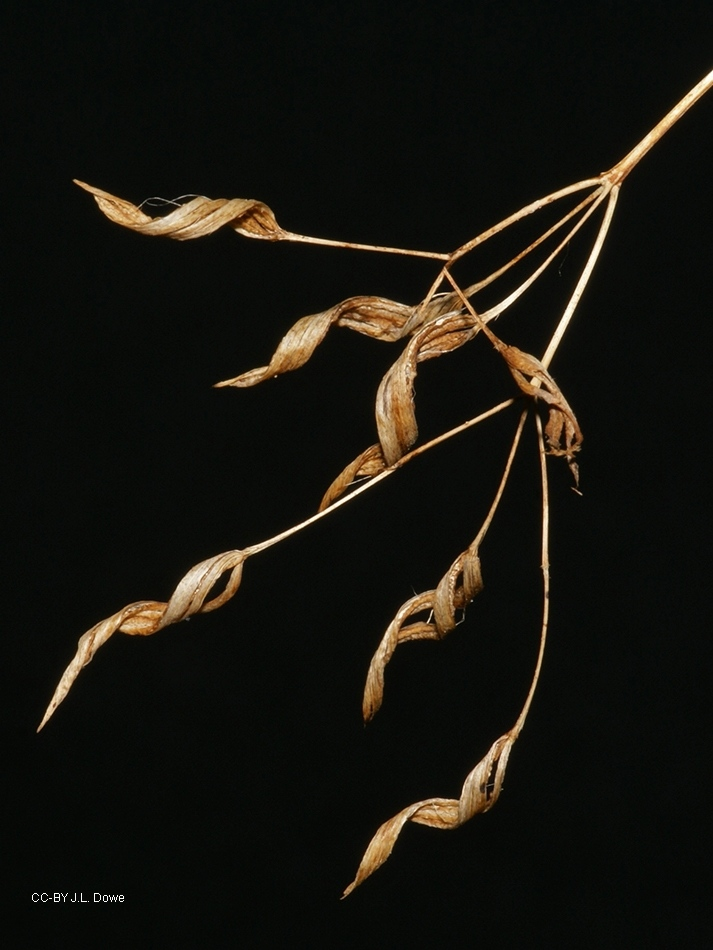
Fruit

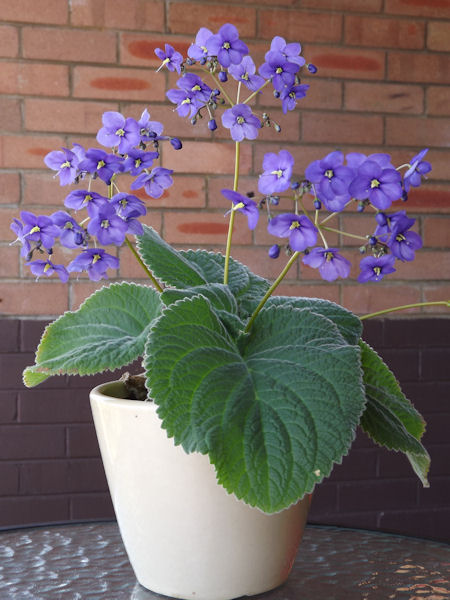
In cultivation
