= Keertan Dheda =

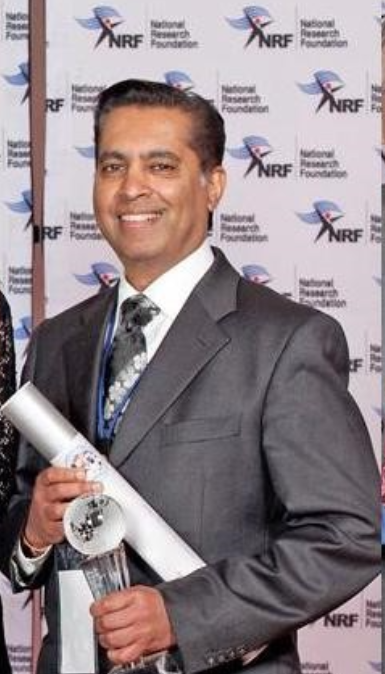
- Born: 1969 (age 56–57)
- Occupations: Researcher; professor; medical doctor
- Known for: Scientific contributions to the field of respiratory infections including tuberculosis.

Academic background
- Education: University of Witwatersrand, University College London

Academic work
- Discipline: Medicine
- Sub-discipline: Respiratory Medicine; Immunology; Antimicrobial Resistance; Tuberculosis
- Institutions: London School of Hygiene and Tropical Medicine, University of Cape Town, University College London H-index = 111 Number of registered patents: 11 Spin-off companies founded: 1 Antrum Biotech with his wife Khilona Radia Charities founded and directed: 1 Free of TB

Keertan Dheda MBBCh (Wits), FCP(SA), FCCP, PhD (Lond), FRCP (Lond), born in 1970, is a Professor of Mycobacteriology and Global health at the London School of Hygiene and Tropical Medicine (LSHTM) with an extra-mural joint appointment at the University of Cape Town (UCT), where he is a Professor of Respiratory Medicine.

He is a global research leader in the field of TB immunopathogenesis and TB diagnosis (Google h-index of 111 and Scopus h-Index of 89 [As of 2026].

== Research ==
Dheda’s work has catalysed the reconfiguration of global public health policy from one of passive TB case-finding (self-reporting by patients) to one of active case-finding (community-based unearthing of cases), and he has pioneered novel models outlining how this could be accomplished ^{[1][2]}. This has become even more important in the post COVID-19 era due to the worsening under-detection of TB ^{[3]}. In contradistinction to traditional accuracy-based evaluation methodology, his work has focused on the application of randomised-controlled trial design for the evaluation of new TB diagnostic tools, to tease out impact on patient important outcomes ^{[1][2][4][5][6]}. This together with other studies ^{[7][8]}_{,} has led to the development of new standards of care for tuberculosis diagnostics and their application to clinical practice (and in specific subgroups).

His work has had substantial impact on global health, including the transmission and management of drug-resistant TB that has informed management decisions by national TB programmes, including screening and infection control policies for health care workers ^{[9][10]}. His work indicated that highly drug-resistant strains of TB were not less infectious due to genetic ‘fitness cost’, as previously anticipated, but that there was ongoing widespread transmission of such strains within community settings ^{[11]}. This has highlighted the important contribution of TB to the burgeoning antimicrobial resistance problem confronting the world (~30% of the contribution to the estimated global cost of antimicrobial resistance will be due to drug-resistant TB) ^{[12]}. The work has facilitated the acceleration of containment strategies and newer regimens for drug-resistant TB ^{[13][14][15][16]}. Related novel work, for the first time, demonstrated differential drug penetration into human lung TB cavities and its contribution to drug resistance amplification ^{[17]}.

Scientific breakthroughs improving the understanding of TB immunopathogenesis have included the development and validation of the ‘first in man’ human lung challenge model for M. tuberculosis complex that involved the installation of live mycobacteria into the lungs of human volunteers ^{[18]}, and development of the ‘first in man’ transcriptomic map of human TB cavities (using explanted lung samples) that has provided foundational knowledge to unravel the genesis of human TB-associated lung cavitation, which remains largely unexplained ^{[19]}.

The lung centric work was leveraged to better understand the immunopathogenesis of COVID-19. A new immune-phenotype of prolonged lung-specific viral replication was described debunking the notion that viral replication ended after the first week of symptoms followed by a phase of leucocyte hyperactivation ^{[20]}. Rather, prolonged viral replication and leucocyte hyperactivation phases may occur concurrently, and this work suggested that some patients may benefit from anti-viral therapy when on mechanical ventilation (currently not endorsed by clinical guidelines). Further work demonstrated, for the first time, the ability to systematically culture SARS-CoV-2 from cough aerosol with a particle diameter < 10uM (particles that can remain suspended in air for several hours and that can be inhaled deeply into the lung) ^{[21]}. These data provided the ‘missing link’ to solidify the notion that aerosol-based infectiousness of COVID-19 is a dominant method of transmission (the heterogeneity in infectiousness of participants also supports the super-spreader hypothesis). Up to this point the final proof needed to justify major public health spending to implement transmission-interrupting interventions (essentially improved ventilation) was lacking.

== Publications ==
1. Esmail A, ..., Dheda K. Comparison of two diagnostic intervention packages for community-based active case finding for tuberculosis: an open-label randomized controlled trial. Nature Medicine. 2023. (Senior author; IF = 82.9)
2. Theron, G, ..., Dheda K. Feasibility, accuracy and clinical effect of point-of-care Xpert MTB/RIF testing for tuberculosis in primary-care settings in Africa: a multicentre, randomised controlled trial. The Lancet. 2014; S0140-6736(13)62073-5. (Senior author; IF = 168.9; cited 342 times since publication [Scopus]; cited 520 times since publication [Google Scholar]). CITATION CLASSIC.
3. Dheda K, et al. The intersecting pandemics of tuberculosis and COVID-19: population-level and patient-level impact, clinical presentation, and corrective interventions. Lancet Respir Med. 2022. 10(6):603-622. (First and senior author; IF = 102.64)
4. Peter JG,., Dheda K. Effect on mortality of point-of-care, urine-based lipoarabinomannan testing to guide tuberculosis treatment initiation in HIV- positive hospital inpatients: a pragmatic, parallel-group, multicountry, open-label, randomised controlled trial. The Lancet. 2016:140-6736(15) 01092-2. (Senior author; IF = 168.9; cited 184 times since publication [Scopus]; cited 265 times since publication [Google Scholar]). CITATION CLASSIC.
5. https://classic.clinicaltrials.gov/ct2/show/NCT04303104
6. https://clinicaltrials.gov/study/NCT05220163
7. Patel VB,., Dheda K. Diagnostic accuracy of quantitative PCR (Xpert MTB/RRIF) for tuberculosis meningitis in a high burden setting: a prospective study. PloS Medicine. 2013; 10(10), e1001536. (Senior author; IF = 15.8; cited 138 times since publication [Scopus]; cited 209 times since publication [Google Scholar]). CITATION CLASSIC.
8. Theron G, .., Dheda K. Accuracy and impact of Xpert MTB/RIF for the diagnosis of smear-negative or sputum-scarce tuberculosis using bronchoalveolar lavage fluid. Thorax. 2013. 68(11):1043-51. (Senior author; IF = 10; cited 82 times since publication [Scopus]; cited 130 times since publication [Google Scholar]). CITATION CLASSIC.
9. O'Donnell MR,.., Dheda K. High Incidence of Hospital Admissions with Multidrug Resistant and Extensively Drug Resistant Tuberculosis among South African Health Care Workers. Ann Internal Med. 2010;153(8):516-22. (Senior author; IF = 39.2; cited 157 times since publication [Scopus]; cited 256 times since publication [Google Scholar]). CITATION CLASSIC.
10. Adams S,.., Dheda K. Incidence of occupational latent tuberculosis infection in South African healthcare workers. Eur Respir J. 2015. 45(5):1364-73. (Senior author; IF = 24.3)
11. Theron G,.., Dheda K. Bacterial and host determinants of cough aerosol culture positivity in patients with drug-resistant versus drug-susceptible tuberculosis. Nature Medicine. 2020. (Senior author; IF = 82.9)
12. Pooran A,.., Dheda K. What is the Cost of Diagnosis and Management of Drug Resistant Tuberculosis in South Africa? PLoS One. 2013. 8(1): e54587. (Senior author; IF = 3.7; cited 139 times since publication [Scopus]; cited 217 times since publication [Google Scholar]). CITATION CLASSIC.
13. Esmail A,.., Dheda K. An All-Oral 6-Month Regimen for Multidrug-Resistant TB (the NExT Study): A Multicenter, Randomized Controlled Trial. Am J Respir Crit Care Med. 2022. 15;205(10):1214-1227. (Senior author; IF = 24.7)
14. Pietersen E,.., Dheda K. Long-term outcomes of patients with extensively drug-resistant tuberculosis in South Africa: a cohort study. The Lancet. 2014; 383 (9924). 1230-1239. (Senior author; IF = 168.9; cited 192 times since publication [Scopus]; cited 290 times since publication [Google Scholar]). CITATION CLASSIC.
15. Dheda K, et al. Outcomes, infectiousness, and transmission dynamics of patients with extensively drug-resistant tuberculosis and home-discharged patients with programmatically incurable tuberculosis: a prospective cohort study. Lancet Resp Med. 2017. 2600(16):30433-7. (First and senior author; IF = 76.2; cited 95 times since publication [Scopus]; cited 136 times since publication [Google Scholar]). CITATION CLASSIC.
16. Olayanju O,., Dheda K. Long-term bedaquiline-related treatment outcomes in patients with extensively drug-resistant tuberculosis from South Africa. Eur Respir J. 2018. 51 (5). (Senior author; IF = 24.3; cited 69 times since publication [Scopus]; cited 104 times since publication [Google Scholar]). CITATION CLASSIC.
17. Dheda K, et al. Gumbo T. Drug-Penetration Gradients Associated with Acquired Drug Resistance in Patients with Tuberculosis. Am J Respir Crit Care Med. 2018. 198 (9):1208-1219. (First and senior author; IF = 24.7; cited 95 times since publication [Scopus]; cited 123 times since publication [Google Scholar]). CITATION CLASSIC.
18. Davids M,.., Dheda K. A Human Lung Challenge Model to Evaluate the Safety and Immunogenicity of PPD and Live Bacillus Calmette-Guérin. Am J Respir Crit Care Med. 2020. 201(10):1277-1291. (Senior author; IF = 24.7)
19. Dheda K, et al. Spatial Network Mapping of Pulmonary Multidrug-Resistant Tuberculosis Cavities Using RNA Sequencing. Am J Respir Crit Care Med. 2019. (First and senior author; IF = 24.7)
20. Tomasicchio M,.., Dheda K. SARS-CoV-2 viral replication persists in the human lung for several weeks after onset of symptomatic severe COVID-19 and is associated with attenuated pulmonary immunity and variant-specific clinical sequalae. Am J Resp Crit Care Med. 2023. In Press.
21. Jaumdally S,.., Dheda K. Frequency, kinetics and determinants of viable SARS-CoV-2 in bioaerosols from ambulatory COVID-19 patients infected with the Beta, Delta or Omicron variants. Nature Communications. 2023. In Press.

== Awards and recognition ==
Dheda received the International Union Against Tuberculosis and Lung Disease Scientific Award, and the 2018 European Union-funded EDCTP Scientific Leadership Award. Other awards have included the Harry Oppenheimer Fellowship Award, the NSTF BHP-Billiton Research award, and MRC Scientific Achievement Award (Platinum). More recent awards include the Alan Pifer Award 2023, the vice-chancellor of UCT's annual prize in recognition of outstanding welfare-relate research, the Academy of Science of South Africa's "Science for Society" Gold Medal for Outstanding Achievement in 2024, and the International Princess Chichibu Memorial Tuberculosis Award (2025), which recognises contributions to TB research, elimination and global public health. Momentously, in 2026, Dheda received the Order of Mapungubwe, South Africa's highest civilian national honour, awarded by the President to citizens whose exceptional achievements have had an international impact and served the country's interests. He has been profiled in The Lancet, the Business Day newspaper, IOL, News24, and Carte Blanche, a high-profile news programme in South Africa.

== Leadership ==
Dheda serves or has served on the editorial board of several high impact journals including the American Journal of Respiratory and Critical Care Medicine, Lancet Respiratory Medicine, and the British Medical Journal, amongst others. He has been part of several advisory and adjudication panels including those of the WHO, NIH, EU and the Wellcome Trust (Discovery Grant panel). Dheda is a former president of the South African Thoracic Society, is the founder and co-director of the charity, Free of TB, which provides support and healthcare to poor and needy persons afflicted with TB.

== See also ==
- London School of Hygiene & Tropical Medicine
- University College London
- Keertan Dheda | LSHTM
