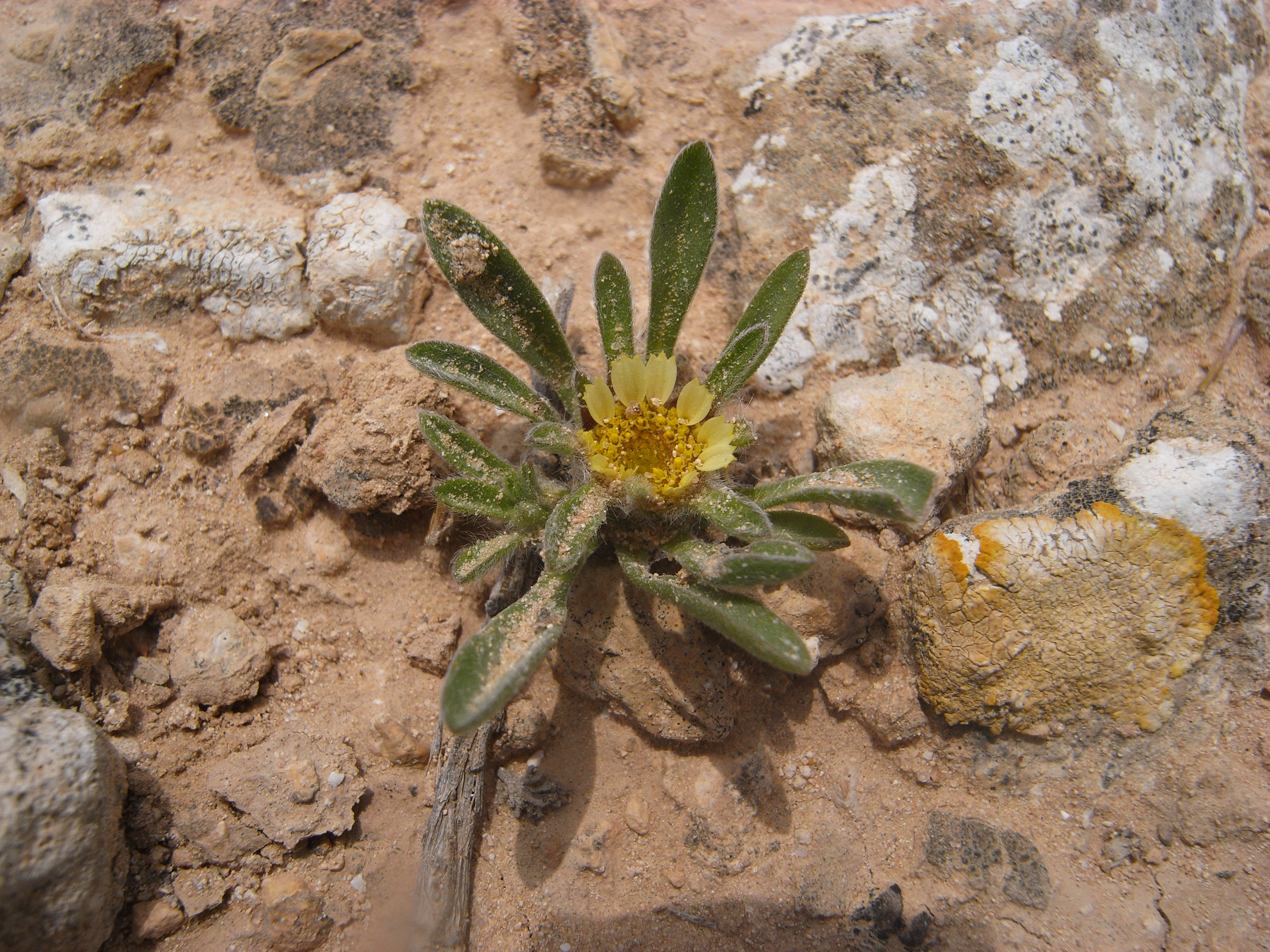

Scientific classification
- Kingdom: Plantae
- Clade: Tracheophytes
- Clade: Angiosperms
- Clade: Eudicots
- Clade: Asterids
- Order: Asterales
- Family: Asteraceae
- Genus: Pallenis
- Species: P. hierochuntica

Binomial name
- Pallenis hierochuntica (Michon) Greuter

Synonyms
- Asteriscus aquaticus var. pygmaeus DC. Asteriscus pygmaeus (DC.) Coss. & Durieu; Odontospermum pygmaeum (DC.) O.Hoffm.

= Pallenis hierochuntica =

Species of flowering plant

Pallenis hierochuntica (common names include rose of Jericho and dinosaur plant) is a species of Pallenis that is notable for being a resurrection plant.

== See also ==
- Anastatica hierochuntica
