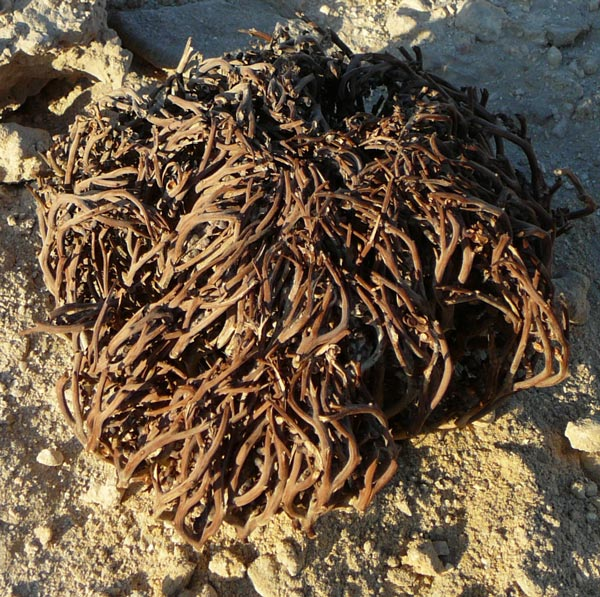
- Anastatica hierochuntica

Scientific classification
- Kingdom: Plantae
- Clade: Embryophytes
- Clade: Tracheophytes
- Clade: Spermatophytes
- Clade: Angiosperms
- Clade: Eudicots
- Clade: Rosids
- Order: Brassicales
- Family: Brassicaceae
- Genus: Anastatica; L.
- Species: A. hierochuntica

Binomial name
- Anastatica hierochuntica L.

= Anastatica =

Genus of flowering plants

Anastatica is a monotypic genus of flowering plants in the family Brassicaceae containing the single species Anastatica hierochuntica or the true rose of Jericho. The plant is a small gray annual herb that rarely grows above 15 centimetres (6 in) high, and bears minute white flowers. It is a capable of hygroscopic expansion and retraction. However, it is not a true resurrection plant, because the plant's dead tissues do not revive and turn green.

This species is not to be confused with Selaginella lepidophylla, also sometimes referred to as "rose of Jericho", or "false rose of Jericho", which is a true resurrection plant that can revive from a dried state and regain the processes of respiration and photosynthesis.

== Names ==
Common names include Maryam's flower, flower of St Mary, St. Mary's flower, Mary's flower, white mustard flower and rose of Jericho.

The rose of Jericho name is based on Sirach or Ecclesiasticus 24:14.

== Range ==
Anastatica is found in arid areas in the Middle East and the Sahara Desert, including parts of North Africa and regions of Iran, Egypt, Israel, Saudi Arabia, Iraq, Jordan and Pakistan.

== Description ==
A plant with great resistance to desiccation. Despite it being an annual, the plant lignifies after completing its life cycle, turning into a persistent woody skeleton. Its branches have the property of contracting with dryness into the shape of a closed fist, maintaining its seed bank. The dead skeletal form can remain in situ for many years, reopening with moisture or contact with water. After the rainy season, the plant dries up, dropping leaves and curling branches into a tight ball, and aestivates. Within the ball, the fruits remain attached and closed, protecting the seeds and preventing them from being dispersed prematurely. The seeds are very hardy and can remain dormant for years. Moistened again in a later rainy season, the ball uncurls and the plant wakes up from its dormant state, which causes the capsular fruits to open to disperse the seeds. If water is sufficient, the dispersed seeds germinate within hours. After it curls, it is easy for the wind itself to lift and drag it large distances, making them obligatory travelers through steppes and deserts crossing the borders of various countries in Asia and disseminating their seeds for all of them.

A fraction of the seeds are dispersed in the vicinity of the parent plant by raindrops hitting a spoon-like appendix on the seeds. The seeds have a sticky coat that helps them adhere to the soil, but they also may be carried downstream by surface wash. However, seeds swept downstream do not survive.

The process of curling and uncurling is completely reversible and can be repeated many times. The ability of the plant to do this is attributed to the presence of trehalose, a disaccharide sugar involved in several mechanisms of cryptobiosis. Although the rehydrated plant sometimes is described as putting out new leaves, flowers, and fruits, this is disputed; instead, the seeds may sometimes germinate and sprout new plants while still seated in the fruit on the dead parent plant.

Anastatica has been described as the most famous tumbleweed. Once dry, the ball is said to become detached and is dispersed by wind. This tumbleweed habit has been interpreted as a mechanism of avoiding burial in dunes. However, Anastatica may possess this habit only in the literature, or tumble only rarely, if uprooted by accident.

== Culture ==
Since ancient times it was used as an element to guess the climate, since being a vegetable hygrometer, the wise man or shaman, predicted it with success. In dry weather the plant remains completely closed; in wet weather, it opens slowly; if it threatens rain, it opens in a very showy way and with more or less speed according to the proximity of discharge of the clouds.

== Gallery ==
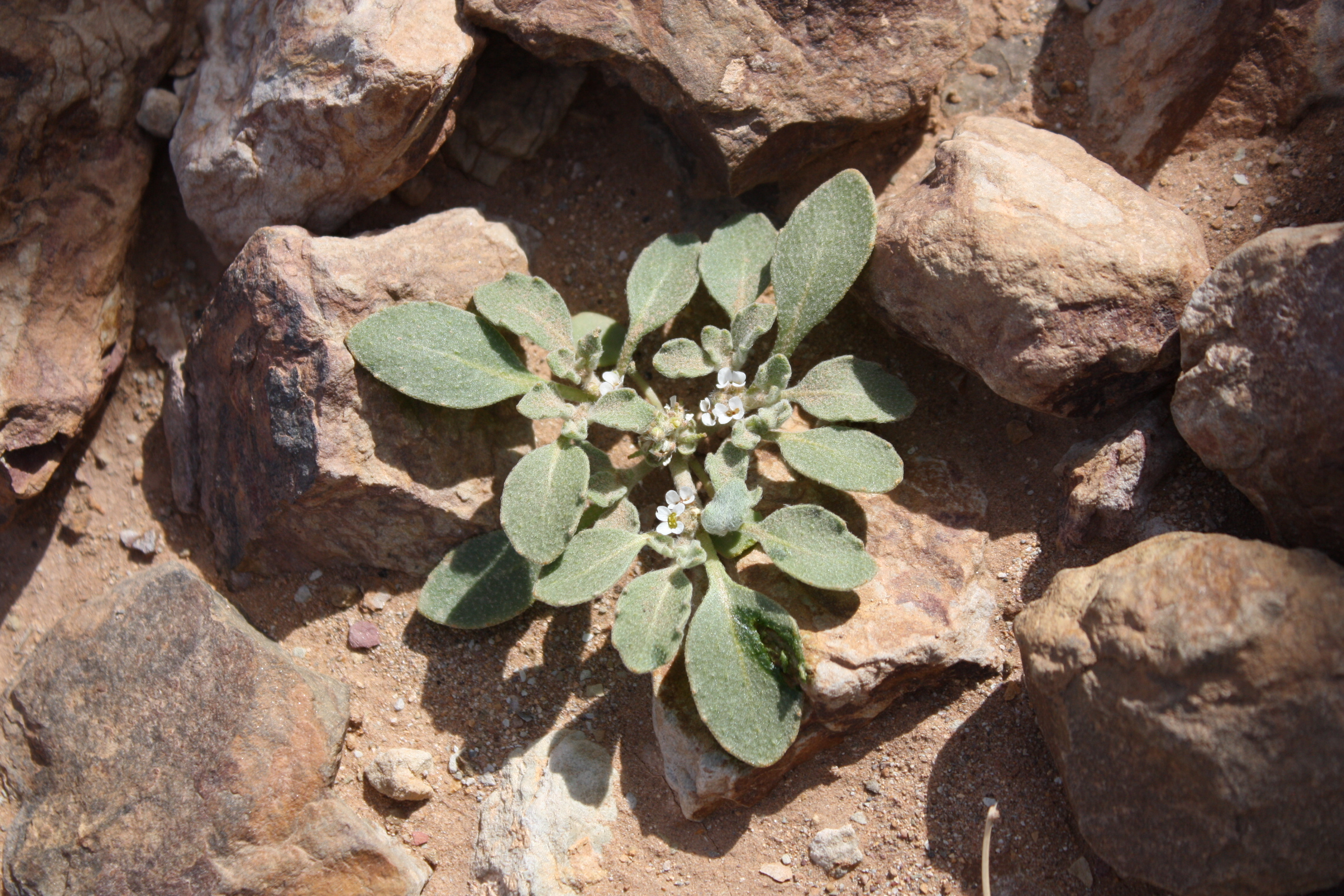
Flowers

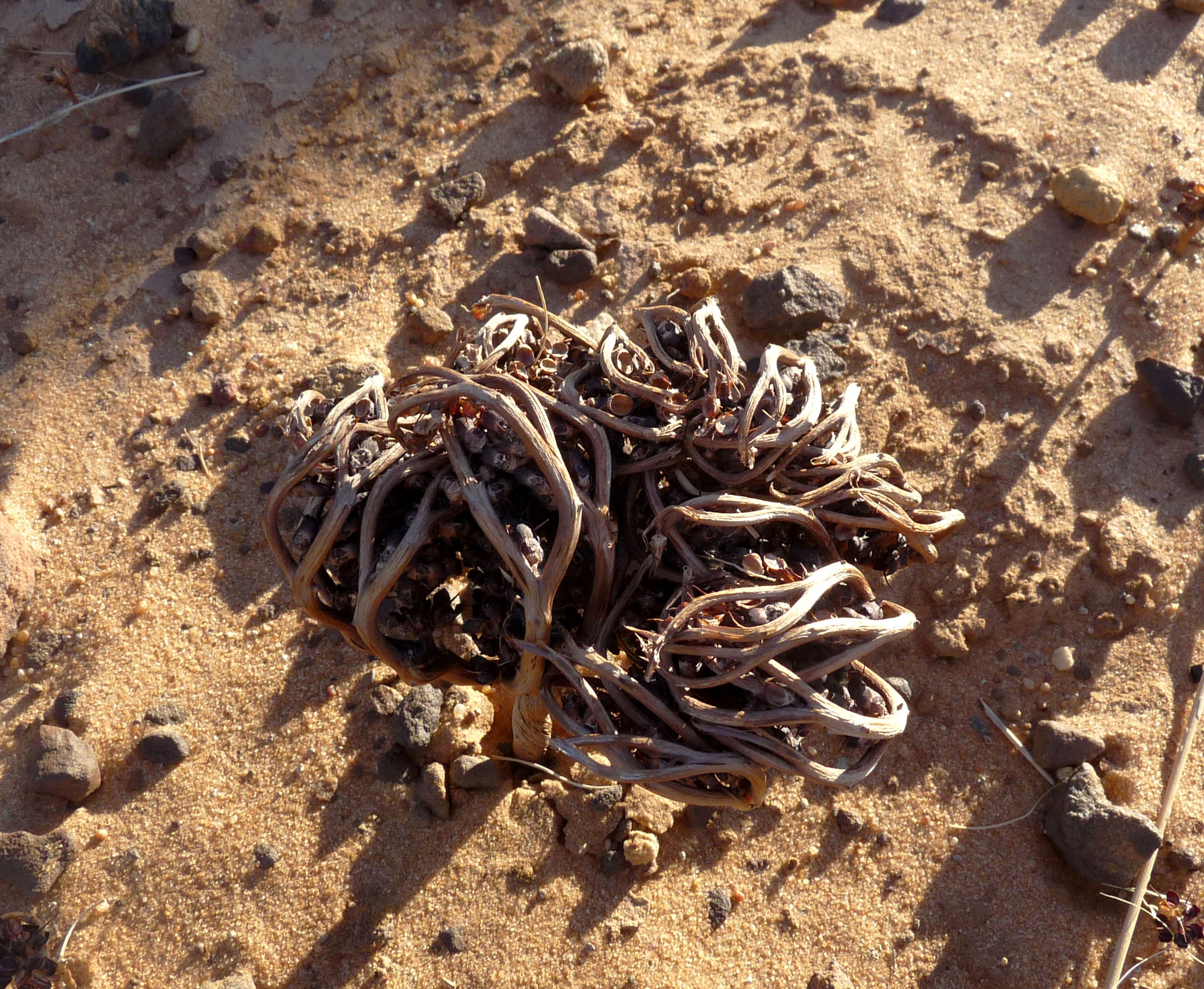
Dried up

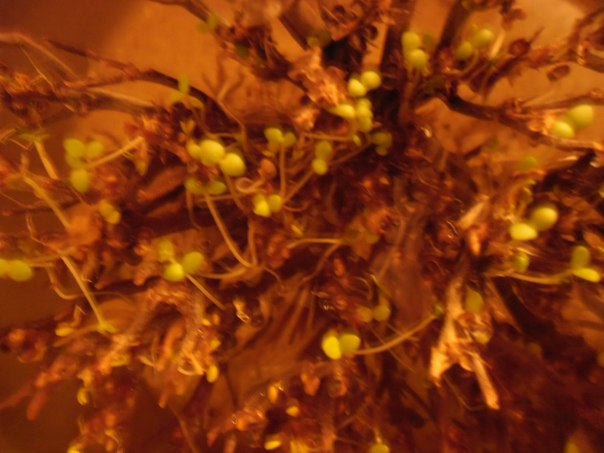
In water

== See also ==
- Pallenis hierochuntica
