= Jill Farrant =

South African botanist

Jill Farrant (born 5 December 1960 in Modimolle), professor of molecular and cell biology at the University of Cape Town, South Africa, is a leading expert on resurrection plants, which 'come back to life' from a desiccated, seemingly dead state when they are rehydrated.

== Research work ==
Farrant is investigating the ability of certain species of plants which are able to survive without water for long periods of time. As Farrant explains, "[a]ll plants have the genes that enable desiccation tolerance, but most use them only when they make seeds. Resurrection plants can also switch these genes on in their leaves and roots whenever drought occurs." The ultimate goal of her research is to find applications that will lead to the development of drought-tolerant crops to nourish populations in arid, drought-prone climates, notably in Africa, and her research may have medicinal applications as well. Farrant believes food crops which can survive long stretches without water "will become more important as climate change (increasing drought) continues to impact on agriculture."

Farrant is currently investigating the potential of turning eragrostis tef, an annual grass, into just such a crop. Eragrostis tef seeds are a high-protein staple food in Ethiopia, and it is closely related to a drought-resistant resurrection grass. According to Farrant, "[i]n the same way that humans have bred plant species together over the centuries to create oats, maize and wheat, so too can we breed desiccation-tolerant, drought-resistant crops in the Eragrostis family without having to go the genetically modified route."

== Personal life ==
Farrant became interested in resurrection plants as a child when she saw a "dead" plant 'come back to life' after a rain fall. As a 9-year-old Farrant noted in her diary in 1970, "The ded [sic] plant on the rocks was alive but Dad wouldn't believe me."

In 2009, Farrant suffered a near-fatal head injury which caused her to lose her senses of taste and smell.

== Background ==
- Undergraduate, MSc, and PhD degrees from the University of KwaZulu-Natal, Durban, South Africa.
- NRF President's Award for researchers who, on the basis of exceptional potential demonstrated in their published doctoral work, are considered likely to become future international leaders in their field.
- 2008 SAAB Silver Medal for Excellence in Botany.
- Fellow of the Royal Society of Southern Africa, the University of Cape Town and the Oppenheimer Memorial Trust Foundation.
- 2010. Department of Science and Technology award for being the most distinguished women scientist.
- President of South African Association of Botanists (2009–2010).

== Awards ==
In 2010, Farrant was awarded the €100,000 Harry Oppenheimer Fellowship Award for her research into resurrection plants. In 2012, she received the L'Oréal-UNESCO Awards For Women in Science, along with a USD $100,000 prize.
