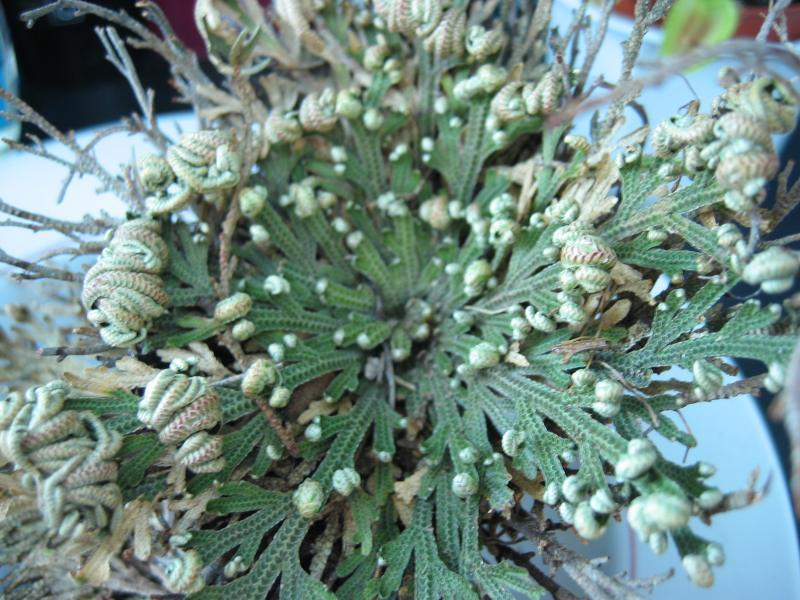

Conservation status
- Apparently Secure (NatureServe)

Scientific classification
- Kingdom: Plantae
- Clade: Embryophytes
- Clade: Tracheophytes
- Clade: Lycophytes
- Class: Lycopodiopsida
- Order: Selaginellales
- Family: Selaginellaceae
- Genus: Selaginella
- Species: S. lepidophylla

Binomial name
- Selaginella lepidophylla (Hook. & Grev.) Spring

Synonyms
- Lycopodium lepidophyllum Hooker and Greville

= Selaginella lepidophylla =

Species of spore-bearing plant

Selaginella lepidophylla (syn. Lycopodium lepidophyllum), also known as a resurrection plant and sometimes as the rose of Jericho (although distinct from the true rose of Jericho) is a species of desert plant in the spikemoss family (Selaginellaceae). It is native to the Chihuahuan Desert of the United States and Mexico. S. lepidophylla is renowned for its ability to survive almost complete desiccation. Resurrection plants are vascular rooted plants capable of surviving extreme desiccation, then resuming normal metabolic activity upon rehydration. The plant's hydro-responsive movements are governed by stem moisture content, tissue properties and a graded distribution of lignified cells affecting concentric stem stiffness and spiraling. During dry weather in its native habitat, its stems curl into a tight ball, uncurling only when exposed to moisture.

The outer stems of the plant bend into circular rings after a relatively short period without water. The inner stems instead curl slowly into spirals in response to desiccation, due to the action of the strain gradient along their length. Selaginella lepidophylla reaches a maximum height of 5 cm, and is native to the Chihuahuan Desert.

== Names ==
Common names for this plant include flower of stone, false rose of Jericho, rose of Jericho, resurrection plant, resurrection moss, dinosaur plant, siempre viva, stone flower, and doradilla.

Selaginella lepidophylla is not to be confused with Anastatica hierochuntica a flowering plant in the mustard family, Brassicaceae, known as the true Rose of Jericho. Selaginella lepidophylla is a true resurrection plant that can revive and regain metabolic function after a period of extreme desiccation. Anastatica hierochuntica is not a resurrection plant, but rather a tumbleweed also capable of repeated expansion and retraction, which superficially resembles revival.

== Description ==
Selaginella lepidophylla reviving. Duration: 3 hours

Selaginella lepidophylla is a small, fern-like plant with delicate, green stems and leaves. The plant forms a low, spreading mat, and it reproduces by spores. Selaginella lepidophylla grows in dry, sandy soils in full sun. The striking feature of Selaginella lepidophylla is its adaptation to conditions of prolonged drought in its natural environment. It deploys the physiological strategy of drying up and rolling inwards in the absence of water to form a ball, and can survive for up to several years, and lose up to 95% of its moisture content, without suffering damage.

When ground and air humidity begin to rise again, even a considerable time after it has wilted, the plant "resuscitates". If rehydrated, it continues its life cycle, fully recovering its photosynthesis and growth abilities. When desiccated, its rooted leaves become leathery at the base, appearing dark brown or light to reddish brown.

The dry ball opens a few hours after being placed in contact with water, the parched leaves gradually resuming their green colour. If the roots are not too damaged, the plant may survive in pozzolanic ash. No matter how dried or damaged it becomes, because of the particular biological structure of its leaves the plant retains the ability to imbibe water and unfold itself, even many years after its death.

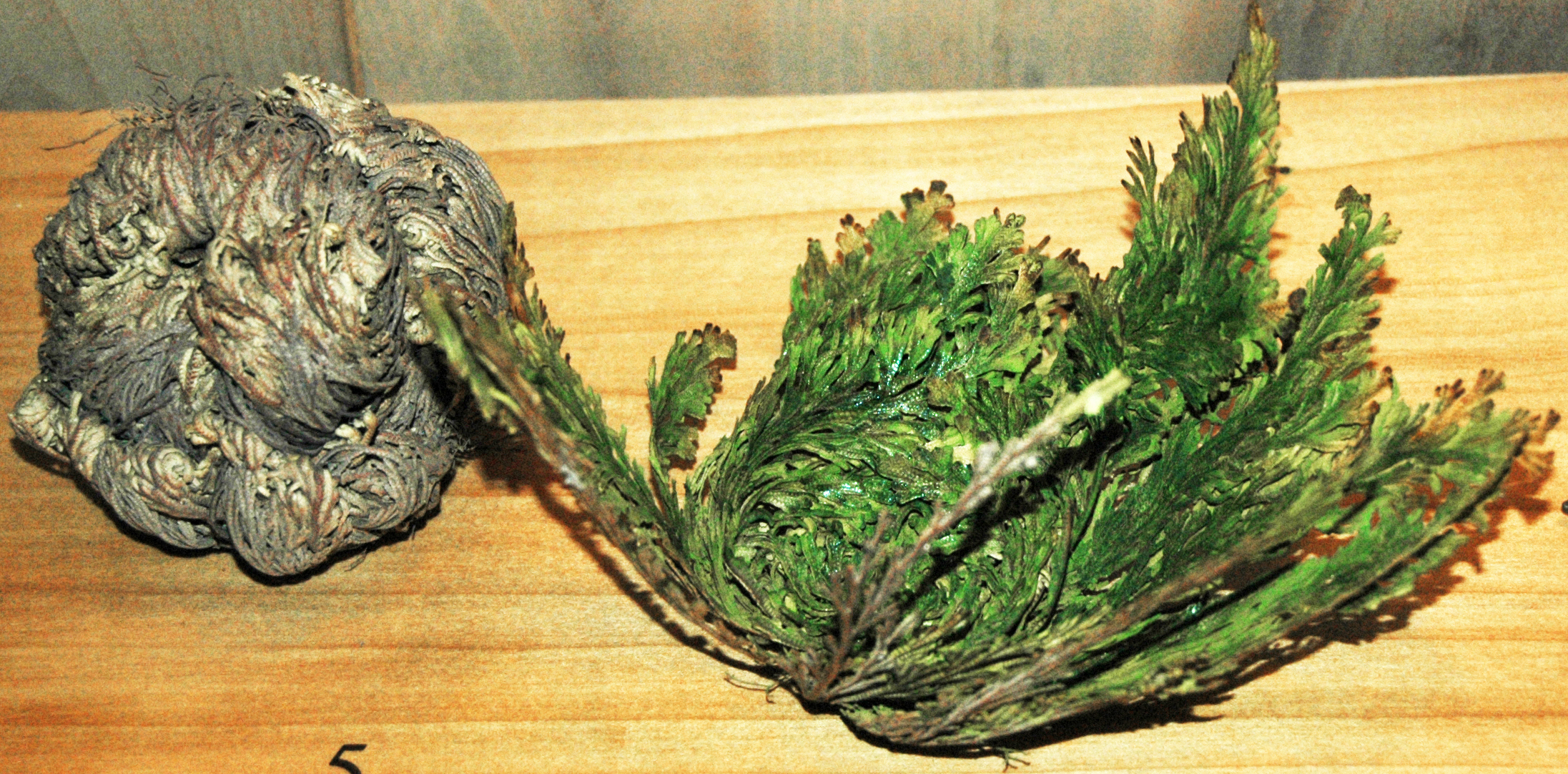
Selaginella lepidophylla in its dry and hydrated states

The plant enters a dormant state in the absence of water, avoiding tissue and cell damage during drying by synthesizing trehalose, a crystallized sugar that acts as a compatible solute. Dissolved salts become concentrated in the plant tissues as water evaporates. The trehalose produced by the plant acts in place of the evaporating water, so preventing the salts from causing damage and protecting against death due to an excess of salinity. S. lepidophylla also uses betaines, substances which have the same function as trehalose.

Once water is restored to the plant tissues, the sugar crystals dissolve and the plant's metabolism, until then paralyzed, reactivates. Leaves that seemed dead turn green, and open.

== Lifestyle ==
=== Desert conditions ===
Adapted to the desert environment, Selaginella lepidophylla can survive without water for several years, drying up until it retains only 3% of its mass. The plant can live and reproduce in arid regions for long periods of time. When living conditions become too difficult, the plant's survival mechanism allows it to dry out gradually. Its leaves turn brown and fold in, giving the plant the appearance of a ball. In dormancy, all of its metabolic functions are reduced to a minimum.

=== Prolonged drought ===
Where drought persists, the roots may detach, allowing the plant to be carried by the wind. If it encounters moisture, Selaginella lepidophylla may rehydrate and take root in the new location.

Plants that go through the resurrection process are not always able to "rise again". If dehydration has been too rapid, or in the event of irregular alternation of drought and wet conditions, the plant has insufficient time to prepare properly to resist the water stress to which it is subjected. Likewise, the ability to dry up and rehydrate may diminish, in which case, after dozens of cycles of alternate desiccation and regrowth, the plant dies.

As a sporophyte, S. lepidophylla does not produce flowers or seeds but reproduces through spores. Selaginella are neither aquatic plants nor epiphytic plants.

== Uses ==
Selaginella lepidophylla is sold as a novelty item, as bare root stock in its dry state, in which it may be revived with only a little water.

The plant's ability to survive extreme desiccation was noted by Spanish missionaries when they reached the New World, including the area that was to become the United States. The missionaries used S. lepidophylla to demonstrate to potential native converts the concept of being reborn and convince them to abandon their native religious beliefs and traditions. Because of its properties, the plant was considered a lucky charm, and was passed on in families from generation to generation.

Selaginella lepidophylla has been used as a herbal medicine. An infusion is made by steeping a tablespoon of dried material in hot water, and the resulting tea is used to treat colds and sore throat.

In Mexico, S. lepidophylla is sold as a diuretic. Women drink the water in which the plant is soaked to facilitate childbirth. The speed at which the plant blossoms in the water is interpreted as an indication of whether the delivery will be easy or difficult.

The plant is also used in the rites of voodoo and Cuban santería to invoke love and fortune. The plant is said to absorb "negative energy" when worn on the body.

== Cultivation ==
Selaginella lepidophylla can be grown from spores or cuttings. The plant requires warm temperatures, high humidity, and well-drained soil.

== Additional information ==
Selaginella lepidophylla is not listed as a threatened or endangered species. The genus name "Selaginella" is derived from the Greek words "selago" (club moss) and "anella" (little). The species name "lepidophylla" means "scaly leaves".

== Gallery ==
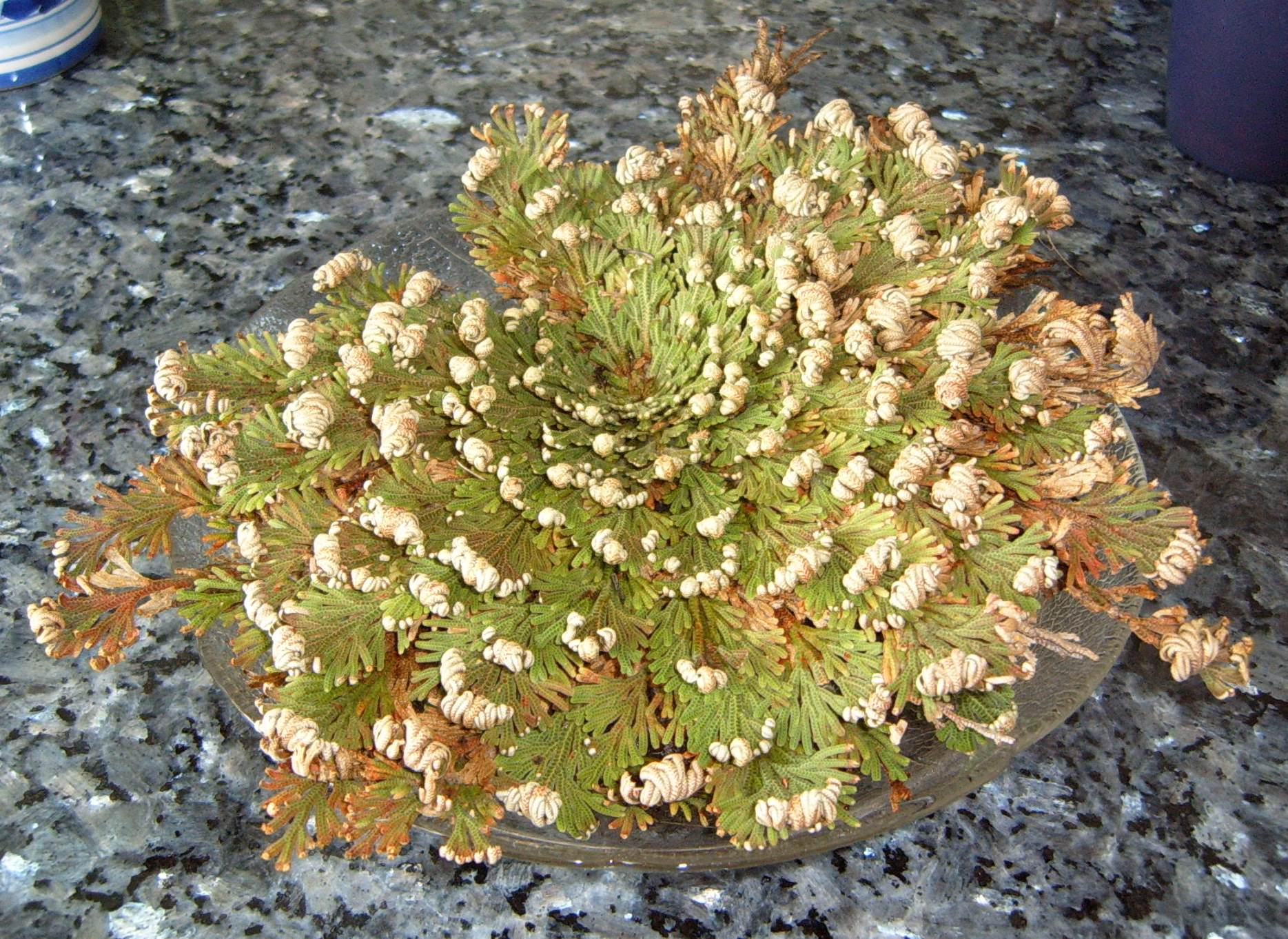
A "revived" plant

Time lapse of plant uncurling after submersion in water

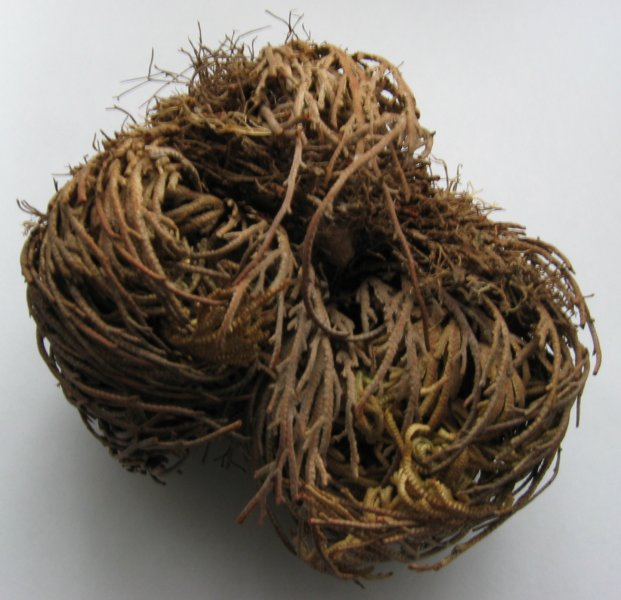
Dried and curled up
