= Dehydrin =

Family of plant proteins

Identifiers
- Symbol: Dehydrin
- Pfam: PF00257
- InterPro: IPR000167
- PROSITE: PS00315
Available protein structures:
- PDB: IPR000167 PF00257 (ECOD; PDBsum)
- AlphaFold: IPR000167; PF00257

Dehydrin (DHN) is a multi-family of proteins present in plants that is produced in response to cold and drought stress. DHNs are hydrophilic, reliably thermostable, and disordered. They are stress proteins with a high number of charged amino acids that belong to the Group II Late Embryogenesis Abundant (LEA) family. DHNs are primarily found in the cytoplasm and nucleus but more recently, they have been found in other organelles, like mitochondria and chloroplasts.

DHNs are characterized by the presence of Glycine and other polar amino acids. Many DHNs contain at least one copy of a consensus 15-amino acid sequence called the K-segment, EKKGIMDKIKEKLPG. However, an inspection of a range of other reported dehydrin sequences shows that its conservation is not absolute.

== Function ==
Dehydration-induced proteins in plants were first observed in 1989, in a comparison of barley and corn cDNA from plants under drought conditions. The protein has since been referred to as dehydrin and has been identified as the genetic basis of drought tolerance in plants.

However, the first direct genetic evidence of dehydrin playing a role in cellular protection during osmotic shock was not observed until 2005, in the moss, Physcomitrella patens. In order to show a direct correlation between DHN and stress recovery, a knockout gene was created, which interfered with DHNA's functionality. After being placed in an environment with salt and osmotic stress and then later being returned to a standard growth medium, the P. patens wildtype was able to recover to 94% of its fresh weight while the P. patens mutant only reached 39% of its fresh weight. This study also concludes that DHN production allows plants to function in high salt concentrations.

Another study found evidence of DHN's impact in drought-stress recovery by showing that transcription levels of a DHN increased in a drought-tolerant pine, Pinus pinaster, when placed in a drought treatment. However, transcription levels of a DHN decreased in the same drought treatment in a drought-sensitive P. pinaster. Drought-tolerance is a complex trait, thus that it cannot be genetically analyzed as a single gene trait. The exact mechanism of drought tolerance is yet to be determined and is still being researched. One chemical mechanism related to DHN production is the presence of the phytohormone ABA. One common response to environmental stresses is the process known as cellular dehydration. Cellular dehydration induces biosynthesis of abscisic acid (ABA), which is known to react as a stress hormone because of its accumulation in the plant under water stress conditions. ABA also participates in stress signal transduction pathways ABA has been shown to increase the production of DHN, which provides more evidence of a link between DHN and drought tolerance.

== Dehydrin-like proteins ==
There are other proteins in the cell that play a similar role in the recovery of drought treated plants. These proteins are considered dehydrin-like or dehydrin-related. They are poorly defined, in that these dehydrin-like proteins are similar to DHNs, but are unfit to be classified as DHNs for varying reasons. They are found to be similar in that they respond to some or all of the same environmental stresses that induce DHN production. In a particular study dehydrin-like proteins found in the mitochondria were upregulated in drought and cold treatments of cereals. Dehydrins have been reported to confer resistance against fungal infections and over-expression of dehydrins provide protection under abiotic and biotic stress conditions.

== See also ==
- Antifreeze protein
- C-Repeat Binding Factor
