= Late embryogenesis abundant proteins =

Late embryogenesis abundant proteins (LEA proteins) are proteins in plants, some bacteria, and invertebrates that protect against protein aggregation due to desiccation or osmotic stresses associated with low temperature. LEA proteins were initially discovered accumulating late in embryogenesis of cotton seeds. Originally noticed due to its abundance in seeds and pollens, LEA proteins have been found to protect against desiccation, cold, or high salinity in a variety of organisms, including the bacterium Deinococcus radiodurans, nematode Caenorhabditis elegans, Artemia (brine shrimp), and rotifers.

== Function ==
LEA proteins function by mechanisms which are distinct from those displayed by heat shock molecular chaperones. Although the causes of LEA protein induction have not yet been determined, conformational changes in transcription factors or integral membrane proteins due to water loss have been suggested. LEA proteins are particularly protective of mitochondrial membranes against dehydration damage.

== Types ==
LEA proteins are grouped by sequence similarity into 5 or 7 major groups, with 9 to 14 subgroups. There is also a simplistic scheme that groups by origin, i.e. plant, bacterial, and animal. The groups are:

Nomenclature of LEA families
Pfam	Battaglia	Bray	Dure	Bies-Ethève	Names
Dehydrin (PF00257)	2	2	D-11	2	Dehydrin, RAB
SMP (PF04927)	5A	6	D-34	5	PAP140
LEA_1 (PF03760)	4A	4	—N/a	4	LE25_LYCES
LEA_1 (PF03760)	4B	4	D-113	4	PAP260, PAP051
LEA_2 (PF03168)	5C	—N/a	D-95	7	LEA14, WHy domain
LEA_3 (PF03242)	5B	—N/a	D-73	6	AtD121, Sag21, lea5
LEA_4 (PF02987)	3A	3	D-7	3	ECP63, PAP240, PM27
LEA_4 (PF02987)	3B	5→3	D-29	3	D-29
LEA_5 (PF00477)	1	1	D-19	1	Em1, Em6
LEA_6 (PF10714)	6	—N/a	—N/a	8	LEA18
AWA_WDS (PF02496)	7	—N/a	—N/a	—N/a	ASR

One reason there are so many different families is that the LEA proteins were originally noticed by their common compositional and biophysical features (hydrophilic, high glycine), not by a united ancestry. There are many additional families that also share these features but they are not as common in plants. According to LEAPdb, the Pfam classification is the most comprehensive.

== Applications ==
A group 3 (LEA_4) small LEA protein can be used to protect Cryo-EM samples from air-water interface damage (preferred orientation, complex dissociation, and protein denaturation) during freezing. They physically keep the sample molecules away from the air-water interface.

== See also ==
- Cryptobiosis
- Antifreeze proteins
