= Resurrection plant =

A resurrection plant is a plant that can survive extreme dehydration of its vegetative tissues and resume normal metabolic activity upon rehydration. These plants exhibit desiccation tolerance and are often described as poikilohydric, allowing them to lose more than 90% of their cellular water while remaining viable for extended periods, sometimes months or years.

The resurrection plant Selaginella lepidophylla reviving within 3 hours after the addition of water.

Resurrection plants occur across multiple evolutionary lineages, including ferns, lycophytes, and flowering plants; this suggests convergent evolution under strong environmental selection pressures. These plants represent a rare adaptation distinct from drought tolerance. Unlike seeds or spores, which are commonly desiccation-tolerant, resurrection plants retain this ability in fully developed vegetative tissues.

== Mechanisms of desiccation tolerance ==
Desiccation tolerance is common in seeds but rare in the vegetative tissues of most land plants. Resurrection plants undergo extensive physiological and molecular changes during dehydration, including the shutdown of metabolism and photosynthesis.

Cellular structures are stabilized through the accumulation of sugars such as sucrose and raffinose, which replace water and form glass-like matrices that preserve membranes and proteins. Protective proteins, including molecular chaperones and late embryogenesis abundant (LEA) proteins, help maintain the structure of macromolecules during drying and rehydration. Antioxidant systems are also activated to mitigate damage from reactive oxygen species generated during stress.

Many resurrection plants degrade chlorophyll and dismantle the photosynthetic apparatus during dehydration to avoid photooxidative damage, rebuilding these systems after rehydration. These coordinated responses allow cells to survive in a near-complete absence of cellular water and rapidly resume function when rehydrated.

== Distribution and diversity ==
Approximately 1,300 species of resurrection plants have been identified, spanning mosses, ferns, and angiosperms. Resurrection plants are often associated with habitats characterized by intermittent water availability and rapid drying cycles. They are typically found in arid and semi-arid environments, particularly on exposed rock outcrops with shallow soils. Southern Africa is considered a global center of diversity for resurrection plants.

== Examples ==
Examples include:

- Asplenium ceterach
- Asteriscus (plant);
- Dorcoceras hygrometrica,
- Craterostigma, members of the Linderniaceae/Scrophulariaceae with snapdragon-like flowers
- Haberlea rhodopensis
- Mesembryanthemum, the plant can revive within a short period of time after a drought
- Myrothamnus flabellifolius, a plant species native to Southern Africa
- Pleopeltis polypodioides, also known as resurrection fern
- Ramonda serbica, a species in the family Gesneriaceae
- Selaginella lepidophylla, a plant species native to North America, Central and South America, and sold as a novelty
- Tillandsia
- Xerophyta, a monocotyledonous genus of 57 species typically occurring on rock outcrops in Southern African grasslands

Certain resurrection plants, particularly Selaginella lepidophylla, have long been sold in their desiccated, dormant form as curiosities, reviving when exposed to water. This practice was noted in 19th-century botanical literature and continues today.

== Potential applications ==
The mechanisms underlying desiccation tolerance in resurrection plants have attracted interest for improving drought and desiccation tolerance in crop species. Research efforts have included attempts to transfer or activate desiccation tolerance pathways in crop plants, including work led by Jill Farrant on identifying regulatory mechanisms that enable vegetative tissues to survive dehydration. Early public discussion of this approach was highlighted in a 2015 TED talk by Farrant.

== See also ==
- Dehydration
- Cryptobiosis
- Anhydrobiosis
- Hygrochasy
