= Cerbillona =

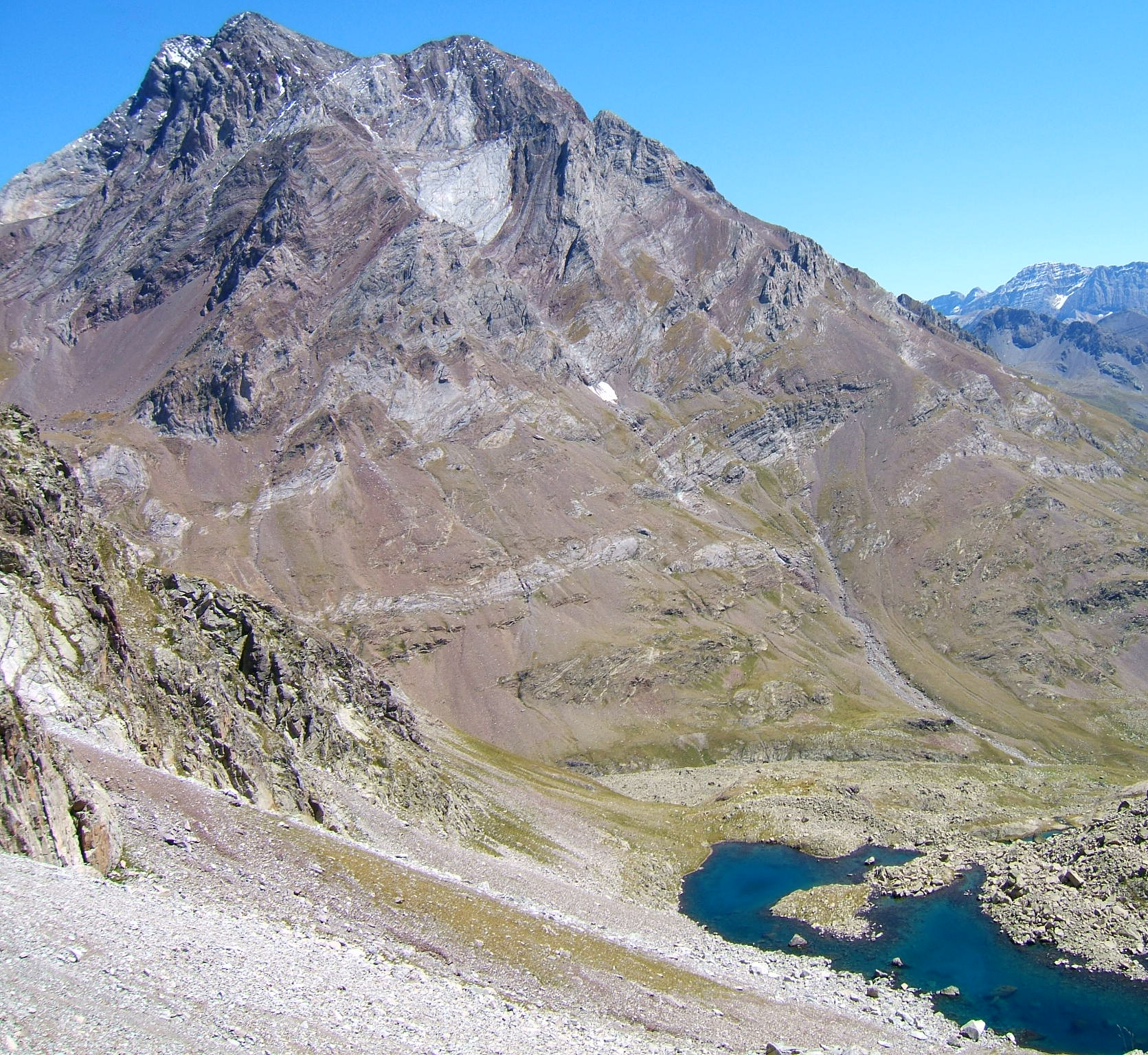
- Face Ouest du Vignemale depuis l'Ibón de los Batans : Pique Longue au fond à gauche, Pic Cerbillona au milieu

Highest point
- Elevation: 3,247 m (10,653 ft)
- Listing: List of Pyrenean three-thousanders
- Coordinates: 42°46′09″N 0°08′59″E

Geography
- Location within Pyrenees
- Location: France — Spain
- Région Communauté: Midi-Pyrénées; Aragon
- Département Province: Hautes-Pyrénées; Huesca
- Parent range: Massif du Vignemale (Pyrenees)

The Cerbillona, culminating at 3,247 m (10,653 ft) in the massif du Vignemale, constitutes the south-western high fringe of the glacier d'Ossoue with the Pic central (3,235 m) and the Clot de la Hount (3,289 m). The Montferrat (3,219 m) constitutes the southern fringe. The Pique longue (3,298 m) is the highest summit of the massif and also of the French Pyrenees.
