= List of mountains of the Pyrenees over 3000 metres =

This list contains all of the Pyrenean three-thousanders, namely the 129 mountain summits of 3,000 metres (9,843 ft) or more above sea level in the Pyrenees, a range of mountains in southwest Europe that forms a natural border between France and Spain. The Pyrenees extend for about 491 km (305 mi) from the Bay of Biscay (Cap Higuer) to the Mediterranean Sea (Cap de Creus). The highest mountain in the Pyrenees is Aneto in Spain at 3,404 metres (11,168 ft).

The summits meeting the 3,000-metre criterion were defined by a UIAA-sponsored joint Franco-Spanish team led by Juan Buyse. The UIAA list, published in 1990, also contains 83 secondary summits in addition to the 129 principal ones listed here, and divides the range into 11 zones. According to the latest surveys, three of the peaks in the original list are actually below 3000m but are still included below.

The selection criteria used here are quite broad – many of the peaks included are secondary summits of major mountains. Using prominence as a criterion, only one summit is an ultra-prominent peak, Aneto, a further three have a prominence of 1000m (Pico Posets, Pica d'Estats, Vignemale), and five more have a prominence of over 600m. Only 17 in total have a prominence of more than 300m, commonly used as a criterion for determining an independent mountain, and are indicated in bold in the table below. 28 more have a prominence of over 100m and can be considered significant summits.

All the peaks in this list are in Spain (59 peaks) or France (26 peaks), or delimit the border between the two countries (45). The two highest major mountains and their subsidiary summits (Aneto and Posets - Zone 7 and 9) are entirely in Spain, together with the Besiberri peaks (zone 10) while Pic Long and surrounding mountains (zone 5) are entirely in France. Most of the other mountains lie on or close to the border. The small country of Andorra is located in the eastern portion of the Pyrenees and is surrounded by Spain and France; its highest mountain – Coma Pedrosa at 2,942 metres (9,652 ft) – falls below the 3,000-metre threshold. The mountains are listed by height within each of the 11 zones.

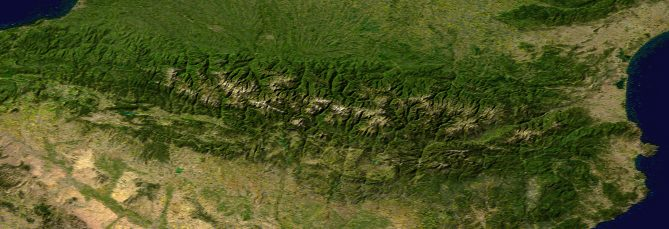
Composite satellite image of the Pyrenees (NASA)

== Table (incomplete) of Pyrenean 3000m summits ==
For the complete list see: Pyrenees#Highest summits

=== Zones ===
Zone	Name
1	Balaïtous-Enfer-Argualas
2	Vignemale
3	Monte Perdido
4	La Munia
5	Néouvielle-Pic Long
6	Batoua-Batchimale
7	Posets-Eristé
8	Clarabide-Perdiguero-Boum
9	Maladeta - Aneto
10	Besiberris
11	Estats-Montcalm

=== Table ===
Zone	Summit	Height	Prominence (m)	Country
1	**Balaïtous**	3,144 metres (10,315 ft)	849	F/S
1	**Picos del Infierno Central**	3,083 metres (10,115 ft)	532	S
1	Picos del Infierno Oriental	3,076 metres (10,092 ft)	23	S
1	Picos del Infierno Occidental	3,073 metres (10,082 ft)	14	S
1	Frondella NE	3,071 metres (10,075 ft)	122	S
1	Garmo Negro	3,051 metres (10,010 ft)	252	S
1	Argualas	3,046 metres (9,993 ft)	104	S
1	Algas	3,036 metres (9,961 ft)	28	S
1	Arnales	3,006 metres (9,862 ft)	28	S
1	Grande Fache	3,005 metres (9,859 ft)	271	F/S
1	Frondella SW	3,001 metres (9,846 ft)	10	S
2	**Vignemale (Pique Longue)**	3,298 metres (10,820 ft)	1027	F/S
2	Clot de la Hount	3,289 metres (10,791 ft)	39	F/S
2	Cerbillona	3,247 metres (10,653 ft)	52	F/S
2	Pic Central	3,235 metres (10,614 ft)	35	F/S
2	Pic de Montferrat	3,219 metres (10,561 ft)	37	F/S
2	Pointe Chausenque	3,204 metres (10,512 ft)	52	F
2	Piton Carré	3,197 metres (10,489 ft)	37	F
2	Grand Tapou	3,150 metres (10,330 ft)	44	F/S
2	Pic du Milieu	3,130 metres (10,270 ft)	16	F/S
2	Petit Vignemale	3,032 metres (9,948 ft)	42	F
3	**Monte Perdido**	3,355 metres (11,007 ft)	970	S
3	Cilindro de Marboré	3,328 metres (10,919 ft)	251	S
3	Soum de Ramond (Pic d'Anisclo)	3,258 metres (10,689 ft)	97	S
3	Pic du Marboré	3,248 metres (10,656 ft)	60	F/S
3	Pic de la Cascade Oriental	3,161 metres (10,371 ft)	23	F/S
3	**Pic du Taillon**	3,144 metres (10,315 ft)	342	F/S
3	Pic de la cascade central or Pic Brulle	3,106 metres (10,190 ft)	20	F/S
3	Pic de la Cascade Occidental	3,095 metres (10,154 ft)	69	F/S
3	Épaule du Marboré	3,073 metres (10,082 ft)	15	F/S
3	Astazou Oriental or Grand Astazou	3,071 metres (10,075 ft)	118	F/S
3	Mallo Tormosa (Baudrimont NW )	3,045 metres (9,990 ft)	57	S
3	Gabietou Occidental	3,034 metres (9,954 ft)	96	S
3	Gabietou Oriental	3,031 metres (9,944 ft)	29	F/S
3	Baudrimont SE	3,026 metres (9,928 ft)	54	S
3	Astazou occidental or Petit Astazou	3,012 metres (9,882 ft)	46	F/S
3	Tour du Marboré	3,009 metres (9,872 ft)	64	F/S
3	Casque du Marboré	3,006 metres (9,862 ft)	117	F/S
3	Punta de las Olas	3,002 metres (9,849 ft)	57	S
4	**Pic de la Munia**	3,133 metres (10,279 ft)	514	F/S
4	Pic de Serre Mourene	3,090 metres (10,140 ft)	62	F/S
4	Pic de Troumouse	3,085 metres (10,121 ft)	40	F/S
4	Pic Heid	3,022 metres (9,915 ft)	50	F
4	Pica de la Robiñera	3,003 metres (9,852 ft)	181	S
5	**Pic Long**	3,192 metres (10,472 ft)	726	F
5	Pic Campbieil	3,173 metres (10,410 ft)	271	F
5	Pic Badet	3,160 metres (10,370 ft)	61	F
5	**Pic de Néouvielle**	3,091 metres (10,141 ft)	487	F
5	Pic Maou	3,074 metres (10,085 ft)	25	F
5	Pic Maubic	3,058 metres (10,033 ft)	10	F
5	Pic des Trois Conseillers	3,039 metres (9,970 ft)	113	F
5	Turon de Néouvielle	3,035 metres (9,957 ft)	37	F
5	Pic de Bugarret	3,031 metres (9,944 ft)	48	F
5	Pale Crabounouse	3,021 metres (9,911 ft)	20	F
5	Dent d’Estibere	3,017 metres (9,898 ft)	34	F
5	Pic Ramougn	3,011 metres (9,879 ft)	46	F
5	Pics d'Estaragne	3,006 metres (9,862 ft)	84	F
6	**Pic Schrader**	3,177 metres (10,423 ft)	558	S
6	Punta del Sabre	3,136 metres (10,289 ft)	12	S
6	Pointe Ledormeur	3,120 metres (10,240 ft)	15	F/S
6	Pic Marcos Feliu	3,057 metres (10,030 ft)	22	F/S
6	**Punta Batoua (or Culfreda)** (SW summit)	3,034 metres (9,954 ft)	583	F/S
6	Pic de l'Abeille	3,029 metres (9,938 ft)	29	F/S
6	Pic de la Pez	3,024 metres (9,921 ft)	66	F/S
6	Pic de Lustou	3,023 metres (9,918 ft)	264	F
6	Pic du Port de la Pez	3,018 metres (9,902 ft)	13	F/S
7	**Pico Posets**	3,375 metres (11,073 ft)	1125	S
7	Pico Espadas	3,332 metres (10,932 ft)	77	S
7	Pic des Bessons Ravier	3,160 metres (10,370 ft)	31	S
7	Pic dels Veteranos	3,125 metres (10,253 ft)	39	S
7	Pic de Pavots	3,121 metres (10,240 ft)	34	S
7	Diente de Llardana	3,085 metres (10,121 ft)	75	S
7	Pic de Bardamina	3,079 metres (10,102 ft)	49	S
7	Pic de la Paul	3,078 metres (10,098 ft)	38	S
7	Grand Eriste	3,056 metres (10,026 ft)	225	S
7	Eriste S	3,045 metres (9,990 ft)	46	S
7	Pic Beraldi (Eriste N)	3,025 metres (9,925 ft)	41	S
7	Forgueta (Turets NW)	3,007 metres (9,865 ft)	144	S
8	**Perdiguero**	3,222 metres (10,571 ft)	649	F/S
8	Punta de Lliterola	3,132 metres (10,276 ft)	83	F/S
8	Pic des Gourgs Blancs	3,129 metres (10,266 ft)	220	F/S
8	Pic Royo	3,121 metres (10,240 ft)	20	F/S
8	Crabioules Oriental	3,116 metres (10,223 ft)	126	F/S
8	Seil Dera Baquo	3,110 metres (10,200 ft)	119	F/S
8	Pic de Maupas	3,109 metres (10,200 ft)	112	F/S
8	Pic Lezat	3,107 metres (10,194 ft)	144	F
8	Crabioules Occidental	3,106 metres (10,190 ft)	16	F/S
8	Pic Jean Arlaud (Tuca de O)	3,065 metres (10,056 ft)	38	F/S
8	Pic des Spijeoles	3,065 metres (10,056 ft)	188	F
8	Grand Quayrat	3,060 metres (10,040 ft)	155	F
8	Pic du Portillon d’Oô	3,050 metres (10,010 ft)	73	F/S
8	Pic Camboue	3,043 metres (9,984 ft)	10	F
8	Pic Gourdon	3,034 metres (9,954 ft)	118	F
8	Pic de Clarabide	3,020 metres (9,910 ft)	92	F/S
8	Pic de Gias	3,011 metres (9,879 ft)	47	S
8	Pic Belloc	3,008 metres (9,869 ft)	38	F
8	Pic de Boum	3,006 metres (9,862 ft)	111	F/S
8	Pic de Saint Saud	3,003 metres (9,852 ft)	20	F
9	**Aneto**	3,404 metres (11,168 ft)	2812	S
9	Punta de Astorg	3,355 metres (11,007 ft)	153	S
9	Pic Maldito	3,350 metres (10,990 ft)	20	S
9	Epaule de l’Aneto	3,350 metres (10,990 ft)	14	S
9	Pico del Medio	3,346 metres (10,978 ft)	13	S
9	La Maladeta	3,308 metres (10,853 ft)	107	S
9	Pico de Coronas	3,293 metres (10,804 ft)	30	S
9	Pico Tempestades	3,290 metres (10,790 ft)	98	S
9	1st Pic Occidental Maladeta	3,254 metres (10,676 ft)	11	S
9	Pic Margalida	3,241 metres (10,633 ft)	41	S
9	2nd Pic Occidental Maladeta	3,220 metres (10,560 ft)	36	S
9	Pic Russell	3,205 metres (10,515 ft)	50	S
9	3rd Pic Occidental Maladeta	3,185 metres (10,449 ft)	40	S
9	Pic le Bondidier	3,185 metres (10,449 ft)	25	S
9	Diente de Alba	3,136 metres (10,289 ft)	29	S
9	Pico de Alba	3,118 metres (10,230 ft)	67	S
9	**Pic de Vallibierna**	3,067 metres (10,062 ft)	330	S
9	Tuca de Culebras	3,062 metres (10,046 ft)	15	S
9	Pic Aragüells	3,037 metres (9,964 ft)	134	S
9	Tuc de Mulleres	3,010 metres (9,880 ft)	203	S
10	**Comaloforno**	3,029 metres (9,938 ft)	742	S
10	Besiberri Sud	3,023 metres (9,918 ft)	36	S
10	Besiberri Nord	3,008 metres (9,869 ft)	100	S
10	**Punta Alta de Comalesbienes or Punta Alta**	3,014 metres (9,888 ft)	541	S
10	Pic Celestin Passet	2,998 metres (9,836 ft)	58	S
10	Besiberri del Mig S	2,996 metres (9,829 ft)	66	S
10	Besiberri del Mig N	2,995 metres (9,826 ft)	10	S
11	**Pic d'Estats**	3,143 metres (10,312 ft)	1290	F/S
11	Pic Verdaguer	3,129 metres (10,266 ft)	21	F/S
11	Punta Gabarró	3,115 metres (10,220 ft)	25	F/S
11	Pic du Sotllo	3,073 metres (10,082 ft)	198	F/S
11	Pic de Montcalm	3,078 metres (10,098 ft)	96	F

== See also ==
- Three-thousanders
- List of mountains in Aragon
- List of mountains in Catalonia
- Peak bagging

== Bibliography ==
- Milne, Tony (2015). 10 Manuels and a Manolete. Handmaid Books, Herblay.
