= Olivier Lebas =

French military officer (1964–2026)

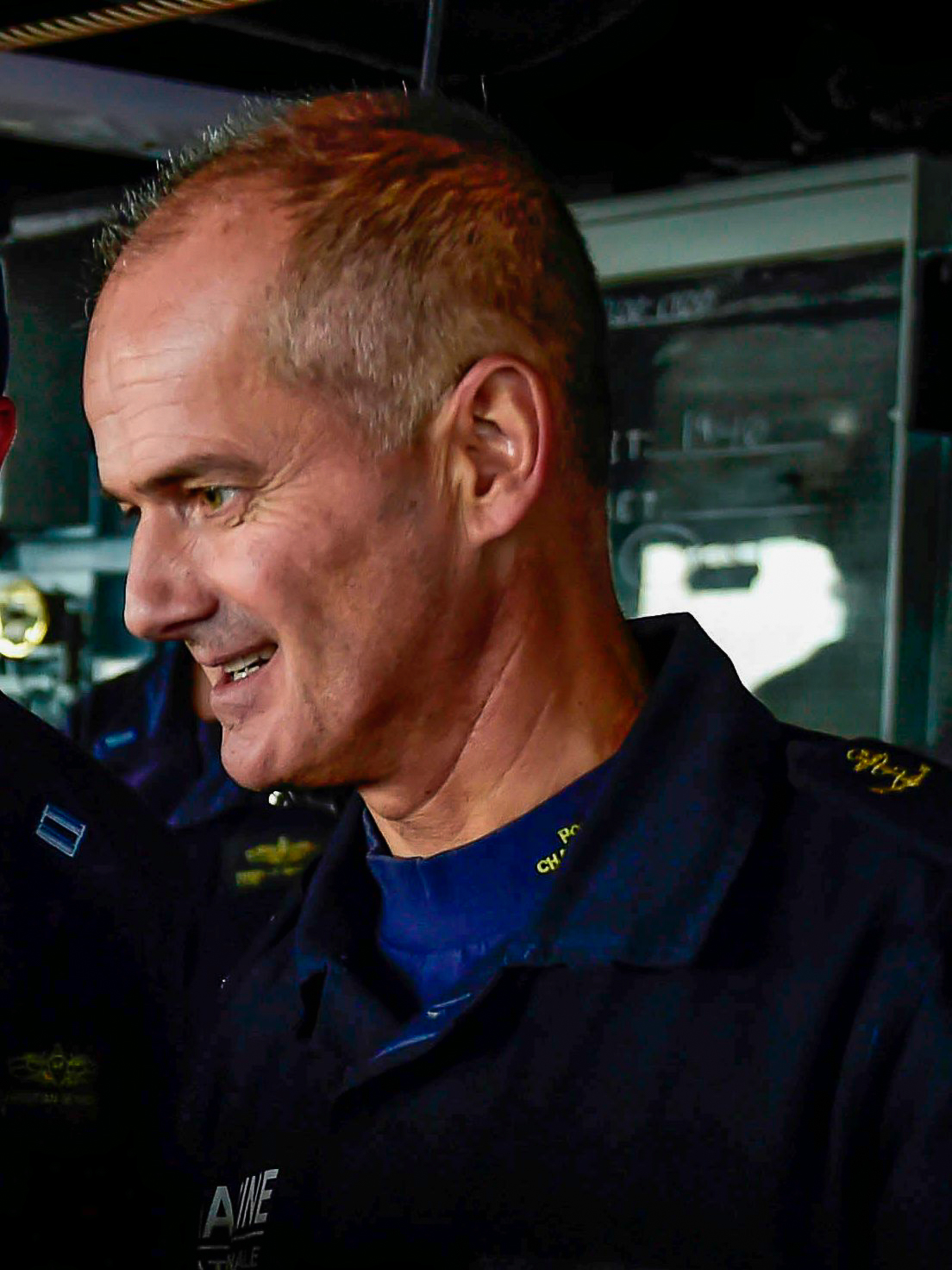
- Lebas in 2016
- Born: Olivier Bernard Eugène Lebas; 24 June 1964; Boulogne-sur-Mer, France
- Died: 12 August 2026 (aged 62); Pic des Spijeoles, France
- Education: Institut catholique d'arts et métiers Collège interarmées de Défense
- Occupation: Military officer

Olivier Bernard Eugène Lebas (French: [olivjˈe bɛʁnˈaʁ øʒˈɛn ləbˈa]; 24 June 1964 – 12 August 2026) was a French military officer who served as a Vice-Admiral in the Navy.

== Biography ==
Born in Boulogne-sur-Mer on 24 June 1964, Lebas spent his youth in Marquise. He earned an engineering degree from the Institut catholique d'arts et métiers and joined the French Navy in 1987. He served foreign tours of duty in Afghanistan, Iraq, Libya and Kosovo and notably landed a heavily-damaged fighter jet onto the aircraft carrier Foch. He also served aboard the Clemenceau. He entered the Collège interarmées de Défense in 2003. From 2007 to 2008, he served as commander of the frigate Aconit. From 2011 to 2013, he held command over the aircraft carrier Charles de Gaulle. As a rear admiral, he commanded the Charles de Gaulle during Opération Chammal from 2016 to 2019. After he was named Vice-Admiral, he commanded zones in North Africa and the Baltic Sea. In 2023, he left the service and became a defense advisor for Airbus.

Lebas died from a fall while climbing the Pic des Spijeoles, on 19 August 2026, at the age of 62.
