= Serre Mourene =

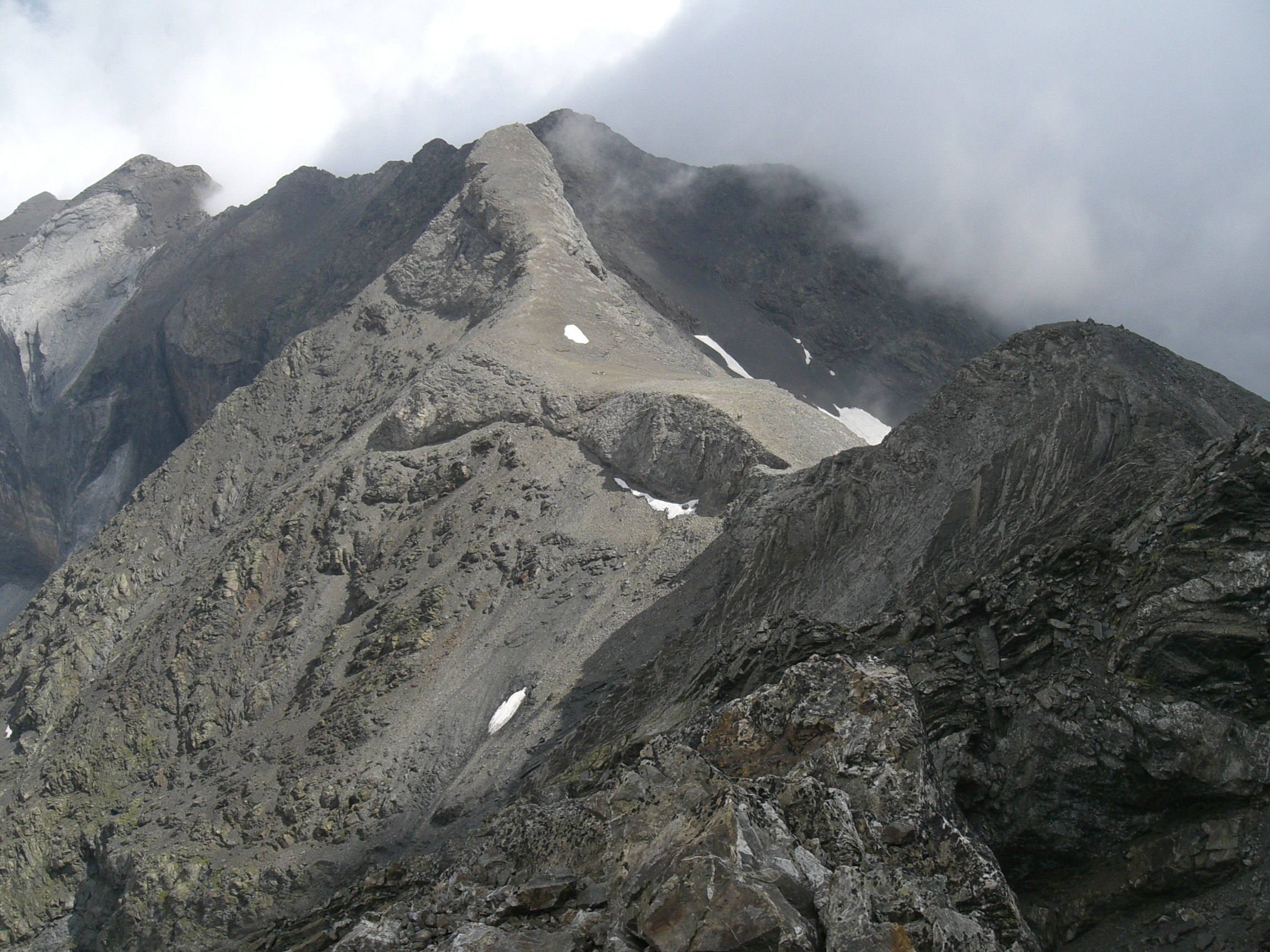
- Pic de Serre Mourène depuis le pic de la Munia

Highest point
- Elevation: 3,090 m (10,140 ft)
- Coordinates: 42°43′16″N 0°08′07″E

Geography
- Countries: France and Spain
- Région Community: Midi-Pyrénées and Aragon
- Département Province: Hautes-Pyrénées and Huesca
- Parent range: Pyrénées

The Serre Mourene is a pyrenean summit, located on the Franco-Spanish border between the cirques of Troumouse and Barrosa, culminating at 3,090 m (10,140 ft); it is the second highest summit of the massif de la Munia after the pic de la Munia.

== Topography ==
The summit is located on the pyrenean watershed in the central Pyrenees between the summits of la Munia and Troumouse.

== See also ==
- List of Pyrenean three-thousanders
