= Pic de Madrès =

Mountain in the French Pyrenees

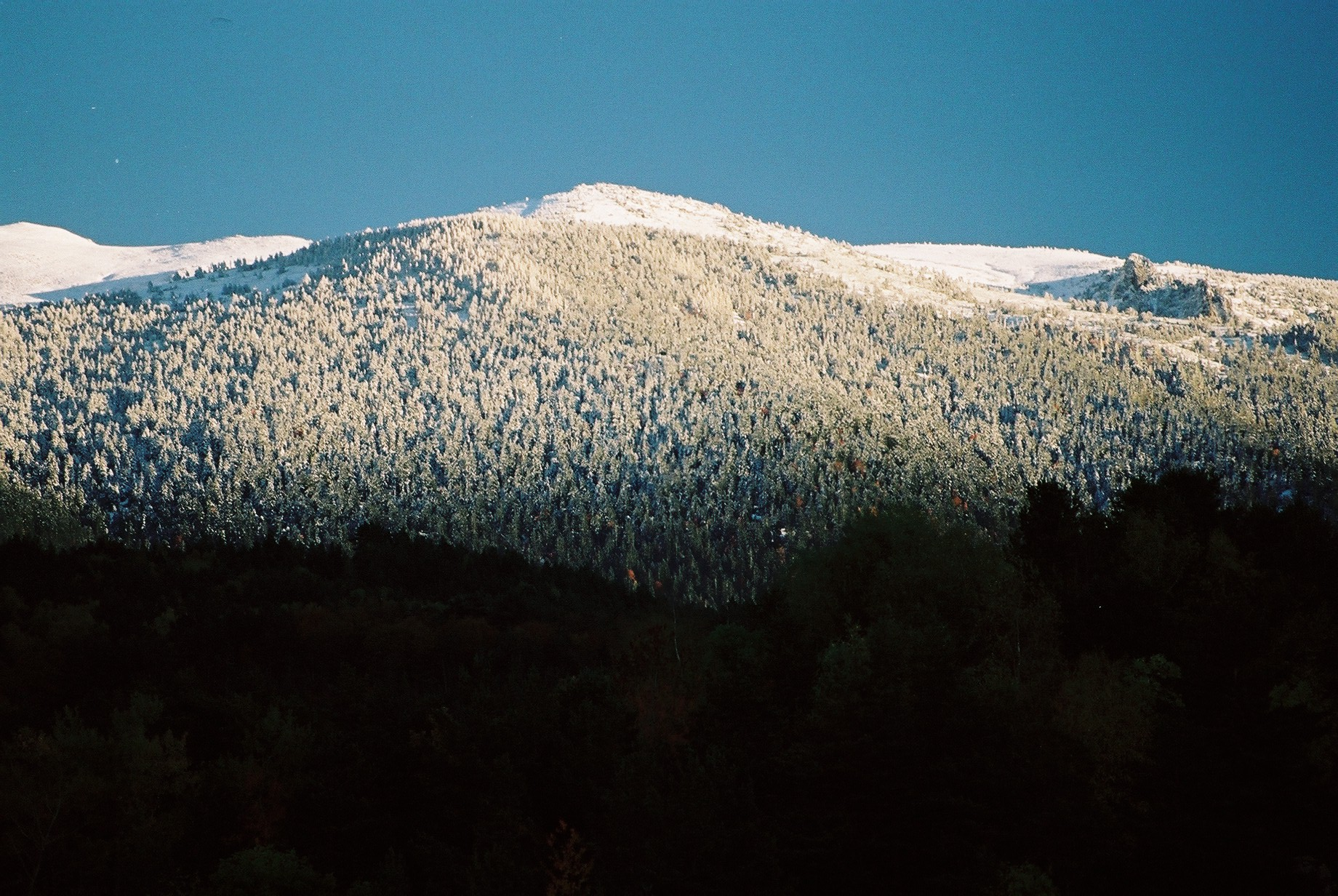

Highest point
- Elevation: 2,469 m (8,100 ft)
- Prominence: 755 m (2,477 ft)
- Coordinates: 42°39′6″N 2°11′33″E

Geography
- Location within Pyrenees
- Location: Aude, Languedoc-Roussillon, France
- Parent range: Pyrenees

Pic de Madrès (Occitan: Pica de Maïres) is a peak in the French Pyrenees, in the Aude department, Languedoc-Roussillon. It has an elevation of 2,469 m.
