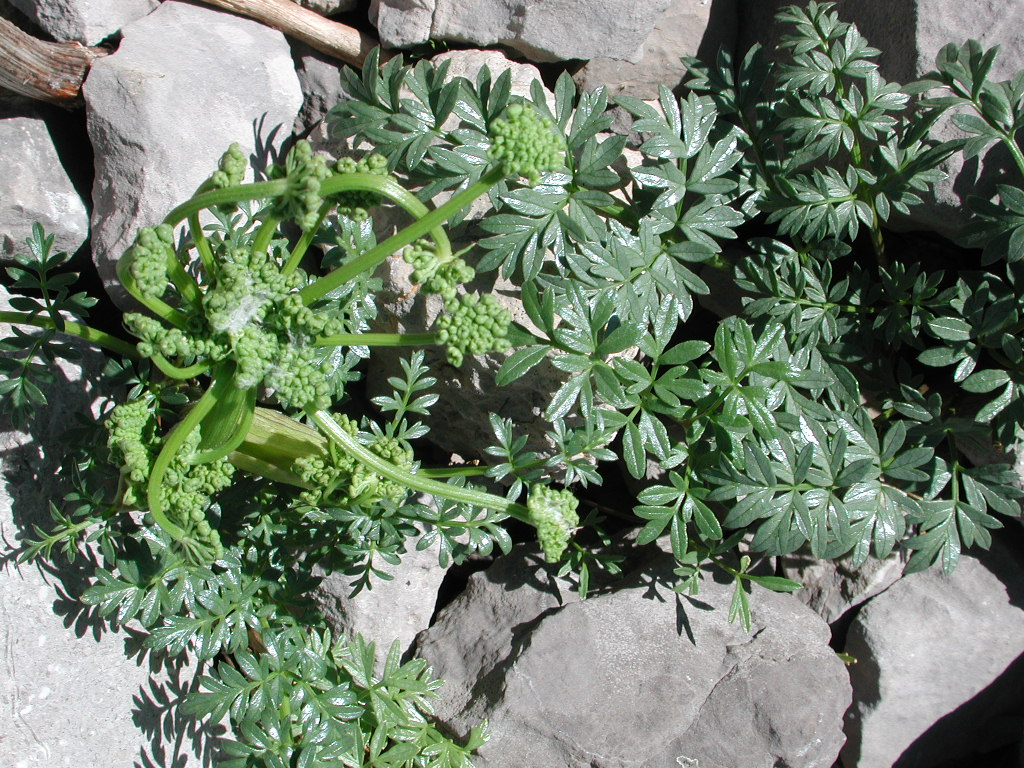
- Xatardia scabra

Scientific classification
- Kingdom: Plantae
- Clade: Tracheophytes
- Clade: Angiosperms
- Clade: Eudicots
- Clade: Asterids
- Order: Apiales
- Family: Apiaceae
- Genus: Xatardia; Meisn.
- Species: X. scabra

Binomial name
- Xatardia scabra (Lapeyr.) Meisn.

Synonyms
- Angelica scabra Petit; Petitia scabra (Lapeyr.) J.Gay; Selinum scabrum Lapeyr.

= Xatardia =

Species of flowering plant

Xatardia is a monotypic genus of flowering plants belonging to the family Apiaceae. It only contains one known species, Xatardia scabra.

It is native to the eastern part of the Pyrenees between France and Spain.

The genus name of Xatardia is in honour of Barthélemy Joseph Paul Xatard (1774–1846), a French apothecary and botanist who collected in the eastern Pyrenees. The Latin specific epithet of scabra means rough or rough to the touch, as derived from scabrid and the feminine form scabra. Both the genus and the species were first described and published in Pl. Vasc. Gen. Vol.1 on page 145 in 1838.
