= Turon de Néouvielle =

Summit in the French Pyrenees

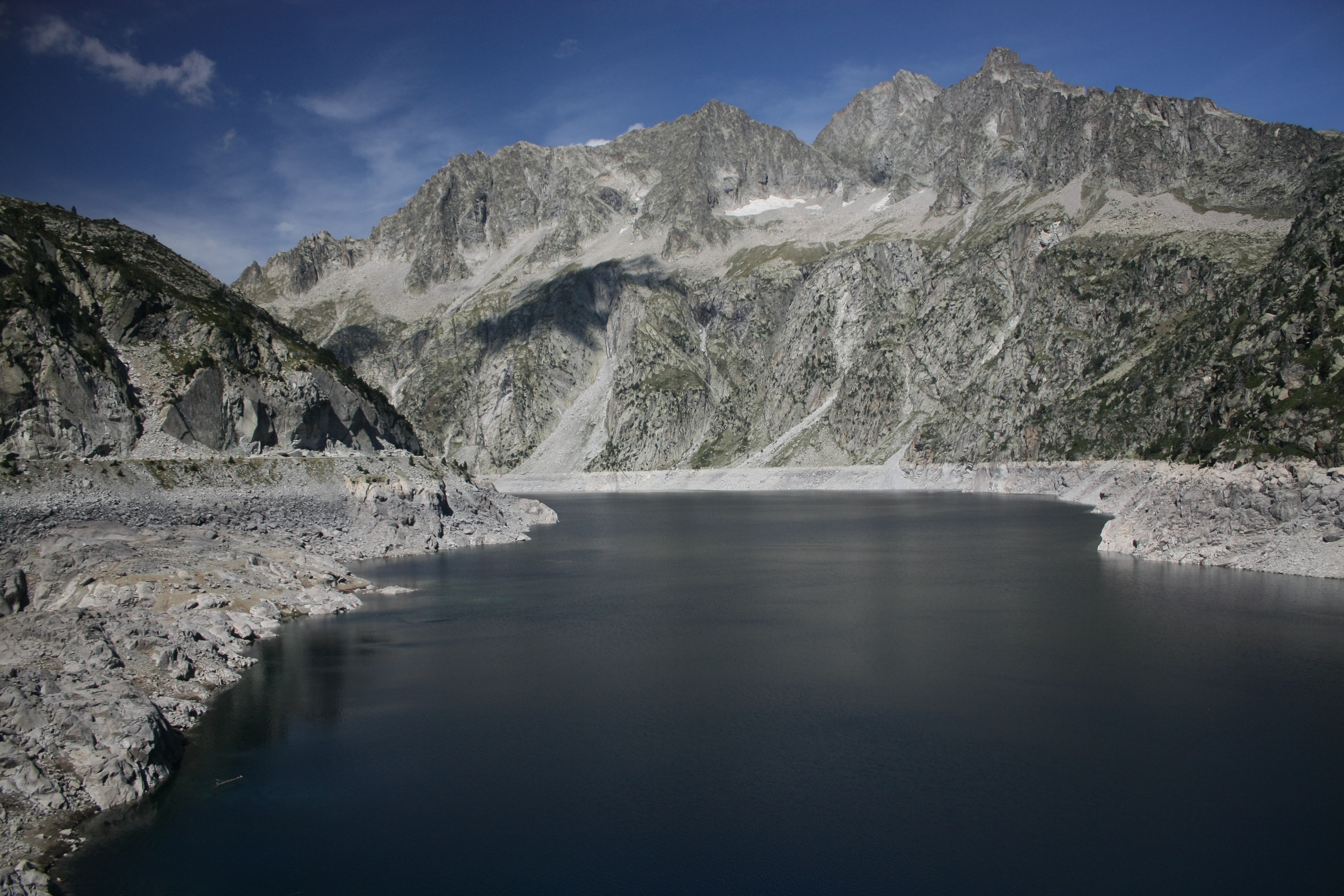
- (Image with notes)

Highest point
- Elevation: 3,035 m (9,957 ft)
- Coordinates: 42°49′41″N 0°06′27″E

Geography
- Location within Pyrenees
- Location: Hautes-Pyrénées, France
- Parent range: Néouvielle Massif

Climbing
- First ascent: 15 August 1787 Jean-Joseph Vidal and Henri Reboul

The Turon du Néouvielle is a summit in the French Pyrenees, culminating at 3,035 m, located in the Néouvielle Range, on the edge of the Pyrenees National Park. It is famous for having the first recorded ascent of a Pyrenees peak over 3,000 metres.

== History ==
In 1787, on the second of August, Jean-Joseph Vidal, an astronomer from Mirepoix, and the chemist Henri Reboul from Toulouse, who was studying the snowmass in the Pyrenees, made the first recorded ascent. They gave their names to the rocky ridge which extends from the crest of Turon towards Cap-de-Long Lake.

== Access ==
The peak is easily accessible from Barèges, going past the alpine "hut" of Refuge de la Glère, by Lake Glère.

== See also ==
- List of Pyrenean three-thousanders
