= Pic des Spijeoles =

Mountain in France

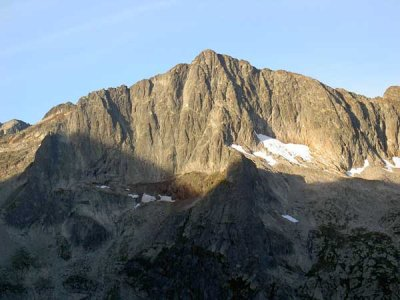
- View of Spijeoles from the Grand Quayrat

Highest point
- Elevation: 3,065 m (10,056 ft)
- Coordinates: 42°42′39″N 0°29′05″E

Geography
- Location within Pyrenees
- Location: Midi-Pyrénées, France
- Départements: Hautes-Pyrénées, Haute-Garonne
- Parent range: Pyrénées

Climbing
- First ascent: 30 by Henry Russell and Firmin Barrau
- Easiest route: From granges d'Astau via refuge d'Espingo

The Pic des Spijeoles is a French pyrenean summit, culminating at 3,065 m (10,056 ft).

== Toponymy ==
The name comes from gascon eths picholes (pronounced es pitcholes), meaning « smalls rills » ("spijeole" is an erroneous derivation).

== Geography ==
It lies in the High Luchonnais near the spa town of Bagnères-de-Luchon, on the border of the hautes-Pyrénées and Haute-Garonne departments.

== History ==
The first ascent by normal route was made by Henry Russell and guide from Luchon Firmin Barrau on June 30, 1880.

On September 6, 1906, luchonese pyreneist Marcel fell victim of a fatal fall at la brèche "gap" des Spijeoles.

== Access ==
The Spijeoles ascension from the barns of Astau and the refuge d'Espingo (normal route) is quite long though without any real difficulty (aside from in foggy conditions). Even in Summer and in good weather conditions, it is reserved for skilled hikers. It offers a superb panorama on the central Pyrenees and la vallée de Luchon. The 2000 m climb often requires a sleep at le refuge d'Espingo.

== See also ==
- List of Pyrenean three-thousanders
