= Pic de Maupas =

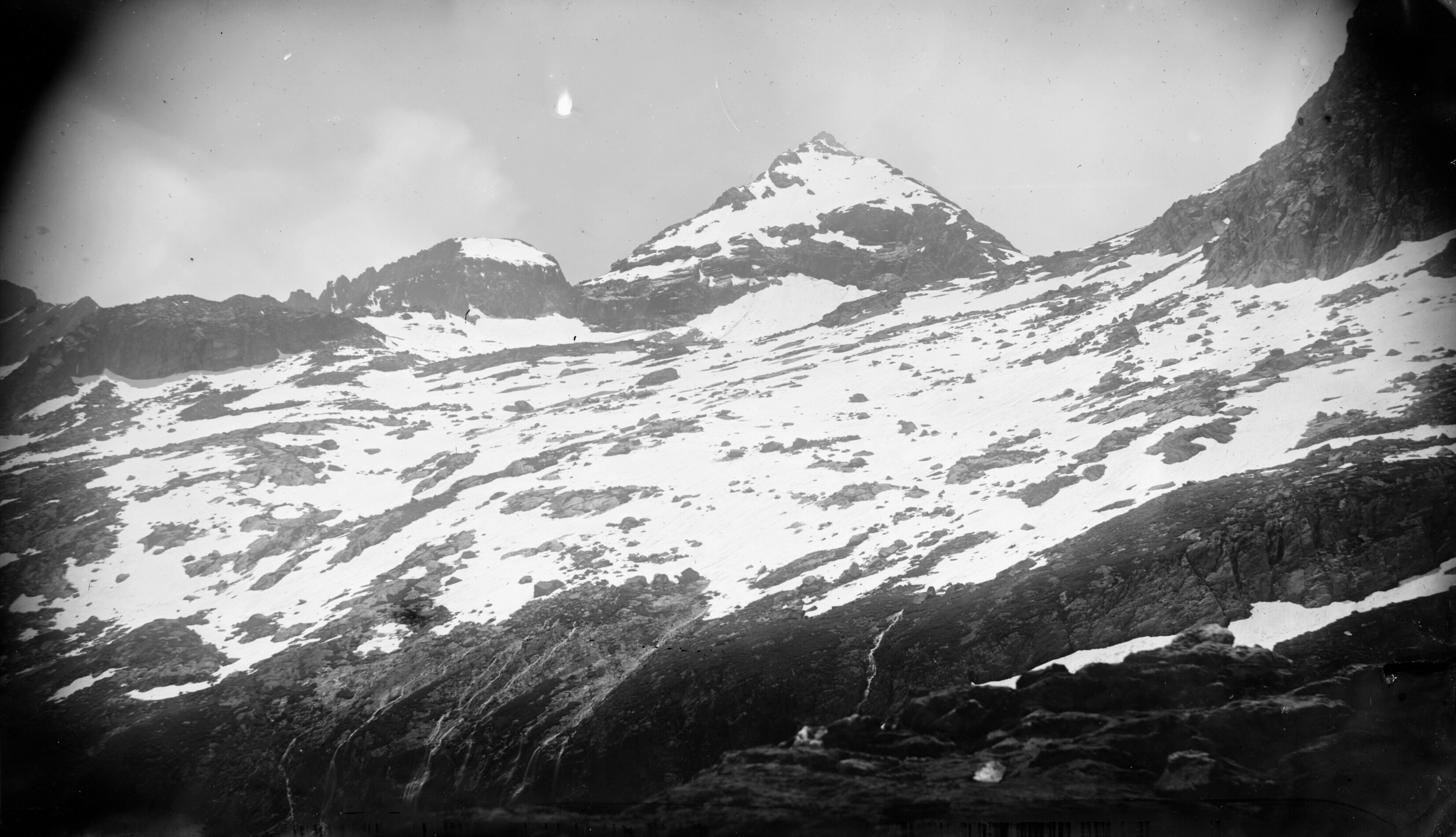

Highest point
- Elevation: 3,109 m (10,200 ft)
- Prominence: 113 m (371 ft)
- Coordinates: 42°42′04″N 0°32′46″E

Geography
- Location within Pyrenees
- Location: France–Spain border
- Région Communauté: Midi-Pyrénées; Aragon
- Département Province: Haute-Garonne; Huesca
- Parent range: Pyrenees

Geology
- Mountain type: Granite

Climbing
- Easiest route: From refuge du Maupas

The pic de Maupas or tuca de Malpás is a peak in the central Pyrenees, culminating at 3,109 m (10,200 ft) on the Franco-Spanish border.

== Toponymy ==
Maupas means "bad passage" because the passage from the Maupas glacier (now disappeared) to the summit slope is a little awkward.

== Geography ==
It is located in Aragon in Spain and Haute-Garonne department (France), above Bagnères-de-Luchon.

== Topography ==
It dominates the cirque des Crabioules and Superbagnères to the north, and the valle de Remuñe to the south.

== Geology ==
The summit is mainly granitic.

== Access ==
There are many climbing routes. Access is possible on the eastern ridges (from the pic de Boum) and west (from the col des Crabioules, or by intermediate skiing slopes). The standard route lies to the north via the refuge du Maupas, then the pass between la Tusse and the pic de Maupas.

== See also ==
- List of Pyrenean three-thousanders
