= Pic Schrader =

Mountain in the Pyrenees

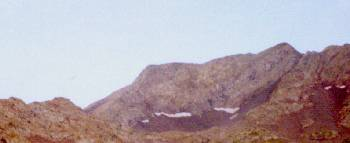
- Pic Schrader (on the right) and Punta del Sabre (left)

Highest point
- Elevation: 3,177 m (10,423 ft)
- Coordinates: 42°41′58″N 0°23′43″E

Geography
- Location within Pyrenees
- Location: France – Spain
- Région Communauté: Midi-Pyrénées; Aragon
- Département Province: Hautes-Pyrénées; Huesca
- Parent range: Massif du Batchimale (Pyrenees)

Climbing
- First ascent: August 11, 1878 by Franz Schrader and Henri Passet
- Easiest route: Par le versant espagnol, en partant de Viados

The Pic Schrader or Grand Batchimale is a central Pyrenean summit, culminating at 3,177 m (10,423 ft), located for the most part in Spain. It buckles the Louron valley with its impressive silhouette

It is located between the massifs of Monte Perdido and Posets.

== Toponymy ==
Formerly named Grand Batchimale, it was renamed in honour of the mountaineer, cartographer, geographer and landscape painter Franz Schrader (1844-1924), who charted many mountains and valleys in the Pyrenees in the 19th century and who carried out its first known ascent on August 11, 1878, with the mountain guide Henri Passet.

The name Batchimale is the name of the borderline crest of which it is the highest summit (there is also the Petit Batchimale). Franz Schrader quotes in his memoirs the term Pic Pétard in the sense of Pic Tonnerre ("thunder").

== Topography ==
It is located on the Franco-Spanish borderline crest between the Louron valley (Hautes-Pyrénées) and the Spanish Huesca province, which is also situated on the Pyrenean watershed.

== History ==
On August 11, 1878, at 10:05, the first ascent was carried out by Franz Schrader, Henri Passet and a porter whose name is forgotten.

== Access ==
Pic Schrader can be accessed from the French side through the valley of La Pez or from the refuge of La Soula. From the Spanish side, there are two itineraries, from the Viados refuge, following the western crest of la Punta del Sabre and, less frequented, passing by the Batchimale lakes.

== See also ==
- List of Pyrenean three-thousanders
