= Espadas Peak =

Mountain in Spain

- Pico Espadas
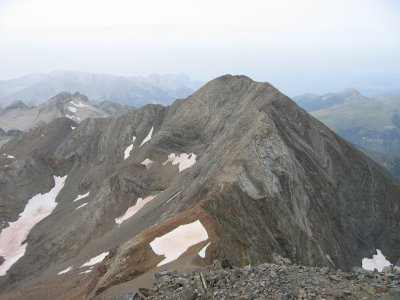

Highest point
- Elevation: 3,332 m (10,932 ft)
- Prominence: 77 m (253 ft)
- Listing: Pyrenean three-thousanders List of mountains in Aragon
- Coordinates: 42°39′3.55″N 0°25′40″E

Geography
- Location within Pyrenees
- Location: Ribagorza, Aragon, Spain
- Parent range: Pyrenees

Geology
- Mountain type: Karstic

Climbing
- First ascent: Unknown
- Easiest route: From Benasque

The Espadas Peak (Spanish: Pico Espadas or Pico de la Espada) is a mountain on the Spanish side of the Pyrenees, in Grist, Sahún municipality, in the north of Ribagorza comarca, Aragon. This mountain is one of the highest in the Pyrenees.

This peak is located close to Pico Posets in an area of many high summits.
