= Grande Fache =

- Gran Facha
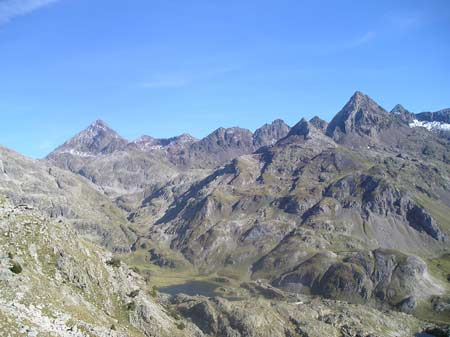
- The cirque of Piedrafita - Grande Fache is the high peak to the left.

Highest point
- Elevation: 3,005 m (9,859 ft)
- Listing: List of Pyrenean three-thousanders
- Coordinates: 42°48′31″N 0°14′16″W

Geography
- Location within Pyrenees
- Location: France — Spain
- Région Communauté: Midi-Pyrénées; Aragon
- Département Province: Hautes-Pyrénées; Huesca
- Parent range: Pyrenees

Climbing
- First ascent: 1874 by Henry Russell and Cauterets Latour

La Grande Fache, Gran Facha or Cúspide de Bachimaña is a summit in the Pyrenees, culminating at 3,005 m, situated on the French-Spanish border and on the pyrenean watershed.

== Topography ==
It rises at the centre of the cirques of Marcadau, Piedrafita and Bachimaña, and is surrounded by many lakes or Ibóns.

Given its high altitude and pyramidal form, it is a well climbed summit.

== History ==
The first ascent was made by Henry Russell and guide Cauterets Latour in the summer of 1874.

== Access ==
From France, a path starts from the Wallon valley and another from the zone de Respomuso (cirque de Piedrafita).
From Spain, the path starts at la Sarra marsh (Sallent de Gállego), goes past the Respumuso dam, the ibón de Campoplano, the Ibóns de la Fache, the port de la Fache and ends by steep slopes up to the summit.
