= Pic de la Munia =

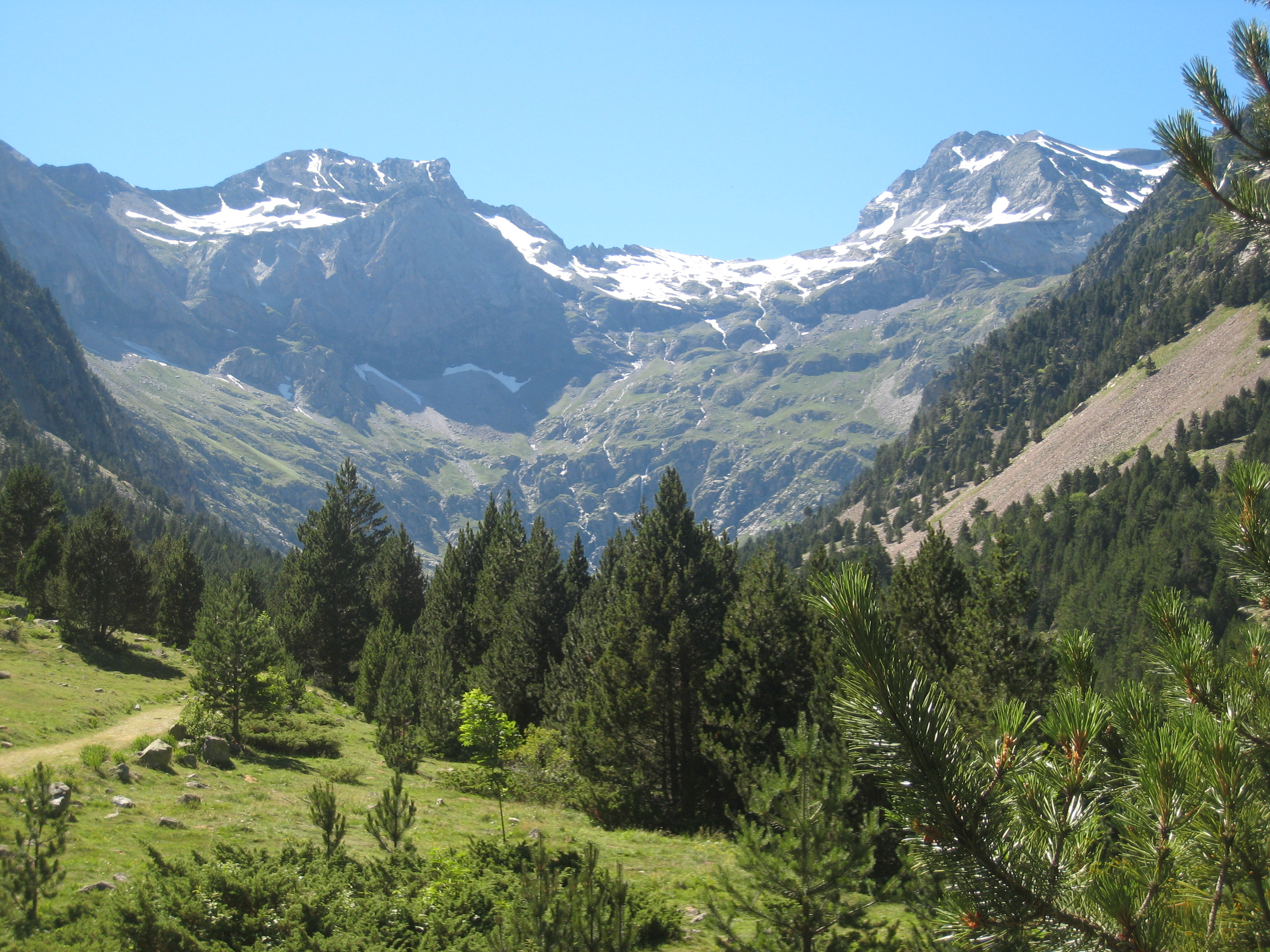
- Le cirque de Barrosa : à gauche, la Robiñera, à droite la Munia.

Highest point
- Elevation: 3,133 m (10,279 ft)
- Coordinates: 42°42′46″N 0°07′58″E

Geography
- Location within Pyrenees
- Région Communauté: Midi-Pyrénées; Aragon
- Département Province: Hautes-Pyrénées; Huesca
- Parent range: Massif de la Munia; Pyrénées

Climbing
- First ascent: Victor Paget and Charles Packe (1864)

The Pic de la Munia culminating at 3,133 m (10,279 ft) is the highest point of the three cirques of Troumouse, Barroude and Barrosa. It is located on the border between France (Hautes-Pyrénées department) and Spain (Huesca province).

== Toponymy ==
Era Munia could mean "nun", from « moniale », of Spanish origin. Otherwise, it could stem from Latin, moenia meaning « walls », which corresponds to its relief.

== Access ==
There are three main access routes which lead to the summit of la Munia.

The first, second and third run along the north face, in the cirque de Troumouse. The starting point is located at the Troumouse car park, at about 2,100 m. The ascent is a bit technical (PD), with two passages : a first wall (III-) that one needs to climb before arriving at the col de la Munia, then the "cat's footstep" (II) shortly before the summit ~ all this achieved in a high mountain landscape. After having reached the col de la Munia (at 2,853 m), the route leading to the summit is leading straight east, by a ridge.

The second starts south, in the Pineta valley at about 1,900 m. A path leads (without any major difficulty) to the col de la Munia, this time from the other side of the mountain. The ascent concludes the same way as the first route.

The third, begins at Troumouse car park, but runs through the most eastern point of the cirque. The ascent is made along the crest, from east to west.

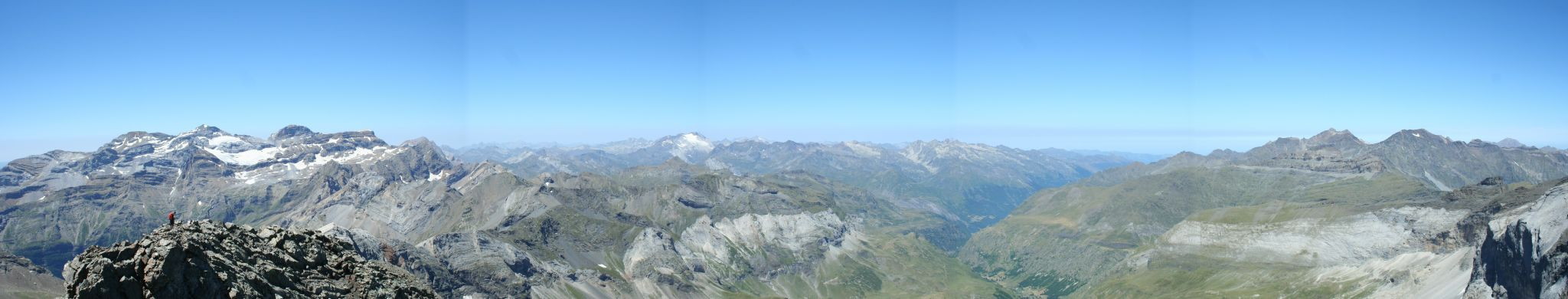
view from la Munia summit

== See also ==
- List of Pyrenean three-thousanders
