= Pic de Montferrat =

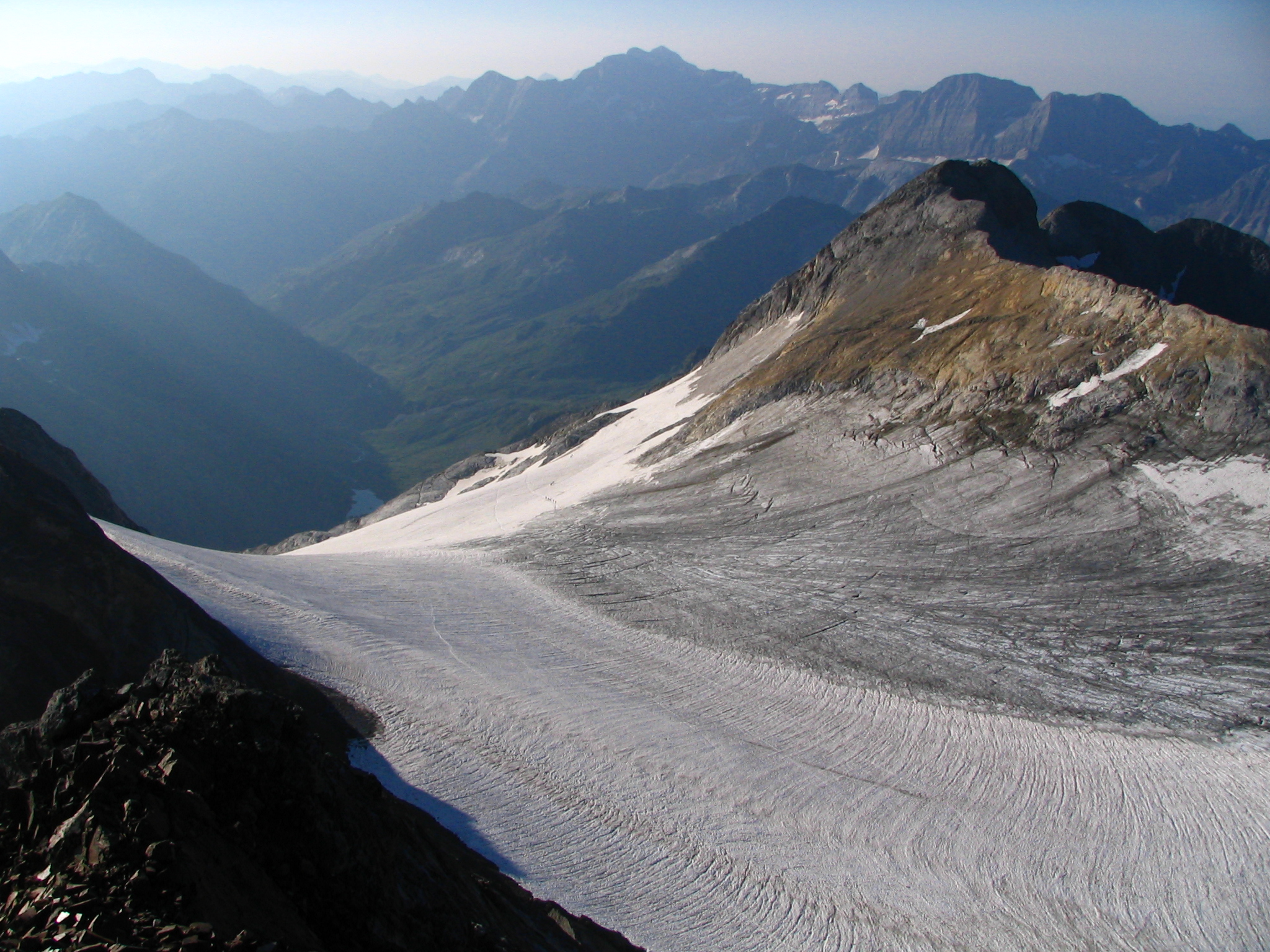
- Le pic de Montferrat (à droite)

Highest point
- Elevation: 3,219 m (10,561 ft)
- Coordinates: 42°46′01″N 0°08′18″E

Geography
- Location within Pyrenees
- Location: France / Spain
- Région Communauté: Midi-Pyrénées; Aragon
- Département Province: Hautes-Pyrénées; Huesca
- Parent range: Massif du Vignemale; Pyrenees

Climbing
- First ascent: 1792 par des bergers ?

The Pic de Montferrat, culminating at 3,129 m (10,266 ft), is a crest summit on the Franco-Spanish border, in the massif du Vignemale in the Pyrenees.

== Topography ==
It is located in the Hautes-Pyrénées department, between Cauterets and Gavarnie, arrondissement of Argelès-Gazost in the Pyrenees National Park. It is bordered to the north by the glacier d'Ossoue and by le petit glacier du Montferrat to the south-east.

== History ==
The first ascension was carried out by shepherds, on August 1, 1792, who built a turret on the summit, ordered by Louis-Philippe Reinhart Junker who led a team of geodesists in charge of defining the Franco-Spanish border path.

== See also ==
- List of Pyrenean three-thousanders
