= Clot de la Hount =

Mountain summit on the Franco-Spanish border

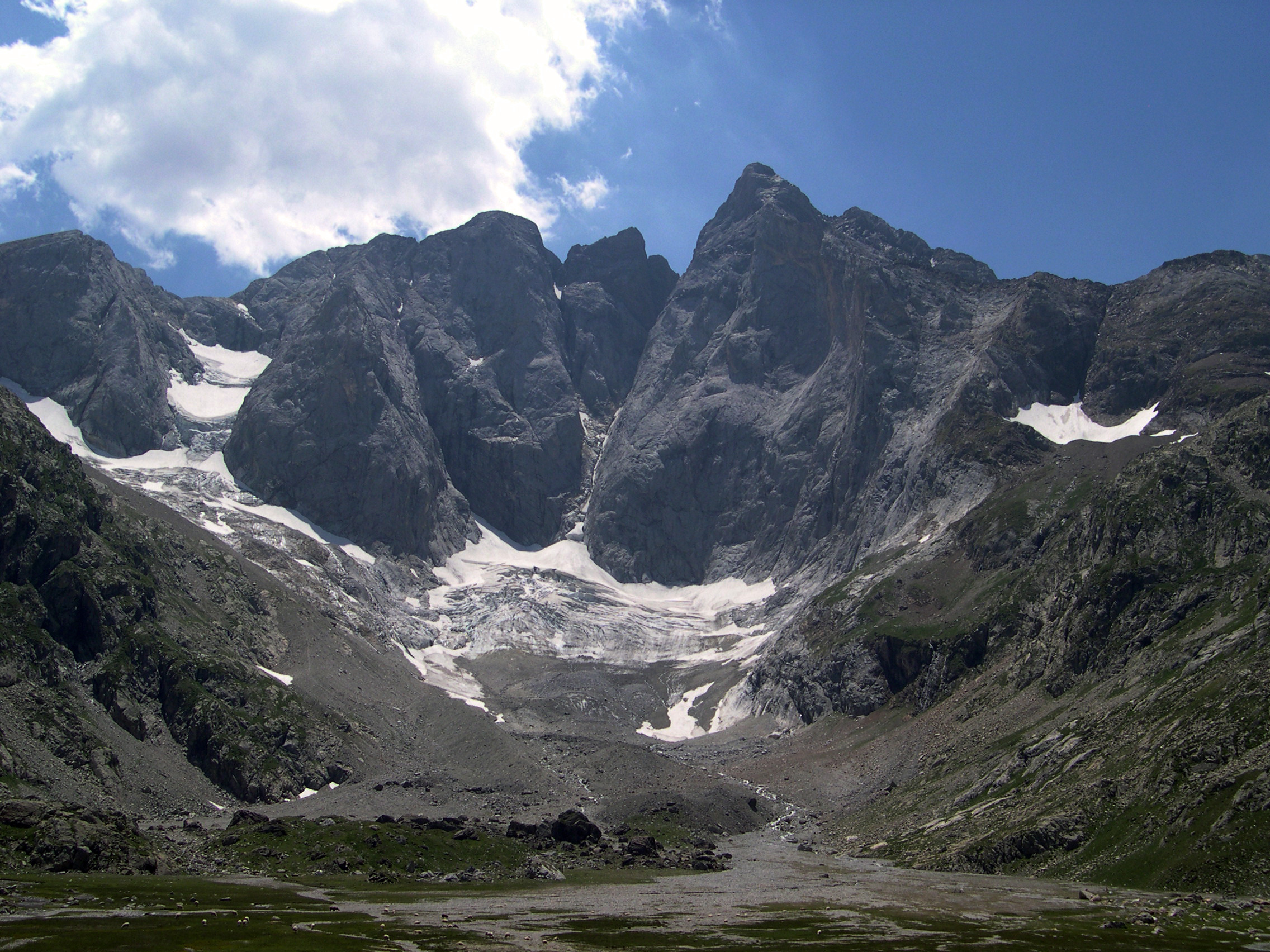
- centre-left

Highest point
- Elevation: 3,289 m (10,791 ft)
- Listing: List of Pyrenean three-thousanders
- Coordinates: 42°46′23″N 0°08′59″E

Geography
- Location within Pyrenees
- Location: France — Spain
- Région Communauté: Midi-Pyrénées; Aragon
- Département Province: Hautes-Pyrénées; Huesca
- Parent range: Vignemale Massif (Pyrenees)

Climbing
- Easiest route: From Glacier d'Ossoue

The Clot de la Hount or pic du clot de la Hount is a summit of the Pyrenees, located on the Franco-Spanish border in the Vignemale Massif, of which it is the second highest summit in the range, at 3,289 m, after Pique Longue (3,298 m).

== Toponymy ==
The Clot de la Hount is a term coined by shepherds for the area near the bottom of the peak.
Hount refers to a spring source which flows intermittently (Hount meaning eye, or a passage that is sometimes open, sometimes shut).
Clot means either a ledge or a pen.

== Topography ==
The French side is located in the Hautes-Pyrénées department, between Cauterets and Gavarnie, in the arrondissement of Argelès-Gazost which lies in the Pyrenees National Park. The southern Spanish side is in the Natural Reserve of Ordesa-Viñamala, in Torla territory, Huesca province.
