= Pyrenees =

Range of mountains in southwest Europe

Pyrenees Mountains
- Spanish: Pirineos; French: Pyrénées; Catalan: Pirineus; Aragonese: Pirineus; Occitan: Pirenèus; Basque: Pirinioak, Auñamendiak
- Aerial view of the mountain range

Highest point
- Peak: Aneto
- Elevation: 3,404 m (11,168 ft)
- Coordinates: 42°37′56″N 00°39′28″E

Dimensions
- Length: 491 km (305 mi)
- Area: 55,000 km^{2} (21,000 mi^{2})

Naming
- Etymology: Named after Pyrene

Geography
- Location within Spain

- Topographic map
- Countries: Spain; France; Andorra
- Range coordinates: 42°42′N 0°36′E

Geology
- Rock ages: Paleozoic; Mesozoic
- Rock types: Granite; gneiss; limestone

The Pyrenees (Note: (UK: /ˌpɪrəˈniːz/ PIRR-ə-NEEZ, US: /ˈpɪrəˌniːz/ PIRR-ə-neez; Spanish: Pirineos [piɾiˈneos]; French: Pyrénées [piʁene]; Catalan: Pirineus [piɾiˈnɛws]; Basque: Pirinioak [piɾini.o.ak]; Occitan: Pirenèus [piɾeˈnɛws]; Aragonese: Pirineus)) is a mountain range in southwestern Europe, straddling the France–Spain border. The Pyrenees extend nearly 500 kilometres (310 mi) from their union with the Cantabrian Mountains to Cap de Creus on the Mediterranean coast, reaching a maximum elevation of 3,404 metres (11,168 ft) at the peak of Aneto, in Huesca, Spain.

The main crest mostly forms a political divide between the states of Spain and France, with the microstate of Andorra sandwiched in between. Historically, the Crown of Aragon and the Kingdom of Navarre extended on both sides of the mountain range.

== Etymology ==
Ancient peoples of the Pyrenees.

In Greek mythology, Pyrene is a princess who gave her name to the Pyrenees. The Greek historian Herodotus says Pyrene is the name of a town in Celtic Europe. According to Silius Italicus, she was the virgin daughter of Bebryx, a king in Mediterranean Gaul by whom the hero Hercules was given hospitality during his quest to steal the cattle of Geryon (Note: Although Geryon was usually located in the mythical west of the setting sun, he was also associated with Iberia; according to Strabo, his triple-body was preserved at Cádiz in the form of a tree.) during his famous Labours. Hercules, characteristically drunk and lustful, violates the sacred code of hospitality and rapes his host's daughter. Pyrene gives birth to a serpent and runs away to the woods, afraid that her father will be angry. Alone, she pours out her story to the trees, attracting the attention of wild beasts who tear her to pieces.

After his victory over Geryon, Hercules passes through the kingdom of Bebryx again, finding the girl's lacerated remains. As is often the case in stories of this hero, the sober Hercules responds with heartbroken grief and remorse at the actions of his darker self, and lays Pyrene to rest tenderly, demanding that the surrounding geography join in mourning and preserve her name: "struck by Herculean voice, the mountaintops shudder at the ridges; he kept crying out with a sorrowful noise 'Pyrene!' and all the rock-cliffs and wild-beast haunts echo back 'Pyrene!' ... The mountains hold on to the wept-over name through the ages." Pliny the Elder connects the story of Hercules and Pyrene to Lusitania, but rejects it as fabulosa, highly fictional.

Other classical sources derived the name from the Greek word for fire, Ancient Greek: πῦρ (IPA: /pŷːr/). According to Greek historian Diodorus Siculus "in ancient times, we are told, certain herdsmen left a fire and the whole area of the mountains was entirely consumed; and due to this fire, since it raged continuously day after day, the surface of the earth was also burned and the mountains, because of what had taken place, were called the Pyrenees."

== Geography ==
=== Political divisions ===
The Spanish Pyrenees are part of the following provinces, from east to west: Girona, Barcelona and Lleida (all in Catalonia), Huesca and Zaragoza (both in Aragon), Navarra (in Navarre) and Gipuzkoa (in the Basque Country).

The French Pyrenees are part of the following départements, from east to west: Pyrénées-Orientales (also known as Northern Catalonia), Aude, Ariège, Haute-Garonne, Hautes-Pyrénées, and Pyrénées-Atlantiques (the latter two of which include the Pyrenees National Park).

The independent principality of Andorra is sandwiched in the eastern portion of the mountain range between the Spanish Pyrenees and French Pyrenees.

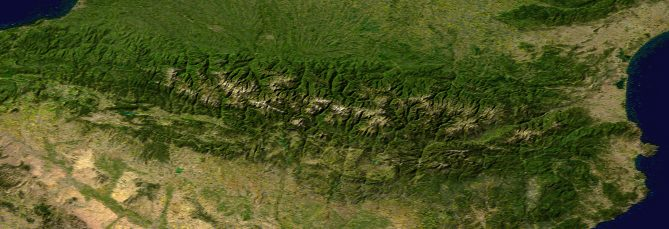
Composite satellite image of the Pyrenees (NASA)

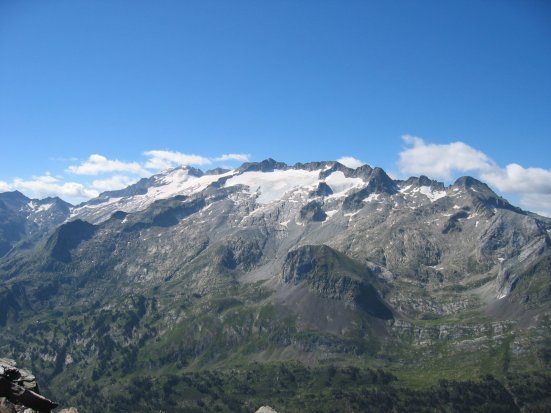
Pico de Aneto, the highest mountain of the Pyrenees, Aragon (Spain)

=== Physiographical divisions ===
Physiographically, the Pyrenees may be divided into three sections: the Atlantic (or Western), the Central, and the Eastern Pyrenees. Together, they form a distinct physiographic province of the larger Alpine System division.

In the Western Pyrenees, from the Basque Mountains near the Bay of Biscay of the Atlantic Ocean, the average elevation gradually increases from west to east.

The Central Pyrenees extend eastward from the Somport pass to the Aran Valley, and they include the highest summits of this range:

- Pico de Aneto 3,404 metres (11,168 ft) in the Maladeta ridge,
- Pico Posets 3,375 metres (11,073 ft),
- Monte Perdido 3,355 metres (11,007 ft).

In the Eastern Pyrenees, with the exception of one break at the eastern extremity of the Pyrénées Ariégeoises in the Ariège area, the mean elevation is remarkably uniform until a sudden decline occurs in the easternmost portion of the chain known as the Albères.

==== Foothills ====
Pedraforca, Pre-Pyrenees, Catalonia (Spain)

Most foothills of the Pyrenees are on the Spanish side, where there is a large and complex system of ranges stretching from Spanish Navarre, across northern Aragon and into Catalonia, almost reaching the Mediterranean coast with summits reaching 2,600 m (8,500 ft). At the eastern end on the southern side lies a distinct area known as the Sub-Pyrenees.

On the French side the slopes of the main range descend abruptly and there are no foothills except in the Corbières Massif in the northeastern corner of the mountain system.

== Geology ==
The Pyrenees are older than the Alps: their sediments were first deposited in coastal basins during the Paleozoic and Mesozoic eras. During Ediacaran to Ordovician times, Pyrenees were located at the Northwest margin of Gondwana, where they formed a lateral continuity of neighbouring areas, such as the Montagne Noire and the Mouthoumet massifs and Southwestern territory of Sardinia. Between 100 and 150 million years ago, during the Early Cretaceous Period, the Bay of Biscay fanned out, pushing present-day Spain against France and applying intense compressional pressure to large layers of sedimentary rock. The intense pressure and uplifting of the Earth's crust first affected the eastern part and moved progressively to the entire chain, culminating in the Eocene Epoch.

The eastern part of the Pyrenees consists largely of granite and gneissose rocks, while in the western part the granite peaks are flanked by layers of limestone. The massive and unworn character of the chain comes from its abundance of granite, which is particularly resistant to erosion, as well as weak glacial development.

The upper parts of the Pyrenees contain low-relief surfaces forming a peneplain. This peneplain originated no earlier than in Late Miocene times. Presumably it formed at height as extensive sedimentation raised the local base level considerably.

== Landscape ==
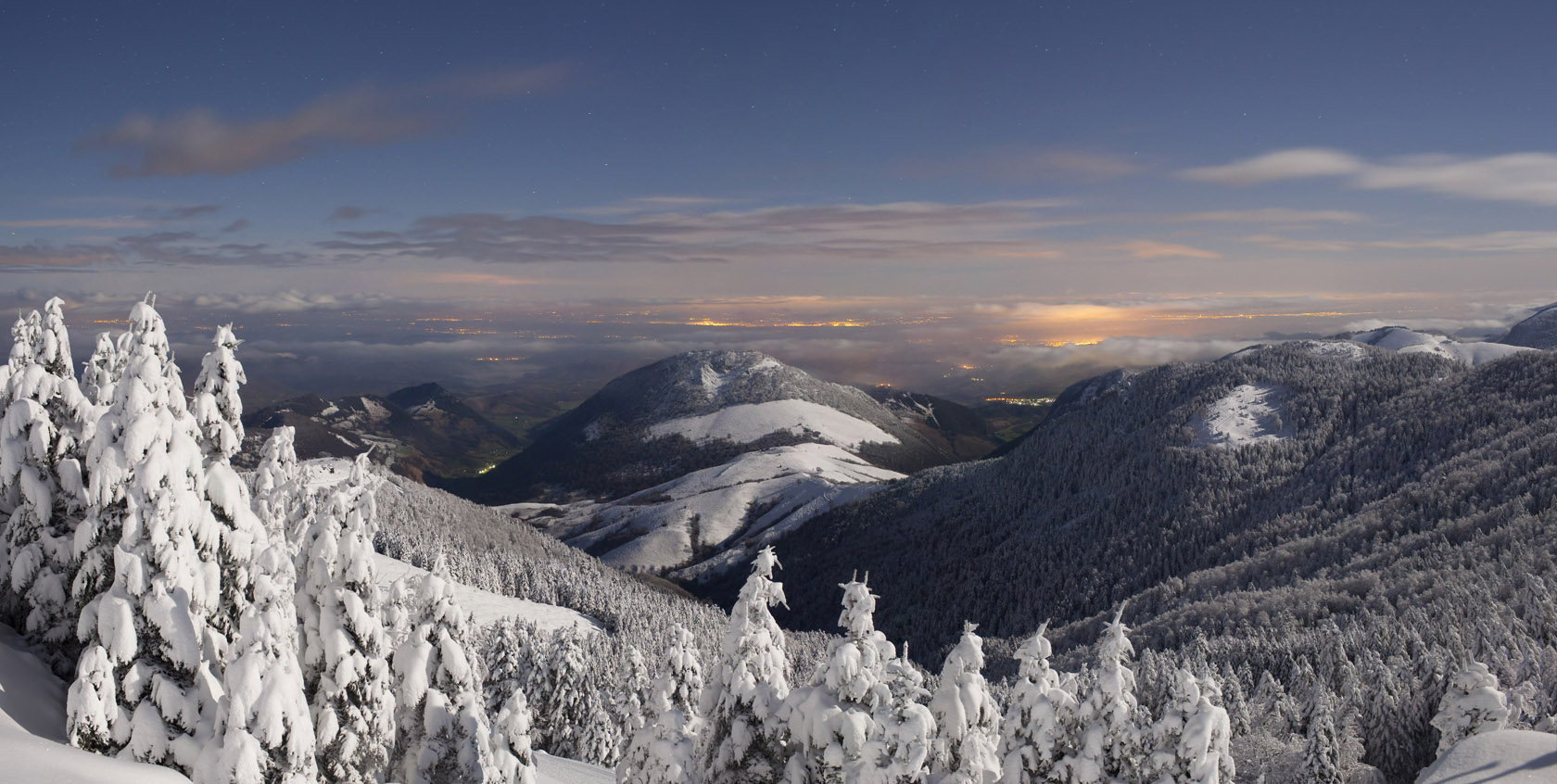
Baretous Valley and Piedmont plain, in the French western Pyrénées

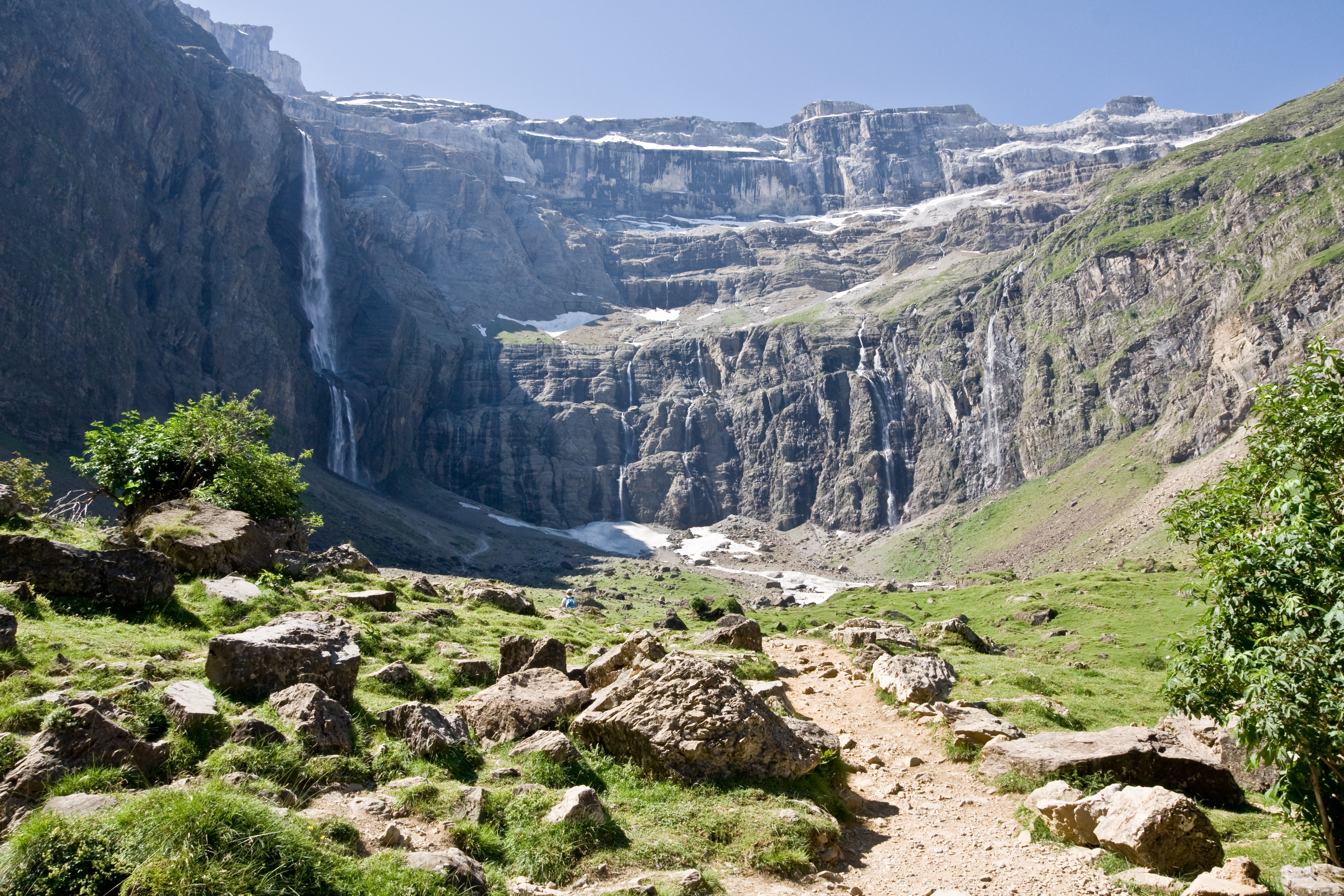
Cirque de Gavarnie with its 422 metre high waterfall, Occitanie (France)

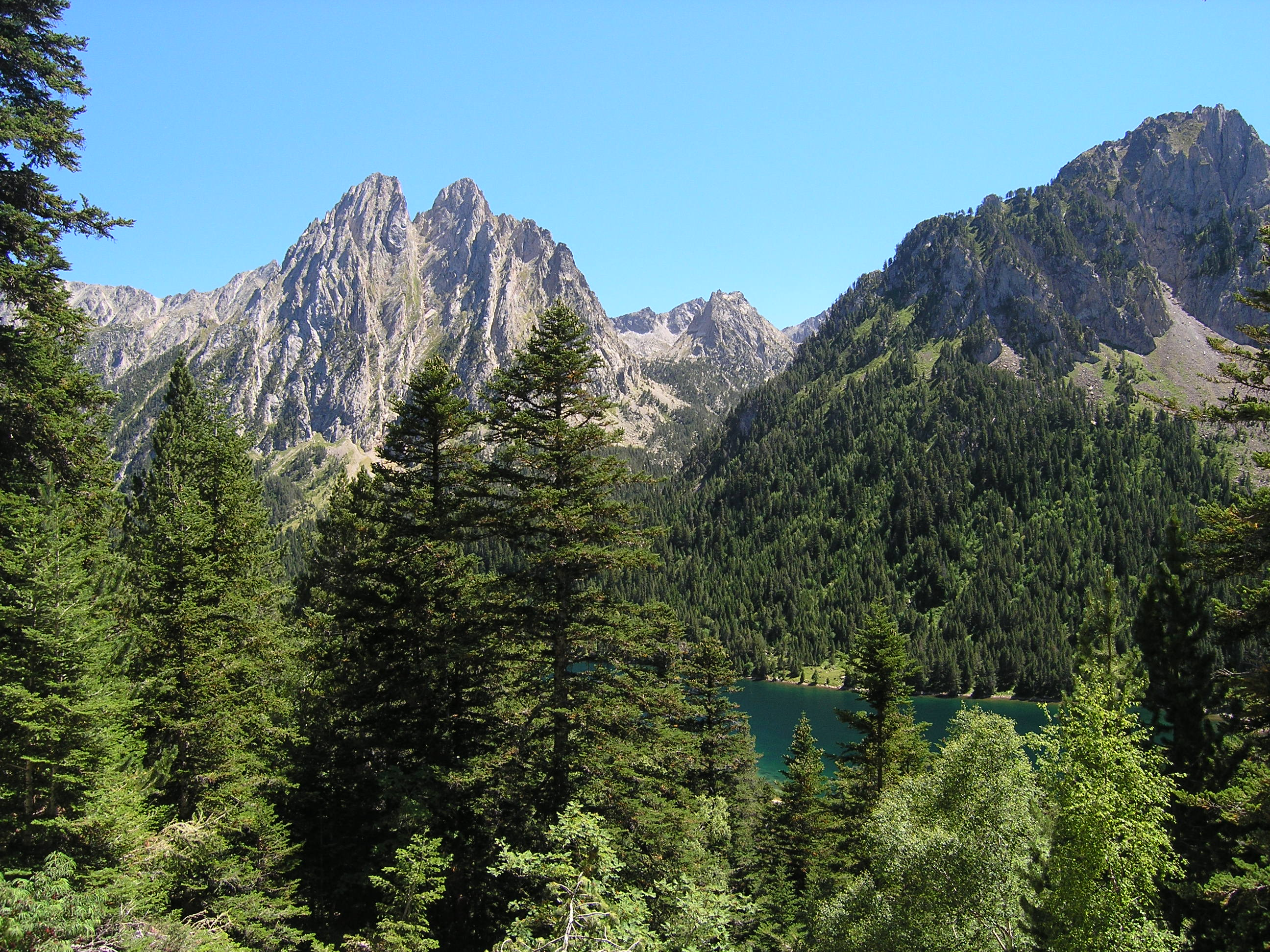
Sant Maurici lake in the Aigüestortes i Estany de Sant Maurici National Park, Catalonia (Spain)

Conspicuous features of Pyrenean scenery are:

- the absence of great lakes, such as those that fill the lateral valleys of the Alps
- the rarity and relative high elevation of usable passes
- the large number of the mountain torrents locally called gaves, which often form lofty waterfalls, surpassed in Europe only by those of Scandinavia
- the frequency with which the upper end of a valley assumes the form of a semicircle of precipitous cliffs, called a cirque.

The highest waterfall is Gavarnie (422 m or 1,385 ft), at the head of the Gave de Pau; the Cirque de Gavarnie, in the same valley, together with the nearby Cirque de Troumouse and Cirque d'Estaubé, are notable examples of the cirque formation.

Low passes are lacking, and the principal roads and the railroads between France and Spain run only in the lowlands at the western and eastern ends of the Pyrenees, near sea level. The main passes of note are:

- Col de la Perche (1,581 m (5,187 ft)), towards the east, between the valley of the Têt and the valley of the Segre,
- Col de Puymorens (1,920 m (6,300 ft)), on European route E09 between France and Spain.
- The nearby Pas de la Casa or Port d'Envalira, the highest road pass in the Pyrenees at 2,408 m (7,900 ft), and one of the highest points of the European road network, which provides the route from France to Andorra,
- The Port de la Bonaigua (2,070 m (6,790 ft)), in the middle of the range at the head of the Aran Valley.
- Plan de Beret (1,870 m (6,140 ft))
- Col du Pourtalet (1,794 m (5,886 ft)).
- The Col de Somport or Port de Canfranc (1,632 m (5,354 ft)), where there were old Roman roads.
- Col de la Pierre St Martin (1,766 m (5,794 ft))
- Puerto de Larrau (1,578 m (5,177 ft))
- The Roncevaux Pass (1,057 m (3,468 ft)), entirely in Navarre (Spain) is an important point on the Camino de Santiago pilgrimage route.

Because of the lack of low passes a number of tunnels have been created, beneath the passes at Somport, Envalira, and Puymorens and new routes in the center of the range at Bielsa and Vielha.

A notable visual feature of this mountain range is La Brèche de Roland, a gap in the ridge line, which – according to legend – was created by Roland.

== Natural resources ==
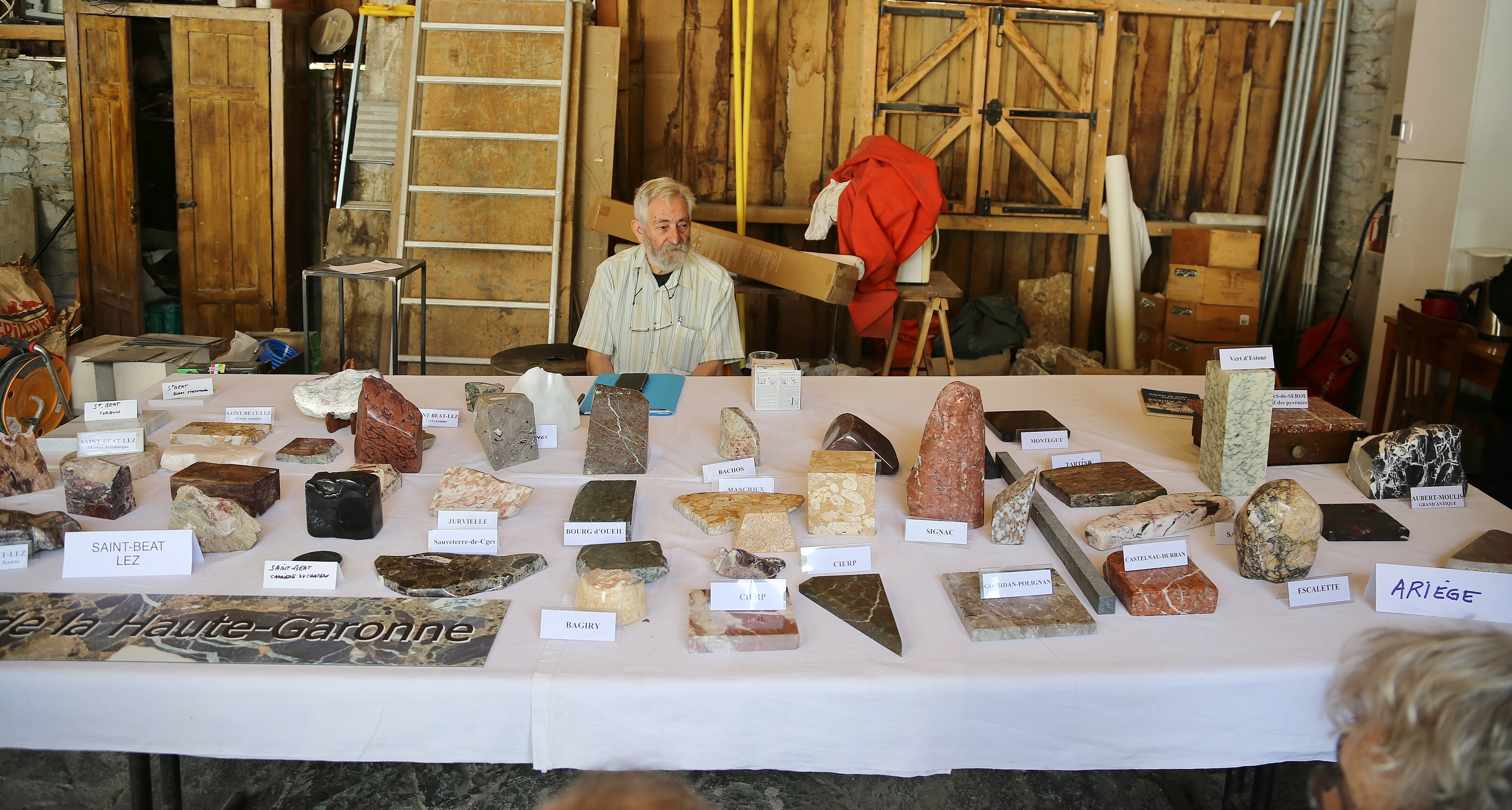
Various samples of Pyrenean marbles

The metallic ores of the Pyrenees are not in general of much importance now, though there were iron mines at several locations in Andorra, as well as at Vicdessos in Ariège, and the foot of Canigó in Pyrénées-Orientales in the past. Coal deposits capable of being profitably worked are situated chiefly on the Spanish slopes, but the French side has beds of lignite. The open pit of Trimoun near the commune of Luzenac (Ariège) is one of the greatest sources of talc in Europe.

There are many marble quarries in the Pyrenees, most of which were opened by the Romans in ancient times. Quarried intermittently, they provided prestigious marbles such as Grand Antique (used in Rome and Constantinople by the Romans), statuary white marbles as well as coloured marbles used to decorate the royal palaces of the Louvre and Versailles in France and the Royal Palace of Madrid in Spain.

Mineral springs are abundant and remarkable, and especially noteworthy are the hot springs. The hot springs, among which those of Les Escaldes in Andorra, Panticosa and Lles in Spain, Ax-les-Thermes, Bagnères-de-Luchon and Eaux-Chaudes in France may be mentioned, are sulfurous and mostly situated high, near the contact of the granite with the stratified rocks. The lower springs, such as those of Bagnères-de-Bigorre (Hautes-Pyrénées), Rennes-les-Bains (Aude), and Campagne-sur-Aude (Aude), are mostly selenitic and not hot.

== Climate ==
The amount of precipitation the range receives, including rain and snow, is much greater in the western than in the eastern Pyrenees because of the moist air that blows in from the Atlantic Ocean over the Bay of Biscay. After dropping its moisture over the western and central Pyrenees, the air is left dry over the eastern Pyrenees. The winter average temperature is −2 °C (28 °F).

Sections of the mountain range vary in more than one respect. There are some glaciers in the western and snowy central Pyrenees, but there are no glaciers in the eastern Pyrenees because there is insufficient snowfall to cause their development. Glaciers are confined to the northern slopes of the central Pyrenees, and do not descend, like those of the Alps, far down into the valleys but rather have their greatest lengths along the direction of the mountain chain. They form, in fact, in a narrow zone near the crest of the highest mountains. Here, as in the other great mountain ranges of central Europe, there is substantial evidence of a much wider expanse of glaciation during the glacial periods. The best evidence of this is in the valley of Argeles Gazost, between Lourdes and Gavarnie, in the département of Hautes-Pyrénées.

The annual snow-line varies in different parts of the Pyrenees from about 2,700 to 2,800 metres (8,900 to 9,200 ft) above sea level. On average the seasonal snow is observed at least 50% of the time above 1,600 metres (5,200 ft) between December and April.

== Flora and fauna ==
=== Flora ===
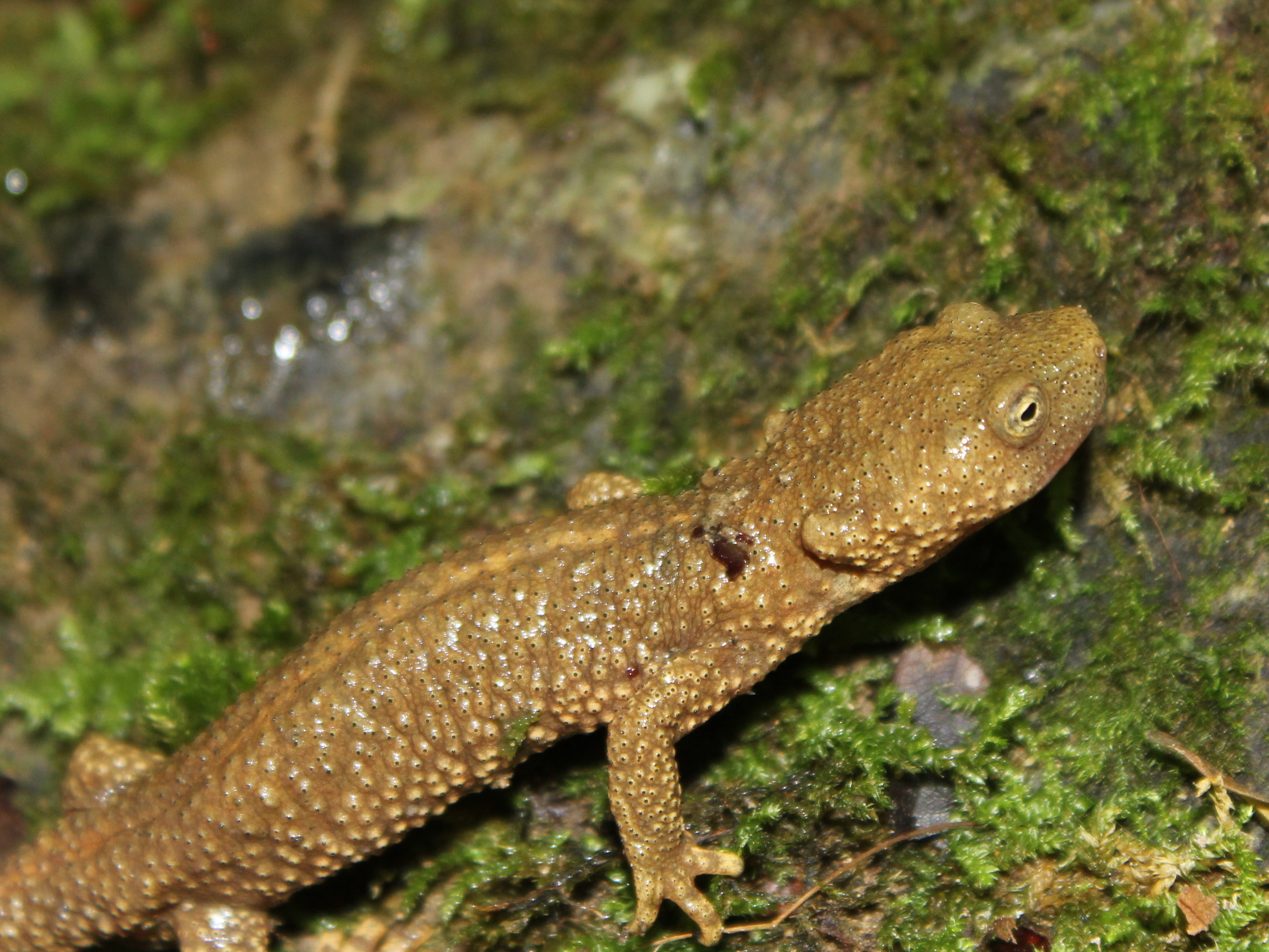
Pyrenean brook salamander is an endemic amphibian in the Pyrenees

A still more marked effect of the preponderance of rainfall in the western half of the chain is seen in the vegetation. The lower mountains in the extreme west are wooded, but the extent of forest declines as one moves eastwards. The eastern Pyrenees are peculiarly wild and barren, all the more since it is in this part of the chain that granitic masses prevail. Also moving from west to east, there is a change in the composition of the flora, with the change becoming most evident as one passes the centre of the mountain chain from which point the Corbières Massif stretch north-eastwards towards the central plateau of France. Though the difference in latitude is only about 1°, in the west the flora resembles that of central Europe while in the east it is distinctly Mediterranean in character. The Pyrenees are nearly as rich in endemic species as the Alps, and among the most remarkable instances of that endemism is the occurrence of the monotypic genus Xatardia (family Apiaceae), which grows only on a high alpine pass between the Val d'Eynes and Catalonia. Other examples include Arenaria montana, Bulbocodium vernum, and Ranunculus glacialis. The genus most abundantly represented in the range is that of the saxifrages, several species of which are endemic here.

=== Fauna ===
In their fauna the Pyrenees present some striking instances of endemism. The Pyrenean desman is found only in some of the streams of the northern slopes of these mountains; the only other desman, the Russian desman, is confined to the Volga river basin in southern Russia, Kazakhstan and Ukraine. The Pyrenean brook salamander (Calotriton asper), an endemic amphibian, also lives in streams and lakes located at high altitudes. Among other peculiarities of Pyrenean fauna are blind insects in the caverns of Ariège, the principal genera of which are Anophthalmus and Adelops.

The Pyrenean ibex, an endemic subspecies of the Iberian ibex, became extinct in January 2000; another subspecies, the western Spanish ibex, was introduced into the area, with the population numbering over 400 individuals as of 2020. The native brown bear population was hunted to near-extinction in the 1990s, but its numbers rebounded in 1996 when three bears were brought from Slovenia. The bear population has bred successfully, and there are now believed to be about 15 brown bears in the central region around Fos, with only four native ones still living in the Aspe Valley.

== Protected areas ==
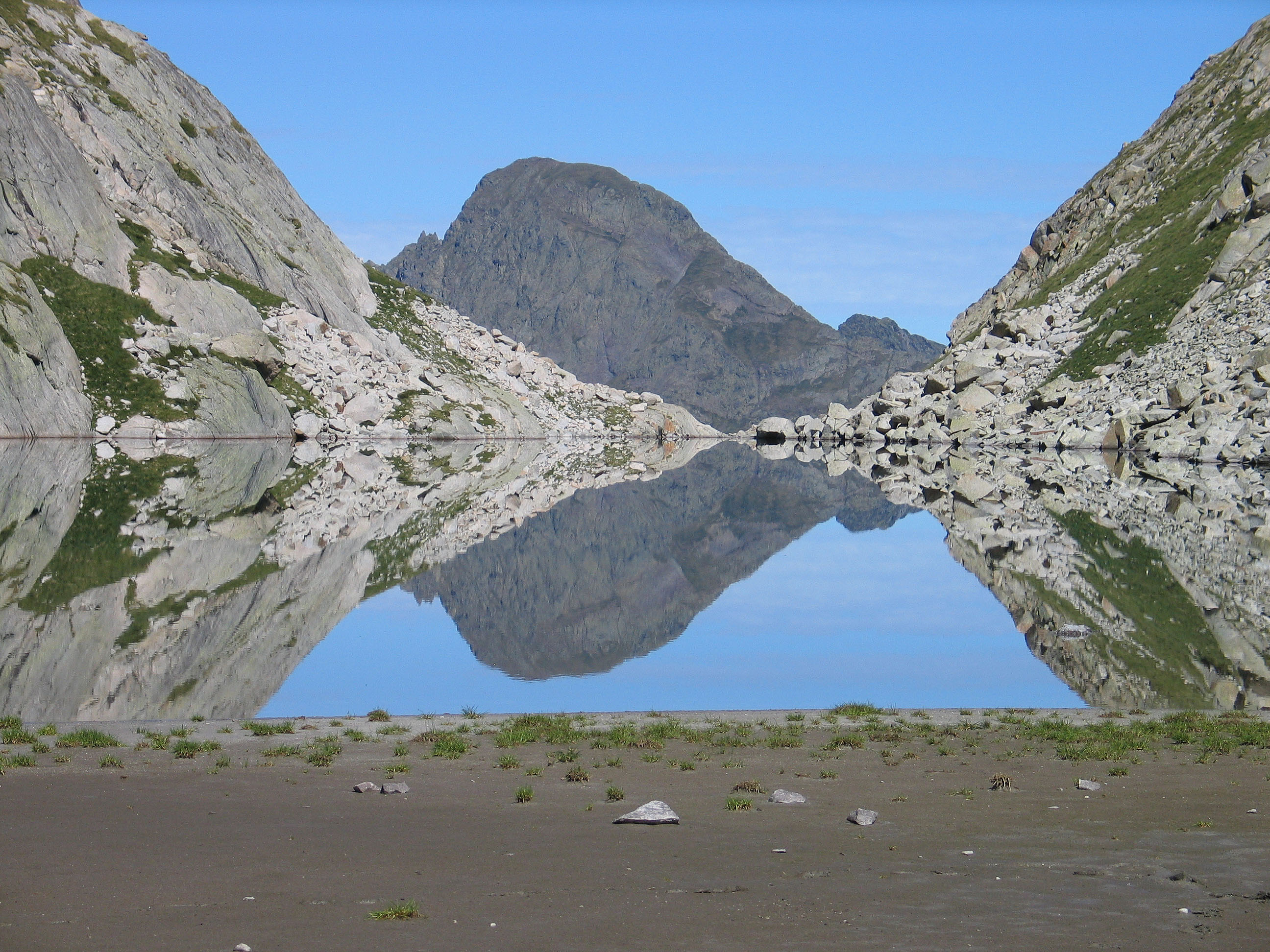
Ibón de Barrancs (glacial lake) in Posets-Maladeta Natural Park, Aragon (Spain)

Principal nature reserves and national parks:

- Ordesa y Monte Perdido National Park (Spain)
- Pyrénées National Park (France)
- Aigüestortes i Estany de Sant Maurici National Park (Spain)
- Posets-Maladeta Natural Park (Spain)

In 1997, part of the Pyrenees (including Ordesa y Monte Perdido National Park and Pyrenees National Park) was inscribed on the UNESCO World Heritage List for its spectacular geologic landforms and testimony to the unique "transhumance" agricultural system.

== Demographics and culture ==
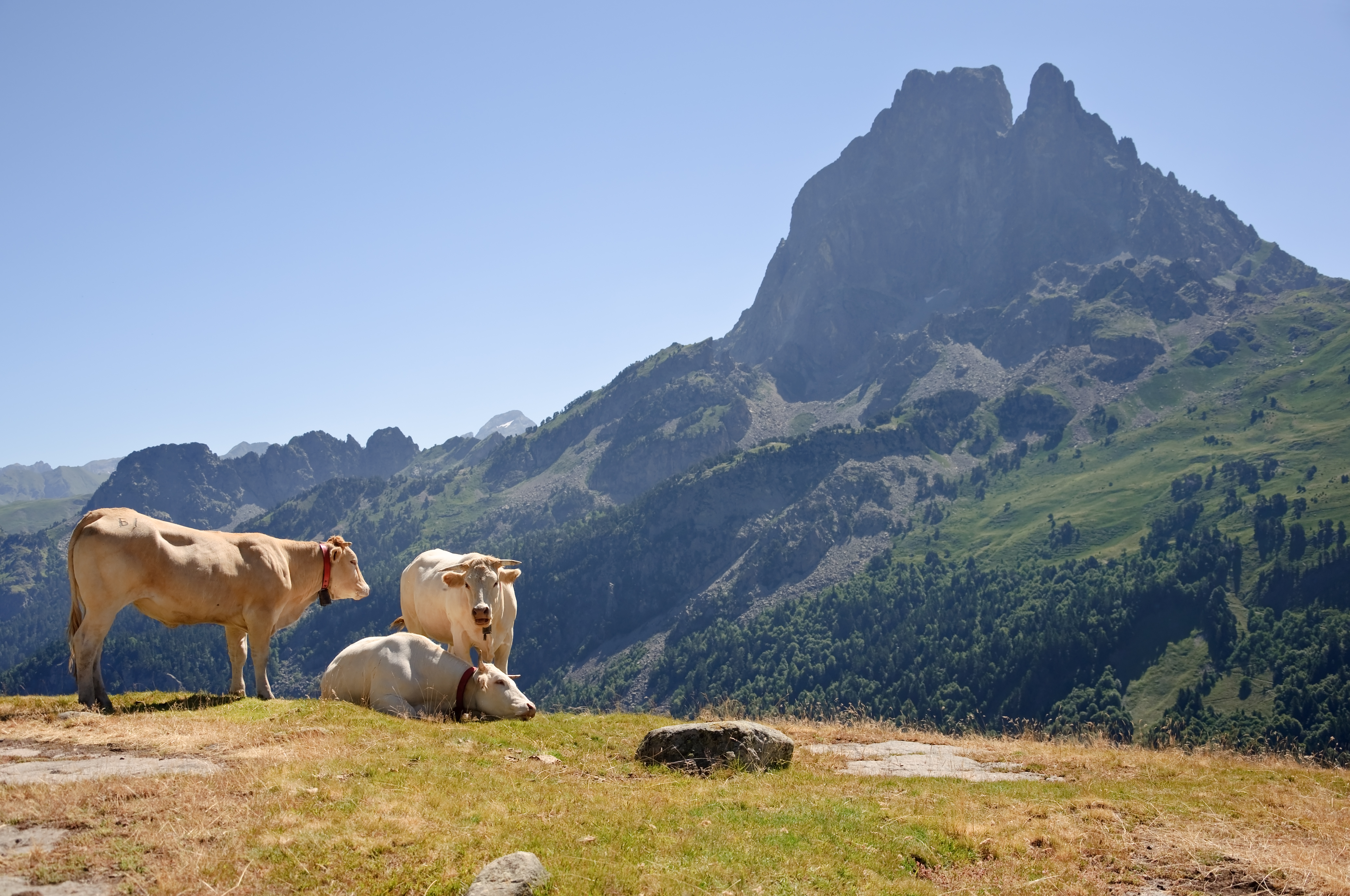
Some Blonde d'Aquitaine on summer pasture near the Pic du Midi d'Ossau

The Pyrenean region possesses a varied ethnology, folklore and history: see Andorra; Aragon; Ariège; Basque Country; Béarn; Catalonia; Navarre; Roussillon. For their history, see also Almogavars, Marca Hispanica.

The principal languages spoken in the area are Spanish, French, Aragonese, Catalan (in Andorra and in Northern and Southern Catalonia), and Basque. Also spoken, to a lesser degree, is the Occitan language, consisting of the Gascon and Languedocien dialects in France and the Aranese dialect in the Aran Valley.

An important feature of rural life in the Pyrenees is 'transhumance', the moving of livestock from the farms in the valleys up to the higher grounds of the mountains for the summer. In this way the farming communities could keep larger herds than the lowland farms could support on their own. The principal animals moved were cows and sheep, but historically most members of farming families also moved to the higher pastures along with their animals, so they also took with them pigs, horses and chickens. Transhumance thus took the form of a mass biannual migration, moving uphill in May or June and returning to the farms in September or October. During the summer period, the families would live in basic stone cabins in the high mountains.

Nowadays, industrialisation and changing agriculture practices have diminished the custom. However, the importance of transhumance continues to be recognised through its celebration in popular festivals.

== Scientific facilities ==
=== Pic du Midi Observatory ===
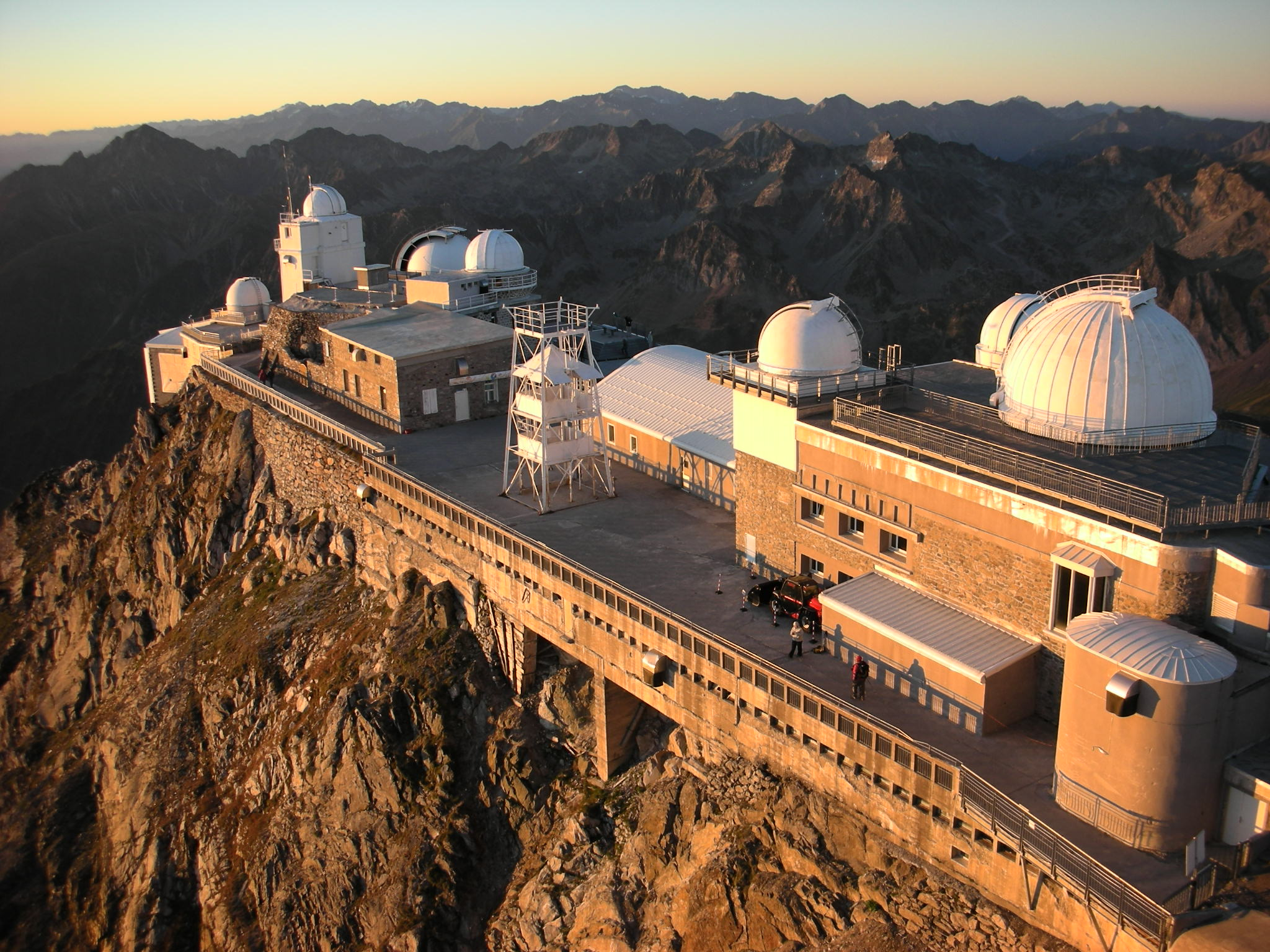
The observatory on the Pic du Midi de Bigorre.

The Pic du Midi Observatory is an astronomical observatory located at 2877 metres on top of the Pic du Midi de Bigorre in the French Pyrenees. Construction of the observatory began in 1878 and the 8-metre dome was completed in 1908.

The observatory housed a powerful mechanical equatorial reflector which was used in 1909 to formally discredit the Martian canal theory. A 1.06-metre (42 in) telescope was installed in 1963, funded by NASA and was used to take detailed photographs of the surface of the Moon in preparation for the Apollo missions. Other studies conducted in 1965 provided a detailed analysis of the composition of the atmospheres on Mars and Venus, this served as a basis for Jet Propulsion Laboratory scientists to predict that these planets had no life.

Since 1980, the observatory has had a 2-metre telescope, which is the largest telescope in France. Overtaken by the giant telescopes built in recent decades, today the observatory is widely open to amateur astronomy.

=== Odeillo solar furnace ===
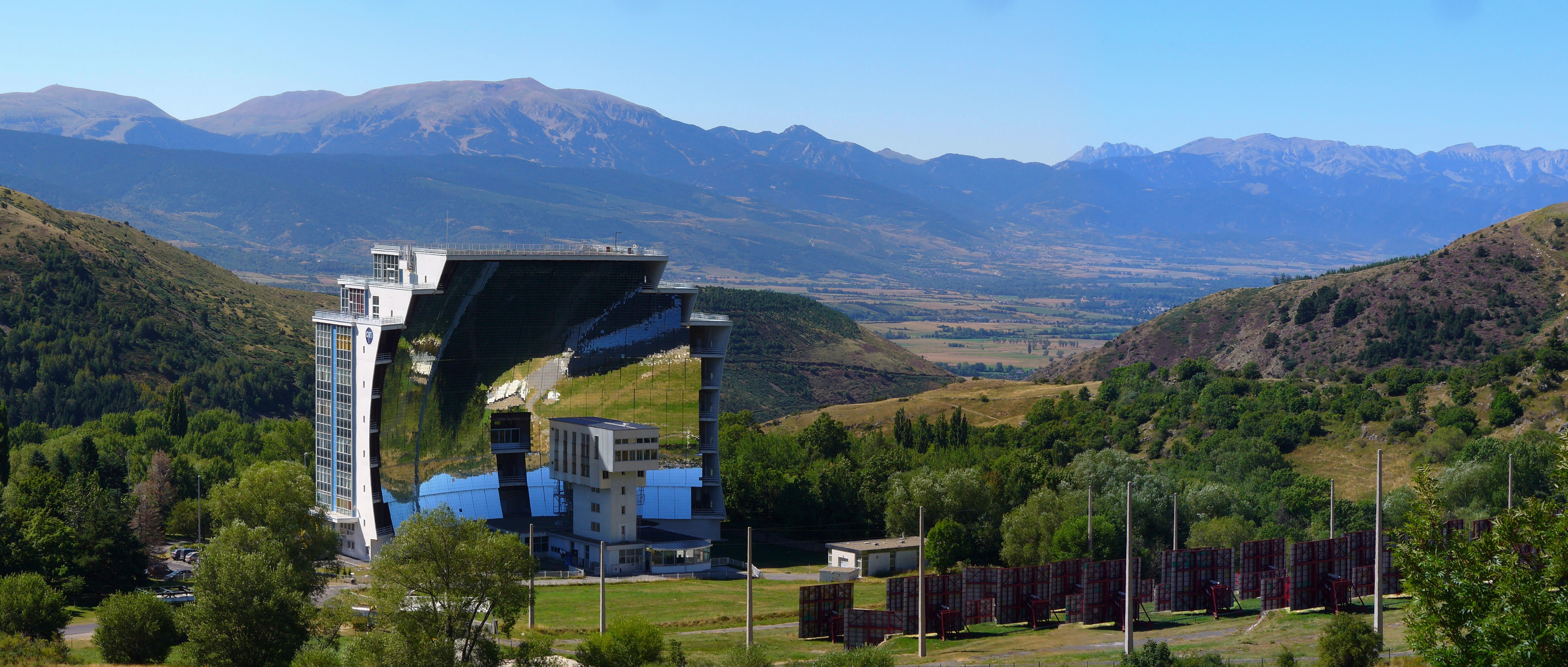
Odeillo solar furnace.

The Odeillo solar furnace is the world's largest solar furnace. It is situated in Font-Romeu-Odeillo-Via, in the department of Pyrénées-Orientales, in south of France. Built between 1962 and 1968, it is 54 metres (177 ft) and 48 metres (157 ft) wide, and includes 63 heliostats. The site was chosen because of the length and the quality of sunshine with direct light (more than 2,500 h/year) and the purity of its atmosphere (high elevation and low average humidity).

This furnace serves as a science research site studying materials at very high temperatures. Temperatures above 3,500 °C (6,330 °F) can be obtained in a few seconds; in addition, it provides rapid temperature changes and therefore allows studying the effect of thermal shocks.

== Urban areas ==
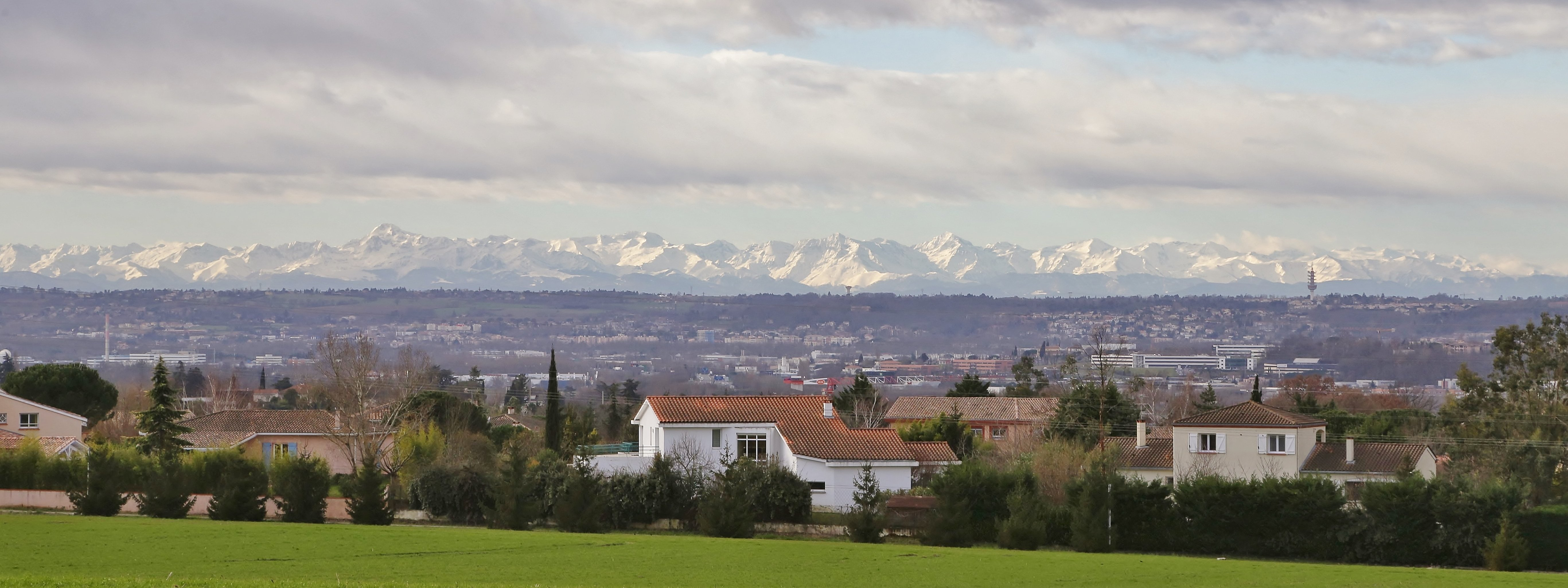
The Pyrenees mountain range seen from Toulouse.

There are two roads each side of the mountains: the E15 road (parallel with the Perthus railway tunnel) near the Mediterranean end and the E5/E70/E80 road on the opposite Atlantic end, both having opened in the 1970s. No big cities are in the range itself. The largest urban area close to the Pyrenees is Toulouse (Haute-Garonne), France with a population of 1,330,954 in its metropolitan area. On the Spanish side Pamplona (Navarre) is the closest city, with a population of 319,208 in its metropolitan area. Inside the Pyrenees the main towns are Andorra la Vella (22,256) and Escaldes-Engordany (14,367) in Andorra, Jaca (12,813), La Seu d'Urgell (12,252) and Ripoll (10,773) in Spain, and Lourdes (13,976), Saint-Gaudens (11,869) and Foix (10,046) in France.

== Highest summits ==
The following is the complete list of the summits of the Pyrenees above 3,000 metres:

1. Aneto (3,404 m) (Aragon)
2. Posets (3,375 m) (Aragon)
3. Monte Perdido (3,355 m) (Aragon)
4. Punta de Astorg (3,355 m) (Aragon)
5. Pico Maldito (3,350 m) (Aragon)
6. Espalda del Aneto (3,350 m) (Aragon)
7. Pico del Medio (3,346 m) (Aragon)
8. Espadas Peak (3,332 m) (Aragon)
9. Cilindro de Marboré (3,325 m) (Aragon)
10. Maladeta (3,312 m) (Aragon)
11. Vignemale (3,298 m) (Aragon-France)
12. Pico Coronas (3,293 m) (Aragon)
13. Pico Tempestades (3,290 m) (Aragon)
14. Clot de la Hount (3,289 m) (Aragon-France)
15. Soum de Ramond (3,259 m) (Aragon)
16. 1st Western Peak Maladeta (3,254 m) (Aragon)
17. Pic de Marboré (3,252 m) (Aragon-France)
18. Cerbillona (3,247 m) (Aragon-France)
19. Perdiguero (3,221 m) (Aragon-France)
20. 2nd Western Peak Maladeta (3,220 m) (Aragon)
21. Pic de Montferrat (3,219 m) (Aragon-France)
22. Pico Russell (3,205 m) (Aragon)
23. Pointe Chausenque (3,204 m) (France)
24. Piton Carré (3,197 m) (France)
25. Pic Long (3,192 m) (France)
26. 3rd Western Peak Maladeta (3,185 m) (Aragon)
27. Pic Schrader (3,177 m) (Aragon-France)
28. Campbieil (3,173 m) (France)
29. Pic de la cascade oriental (3,161 m) (Aragon-France)
30. Les Jumeaux Ravier (3,160 m) (Aragon)
31. Grand Tapou (3,160 m) (Aragon-France)
32. Pic Badet (3,150 m) (France)
33. Balaïtous (3,144 m) (Aragon-France)
34. Pic du Taillon (3,144 m) (Aragon-France)
35. Pica d'Estats (3,143 m) (Catalonia-France)
36. Punta del Sabre (3,136 m) (Aragon)
37. Diente de Alba (3,136 m) (Aragon)
38. Pic de la Munia (3,134 m) (Aragon-France)
39. Pointe de Literole (3,132 m) (Aragon-France)
40. Pic Verdaguer (3,131 m) (Catalonia-France)
41. Pic du Milieu (3,130 m) (Aragon-France)
42. Pic des Gourgs Blancs (3,129 m) (Aragon-France)
43. Les Veterans (3,125 m) (Aragon)
44. Pico Pavots (3,121 m) (Aragon)
45. Pic de Royo (3,121 m) (Aragon-France)
46. Punta Ledormeur (3,120 m) (Aragon-France)
47. Pico Alba (3,118 m) (Aragon)
48. Pic des Crabioules (3,116 m) (Aragon-France)
49. Seil Dera Baquo (3,110 m) (Aragon-France)
50. Pic de Maupas (3,109 m) (Aragon-France)
51. Pic Lézat (3,107 m) (France)
52. Western Crabioules (3,106 m) (Aragon-France)
53. Pico Brulle (3,106 m) (Aragon-France)
54. Pic de la cascade occidental (3,095 m) (Aragon-France)
55. Pic de Néouvielle (3,091 m) (France)
56. Serre Mourene (3,090 m) (Aragon-France)
57. Pic de Troumouse (3,085 m) (Aragon-France)
58. Pico Posets (3,085 m) (Aragon)
59. Infierno central (3,083 m) (Aragon)
60. Pics d'Enfer (3,082 m) (France)
61. Pico de Bardamina (3,079 m) (Aragon)
62. Pic de la Paul (3,078 m) (Aragon)
63. Pic de Montcalm (3,077 m) (France)
64. Infierno oriental (3,076 m) (Aragon)
65. Pic Maou (3,074 m) (France)
66. Infierno occidental (3,073 m) (Aragon)
67. Épaule du Marboré (3,073 m) (Aragon-France)
68. Pic du port de Sullo (3,072 m) (Catalonia-France)
69. Frondella NE (3,071 m) (Aragon)
70. Grand pic d' Astazou (3,071 m) (Aragon-France)
71. Pico de Vallibierna (3,067 m) (Aragon)
72. Pico Marcos Feliu (3,067 m) (Aragon-France)
73. Pic des Spijeoles (3,066 m) (France)
74. Pico Jean Arlaud (3,065 m) (Aragon)
75. Tuca de Culebras (3,062 m) (Aragon-France)
76. Grand Quayrat (3,060 m) (France)
77. Pic Maubic (3,058 m) (France)
78. Pico Gran Eriste (3,053 m) (Aragon)
79. Garmo negro (3,051 m) (Aragon)
80. Pic du Portillon (3,050 m) (Aragon-France)
81. Pico Argualas (3,046 m) (Aragon)
82. Baudrimont NW (3,045 m) (Aragon)
83. Pic de Eristé sur (3,045 m) (Aragon)
84. Pic Camboue (3,043 m) (France)
85. Trois Conseillers (3,039 m) (France)
86. Pico Aragüells (3,037 m) (Aragon)
87. Pico Algas (3,036 m) (Aragon)
88. Turon de Néouvielle (3,035 m) (France)
89. Pic de Batoua (3,034 m) (Aragon)
90. Gabietou occidental (3,034 m) (Aragon-France)
91. Comaloforno (3,033 m) (Catalonia)
92. Petit Vignemale (3,032 m) (France)
93. Gabietou oriental (3,031 m) (Aragon-France)
94. Pic de Bugarret (3,031 m) (France)
95. South Besiberri Massif (3,030 m) (Catalonia)
96. Pic de l'Abeille (3,029 m) (Aragon-France)
97. Baudrimont SE (3,026 m) (Aragon)
98. Pic Béraldi (3,025 m) (Aragon)
99. Pico de la Pez (3,024 m) (Aragon)
100. Pic de Lustou (3,023 m) (France)
101. Pic Heid (3,022 m) (France)
102. Pic de Crabounouse (3,021 m) (France)
103. Pico de Clarabide (3,020 m) (Aragon-France)
104. Pico del puerto de la pez (3,018 m) (Aragon-France)
105. Dent d'Estibère male (3,017 m) (France)
106. North Besiberri Massif (3,014 m) (Catalonia)
107. Punta Alta Massif (3,014 m) (Catalonia)
108. Petit Astazou (3,012 m) (Aragon-France)
109. Pic Ramougn (3,011 m) (France)
110. Pico de Gias (3,011 m) (Aragon)
111. Tuc de Molières (3,010 m) (Catalonia-Aragon)
112. Tour du Marboré (3,009 m) (Aragon-France)
113. Pic Belloc (3,008 m) (France)
114. Pic Forqueta (3,007 m) (Aragon)
115. Pic d'Estaragne (3,006 m) (France)
116. Pico de Boum (3,006 m) (Aragon-France)
117. Casque du Marboré (3,006 m) (Aragon-France)
118. Arnales (3,006 m) (Aragon)
119. Grande Fache (3,005 m) (Aragon-France)
120. Pico Robiñera (3,005 m) (Aragon)
121. Pic de Saint Saud (3,003 m) (France)
122. Middle Besiberri S (3,003 m) (Catalonia)
123. Middle Besiberri N (3,002 m) (Catalonia)
124. Pointe Célestin Passet (3,002 m) (Catalonia)
125. Punta de las Olas (3,002 m) (Aragon)
126. Frondella SW (3,001 m) (Aragon)

=== Notable summits below 3,000 metres ===
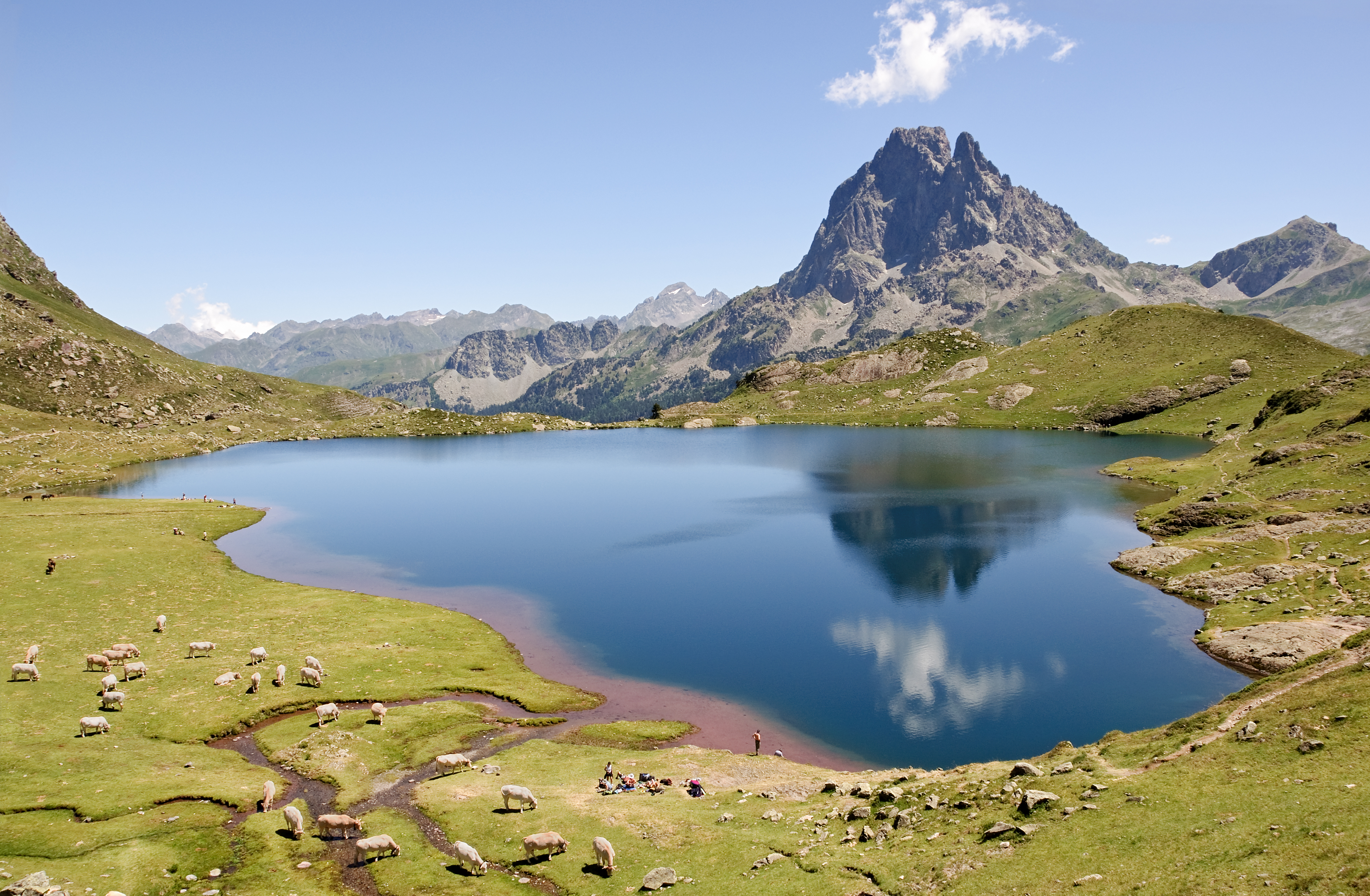
Pic du Midi d'Ossau reflected in the lac Gentau

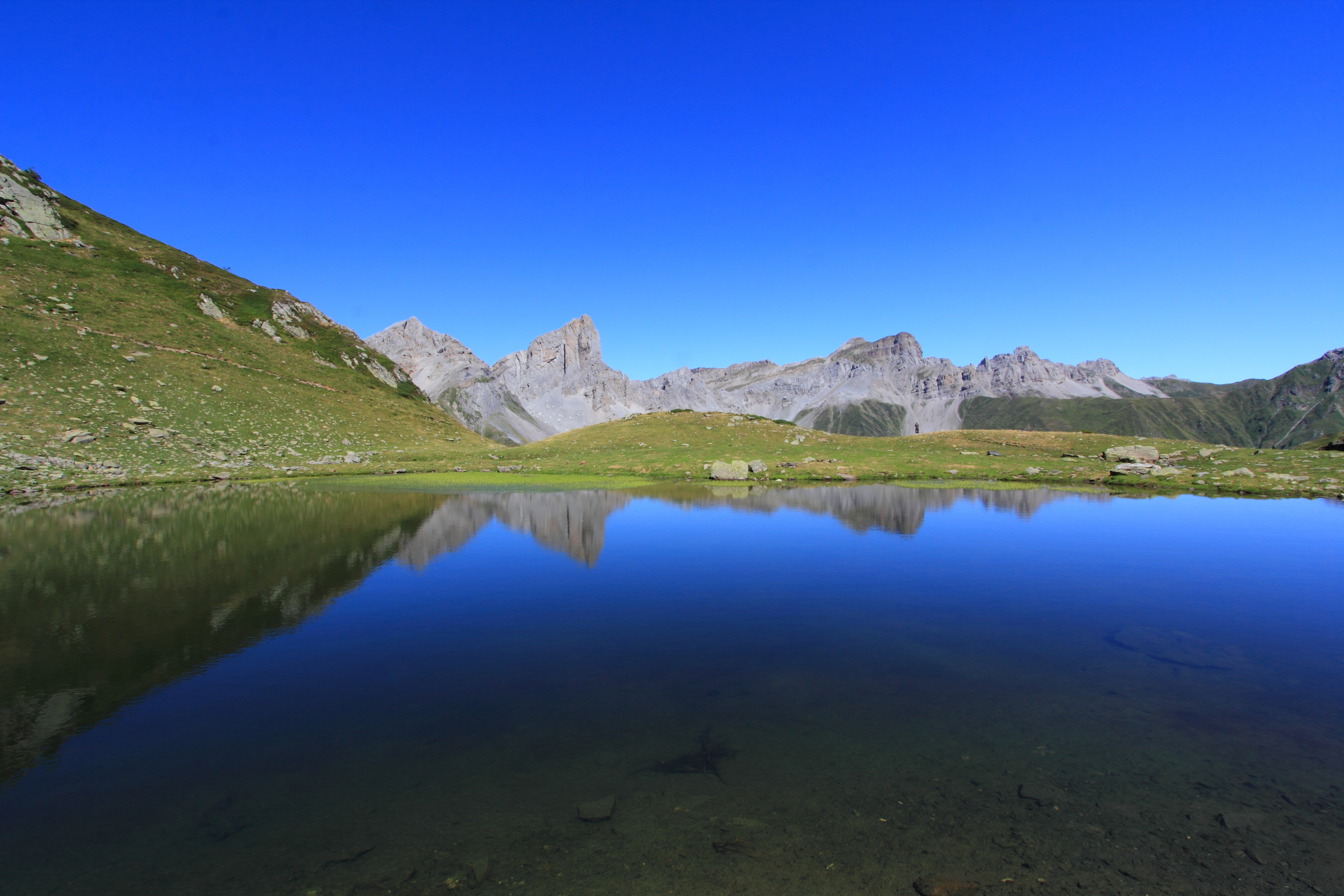
Aiguilles d'Ansabère and Mesa de los Tres Reyes reflected in the lake of Ansabère

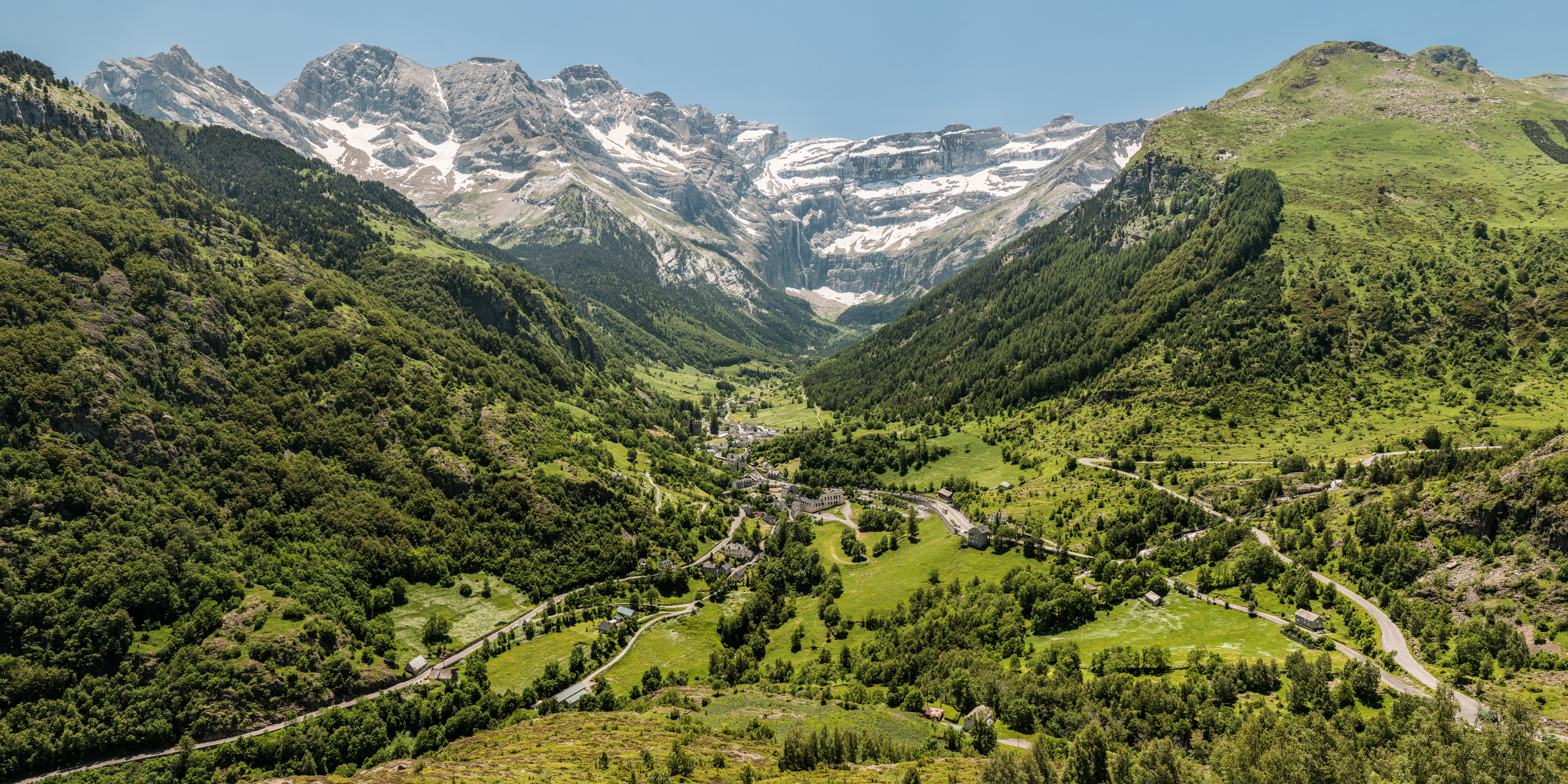
Gavarnie

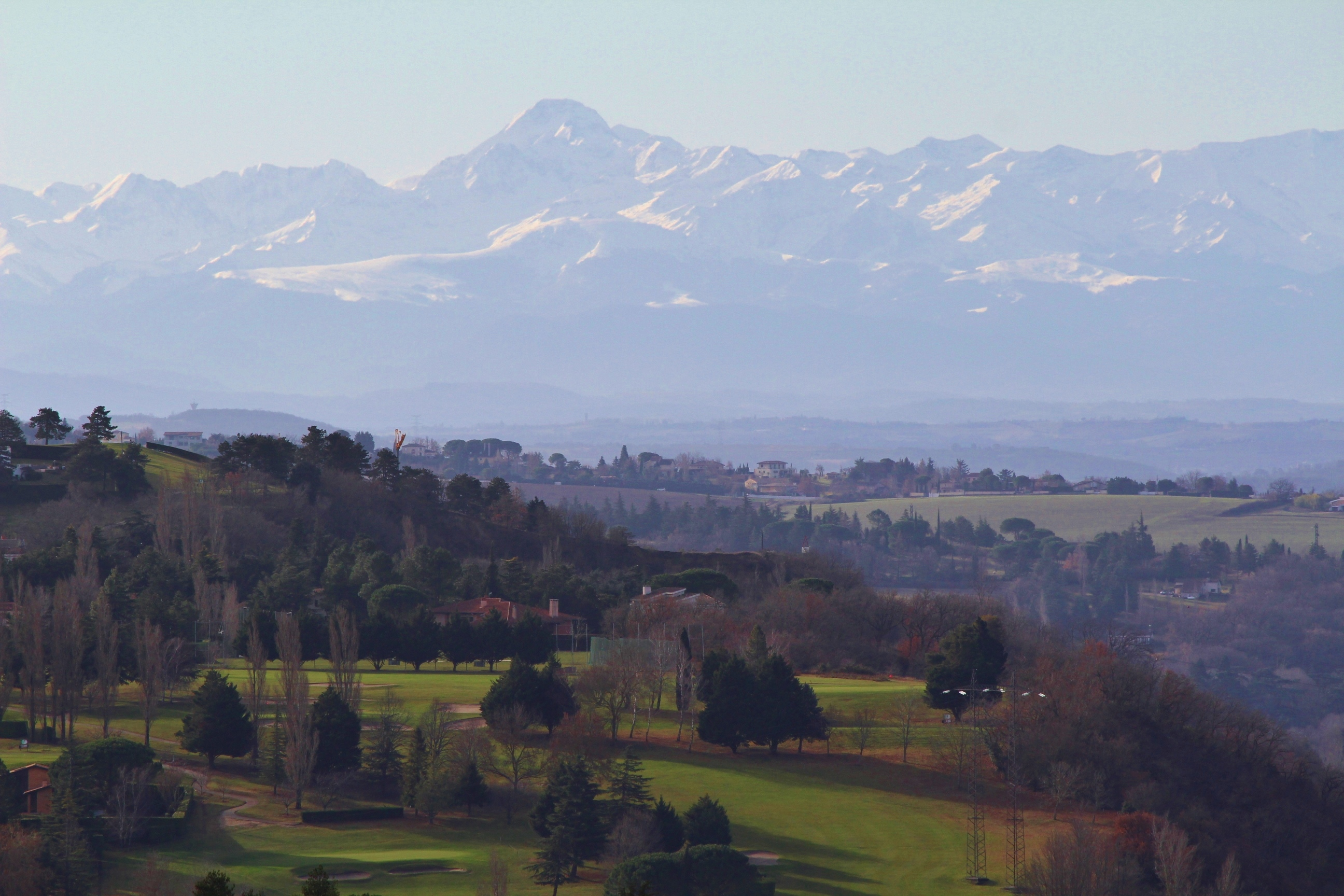
Mont Valier
- Pic de Palas (2,974 m)
- Pic de Comapedrosa (2,942 m) - highest point of Andorra
- Pic Carlit (2,921 m)
- Puigmal (2,913 m)
- Cotiella (2,912 m)
- Pic de Sanfonts (2,894 m)
- Pic d'Envalira (2,827 m)
- Collarada (2,886 m)
- Pic du Midi d'Ossau (2,885 m)
- Pic du Midi de Bigorre (2,876 m)
- Mont Valier (2,838 m)
- Petit Pic du Midi d'Ossau (2,812 m)
- Pic du Canigó (2,786 m)
- Peña Telera (2,764 m)
- Casamanya (2,740 m)
- Cambre d'Aze (2.726 m)
- Cap de la cometa del forn (2,691 m)
- Visaurin (2,668 m)
- Pic del Port Vell (2,655 m)
- Aspe peak (2,645 m)
- Pic dels Aspres (2,562 m)
- Pedraforca (2,506 m)
- Pic d'Anie (2,504 m)
- Pic de Pedraforca (2,498 m)
- Pique d'Endron (2,472 m)
- Pic de Madrès (2,469 m)
- Mesa de los Tres Reyes (2,428 m)
- Grande Aiguille d'Ansabère (2,376 m)
- Pic du Soularac (2,368 m)
- Pic du Saint Barthélémy (2,348 m)
- Peña Montañesa (2,291 m)
- Peña Foratata (2,282 m)
- Pic des Trois Seigneurs (2,199 m)
- Pic d'Orhy (2,017 m)
- Chamanchoya (1,935 m)
- Otsogorrigaina (1,922 m)
- Pic de Cagire (1,912 m)
- Pic du Gar (1,785 m)
- Urkulu (1,419 m)
- Larrun (905 m)
- Mount Baigura (897 m)

== Sports and leisure ==
Ski Center, Cerler (Spain)

Both sides of the Pyrenees are popular spots for winter sports such as alpine skiing and mountaineering. The Pyrenees are also a good place for athletes to do high-elevation training in the summer, such as by bicycling and cross-country running.

In the summer and the autumn, the Pyrenees are usually featured in two of cycling's grand tours, the Tour de France held annually in July and the Vuelta a España held in September. The stages held in the Pyrenees are often crucial legs of both tours, drawing hundreds of thousands of spectators to the region.

Three main long-distance footpaths run the length of the mountain range: the GR 10 across the northern slopes, the GR 11 across the southern slopes, and the HRP which traverses peaks and ridges along a high elevation route. In addition, there are numerous marked and unmarked trails throughout the region.

Pirena is a dog-mushing competition held in the Pyrenees.

=== Ski resorts ===
Ski resorts in the Pyrenees include:

- Alp 2500 (Spain)
- Arette (France)
- Astún (Spain)
- Artouste (France)
- Ax-les-Thermes (France)
- Baqueira-Beret (Spain)
- Boí Taüll Resort (Spain)
- Bareges-La Mongie (Tourmalet) (France)
- Luz Ardiden (France)
- Bourg-d'Oueil (France)
- Cauterets (France)
- Candanchú (Spain)
- Cerler (Spain)
- Espot Esquí (Spain)
- Font-Romeu (France)
- Formigal (Spain)
- Gavarnie Gèdre (France)
- Gourette (France)
- Guzet-Neige (France)
- Hautacam (France)
- La Molina (Spain)
- La Pierre Saint Martin
- Le Mourtis (France)
- Les Angles (France)
- Luchon-Superbagnères (France)
- Luz-Ardiden (France)
- Nistos cap nestes (France)
- Panticosa-Los Lagos (Spain)
- Pas de la Casa (Andorra)
- Peyragudes (France)
- Piau-Engaly (France)
- Port Ainé (Spain)
- Port del Comte (Spain)
- Somport (France-Spain)
- Saint Lary (France)
- Soldeu / El Tarter (Andorra)
- Superbagnères (France)
- Tavascan (Spain)
- Vall de Núria (Spain)
- Vallnord (Andorra)
- Vallter 2000 (Spain)

== See also ==
- Montcalm Massif
- Pre-Pyrenees
- Pyreneanism
- Megalithic sites in Pyrénées-Orientales
- Category:Mountain passes of the Pyrenees
