= Pico Tempestades =

Mountain in Spain

Pico Tempestades is a Spanish mountain which is part of Pyrenees range of mountains. It is located in Benasque Valley. Consequently, it is placed in the north-east of Huesca and in the north-east of Aragon.
