= Grand Quayrat =

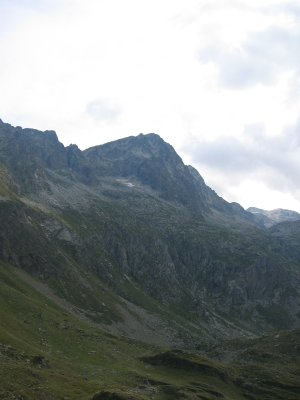
- Le Grand Quayrat, depuis le refuge d'Espingo

Highest point
- Elevation: 3,060 m (10,040 ft)
- Listing: List of Pyrenean three-thousanders
- Coordinates: 42°42′48″N 0°30′54″E

Geography
- Location within Pyrenees
- Location: Haute-Garonne, France
- Parent range: Pyrenees

Climbing
- First ascent: 1789 by Henri Reboul

The pic du Grand Quayrat is a French pyrenean summit, culminating at 3,060 m (10,040 ft) in the vallée d'Oô (commune d'Oô near Bagnères-de-Luchon in the Haute-Garonne department, Midi-Pyrénées region).

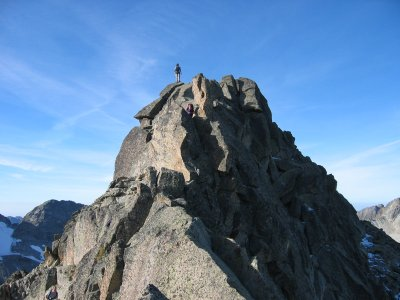
Grand Quayrat summit

== Toponymy ==
Its name in Occitan cairat, meaning "square", comes from the distinctive shape of the summit, roughly forming a right angle, from the north.

== History ==
The Grand Quayrat became the second climbed three thousander in 1789, ascended by physician Henri Reboul, leading an expedition from the barnes of Astau.
