= Pyreneanism =

Sport and art movement of the 19th century

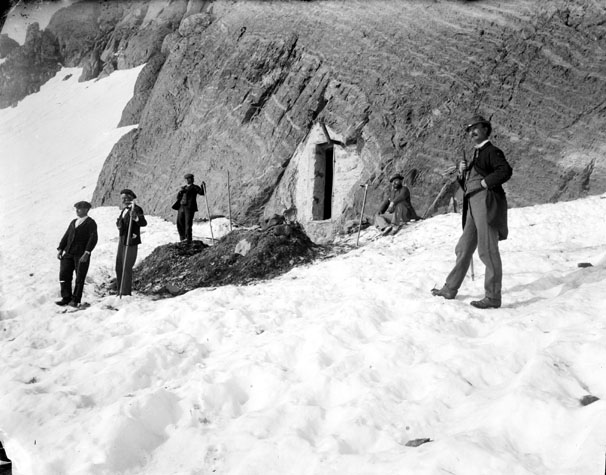
Count Henry Russell (foreground) and Léonce Lourde-Rocheblave, seated near the entrance of the Russell Caves at the Vignemale, accompanied by their guides.

Pyreneanism (French: pyrénéisme; alternatively Pyreneism) is a 19th-century sporting culture as well as an artistic and literary movement centered around exploring the Pyrenees in order to create works inspired by the experience, whether for contemplative, artistic, or scientific purposes. The term was coined in 1898 by the scholar Henri Beraldi in his book Cent ans aux Pyrénées (transl. A Hundred Years in the Pyrenees), where he described a specific way of engaging with the Pyrenean mountains. According to his definition, "the ideal Pyreneist knows how to climb, write, and feel," setting them apart from the typical mountaineer through a more intellectual approach that goes beyond mere physical performance.

The Pyreneist movement is generally considered to have begun with the publication of Louis Ramond de Carbonnières's Observations faites dans les Pyrénées (transl. Observations Made in the Pyrenees) in 1789. It reached its golden age in the second half of the 19th century with the generation known as the Pléiade, which included notable figures like Count Henry Russell and geographer Franz Schrader. It was led by a small group of individuals from the social elite (aristocracy and upper bourgeoisie) or the intellectual class, who made significant efforts to bring attention to their unique practice.

Pyreneanism is part of the broader development of the Romantic movement in Europe and the rise of spa tourism in France. It played a major role in the study and promotion of the Pyrenean mountain range, which its practitioners explored in a methodical way. By the turn of the 20th century, as mountaineering shifted toward greater physical commitment and technical difficulty, the distinction between pyreneanism and alpinism began to fade.

The legacy of pyreneanism began to take shape in the early 20th century, particularly through the efforts of Louis Le Bondidier, who founded the Musée pyrénéen de Lourdes. This legacy continues through a tradition of regularly publishing specialized release books and journals dedicated to the phenomenon. Many peaks in the Pyrenees have been named in honor of Pyreneists, some of whom are buried in the Pyrenean cemetery in Gavarnie.

== Definition ==
L'idéal du pyrénéiste est de savoir à la fois ascensionner, écrire, et sentir. S'il écrit sans monter, il ne peut rien. S'il monte sans écrire, il ne laisse rien. Si, montant, il relate sec, il ne laisse rien qu'un document, qui peut être il est vrai de haut intérêt. Si — chose rare — il monte, écrit et sent, si en un mot il est le peintre d'une nature spéciale, le peintre de la montagne, il laisse un vrai livre, admirable.

The ideal of the Pyreneist is to know how to climb, write, and feel. If he writes without climbing, he has nothing to offer. If he climbs without writing, he leaves nothing behind. If, while climbing, he recounts dryly, he leaves behind only a document, which may indeed be of great interest. If—something rare—he climbs, writes, and feels, if, in a word, he is the painter of a unique world, the painter of the mountain, then he leaves behind a true, admirable book.

— Henri Béraldi, Cent ans aux Pyrénées, 1898

=== A romantic vision and elitist practice of the mountains ===
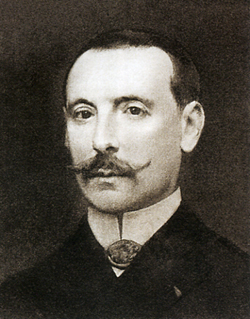
Henri Béraldi coined the term "pyreneanism".

The term "pyreneanism" was coined in 1898 by the memoirist and writer Henri Béraldi in the first volume of his work Cent ans aux Pyrénées (transl. A Hundred Years in the Pyrenees), which traces the history of hikes, ascents, and the touristic discovery of the Pyrenees throughout the 19th century. From the very first pages, the author declares that the Pyreneist ideal is "to know how to climb, write, and feel" all at once.

Historian Étienne Bordes argues that this triptych "sets pyreneanism apart through its grounding in a Romantic sensibility, in the contemplative ethos of discovering the world from above," and brings together a group of men and women who "described, sketched, cataloged, popularized, developed, and at times exploited the Pyrenean massif." According to geographer Xavier Arnauld de Sartre, pyreneanism "seeks to express a form of elective identification with a place and a social group of exceptional longevity ... while also constituting an intense and original sporting, artistic, and publishing activity." Pyreneanism stands apart from spa tourism and resort-based tourism due to the difficulty and risks inherent in its practice.

While pyreneanism shares the same goal as Alpinism, it also includes, according to its advocates, "a passion for discovery, a love of art and science." One of the peculiarities of pyreneanism is that most of its members are not native to the Pyrenees, to the point that Louis Le Bondidier wryly remarked in 1907: "to become a true Pyreneist, it is almost essential not to have been born a Pyrenean. ... The native-born Pyrenean is immune to the Pyreneist bug."

Étienne Bordes explains that the defense and promotion of a specific practice of the Pyrenean mountains "is the subject of a symbolic struggle by its practitioners," who thereby demonstrate their loyalty and attachment to the values and spirit of early alpinism, as described by sociologist Delphine Moraldo. At the turn of the 20th century, while alpinism "was becoming corrupted by an excessive use of muscle, rock-climbing techniques, and brute strength," Pyreneist "sought to preserve a way of engaging with and perceiving the mountain" with an artistic and scientific aim that combines discovery and self-improvement.

This historical definition is the one adopted by Saule-Sorbé in the Dictionnaire des Pyrénées and by the IEC Dictionary of the Catalan Language.

=== A concise definition ===
The term "pyreneanism" is relatively uncommon outside the circle of mountaineers and Pyrenees, and some authors such as Renaud de Bellefon and Paul Bessière believe that the history of this movement is not so different from that of alpinism. In the Dictionnaire des Pyrénées, Renaud de Bellefon describes pyreneanism as a "meaningless catch-all" and he sees it as "an invention with no other true content". Pyreneanism, as defined by Beraldi, concerns "only a narrow fringe of mountain uses and users", while it brings together individuals from several generations whose conceptions may be different, even antagonistic.

Étienne Bordes considers the initial definition of pyreneanism to be reductive, insofar as it assumes that the scholarly and sensitive approach to mountain running is not found in other places. He presents it as "the product of a form of aristocratic ethnocentrism of which Henri Beraldi serves as the scribe".

This second definition is the one used by Trésor de la langue française informatisé and Office québécois de la langue française in French, as well as the Diccionario de la lengua española as published by the Royal Spanish Academy. As of 2024 however, the term is absent from both the Dictionnaires Le Robert and the Grand Larousse encyclopédique. As for the term "alpinisme", it appeared in French in the 1870s and is used generically for any mountain range, despite a few more specific local terms such as Himalayanism and Andinism.

=== Claims of first ascents ===
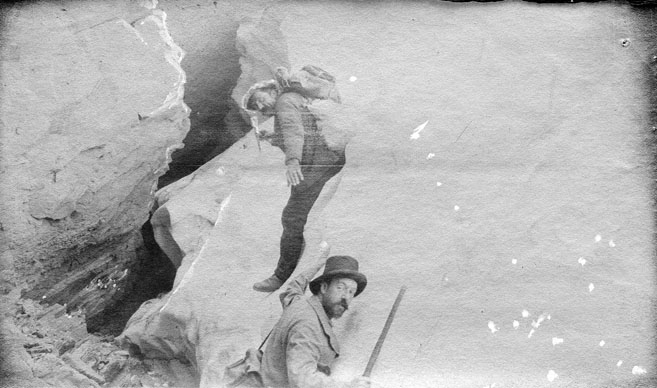
Félix Régnault and guide Henri Passet at the Tuquerouye Escalade, October 1892.

The question of the first ascent has at times been the subject of significant debate, particularly with regard to determining to whom the honor of being first should be attributed.

The very nature of the Pyrenees—an average-altitude mountain range largely devoid of glaciated areas—makes most of its summits easily accessible, and the range's passes have been important for transport for many centuries. Used since the Neolithic period by herds and their shepherds, and later by customs officers, smugglers, peddlers, and soldiers, the Pyrenees and their passes have recorded "constant flows of travelers". From the sixteenth to the eighteenth century, routes were developed to facilitate the transport of goods or materials, such as at the Venasque Pass or the Pez Pass, but most mountain paths were only roughly marked with cairns, and detailed knowledge of them was limited to a small number of initiates.

This utilitarian use of the mountains sometimes led such travelers to ascend the summits, with the result that later claims of first ascents by Pyreneists can be called into question. For example, when Charles Packe reached the summit of Balaïtous in 1864, he discovered a man-made signal turret: it was the work of the geodetic officers Pierre Peytier and Paul-Michel Hossard who had climbed the mountain in 1825 during a triangulation mission of the border region.

According to Étienne Bordes, this achievement fell into obscurity for several decades because of its utilitarian purpose and the absence of any literary communication: thus, "physical effort only fully counts when accompanied by literary intellectualization." As a result, the first ascent is sometimes attributed to the individual who claims it and asserts it through the publication of books or articles, so that the tourist-writer and Pyreneist is recognized as its originator rather than the guides who led the way or the shepherds who left no trace other than a few stones at the summit.

== History ==
The history of Pyrenean mountaineering spans a little over a hundred years. It begins at the end of the eighteenth century, when the Pyrenees started to benefit from the development of modern spa tourism and the construction of new road networks that enabled the region to attract more affluent visitors, and it ends at the beginning of the twentieth century, when new mountain practices emerged, such as skiing or the pursuit of ascents defined by technical difficulty. Between these two eras, nineteenth-century Pyrenean mountaineering was shaped by a small, distinctly elite group of individuals drawn largely from aristocratic and bourgeois circles, who distinguished themselves through the efforts they made to promote and legitimize their activity. Lower than the Alps, with summits that were relatively easy to access and in some cases already frequented, the Pyrenees were perceived as a subordinate mountain range, a "secondary space within the European landscape" of alpinism. As a result, these practitioners sought to justify their sustained engagement with the range by emphasizing forms of appeal other than the mere conquest of high peaks.

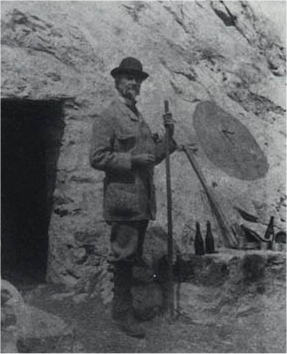
Henry Russell in front of the entrance to one of the Russell Caves.

Although the memoirist Henri Beraldi was the first, at the turn of the twentieth century, to compile an inventory of these figures of nineteenth-century Pyrenean mountaineering, it was the Pyreneist themselves who, through their abundant literary output, constructed the history of their own group. In 2024, Étienne Bordes undertook the first "collective biography of Pyreneist," intended to "outline the contours of this elite of ascent in order to distinguish Pyrenean mountaineers from other mountain users."

In Cent ans aux Pyrénées, Beraldi distinguishes three periods in the history of pyreneanism: an early phase represented by Louis Ramond de Carbonnières, a French politician, geologist and botanist; a middle age associated with Vincent de Chausenque, a former topographer; and a modern era embodied by Henry Russell, an explorer known for his obsession with the Vignemale. A century later, the historian Étienne Bordes retains this tripartite framework while shifting its chronological boundaries. He instead brings together the first two ages identified by Beraldi, describing these early explorers of the massif—active between the late eighteenth century and the mid-nineteenth century—as pioneers. He then distinguishes the representatives of the golden age of pyreneanism in the second half of the nineteenth century, those whom Beraldi grouped under the term Pléiade, describing those mountaineers toward the end of the nineteenth century, who turned to a form of mountaineering focused on difficulty and less marked by literary expression than by physical or technical achievement.

=== The first Pyreneists (1780s–1840s) ===
Les Pyrénées n'existent que depuis cent ans. Elles sont « modernes ». Les Pyrénées ont été inventées par Ramond.

The Pyrenees have existed for only a hundred years. They are "modern". The Pyrenees were invented by Ramond.

— Henri Béraldi, Cent ans aux Pyrénées, 1898

According to Étienne Bordes, "the first generation of Pyreneist inaugurates and experiments with the new representations and practices of the mountain that flourished among European elites at the end of the eighteenth century. Its members combine discovery, ascent, and writing by importing into the Pyrenees the emerging norms of European alpinism." However, for this first generation, there was as yet no distinct Pyrenean consciousness or genuine specificity attached to the exploration of this massif. The Pyrenean experience was merely one stage within a broader itinerary, even for Louis Ramond de Carbonnières, often regarded as "the inventor of the Pyrenees", as he published his Observations sur les Alpes in 1777, a decade before his first stay in the Pyrenees.

In general, these early Pyrenean mountaineers were not concerned with systematically exploring the Pyrenean range: only Louis Ramond de Carbonnières and Vincent de Chausenque undertook multiple ascents and committed themselves to the sustained discovery of the Pyrenees. For other members of this group, the Pyrenean experience rarely extended beyond a scientifically motivated stay or "a single major initiatory climb", carried out with experienced guides. Yet their literary output, as well as their social profile, was sufficient to distinguish them from the "casual visits of a tourist-spa public, who were content with more modest and well-marked ascents."

Étienne Bordes identifies around thirty individuals who can be grouped within this first generation of Pyreneist, the majority of whom were aristocrats—whether members of the minor nobility of the Ancien régime and the First Empire or of the high French and European aristocracy. Examples include Prince Louis, Duke of Nemours, who made the first ascent of Pic Long in 1846, and Napoléon Joseph Ney, Prince of the Moskowa, who completed the second ascent of the Vignemale in 1838. Other members of this informal group also held prominent positions in society due to their political roles or professions, including high-ranking civil servants, military officers, or those in careers requiring advanced education. The vast majority of these early Pyreneist came from an urban, largely literate background. With the exception of Anne Lister, Britons were absent from this group, largely because the Pyrenean summits did not meet the Alpine Club's 13,000-foot (3,965-meter) threshold for membership. Likewise, local elites were largely absent, with only four members born in a department neighboring the range. In this context, the rivalry between Armand d'Angosse and Henri d'Augerot to be the first Béarnais to reach the summit of Pic du Midi d'Ossau is noteworthy; the prestige of such a conquest was intertwined with economic and political competition between their families.

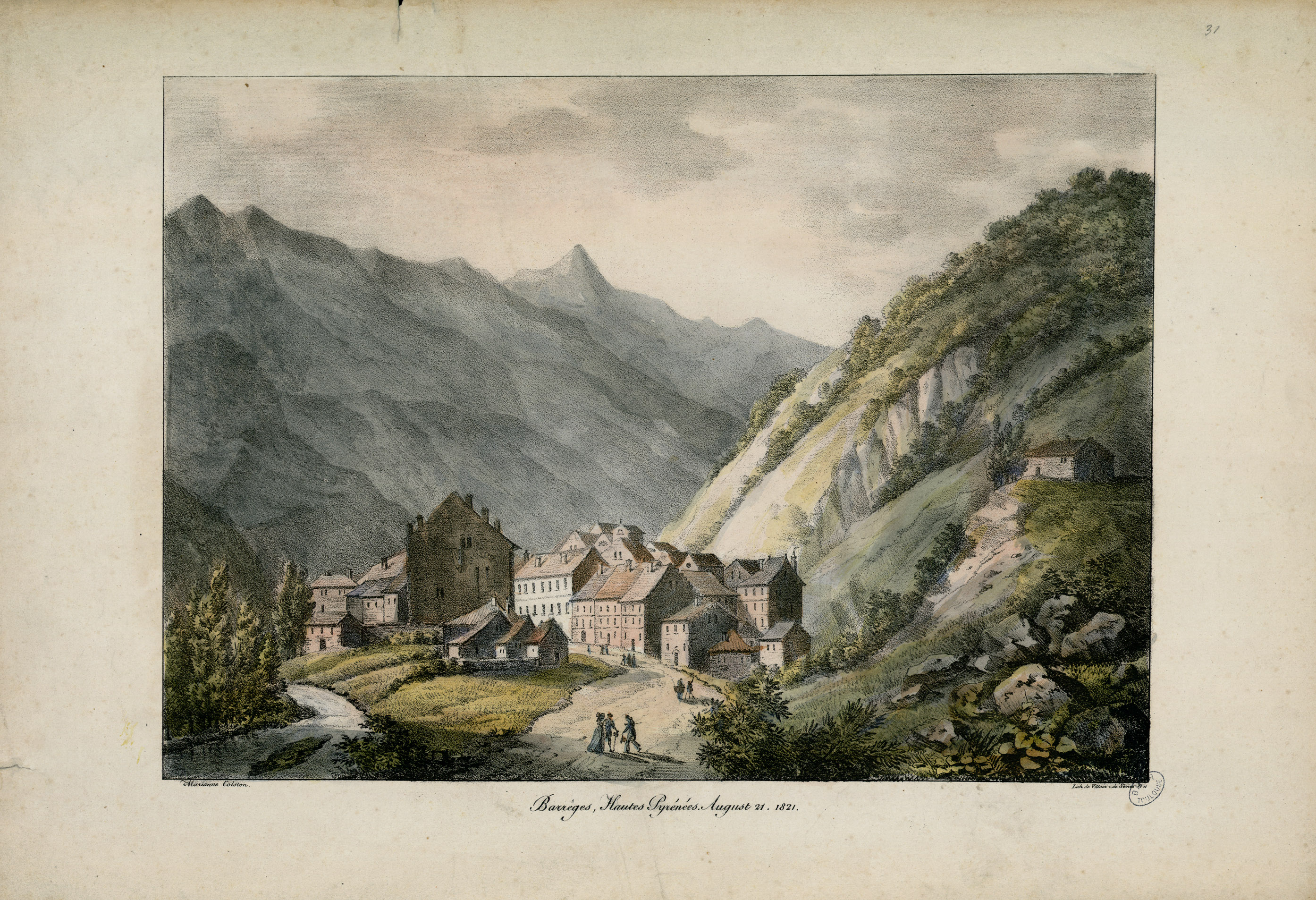
View of Barèges in 1821 by Marianne Colston.

Thus, "by virtue of his birthplace far from the range, his social background, education, profession, and political and scientific roles," Louis Ramond de Carbonnières represents, according to many authors, "the ideal type of this generation." He discovered the Pyrenees during a summer stay in Barèges in 1787. This first visit inspired the writing of Observations faites dans les Pyrénées, published in the spring of 1789. He would be elected deputy of Paris in 1791 and then take refuge in the Pyrenees the following year to escape the Reign of Terror. From that point on, he undertook a program of systematic exploration of the range, while also teaching at the École centrale in Tarbes from 1796 to 1800. His studies spanned numerous fields, including geology, natural history, botany, and ethnology. Notably, he reached the summit of Mont Perdu in 1802. Appointed prefect of Puy-de-Dôme in 1806, he settled in Auvergne and continued his research in the Massif Central. By combining literature and the sciences, the Enlightenment philosophy, and the Romantic spirit, Louis Ramond de Carbonnières adopted in the Pyrenees the same approach as the naturalist Horace-Bénédict de Saussure did in the Mont Blanc massif.

Several first-generation Pyreneist corresponded with Ramond and shared some of his base camps (such as Barèges, Bagnères-de-Bigorre, or Cauterets) including naturalists Jean Florimond Boudon de Saint-Amans and Léon Jean Marie Dufour, as well as the geologist Henri Reboul, who identified Aneto as the highest point of the range. Other scientists, such as François Pasumot, Jean de Charpentier, and Pierre Cordier, explored the Pyrenees after working in the Alps, seeking to understand the massif's geological structure.

In 1825, Pierre-Toussaint de la Boulinière, Secretary-General of the Prefecture of Hautes-Pyrénées, published Itinéraire descriptif et pittoresque des Hautes-Pyrénées françaises (transl. Descriptive and picturesque itinerary of the French Hautes-Pyrénées) following a survey of his department, which can be considered the first guidebook for the heart of the massif. A few years earlier, in 1807, the Swiss botanist Augustin Pyramus de Candolle conducted an east-to-west traverse to catalogue Pyrenean flora. This journey, along with that of the naturalist Friedrich Parrot ten years later, represents one of the earliest documented examples of itinerant hiking across the range.

According to Étienne Bordes, the career of Vincent de Chausenque "illustrates the first example of a long-term commitment to the Pyrenees and one of the earliest instances of a fully conscious desire for exploration and summit conquest." Like Ramond, whom he would meet a few years later, Chausenque first encountered the Pyrenees during a spa stay in 1804. Four years later, he left the army in order to devote himself entirely to mountain exploration. He settled permanently in the Pyrenees in 1822 and completed numerous first ascents, including Pic de Ger in 1829 and Pic de Néouvielle in 1847. In 1834, he published Les Pyrénées ou voyages pédestres dans toutes les régions de ces montagnes, a work that would serve as a guide for many subsequent Pyreneist.

The conquest of unclimbed Pyrenean peaks attracted a growing number of climbers who sought out the best guides to claim the glory of the first ascent. Beyond the physical feat, literary publication played a major role in establishing the primacy of the conquest. In this respect, Anne Lister's summiting of Vignemale is an example. During the summer of 1838, Lister—the first woman to reach the summit of Mont Perdu in 1830—wanted to be the first tourist to climb Vignemale. She surrounded herself with guides Jean-Pierre Charles, Jean-Pierre Sajous, Bernard Guilhambet, and Henri Cazaux. The latter two, having scouted the route the previous summer, sought to sell the exclusive rights to the conquest to the highest bidder. On 7 August, the Lister expedition reached the Pic Long, the highest point in the French Pyrenees. But exclusive access to the summit was also promised to Napoléon Joseph Ney, Prince of the Moskowa, a prestigious client. On 11 August, accompanied by the same Cazaux and Guilhambet, he reached Vignemale, where the guides had erased all trace of Anne Lister's passage. In the following days, the Prince of the Moskowa published an account of his ascent in Revue des Deux Mondes. Upon learning of the deception, Anne Lister had her guides sign a certificate attesting to her primacy of the ascent, but the impact of the literary publication, as well as the sudden death of the English explorer two years later, left the identity of the true conqueror of Vignemale ambiguous for a long time.

On 20 July 20, 1842, Aneto, the highest point of the range, was conquered by the then-former Russian soldier Platon Tchikhatchov and the French botanist Albert Belhomme de Franqueville, accompanied by the guides Pierre Sanio, Pierre Redonnet, Jean Sors and Bernard Arrazau.

=== The "Pléiade" (1850s–1880s) ===
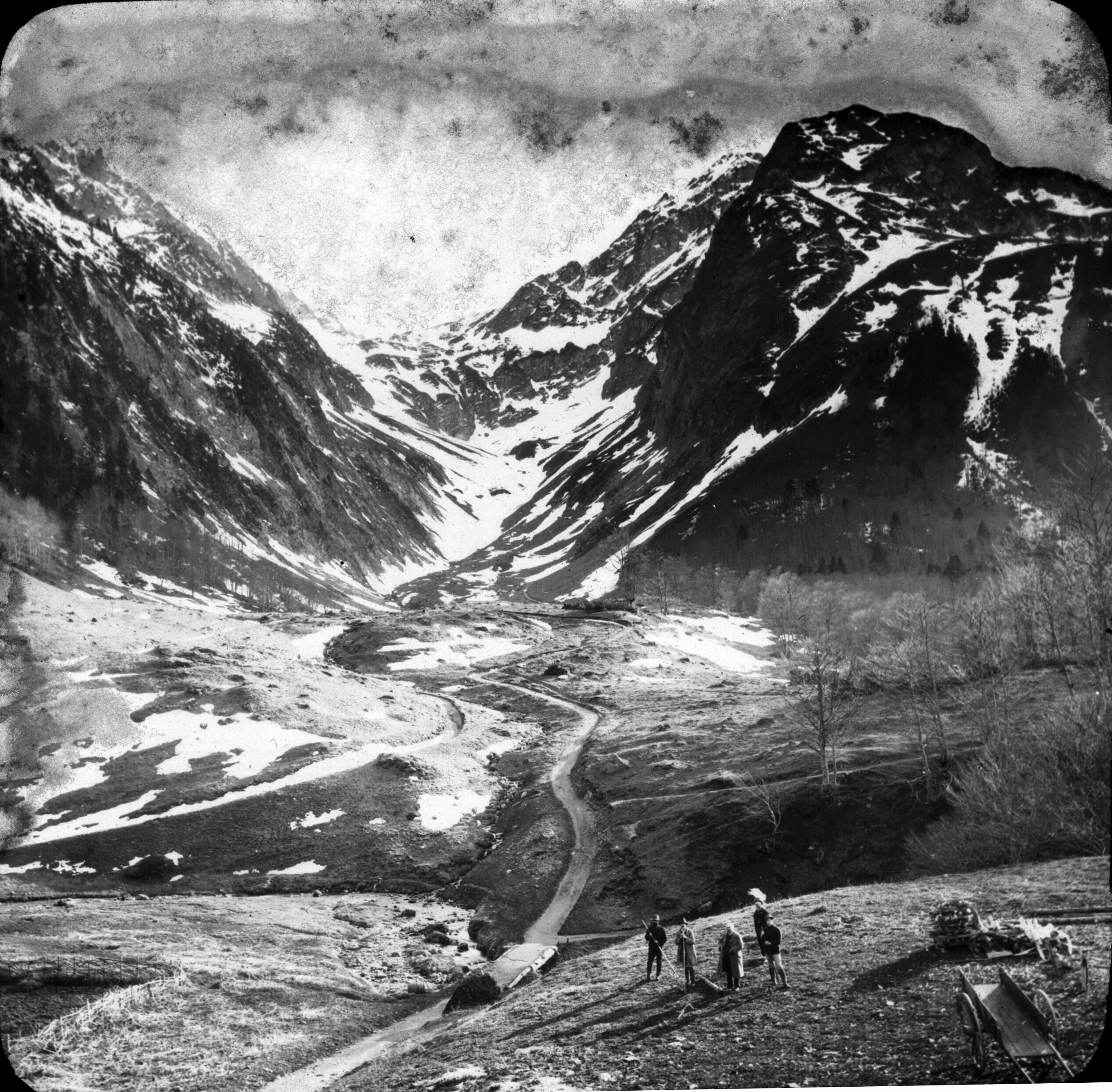
Pyreneist on a route in Port de Venasque, Luchon (1875), near the France–Spain border.

Henri Beraldi retrospectively gave the name "Pléiade" to the second generation of Pyreneist who, according to Étienne Bordes, "undertook a codification process, established a grammar of ascent, wrote, and created, through the founding of journals and associations, a means of regulating the emergence of a quasi-professional practice". Bordes summarized the ethos of this group with four terms: walking, exploring, knowing, and sharing. The Pyrenean mountaineers of the Pléiade, who sought to promote a specific practice of the Pyrenean mountains, systematized and intensified their explorations, valuing "both endurance and physical excellence, a certain spirit of discovery and adventure, a desire to know things and people, and an endeavor to share through writing and through the places of these experiences".

Under this designation, Beraldi brings together a group of individuals centered around seven learned mountain enthusiasts of the mid-nineteenth century: Henry Russell, Alphonse Lequeutre, Paul Édouard Wallon, Franz Schrader, Maurice Gourdon, Aymar de Saint-Saud, and Ferdinand Prudent. Like those of the previous generation, the members of the Pléiade belonged to the same elite social world, but its center of gravity shifted from the aristocracy to the bourgeoisie established in the towns of southwestern France, so that pyreneanism in the second half of the 19th century was more the domain of a local or regional elite. Although they represented only 2.2% of the French population in 1866, Protestants were overrepresented within this intellectual and cultured bourgeois elite, as exemplified by the pastor Émilien Frossard, the geographer Franz Schrader, and the engineer and politician Adrien Bayssellance. Representatives of the aristocracy, though fewer in number, continued to hold influential positions and brought their class practices to the mountains, as demonstrated by Russell, who held lavish receptions at nearly 3,000 meters altitude in caves he had built on the slopes of Vignemale.

Even more so than for the previous generation, conquering high peaks was a priority for the members of the Pléiade, who displayed exceptional physical abilities: Henry Russell's record in this regard is considerable, with some thirty first ascents. Furthermore, the Pyrenean mountaineers of the Pléiade systematized multi-day treks and did not hesitate to stay at altitude, even spending the night on summits, so that the ascent of a peak was sometimes only one episode of a long high-altitude journey. Unlike their predecessors, who concentrated on the mountains around the major thermal spas, they now ventured into long-deserted areas such as the massifs in Ariège, the Posets massif, and the sierras in Aragon.

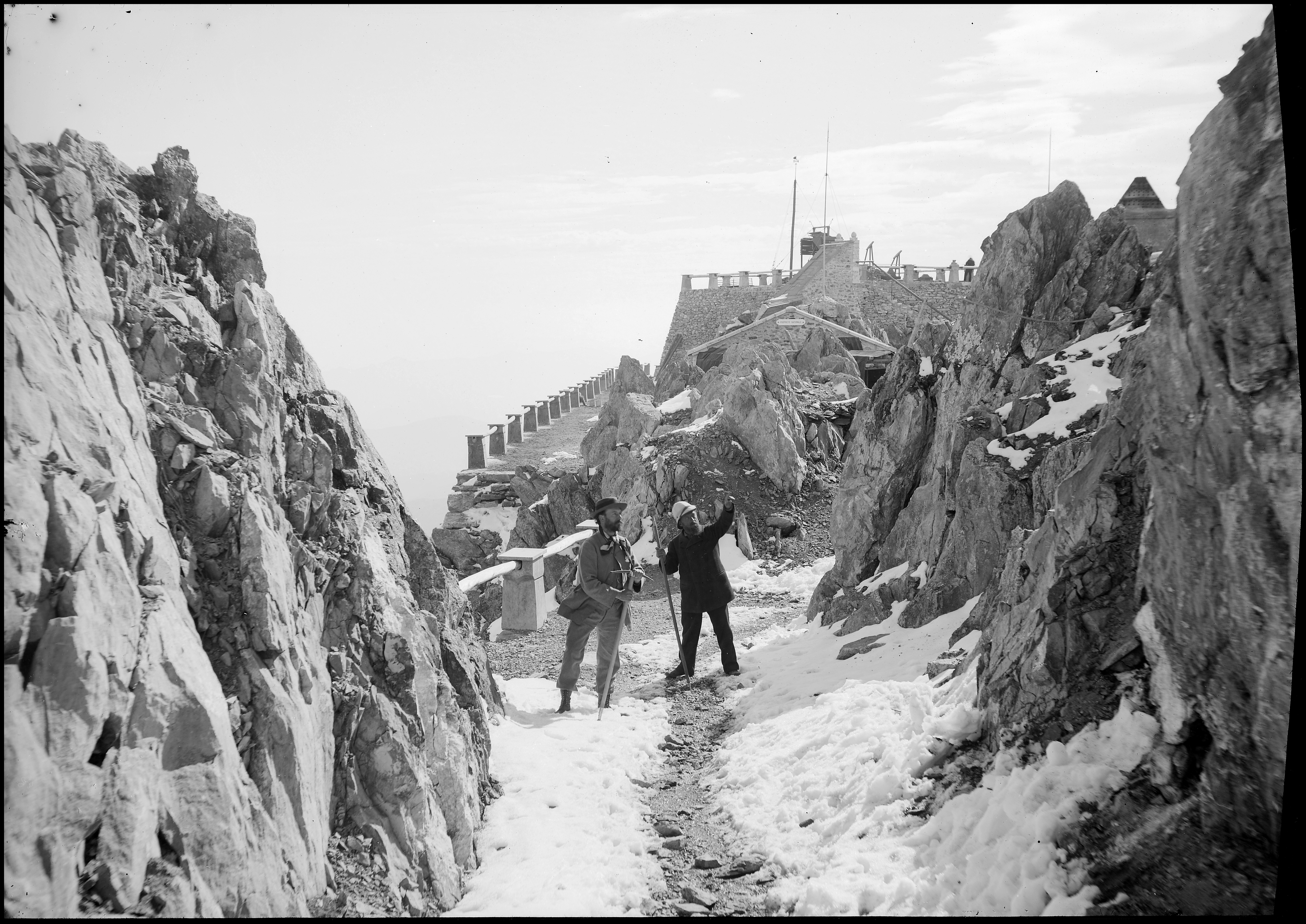
Two men stand outside the entrance to the Pic du Midi Observatory (date unknown), founded by Vaussenat and General de Nansouty.

With the exception of Russell, for whom mountaineering was more contemplative, the climbers worked for a scientific purpose. For example, Franz Schrader, inventor of the orograph, mapped the cartography of the range, a task also undertaken by Toussaint Lézat in Luchonnais, the mountains of the Luchon; Maurice Gourdon developed a passion for archaeology and the study of the cromlechs of the Pla de Beret; Émile Belloc studied hydrology and the Pyrenean lakes; Émile Jeanbernat continued the botanical exploration of the range; and General de Nansouty and Célestin-Xavier Vaussenat devoted themselves to the creation of the observatory on the Pic du Midi de Bigorre.

For the Pyreneist of the Pléiade, the mountain adventure was coupled with an institutional adventure: founded in 1864 on the model of the British Alpine Club, the Société Ramond aimed to promote the scientific study of the mountain range in all its aspects, and brought together the main players of the period. It represented the first step toward the construction of a collective memory, reinforced by the annual publication of the society's bulletin, which functioned as an "official organ and a space for group communication". Pyreneist were also heavily involved in the development of the French Alpine Club (CAF), founded in 1874, with nearly 25% of the articles in the club's yearbook devoted to the Pyrenees between 1875 and 1885. The first Pyrenean sections of the CAF were created in 1876, and Franz Schrader served as club president from 1901 to 1904. Accounts of ascents constituted the largest share of articles published by Pyreneist, to the point that some of them, such as Henry Russell, edited a compilation, but the sharing also took place through the writing of tourist guides.

Paradoxically, Pyreneanist publications led to increased visitation of the massif as well as a greater understanding of its geography. At the same time, the systematic exploration of the range reduced the number of unclimbed summits, so that the focus of Pyrenean excellence gradually shifted toward other criteria. The first ascent of Vignemale via the Gaube couloir, undertaken on 7 August 1889, by Henri Brulle, Jean Bazillac, Roger de Monts, and their guides Célestin Passet and François Bernat-Salles, marked a crucial step in the emergence of challenging Pyrenean mountaineering. According to Étienne Bordes, this approach made it possible "to maintain a symbolic gap between the mass of tourists... and the members of the mountaineering elite."

=== Pyreneanism of difficulty (1880s–2000s) ===
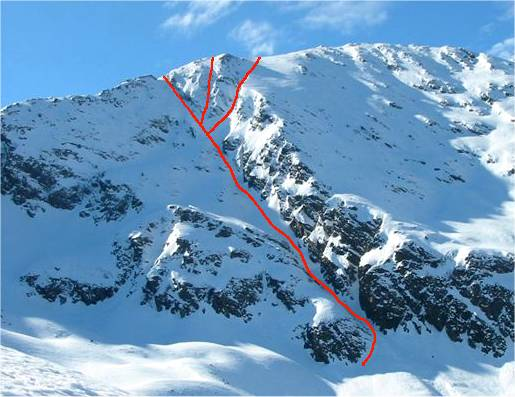
The access routes at the top of the Pique d'Endron by the Endron slot.

At the end of the 19th century, as physical and technical difficulty of the routes Pyrenean became the new standards of mountaineering excellence, great climbers gradually turned away from the Pyrenees in favor of the Alps, but also of extra-European massifs such as the Andes. The Pyrenees lost their distinctiveness and became just one playground among many: men like Henri Brulle, Jean Bazillac and René d'Astorg accomplished many of their feats in the Alps, in addition to their Pyrenean expeditions. At the same time, the reforms of higher education initiated by Victor Duruy and Louis Liard institutionalized scientific research within universities, making it inaccessible to the "dilettantes" that the leading figures of the Pléiade might have been. Consequently, few Pyreneists at the end of the 19th century reported scientific activities and publications, with the exception of the geographer Maurice Heïd, the cartographer Aymar de Saint-Saud, and the abbé Ludovic Gaurier, who continued the study of Pyrenean lakes and chasms. As Étienne Bordes points out, "the writings of Pyreneist of this period break with the heroic genre of adventure narrative so prevalent in the previous generation: the account becomes more specific, more technical." Mountain experience tends to align itself with purely physical criteria, and few stand out more for their exploits than for their writings, as demonstrated by the memoirist Henri Beraldi.

The end of the 19th century was thus marked by a growing fascination with the most inaccessible routes and summits, while the winter practice of ascents became increasingly systematized. Ski mountaineering developed under the impetus of Louis Robach and Louis Falisse, who on 4 April 1904 carried out the first ski ascent of Aneto together with Maurice Heïd. Other Pyreneists such as husband and wife Margalide and Louis Le Bondidier encouraged the development of this practice and, through the efforts of these pioneers, local elected officials, and the Touring Club de France, the first permanent facilities were established: the resorts of Superbagnères in Luchon and Font-Romeu in Font-Romeu both opened between 1912 and 1913.

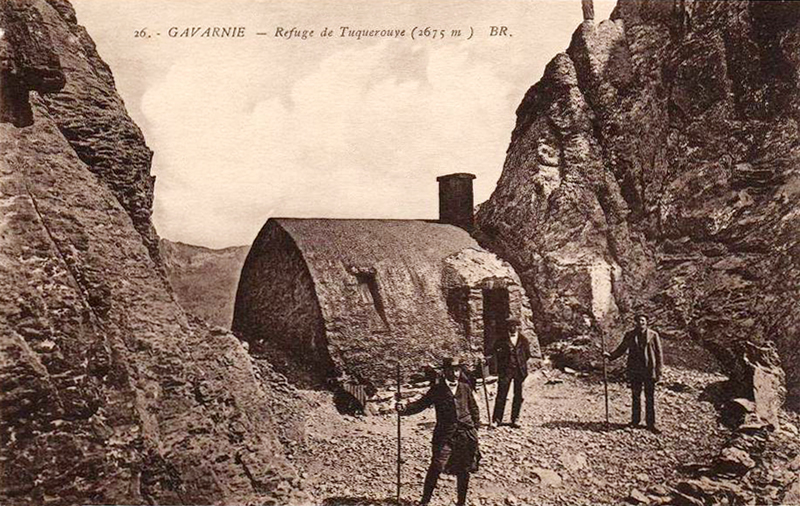
The Tuquerouye refuge near Gavarnie at the beginning of the 20th century.

At the same time, following the long stays at altitude promoted by Henry Russell, multi-day treks developed, and several Pyreneists undertook complete traverses of the range, such as the British writer Harold Spender or the Haute-Garonne deputy Jean Bepmale. The Cadier brothers undertook an unprecedented linked-ascent of the Pyrenean three-thousanders during the summers of 1902 and 1903. Under the impetus of the French Alpine Club, accommodations were developed, such as the Tuquerouye refuge, designed by Léonce Lourde-Rocheblave and inaugurated in 1890, the Packe refuge in 1895, and the Bayssellance refuge in 1899.

=== Catalan Pyreneanism ===
Although it remained largely bourgeois, the third generation of Pyreneist was composed mainly of people living in the immediate vicinity of the range. One of the significant developments of this period was the emergence of a large number of Spaniards within the previously closed circle of Pyreneist. Until then, the notion of Pyreneanism had been almost exclusively French, owing to the relative isolation of the high Spanish valleys, which made them difficult for inhabitants of the southern foothills to access. Tourist facilities were scarce, the railway did not venture into these areas, and major roads were not opened until the 1910s and 1920s.

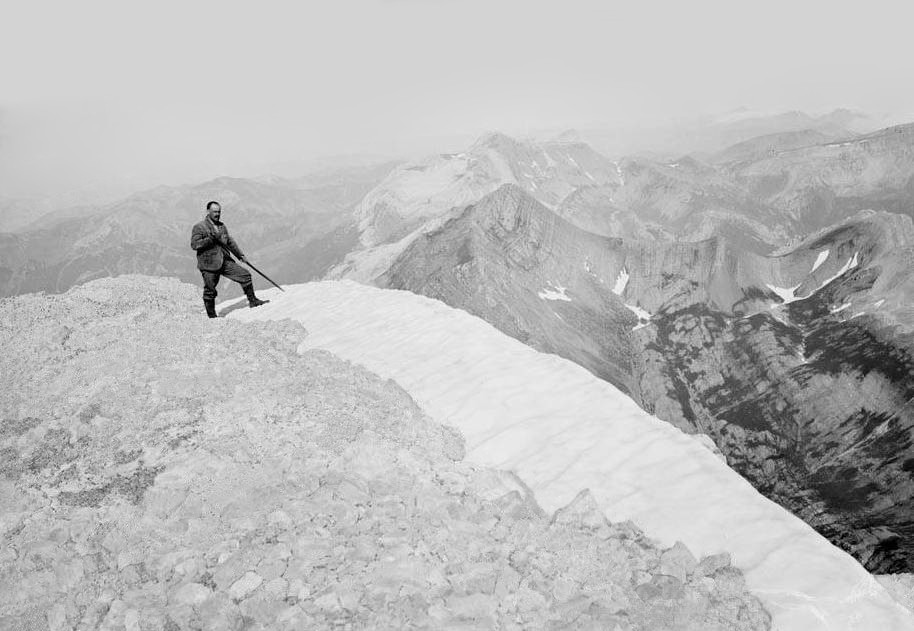
Juli Soler i Santaló at the summit of Bisaurín in 1910.

But at the end of the 1870s, Spanish Pyreneism took off in the wake of the Catalan Renaixença, driven by a young and educated elite, mostly from the bourgeoisie and from Barcelona. Several of them, such as the poet Jacint Verdaguer, the engineer and photographer Juli Soler i Santaló, and the folklorist Ramón Arabía y Solanas, set out to explore the high Pyrenean valleys in order to raise awareness of the architectural, linguistic, cultural, and natural heritage of the Catalan nation: "the rebirth of the nation passes through a rediscovery of its roots, idealized in this conservatory of an original Catalan identity, of a patriotic state of nature that would have endured in high valleys sheltered, by distance and altitude, from Mediterranean mixing or major invasions." The Hiking Club of Catalonia, founded in 1891, brought together these Catalan mountaineers and quickly equipped itself, like its French counterparts, with a sporting branch oriented toward technically demanding Pyreneanism. It also contributed to the improvement of the cartography of the Spanish Pyrenees and to the construction of the first refuges, such as the Renclusa Refuge at the foot of the Macizo de la Maladeta in 1916.

=== 20th century: the Pyrenees after the Pyreneist ===
The 20th century opened with the increasing democratization of the Pyrenean peaks. Through the publication of their accounts, their cartographic work, and the development of mountain huts, the Pyreneist "contributed to the development of tourism in the Pyrenean space," which was now accessible to a wider audience. Practitioners of Pyrenean mountaineering no longer claimed a distinct identity, but instead evolved "within a national and international space of alpinism that was then undergoing rapid expansion and increasing complexity." Two prominent figures born in the last years of the 19th century, Jean Arlaud and Raymond d'Espouy, continued this work of democratization while remaining faithful to the ethics of the great Pyreneist: they founded the "Groupe des jeunes" (transl. Young People's Group) which helped broaden the social base of climbers.

Several figures in 20th-century mountaineering came from the Pyrenees, such as Robert Ollivier, one of the first state-certified guides in 1938, founder of the Groupe pyrénéiste de haute montagne (GPHM; lit. transl. high mountain Pyrenean group) with brothers Jean and Pierre Ravier, or Louis Audoubert. Despite the name of the GPHM and the fact that it was founded in a symbolic location of Pyrenean mountaineering (the Hôtel de Voyageurs in Gavarnie), they were not considered Pyreneist insofar as their exploits extend across different mountain ranges around the world: for the historian Étienne Bordes, "it is probably no longer really a question of Pyreneist but of Pyreneans, trained and starting out in the massif before going elsewhere to achieve excellence". The Ravier brothers nevertheless contributed to knowledge of the range and opened numerous expert routes by carrying out first ascents during the 1950s and 1960s, such as the classic north face of Piton Carré in the Vignemale massif, also known as the "Ravier route", in 1954, or the winter traverse of the three ridges of Balaïtous.

The emergence of multi-day hiking in the Pyrenees also stems from Pyreneanism: the GR 10 (a long-distance hiking trail in the GR footpath network) was developed primarily in the 1960s, and the Haute Randonnée Pyrénéenne, an unmarked high-mountain route, was created in 1968 by Georges Véron, Jean-Pierre Neau, and Claude Major.

== Legacy ==
=== Among mountaineers ===
Between 1898 and 1904, Henri Beraldi, a high-ranking Parisian civil servant, bibliophile, and lover of the Pyrenees, which he frequented almost every summer in Bagnères-de-Luchon, undertook the writing of Cent ans aux Pyrénées (transl. A Hundred Years in the Pyrenees), a work that constitutes a normative compilation of the Pyreneanist elite. This work is part of a movement of romantic nostalgia that views a return to nature as an escape "from urban or state integration", in the words of the historian Étienne Bordes. In other words, confronted with the diversification of mountain activities, their growing social openness, and the increasing number of participants, Cent ans aux Pyrénées conveys the nostalgia for a vanished golden age, and the author's regret for a time "when the Pyrenees were only the playground of people of his class".

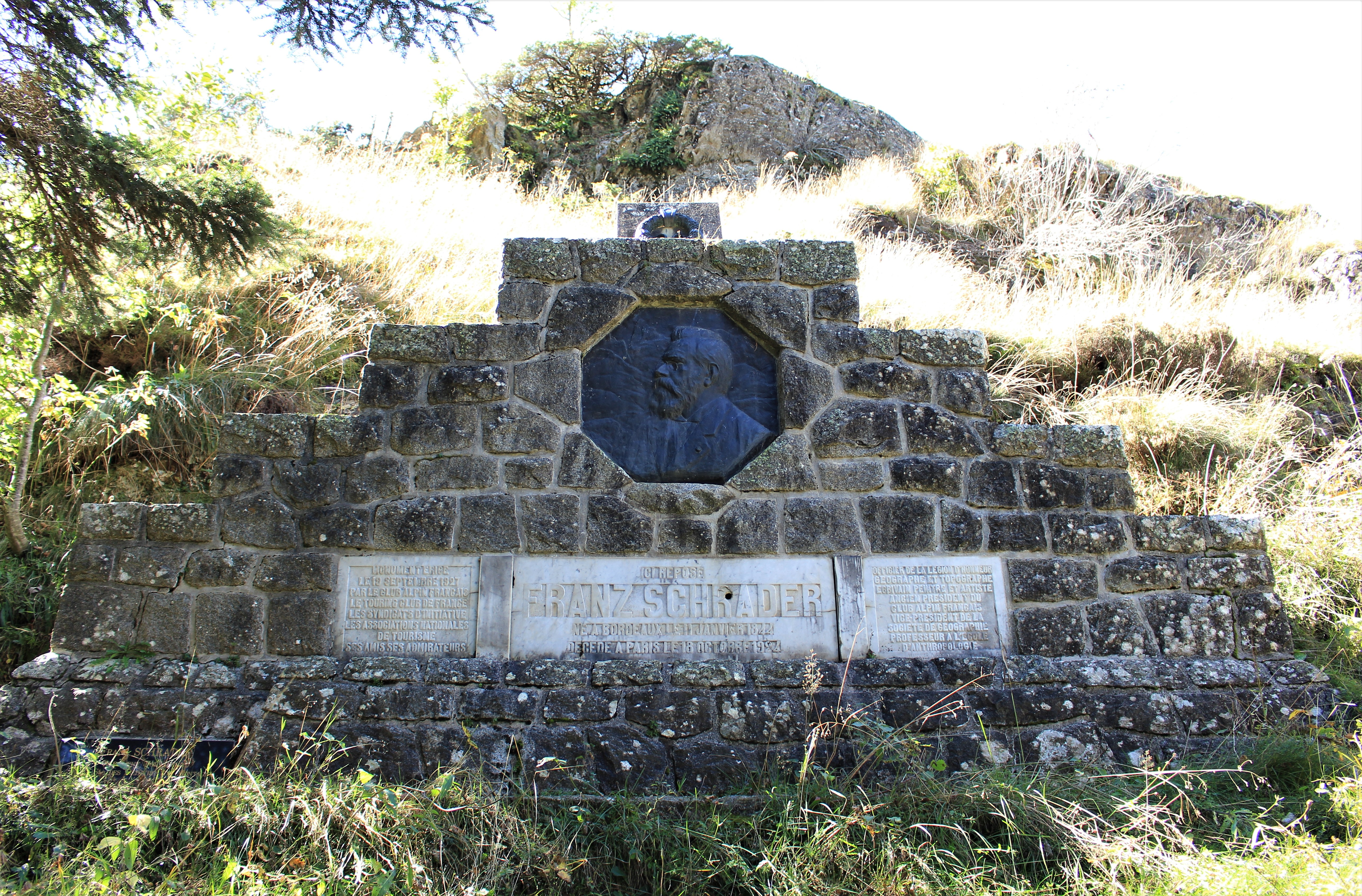
Monument to Franz Schrader in Gavarnie.

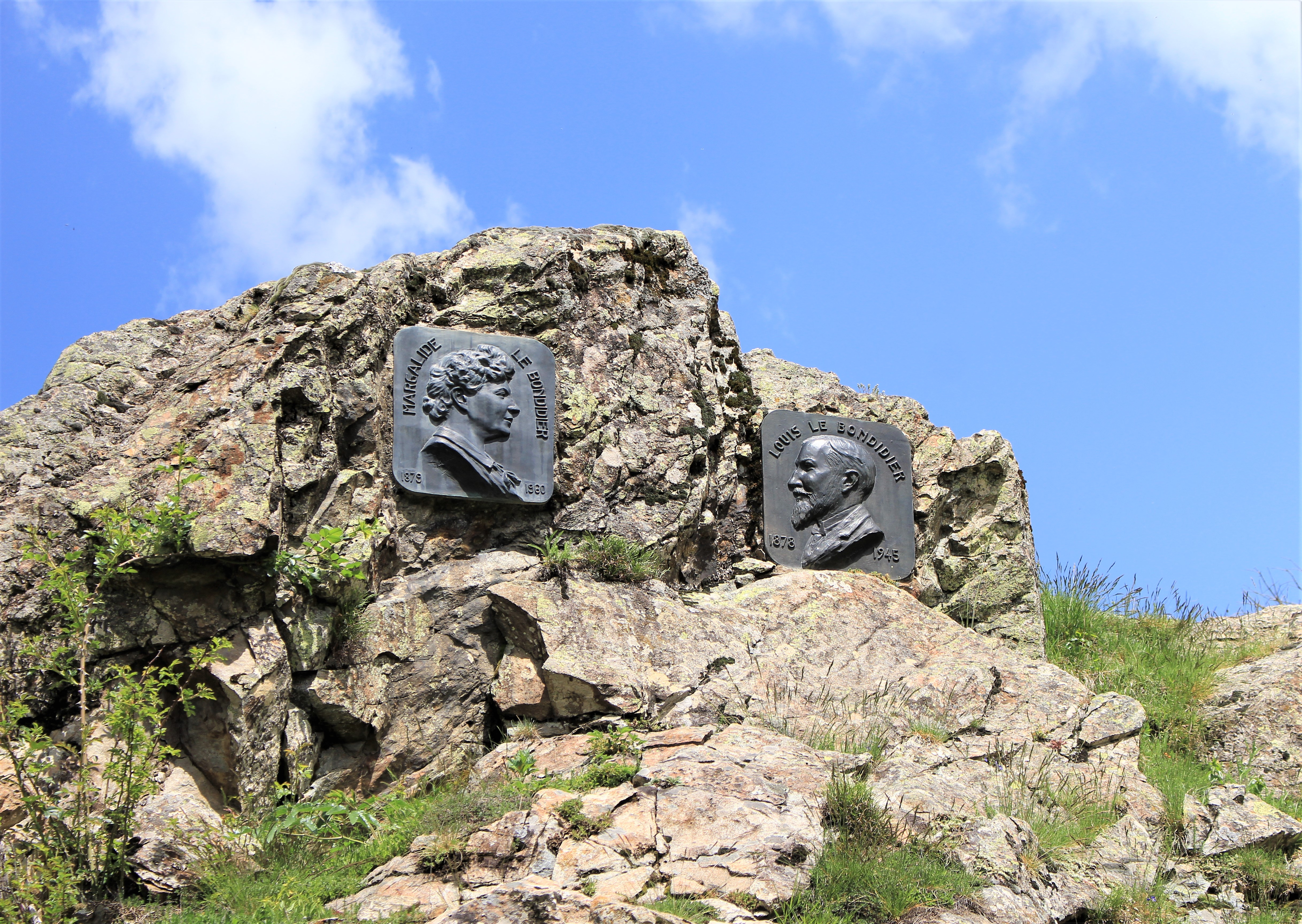
Monuments to Margalide and Louis Le Bondidier.

Until the end of his life, Henri Beraldi continued his campaign to promote Pyreneanism. After the First World War he was joined by Louis Le Bondidier, who founded the Pyrenean Museum in Lourdes in 1921. The Pyrenees contain numerous monuments or markers associated with Pyreneanism, including graves, statues, or commemorative plaques. As early as 1911, a bronze statue of Henry Russell, created by the Bordeaux sculptor Gaston Leroux, was erected at the entrance to Gavarnie. In the same village, thanks to the initiative of Le Bondidier, a Pyreneanist section was laid out at the heart of the Gavarnie cemetery facing the Cirque de Gavarnie during the 1920s through the 1930s. It contains the graves of several major figures of the movement such as Georges Ledormeur, Jean Arlaud, and Raymond d'Espouy, as well as those of the guides of the Passet family and François Bernat-Salles. At the foot of the cirque there is also the funerary monument to Franz Schrader, at a place known as Turon de la Courade, where the geographer was buried on 19 September 1927 (nearly three years after his death) very close to the monument to Margalide and Louis Le Bondidier.

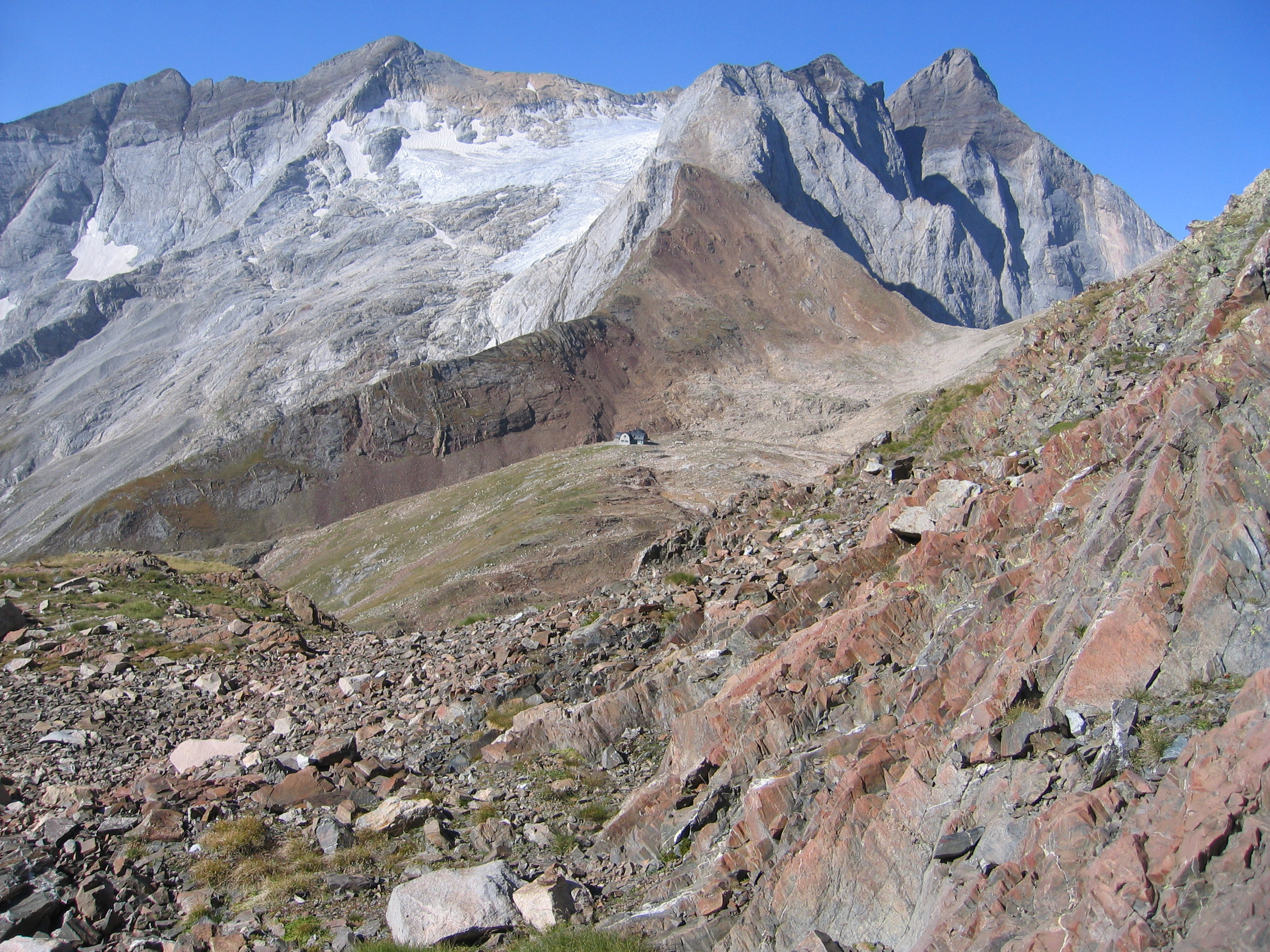
The Bayssellance Refuge (shown in 2007) is named for the French engineer and explorer (1829-1907).

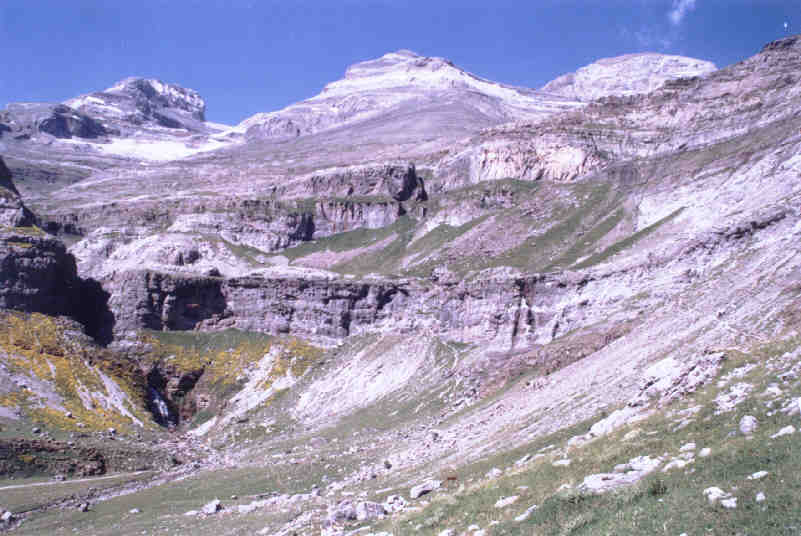
The Soum de Ramond (photo right), in the Mont Perdu massif in Spain

The practice of naming peaks after Pyrenean mountaineers, as a tribute from their peers, increased sharply during the 19th century: Soum de Ramond, Pic Brulle, Pic Schrader, Pic Russell, Pointe Ledormeur, the Moskowa Couloir in Vignemale, and the Bayssellance Refuge are just a few examples. This practice also fulfilled a practical necessity: in the 19th century, many peaks still lacked specific names, a fact lamented by some geographers seeking ever greater precision. The names given by Pyreneists were immediately recognized by alpine clubs and on maps, but they could sometimes lead to conflicts. In 2020, the Aragonese government renamed 61 peaks within its territory, restoring their traditional names; this unilateral decision was not recognized by France.

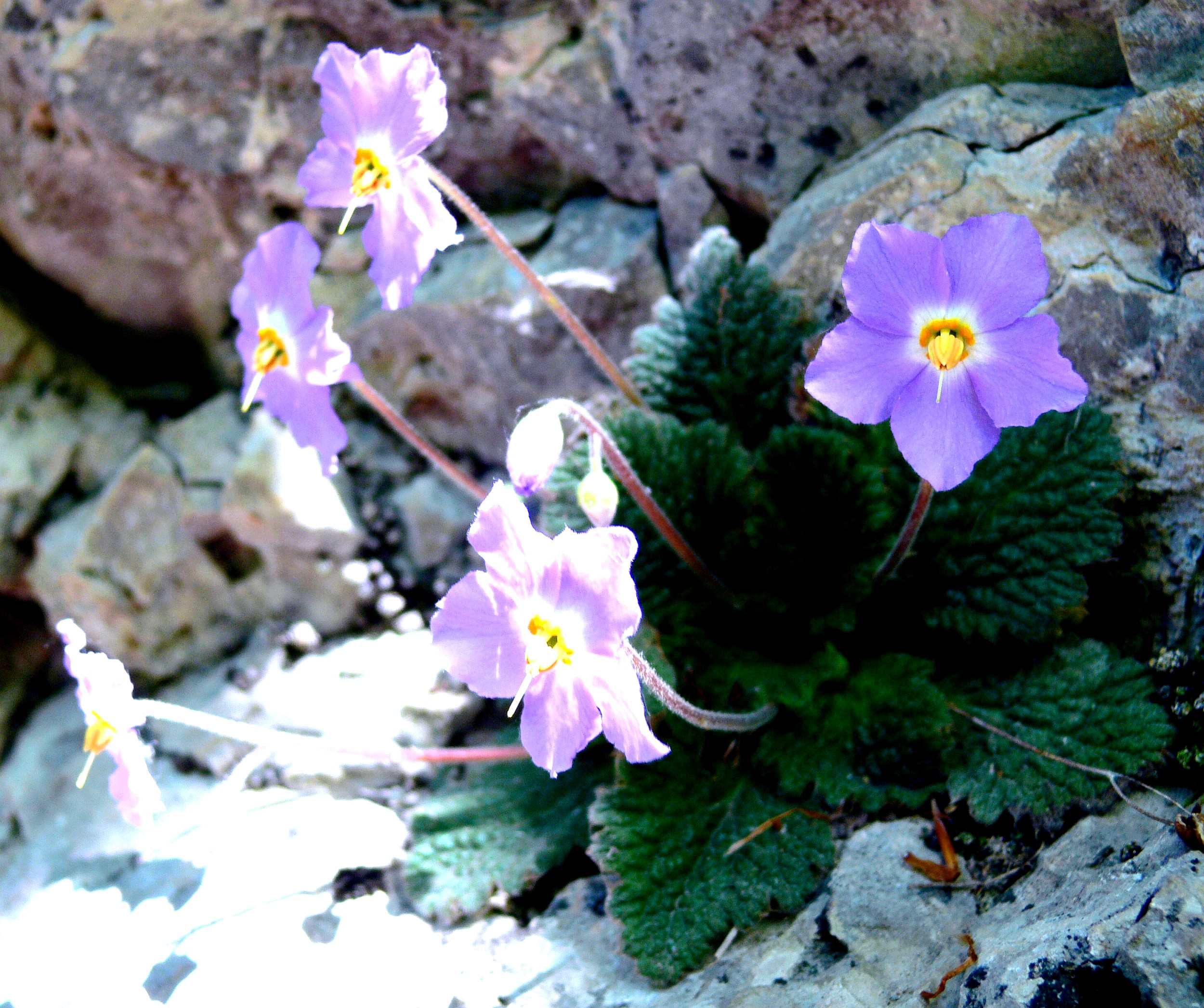
Ramonda myconi, whose genus was named for Louis Ramond de Carbonnières.

The genus Ramonda, which comprises four species of flowering plants native to shady, rocky places in north eastern Spain, the Pyrenees and south eastern Europe, is named for the French explorer.

=== Contemporary perception ===
The definition of the term pyrénéisme continues to be the subject of debate. For the academic André Suchet, Pyreneanism is merely a reaction, "a strong identity-based intention against Alpine dominance". According to the geographer Arnauld de Sartre, pyrénéisme can indeed be seen as a form of chauvinism, but it is above all a possibilism. In fact, he describes Pyreneist as identifying themselves with a social group for over a century and establishing an original relationship, both constructed and inherited, with the preserved natural environment of the mountains. He identifies written narrative as the "true keystone of pyrénéisme".

Patrice de Bellefon, a high-mountain guide and author specializing in Pyreneism, also defines it in opposition to alpinism. The alpinist operates in a mineral world devoid of human presence, whereas the Pyreneanist incorporates the living and the cultural. Alpinism would thus be based on a spirit of conquest, and Pyreneanism on that of sharing. From this perspective, the originality of Pyrenean exploration lies in a particular relationship created with the natural environment through the mediation of a culture stemming from Romanticism and the Enlightenment.

Beraldi's neologism, over 100 years old, remains virtually unknown outside the circle of Pyrenean mountaineers. However, publishing activity persists, with several publishing houses that publish works dedicated solely or in part to Pyreneanism: Milan Presse, Éditions Sud Ouest, Éditions du Pin à Crochets, La Balaguère, and Éditions Cairn. Several periodicals also appear in this vein: Pyrénées Magazine, Revue pyrénéenne, and Les Feuilles du Pin à Crochets. More than 100 websites are devoted to it, and many high-level mountaineers have emerged from its ranks. Knowledge of the movement's history appears to be a prerequisite for being a "complete Pyreneanist." As a result, historical reconstructions are frequent in Pyreneanist publishing outputs and have become a standard feature in the introductions to contemporary guidebooks.

In 2020, Manel Rocher Gonzalez, director of the PyrenMuseu in the Val d'Aran, and Claude Molinier, a mountain guide, formalized the idea of submitting pyrénéisme as a candidate for inclusion on UNESCO's list of the Intangible Cultural Heritage of Humanity, a distinction obtained by alpinism in 2019.

== Select Pyreneists and Pyrenean mountaineers ==
This non-exhaustive list includes Pyrenean mountaineers featured in the prosopographical database compiled by Étienne Bordes for his work on the history of Pyrenean mountaineering, published in 2024, and some prominent Pyrenean mountaineers of the 20th century:

- Louis Ramond de Carbonnières (1755–1827), French politician, geologist and botanist; considered the father of Pyreneanism
- Vincent de Chausenque (1781–1868), French naturalist
- Anne Lister (1791–1840), English diarist
- Pierrine Gaston-Sacaze (1797–1893), French botanist; curator of a large herbarium of the Pyrenees
- Émilien Frossard (1802–1881), French pastor and naturalist; founding member of the Société Ramond
- Charles de Nansouty (1815–1895), French soldier; founder of the Pic du Midi Observatory
- Paul Édouard Wallon (1821–1895), French lawyer and explorer
- Charles Packe (1826–1896) English lawyer and explorer
- Adrien Bayssellance (1829–1907), French maritime engineer
- Alfred Tonnellé (1831–1858), French author and poet
- Henry Russell (1834–1909), explorer and author
- Eugène Trutat (1840–1910), geologist and photographer, curator of the Museum of Toulouse
- Franz Schrader (1844–1924), French mountaineer, geographer, cartographer and landscape painter
- Léonce Lourde-Rocheblave (1847–1898), French explorer; creator of the Refuge de Tuquerouye, the first Pyrenean refuge at the Pass of Tuquerouye
- Félix Régnault (1847–1908), French publisher and naturalist
- Maurice Gourdon (1847–1941), French photographer
- Henri Brulle (1854–1936), French mountaineer; considered the founder of pyrénéisme de difficulté (transl. Pyreneanism of difficulty)
- Henri Beraldi (1849–1931), French publisher and writer; inventor of the term pyrénéisme
- Aymar de Saint-Saud (1853–1951), French cartographer
- René d'Astorg (1860–1940), French explorer
- Juli Soler i Santaló (1865–1914), Catalan engineer, photographer and mountaineer
- Georges Ledormeur (1867–1952), French writer; author of Guide Ledormeur : Les Pyrénées Centrales du Val d'Aran à la Vallée d'Aspe; founder of the Société des excursionnistes tarbais et de la section tarbaise of the French Alpine Club; he made more than 1,500 ascents during his life and was nicknamed "Marchoucrève"
- The French Cadier brothers (George, Henri, Albert, Edward and Charles), who climbed every three-thousander
- Jean Fourcassié (1886–1955), French writer
- Lluís Estasen i Pla (1890–1947), Catalan climber, mountaineer and skier; introduced these sports to Spain
- Henri Lefebvre (1901–1991), French Marxist philosopher and sociologist
- Joseph Ribas (1931–2025), French writer
- Georges Véron (1933–2005), French mountaineer; founder of the Haute Randonnée Pyrénéenne
- Twin brothers Jean (1933–2022) and Pierre Ravier (born 1933), French alpinists
- Louis Audoubert (born 1935), French climber, photographer and writer

== See also ==
- Golden age of alpinism

== Works cited ==
- Béraldi, Henri (1898). Cent ans aux Pyrénées [One hundred years in the Pyrenees] (in French). Vol. 1. Paris: Impr. de L. Danel.
- Bordes, Étienne (2024). Petite histoire des pyrénéistes [A short history of the Pyreneist] (in French). Morlaàs: Cairn. ISBN 979-10-7006-381-1.
