= Gavarnie-Gèdre =

- Commune
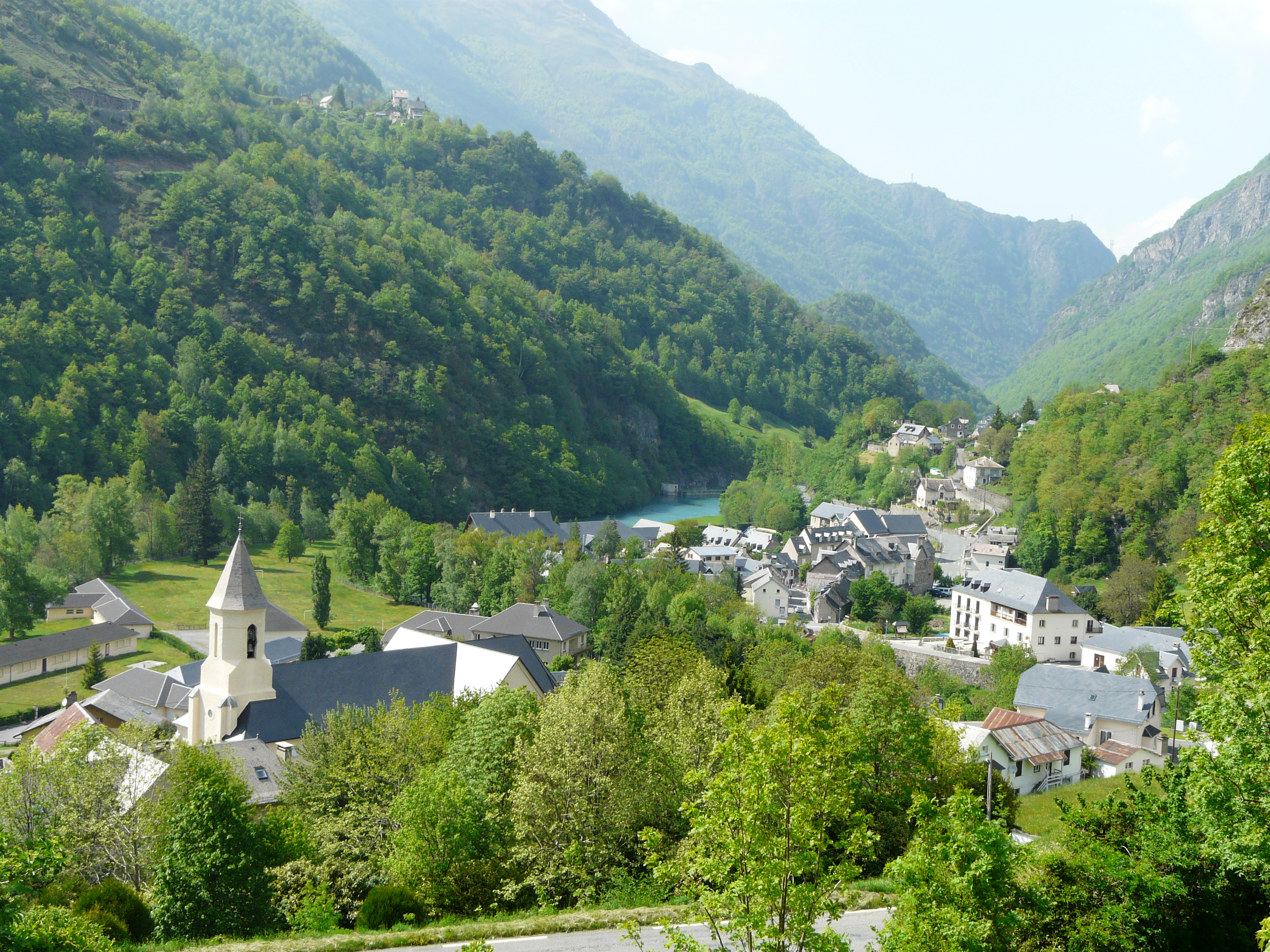
- A general view of Gèdre
- Location of Gavarnie-Gèdre
- Location within France Location within Occitanie
- Coordinates: 42°47′20″N 0°01′08″E
- Country: France
- Region: Occitania
- Department: Hautes-Pyrénées
- Arrondissement: Argelès-Gazost
- Canton: La Vallée des Gaves
- Area^{1}: 227.08 km^{2} (87.68 sq mi)
- Population (2023): 340
  - Density: 1.5/km^{2} (3.9/sq mi)
- Time zone: UTC+01:00 (CET)
  - Summer (DST): UTC+02:00 (CEST)
- INSEE/Postal code: 65192 /65120
- ^{1} French Land Register data, which excludes lakes, ponds, glaciers > 1 km^{2} (0.386 sq mi or 247 acres) and river estuaries.

Gavarnie-Gèdre (French pronunciation: [ɡavaʁni ʒɛdʁ]; Occitan: Gavarnia e Gèdra) is a commune in the department of Hautes-Pyrénées, southwestern France. The municipality was established on 1 January 2016 by merger of the former communes of Gavarnie and Gèdre.

== Geography ==
=== Climate ===
Gavarnie-Gèdre has an oceanic climate (Köppen climate classification Cfb). The average annual temperature in Gavarnie-Gèdre is 8.6 °C (47.5 °F). The average annual rainfall is 1,471.4 mm (57.93 in) with October as the wettest month. The temperatures are highest on average in August, at around 17.0 °C (62.6 °F), and lowest in February, at around 1.6 °C (34.9 °F). The highest temperature ever recorded in Gavarnie-Gèdre was 34.1 °C (93.4 °F) on 18 August 2012; the coldest temperature ever recorded was −18.1 °C (−0.6 °F) on 8 February 2012.

Climate data for Gavarnie-Gèdre (1991−2020 normals, extremes 2007−present)
Month	Jan	Feb	Mar	Apr	May	Jun	Jul	Aug	Sep	Oct	Nov	Dec	Year
Record high °C (°F)	15.5 (59.9)	19.8 (67.6)	20.6 (69.1)	25.0 (77.0)	29.0 (84.2)	32.8 (91.0)	33.3 (91.9)	34.1 (93.4)	32.2 (90.0)	25.4 (77.7)	22.2 (72.0)	18.6 (65.5)	34.1 (93.4)
Mean daily maximum °C (°F)	6.1 (43.0)	6.7 (44.1)	9.6 (49.3)	12.5 (54.5)	15.7 (60.3)	19.9 (67.8)	23.0 (73.4)	23.6 (74.5)	19.7 (67.5)	15.8 (60.4)	9.4 (48.9)	7.2 (45.0)	14.1 (57.4)
Daily mean °C (°F)	1.6 (34.9)	1.6 (34.9)	4.2 (39.6)	7.1 (44.8)	10.0 (50.0)	13.8 (56.8)	16.6 (61.9)	17.0 (62.6)	13.4 (56.1)	10.2 (50.4)	4.9 (40.8)	2.7 (36.9)	8.6 (47.5)
Mean daily minimum °C (°F)	−2.9 (26.8)	−3.4 (25.9)	−1.2 (29.8)	1.7 (35.1)	4.4 (39.9)	7.8 (46.0)	10.1 (50.2)	10.4 (50.7)	7.2 (45.0)	4.6 (40.3)	0.5 (32.9)	−1.8 (28.8)	3.1 (37.6)
Record low °C (°F)	−16.0 (3.2)	−18.1 (−0.6)	−13.8 (7.2)	−9.8 (14.4)	−4.6 (23.7)	−0.2 (31.6)	1.9 (35.4)	2.2 (36.0)	−2.3 (27.9)	−7.1 (19.2)	−12.3 (9.9)	−14.6 (5.7)	−18.1 (−0.6)
Average precipitation mm (inches)	127.4 (5.02)	105.8 (4.17)	116.4 (4.58)	148.9 (5.86)	136.8 (5.39)	124.6 (4.91)	96.6 (3.80)	83.8 (3.30)	85.6 (3.37)	180.9 (7.12)	168.1 (6.62)	96.5 (3.80)	1,471.4 (57.93)
Average precipitation days (≥ 1.0 mm)	11.5	10.3	12.5	12.4	12.5	11.3	8.1	7.6	8.8	9.6	12.2	9.5	126.4
Source: Météo-France

== Landmarks ==
The place is famed primarily for the Cirque de Gavarnie, which is a glacial valley. The southern border is on the mountains, with Aragon, Spain.

In the village of Gavarnie is a small church. The church, built around the 12th Century, lies on the Camino route. The church contains a cabinet which claims to hold the skulls of a number of the Knights Templar who died whilst traveling to Compostela. The church was an influential factor in the listing of the village of Gavarnie as a UNESCO World Heritage Site. The village is visited by those who ski and by HCPT Pilgrimages to Lourdes.

== See also ==
- Communes of the Hautes-Pyrénées department
