= Gavarnie Falls =

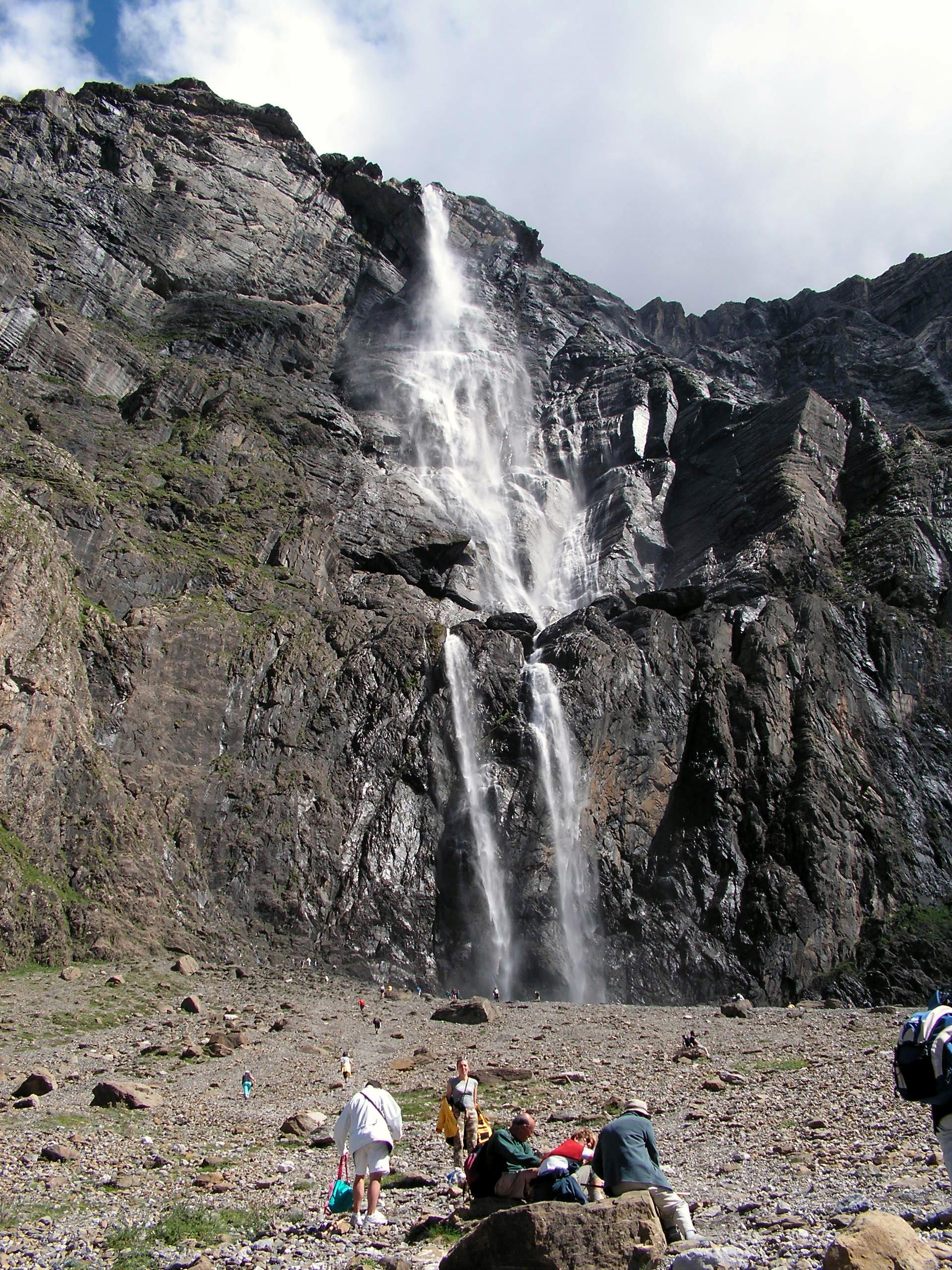
- Gavarnie Falls

- Location within France
- Location: Hautes-Pyrénées (France)
- Coordinates: 42°41′36″N 0°00′16″W
- Elevation: ~ 2 200 m
- Total height: 422 m (1,385 ft)
- Number of drops: 2
- Longest drop: 281 m (922 ft)
- Total width: 15 m (49 ft)
- Watercourse: Gave de Pau

The Gavarnie Falls (French: Grande Cascade de Gavarnie) is a tiered waterfall in France. With its overall drop of 422 metres, it is the highest waterfall in mainland France. The falls are situated in the Cirque de Gavarnie, near the village Gavarnie in the Hautes-Pyrénées.

The waterfall is the beginning of the Gave de Pau stream. It is fed by a melting snow and a small glacier, located in Spain. This water seeps underground until it appears at the upper rim of waterfall. The average annual flow in the waterfall is 3 m^{3}/s. In summer, when the snowmelt is most intense, it can reach up to 200 m^{3}/s. In winter it sometimes freezes and stops flowing.

The waterfall has 2 - 3 steps; the height of the tallest drop is 281 m.

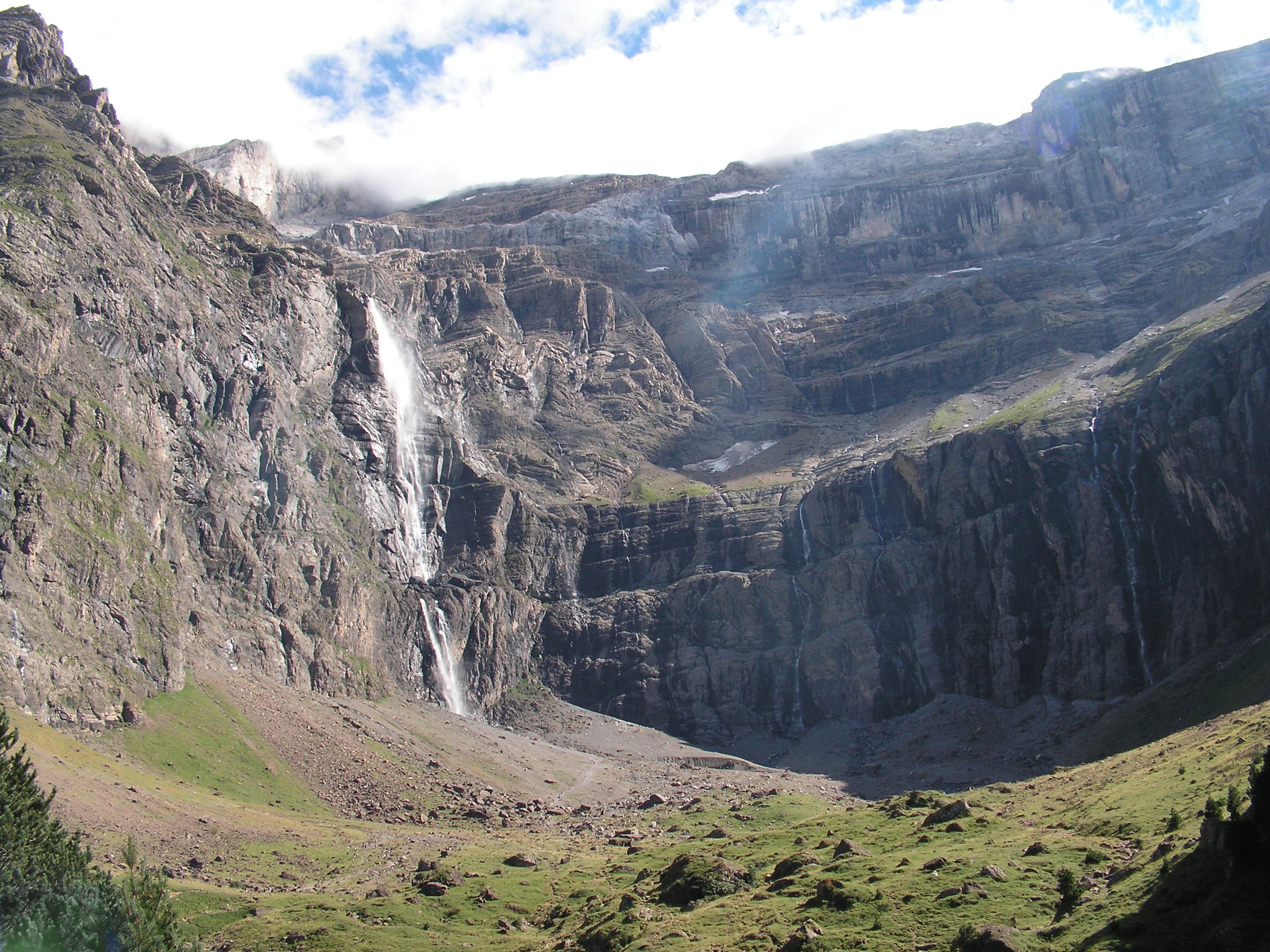
Cirque de Gavarnie, with the waterfall to the left

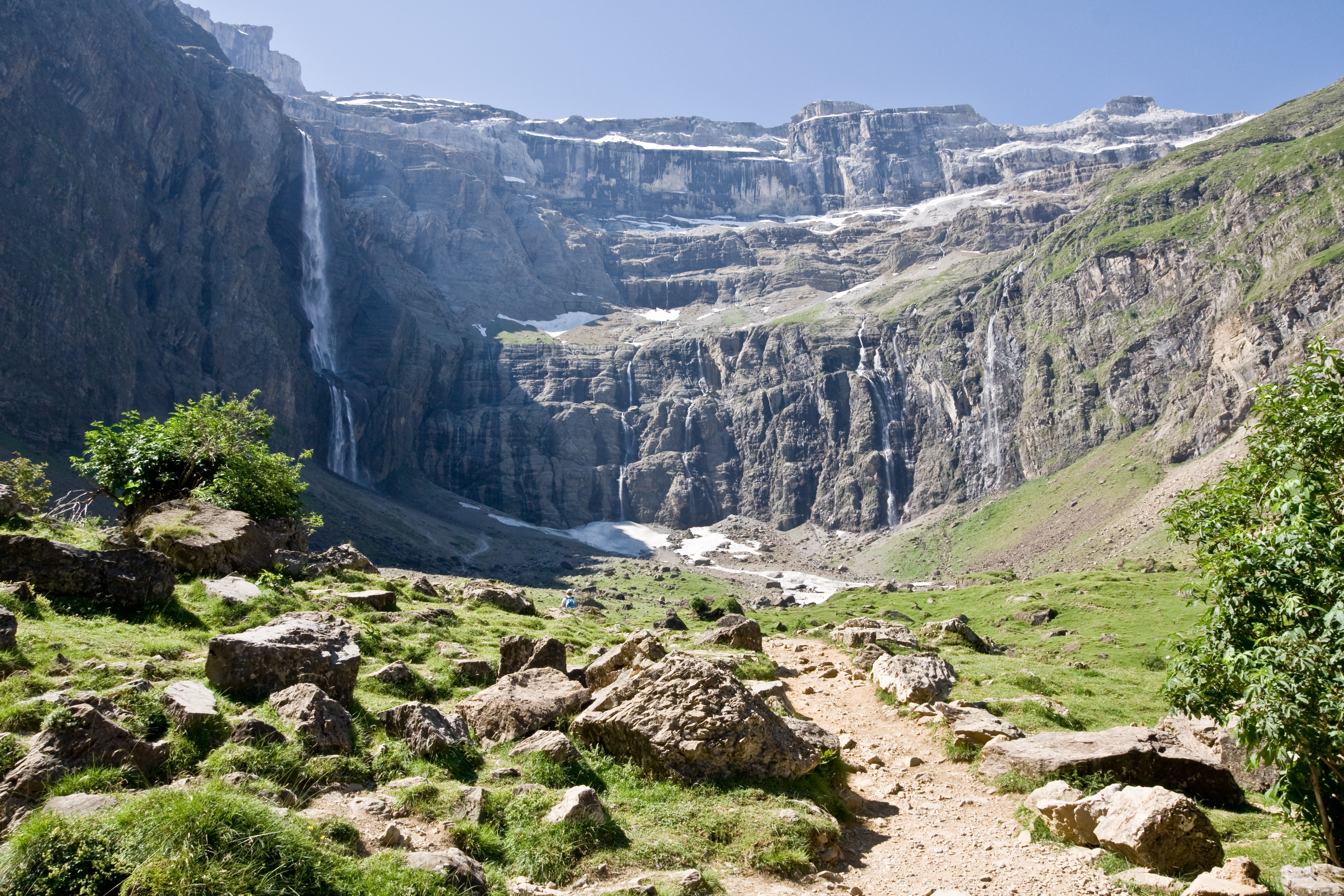
Centre of the cirque in summer

Wider view of Cirque de Gavarnie

== See also ==
- List of waterfalls
