= Henri Béraldi =

French bibliophile, publisher and author

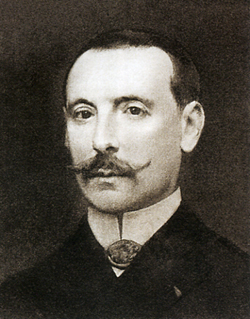
- Born: 6 February 1849 Paris, France
- Died: 31 March 1931 (aged 82) Paris, France

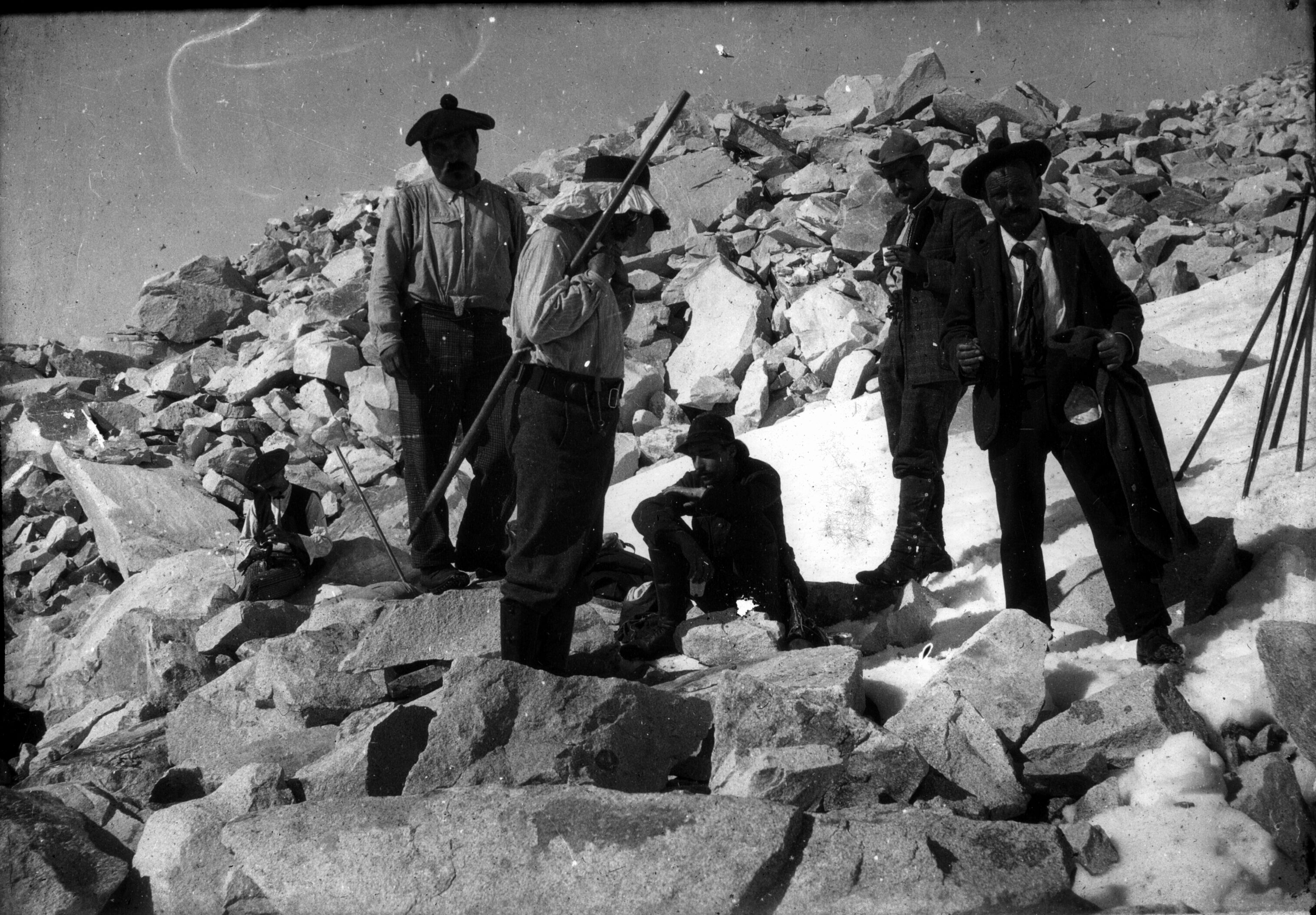
Henri Béraldi with his son and others during an ascent of Aneto, the highest mountain in the Pyrenees, ca. 1900.

Henri Béraldi (6 February 1849, Paris – 31 March 1931, Paris) was a French bibliophile, publisher and author of books on the Pyrenees and on French printmakers of the 19th century.

Henri Béraldi was the son of Pierre Louis Béraldi, a senator in the Third Republic between 1876 and 1885. Henri married Mathilde Gavet in 1880. They had five children, including Pierre and André Béraldi, both chevaliers of the Légion d'honneur, and Jacques Béraldi, an officier in the same order.

The collection of Henri Béraldi consisted mainly of French illustrated books and books with special bindings, and was considered one of the four most important collections of its type, together with the collections of Ferdinand James von Rothschild, Louis Roederer and Robert Schuhmann.

He enjoyed holidays in the spa town of Bagnères-de-Luchon in the Pyrenees, and became a noted writer on the range. Pic Béraldi, also known as the Eriste N or the Bagüeñola Norte, is a 3,205m-high peak in the Spanish Province of Huesca named after him.

Béraldi was the president of the Société des amis des livres. from 1901 to 1931, and an officier of the Légion d'honneur.

After his death in 1931, his collection (minus a selection of books on the Pyrenees, which was donated to the library of Toulouse) was sold in a five-day auction in 1934–35.

== Books by Béraldi ==
- 1874: L'oeuvre de Moreau le jeune
- 1879: Charles-Étienne Gaucher : graveur : notice et catalogue, together with Baron Roger Portalis
- 1880–1882: Les graveurs du XVIIIe siècle, together with Baron Roger Portalis, published by Morgand et Fatout in Paris.
- 1884: Mes estampes, 1872–1884
- 1885: 1865–1885: Bibliothèque d'un Bibliophile, published by L. Danel in Lille
- 1885–1892: Les Gravures du XIXe Siecle, 12 volumes
- 1892: Estampes et Livres, 1872–1892, published by Conquet
- 1892: Raffet, peintre national
- 1893: Voyage d'un livre à travers la Bibliothèque Nationale, published by G. Masson in Paris
- 1895–1897: La reliure du XIXè siècle
- 1898–1904: Cent Ans aux Pyrenées, published in Paris in 7 volumes
- 1902: Exposition de la reliure moderne au Musée Galliera. Mai-juin 1902. Rapport général
- 1904: L'œuvre gravé et lithographié de Alphonse Legros, orné d'une eau-forte originale, et d'un fac-similé du portrait de l'artiste d'après son propre dessin., published by Hesselé in Paris
- 1907–1910: Balaitous et Pelvoux, published in Paris in 2 volumes
- 1911–1931: Notes d'un Bibliophile, published in Paris in 10 volumes
- 1913: Un Caricaturiste Prophete. La Guerre Telle Qu'elle Est, with caricaturist Albert Robida
- 1920: Le passé du pyrénéisme. Notes d'un bibliophile, published by Lahure in Paris
- 1927: La carrière posthume de Ramond; notes d'un bibliophile 1827–1868
- 1931: En marge du Pyrénéisme. Notes d'un bibliophile. L'Affaire Rilliet-Planta, published in Paris by Béraldi
- 1934: Bibliothèque Henry Béraldi, the auction catalogue for his collection

== Books published by Béraldi ==
- 1892: Paysages Parisiens, text by Émile Goudeau, illustrations by Auguste Lepère
- 1893: Tableaux de Paris. Paris qui consomme., text by Émile Goudeau, illustrations by Pierre Vidal
- 1895: Paris au hasard, text by Georges Montorgueil, drawings and engravings by Auguste Lepère
- 1897: Tableaux de Paris. Paris qui consomme., text by Émile Goudeau, illustrations by Charles Jouas
- 1897: Poèmes Parisiens, text by Émile Goudeau, illustrations by Charles Jouas
- 1902: Paris-Staff. Exposition de 1900, text by Émile Goudeau
