= Mont Perdu =

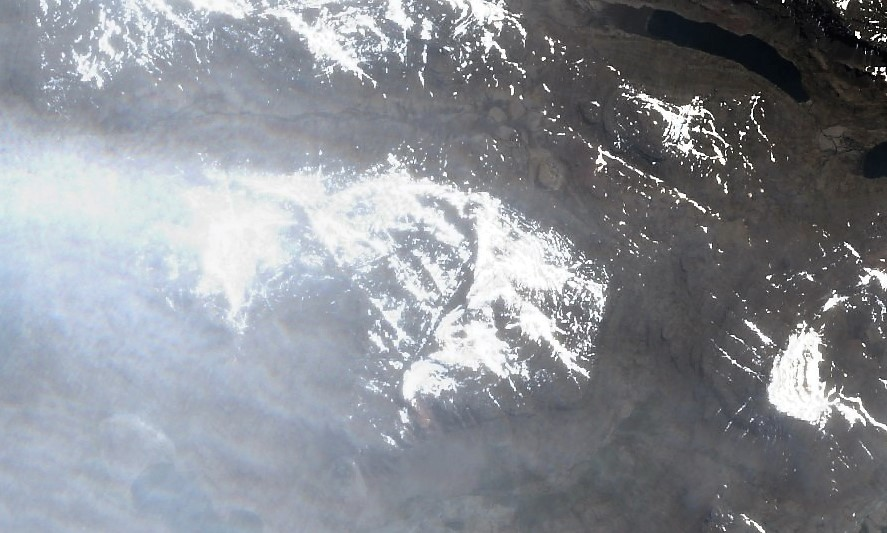
- Mont Perdu Sentinel-2 picture

Highest point
- Elevation: 993 m (3,258 ft)
- Prominence: 706 m (2,316 ft)
- Coordinates: 49°29′47″S 69°23′53″E

Geography
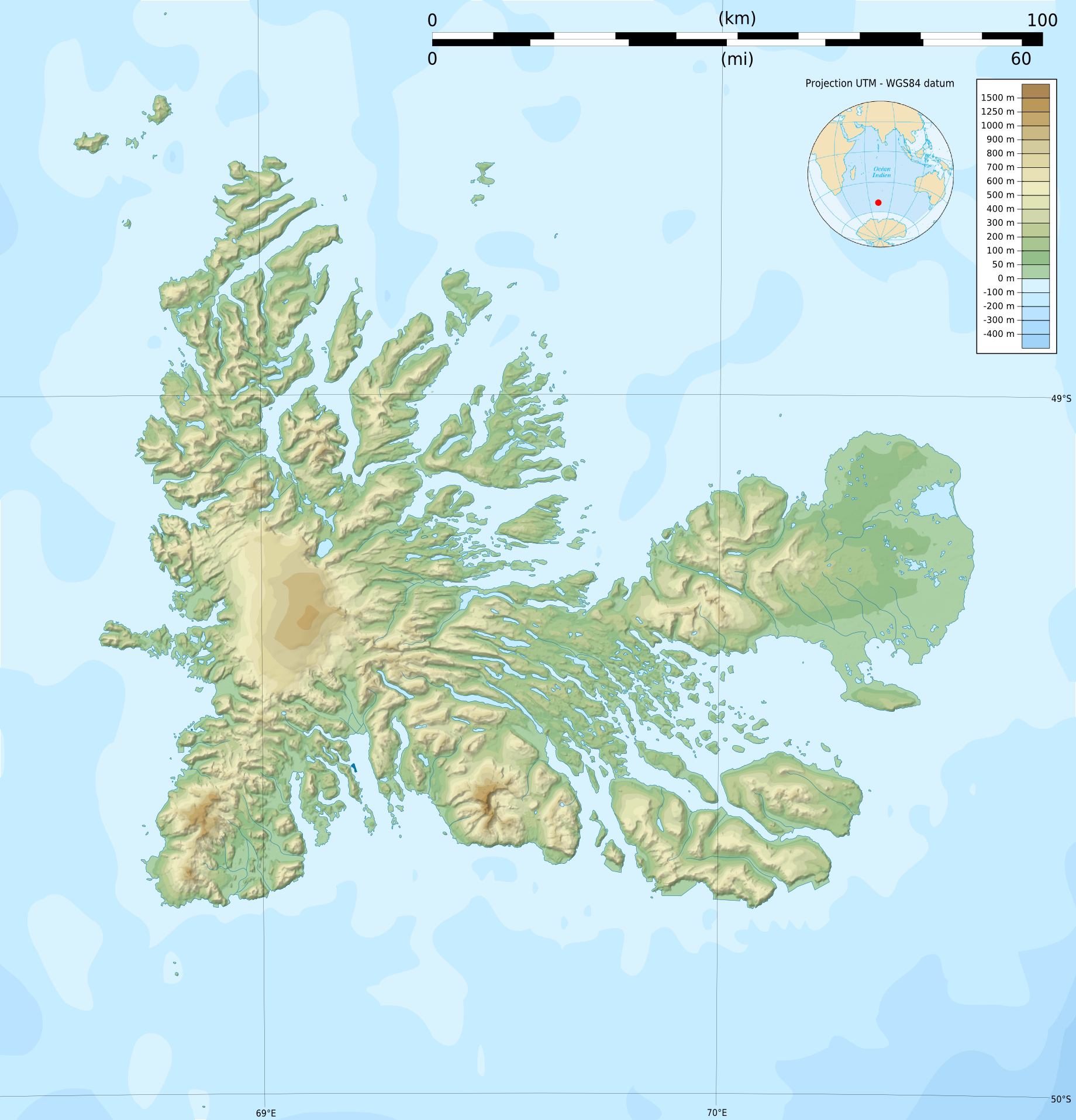
- Location within Kerguelen
- Location: Grande Terre, Kerguelen Islands, French Southern and Antarctic Lands

Climbing
- First ascent: Unknown

Mont Perdu (Lost Mountain) is a mountain in the French Southern and Antarctic Lands. Located at the southern limit of the Central Plateau of Kerguelen, northwest of Mont Ross, it rises to a height of 993 metres (3,258 ft) above sea level.

This mountain was first named by the IGN team of geographers in 1965. It appeared on the map with this name in 1967.

== See also ==
- Toponymy of the Kerguelen Islands
