= Gèdre =

Commune in Haute-Pyrénées, France

- Part of Gavarnie-Gèdre
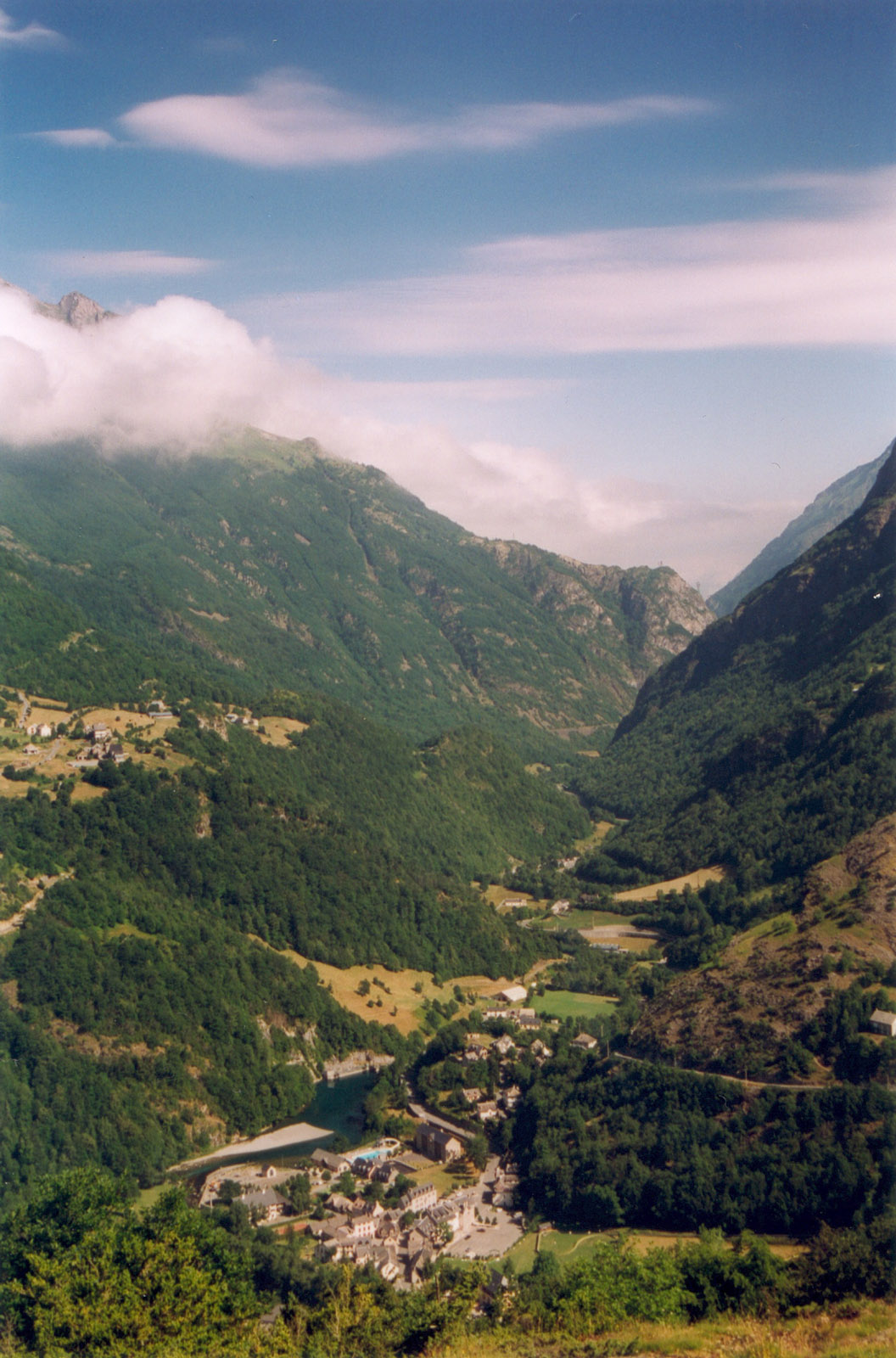
- The village of Gèdre and the valley of the Gave de Gavarnie

- Coat of arms
- Location of Gèdre
- Location within France Location within Occitanie
- Coordinates: 42°47′14″N 0°01′12″E
- Country: France
- Region: Occitania
- Department: Hautes-Pyrénées
- Arrondissement: Argelès-Gazost
- Canton: La Vallée des Gaves
- Commune: Gavarnie-Gèdre
- Area^{1}: 14.46 km^{2} (5.58 sq mi)
- Elevation: 1,000 m (3,300 ft)
- Highest elevation: 3,194 m (10,479 ft)
- Lowest elevation: 905 m (2,969 ft)
- Population (2022): 233
  - Density: 16.1/km^{2} (41.7/sq mi)
- Time zone: UTC+01:00 (CET)
  - Summer (DST): UTC+02:00 (CEST)
- Postal code: 65120
- ^{1} French Land Register data, which excludes lakes, ponds, glaciers > 1 km^{2} (0.386 sq mi or 247 acres) and river estuaries.

Gèdre (French pronunciation: [ʒɛdʁ]; Gascon: Gèdra) is a former commune in the Hautes-Pyrénées department in south-western France. On 1 January 2016, it was merged into the new commune of Gavarnie-Gèdre.

== See also ==
- Communes of the Hautes-Pyrénées department
