= Pique d'Endron =

Mountain in Occitania, France

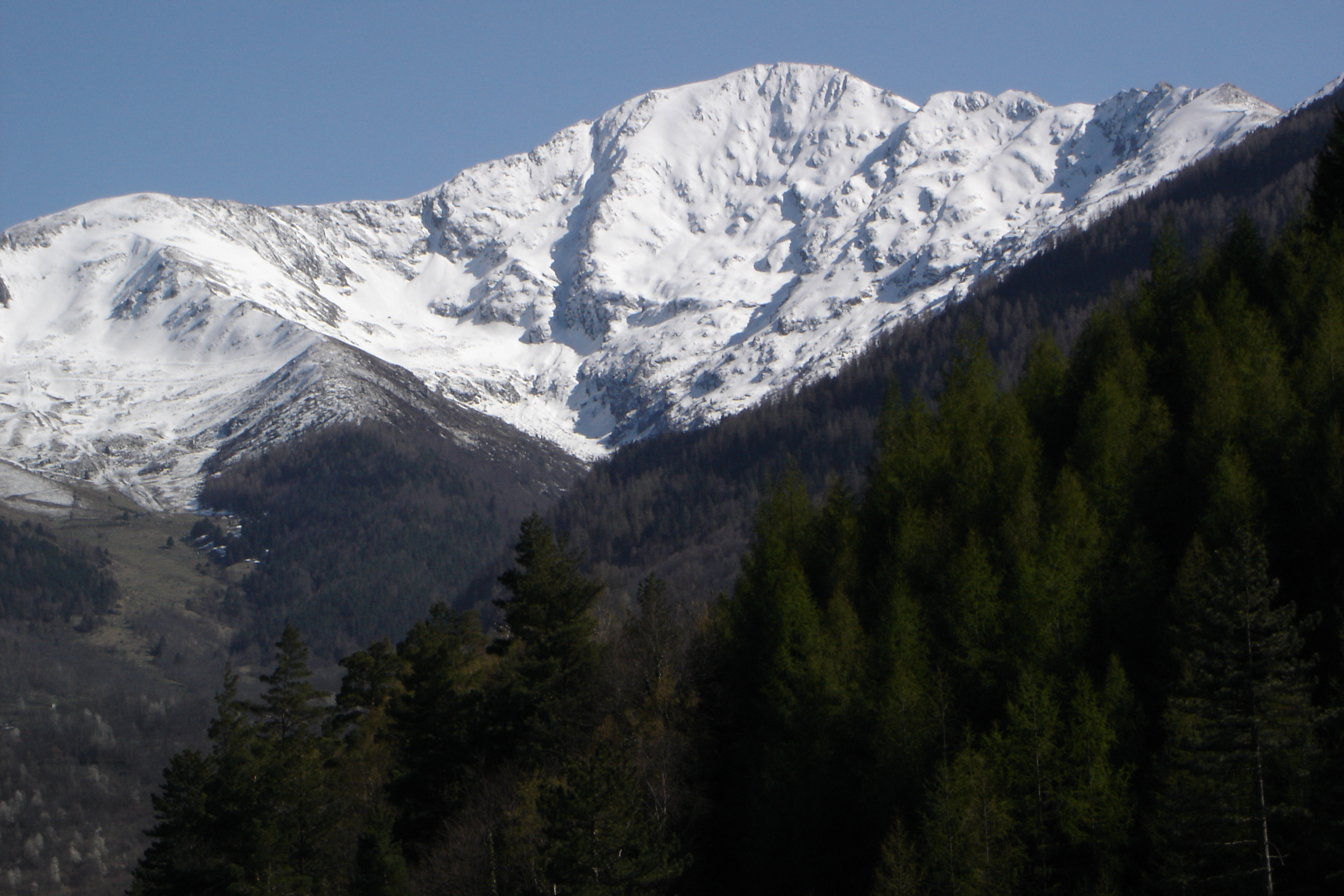
- View on the snowed Pique d'Endron.

Highest point
- Elevation: 2,472 m (8,110 ft)
- Prominence: 149 m (489 ft)
- Coordinates: 42°43′10″N 01°31′08″E

Geography
- Location within France
- Location: Ariège, France
- Parent range: Pyrenees

Climbing
- Easiest route: From Goulier

The Pique d'Endron (Occitan: La Pala d'Endron) is a French pyrenean summit which lies in the Ariège in Région Occitanie.
