= Casque du Marboré =

Pyrenean summit on the Franco-Spanish border

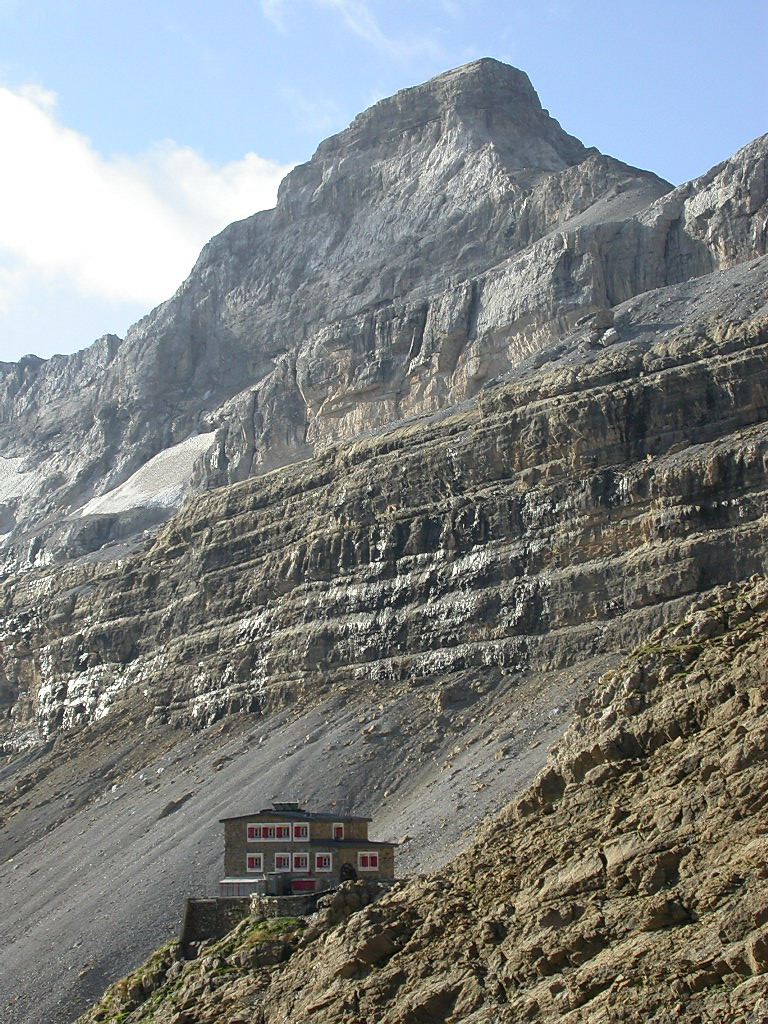
- Le refuge des Sarradets devant le casque en été

Highest point
- Elevation: 3,006 m (9,862 ft)
- Listing: List of Pyrenean three-thousanders
- Coordinates: 42°41′17″N 0°01′36″E

Geography
- Location within Pyrenees
- Location: France — Spain
- Région Communauté: Midi-Pyrénées; Aragon
- Département Province: Hautes-Pyrénées; Huesca
- Parent range: Massif du Mont-Perdu (Pyrenees)

Climbing
- Easiest route: Depuis Goriz ou Sarradets

The Casque du Marboré, or Casque de Gavarnie or simply le Casque, is a Pyrenean summit, culminating at 3,006 m (9,862 ft), located on the crest of three-thousanders in the Monte Perdido Range above Cirque de Gavarnie on the Franco-Spanish border.

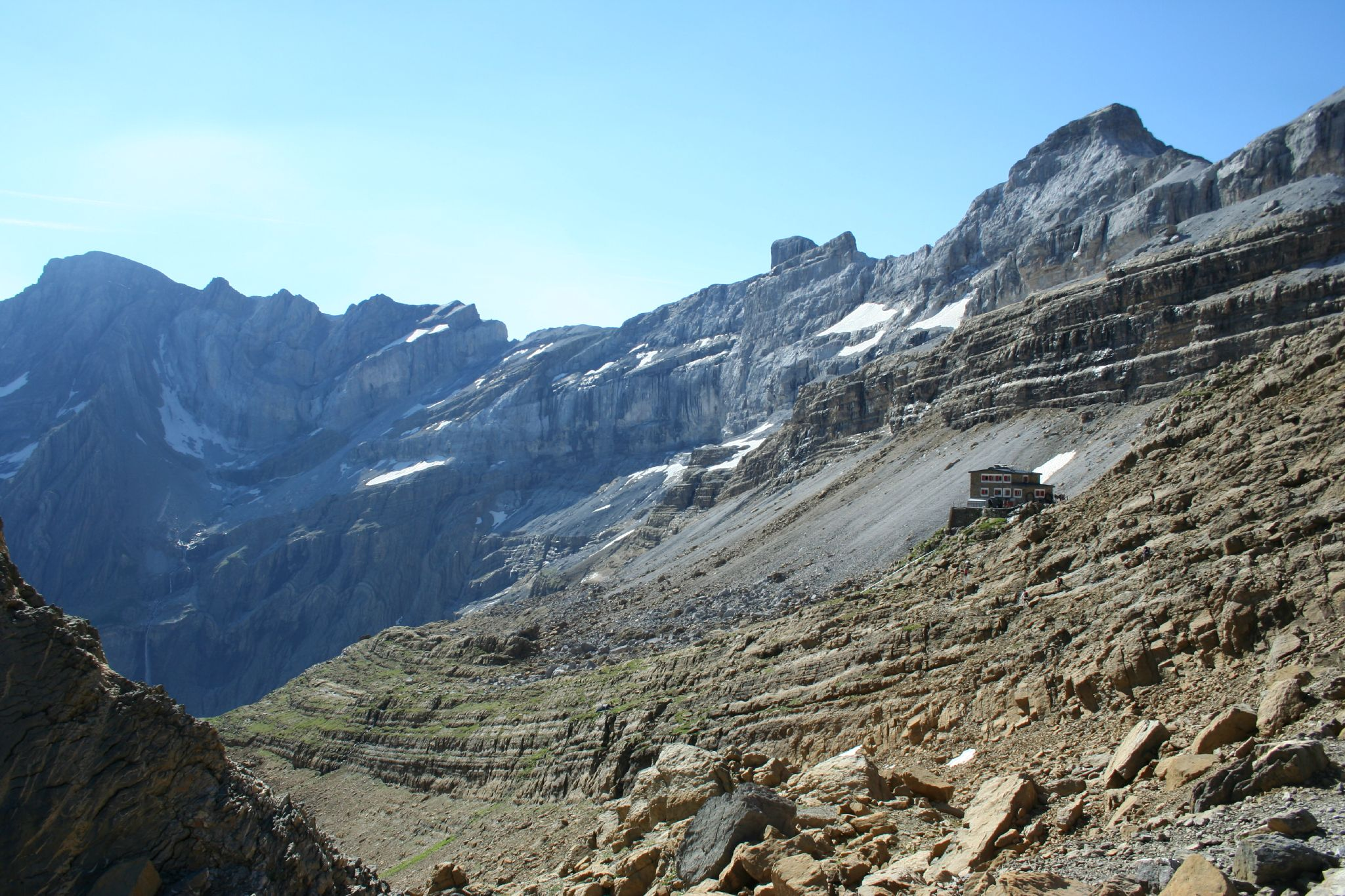
from east (left) to west (right) : pic du Marboré, pic de la cascade oriental, pic de la cascade central or pic Brulle, pic de la cascade occidental, épaule du Marboré, tour du Marboré, casque du Marboré and refuge des Sarradets; left: Gavarnie Falls. n°1 - n°2

== Toponymy ==
The term casque (a helmet) was applied to the peak due to its particular shape. The word marboré means marble, which is a metamorphic rock found in the area.

== Topography ==
Together with Tour du Marboré, the Cascade Peaks, and Pic de Marboré, it forms the range above Cirque de Gavarnie (1,500 m above the bottom of the valley marking the border between the Pyrenees National Park (France) and the Ordesa y Monte Perdido National Park, Ordesa Valley), Spain. ), The 422 m high Gavarnie falls, the biggest waterfall in Europe, descends from Casque du Marboré.

- French side: located in the commune of Gavarnie in the canton of Luz-Saint-Sauveur, Hautes-Pyrénées department, Midi-Pyrénées region.
- Spanish side: located in the comarca of Sobrarbe, Huesca province, Aragon.

== Access ==
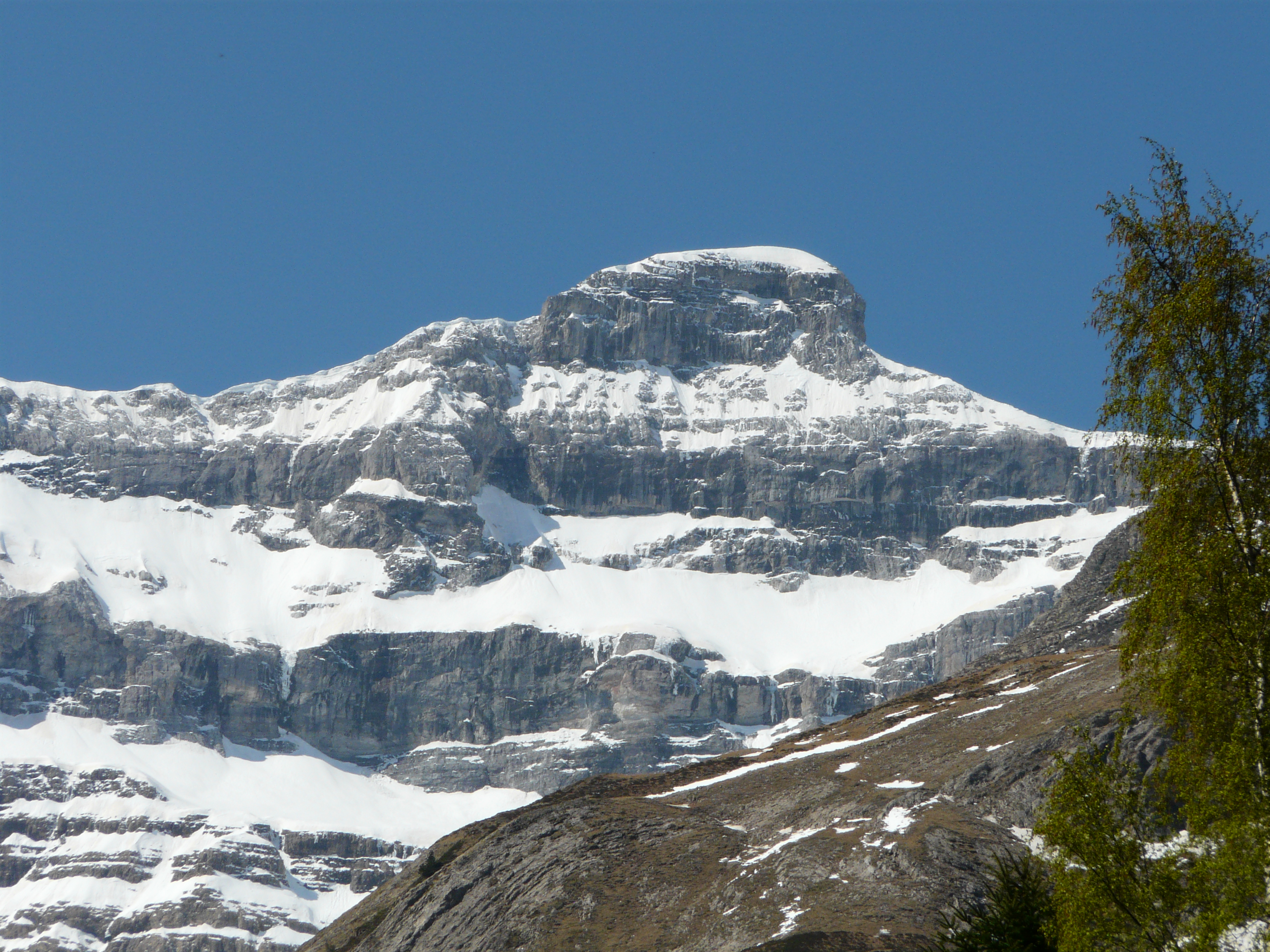
Le Casque.

Access from Spain is possible up until the prairies of Ordesa Valley, or up till Bujaruelo valley,
From France, one needs to travel to Gavarnie-Gèdre skiing resort, the nearest area to the summit.

From Ordesa, a 4 hour long upward journey is needed to reach the Goriz refuge (2,190 m ~ base camp needed to explore the area) and then follow the path which leads to la Brèche de Roland, before arriving at the pass located between la tour du Marboré and le Casque, from which one starts the final ascension.

From Ordesa, one can also reach the pass, going up through the cirque de Cotatuero or the Carriata.

From Gavarnie-Gèdre and Bujaruelo, one must go up to the Sarradets, then reach la brèche de Roland, carry on eastwards until the southern crest slope before finally reaching the pass.
