= Tour du Marboré =

Pyrenean summit on the Franco-Spanish border

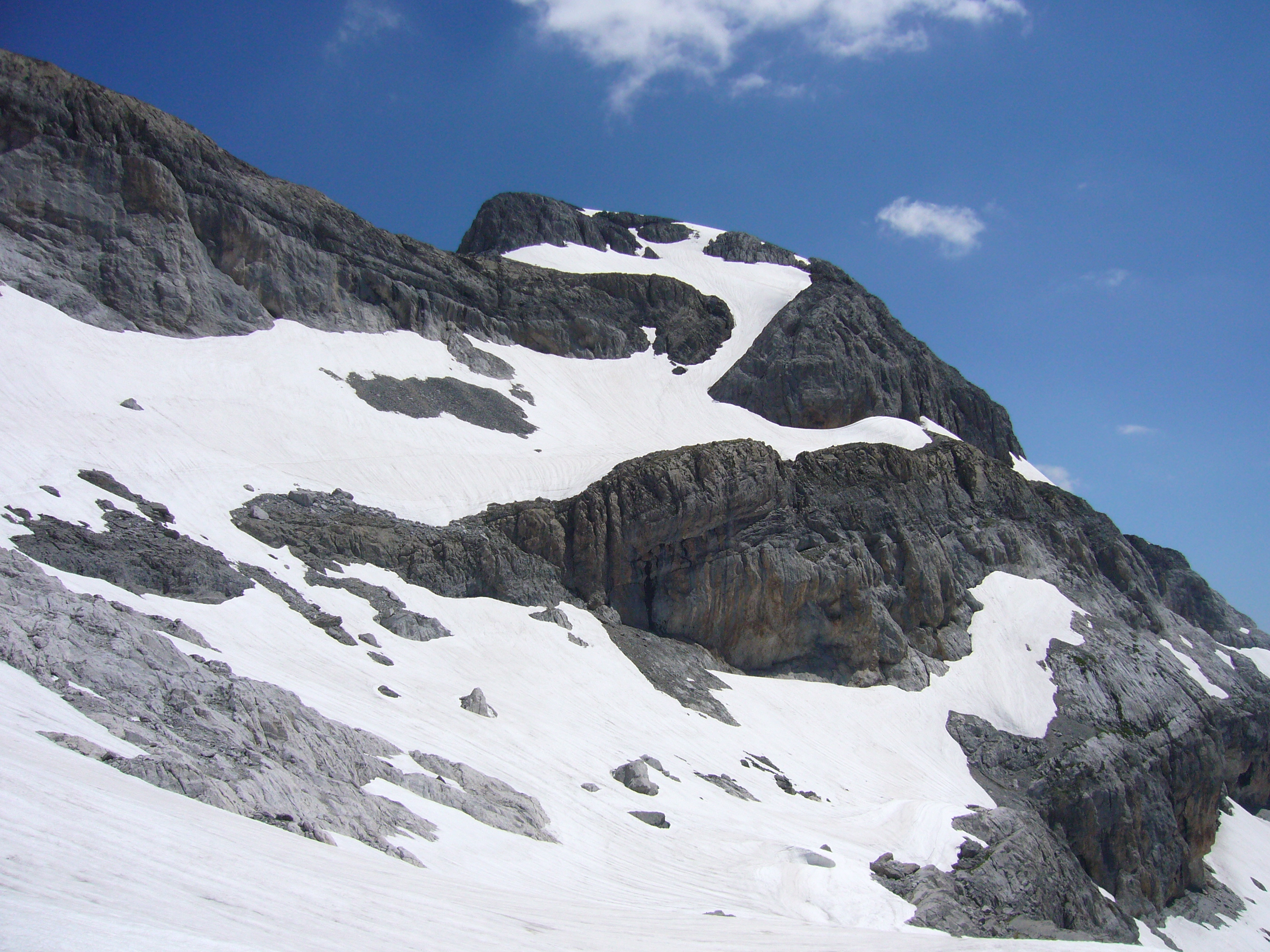
- View of the south face in summer

Highest point
- Elevation: 3,009 m (9,872 ft)
- Listing: List of Pyrenean three-thousanders
- Coordinates: 42°41′08″N 0°01′02″E

Geography
- Location within Pyrenees
- Location: France — Spain
- Région Communauté: Midi-Pyrénées; Aragon
- Département Province: Hautes-Pyrénées; Huesca
- Parent range: Massif du Mont-Perdu (Pyrenees)

Tour du Marboré (Occitan: Tornada del Marboré) or Tour de Gavarnie is a Pyrenean summit, culminating at 3,009 m (9,872 ft), located on the Franco-Spanish border crest in the Monte Perdido Range.

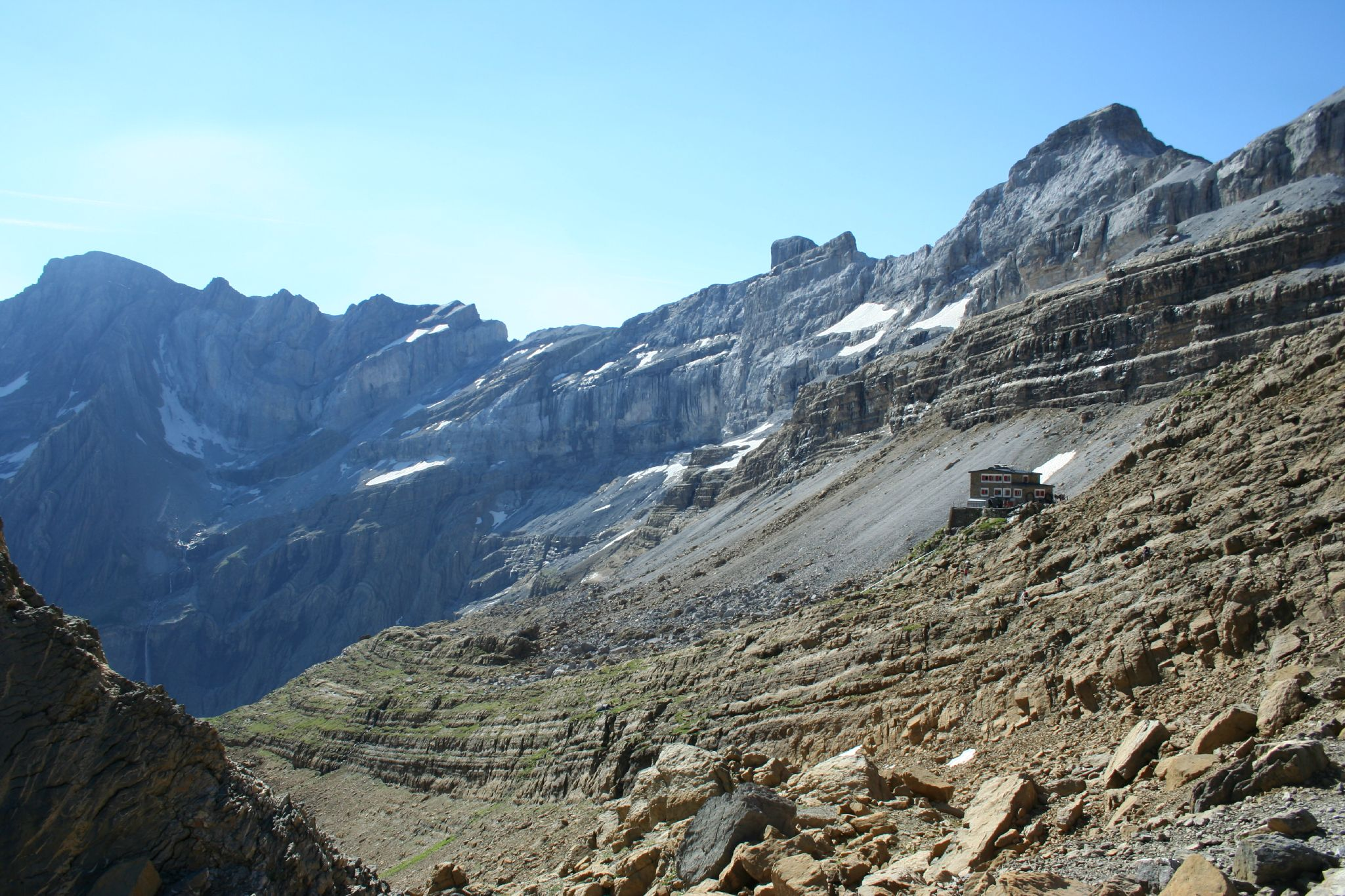
from east (left) to west (right) : Pic du Marboré, the three Cascade Peaks, Épaule du Marboré, Tour du Marboré, Casque du Marboré and refuge des Sarradets; left: Gavarnie Falls. n°1 - n°2

== Toponymy ==
see: Cilindro de Marboré

== Topography ==
The Tour du Marboré is part of the range above Cirque de Gavarnie. It marks the border between the Pyrenees National Park of France and the Ordesa y Monte Perdido National Park of Spain.

- On the French side, it is located in the commune of Gavarnie in the canton of Luz-Saint-Sauveur, Hautes-Pyrénées department, Midi-Pyrénées region.
- On the Spanish side, it is located in the comarca of Sobrarbe, Huesca province, Aragon.

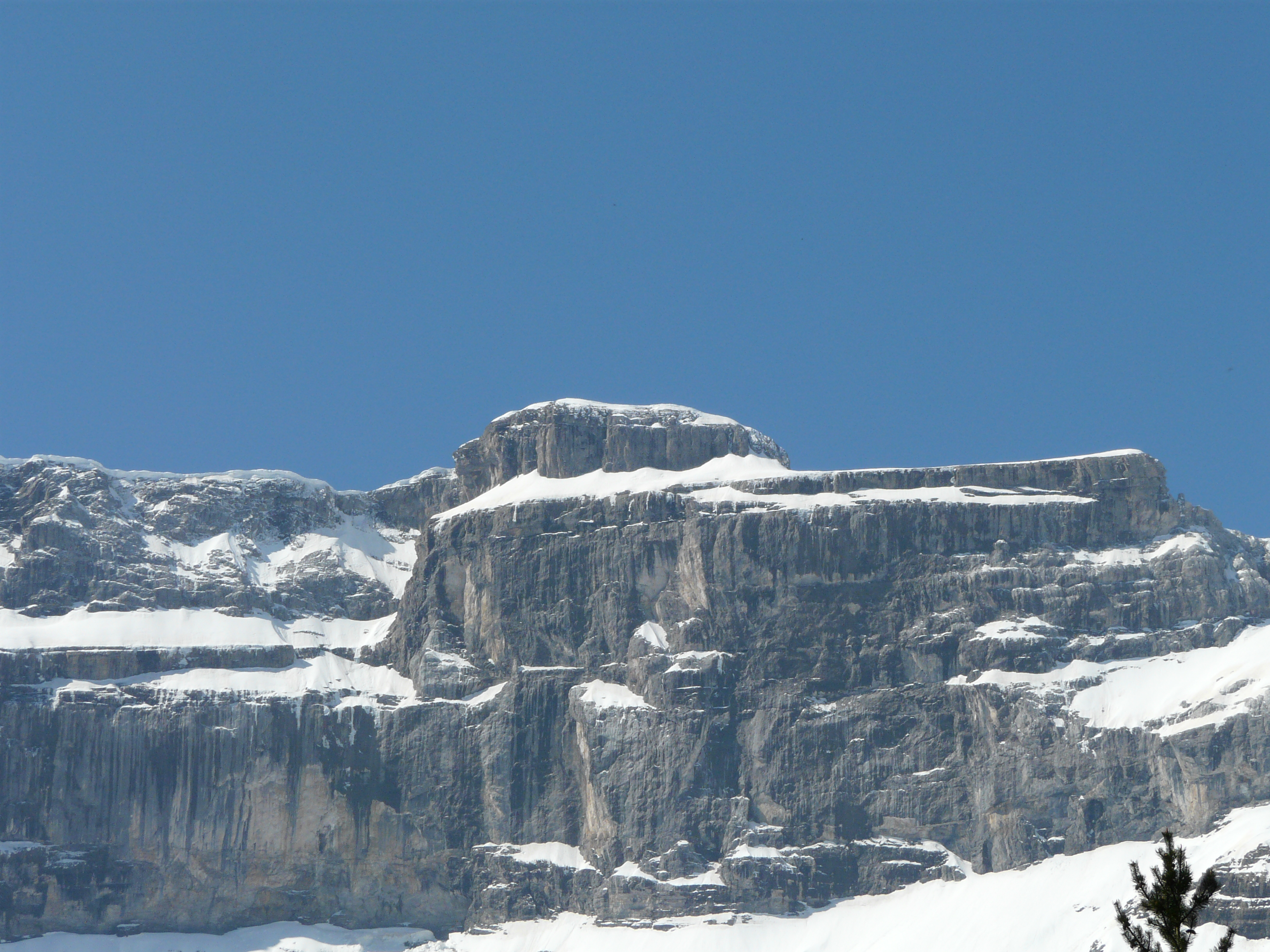
French side view of La Tour du Marboré.

== Mountaineering ==
In 1956, it was climbed from the northern side by Jean Ravier and Claude Dufourmantelle.
