= Épaule du Marboré =

Pyrenean summit on the Franco-Spanish border

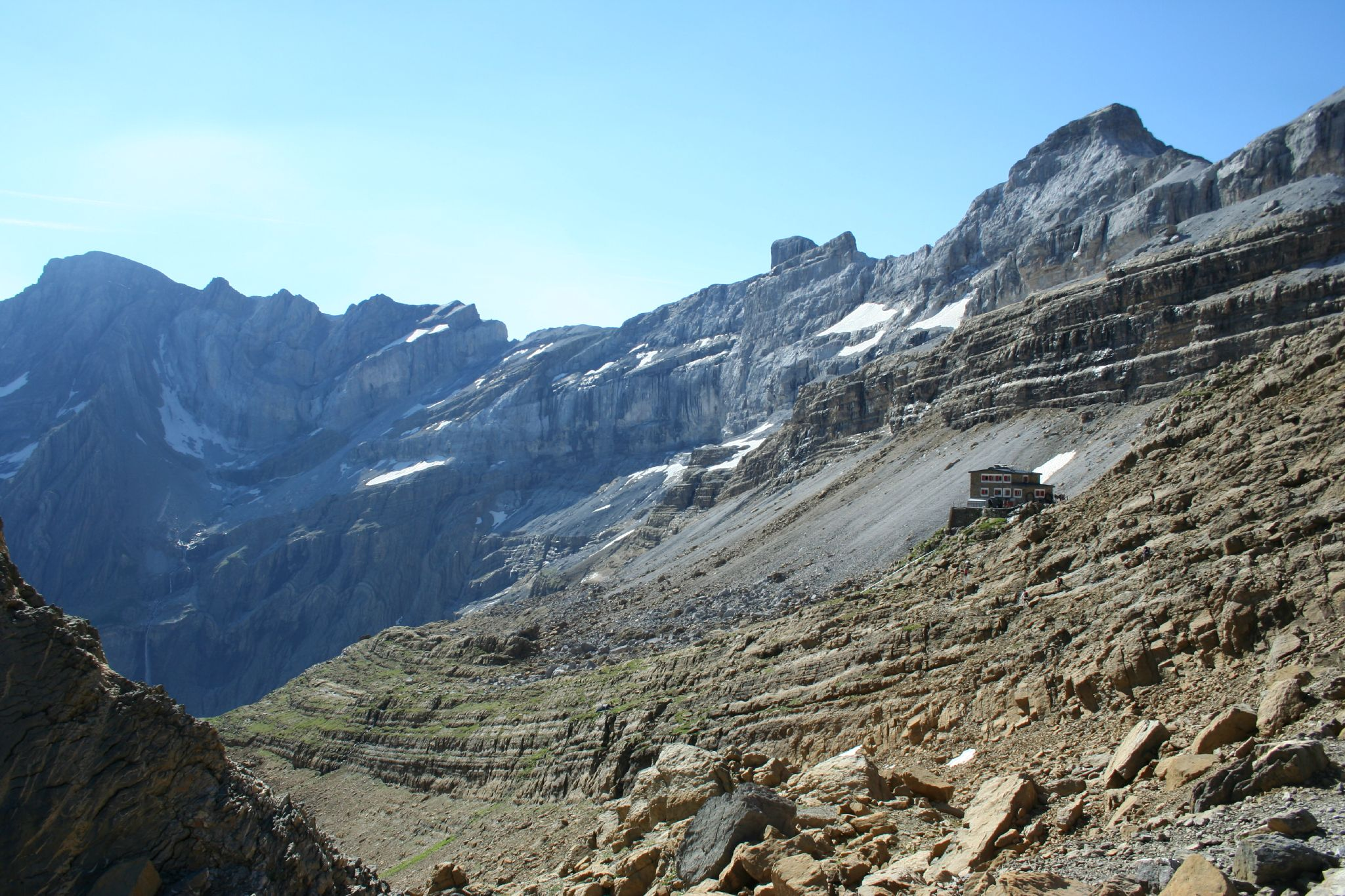
- De gauche (est) à droite (ouest) : pic du Marboré, pic de la cascade oriental, pic de la cascade central ou pic Brulle, pic de la cascade occidental, épaule du Marboré, tour du Marboré, casque du Marboré, et refuge des Sarradets. Au centre, cascade de Gavarnie. Voir encadrements des photographies n°1 et n°2 sur Commons.

Highest point
- Elevation: 3,073 m (10,082 ft)
- Listing: List of Pyrenean three-thousanders
- Coordinates: 42°41′07″N 0°00′00″E

Geography
- Location within Pyrenees
- Location: France — Spain
- Région Communauté: Midi-Pyrénées; Aragon
- Département Province: Hautes-Pyrénées; Huesca
- Parent range: Massif du Mont-Perdu (Pyrenees)

Climbing
- First ascent: August 12, 1891 by Henri Brulle, C. Passet and François Bernat-Salles

Épaule du Marboré (Occitan: Esculh de la Marboré) is a pyrenean summit, culminating at 3,073 m (10,082 ft) in the Monte Perdido Range, marking the Franco-Spanish border. It lies on the Greenwich meridien.

== Geography ==
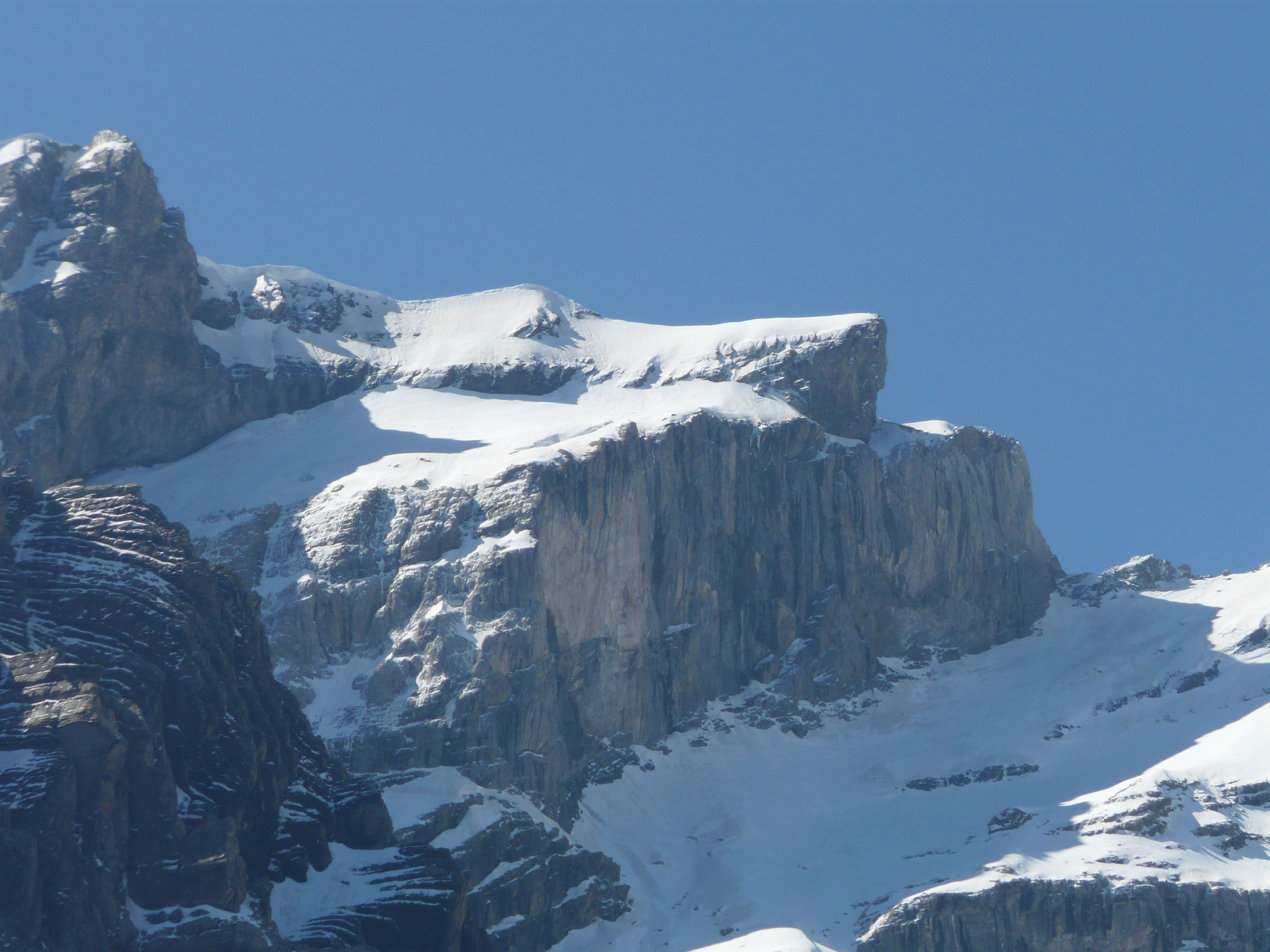
L'Épaule

== Topography ==
The Tour du Marboré forms part of the range above Cirque de Gavarnie. It marks the border between the Pyrenees National Park of France and the Ordesa y Monte Perdido National Park of Spain.

On the French side, it is located in the commune of Gavarnie in the canton of Luz-Saint-Sauveur, Hautes-Pyrénées department, Midi-Pyrénées region.
