= Pic du Taillon =

Summit in the Pyrenees on the Franco-Spanish border

Pic du Taillon Pico Taillón
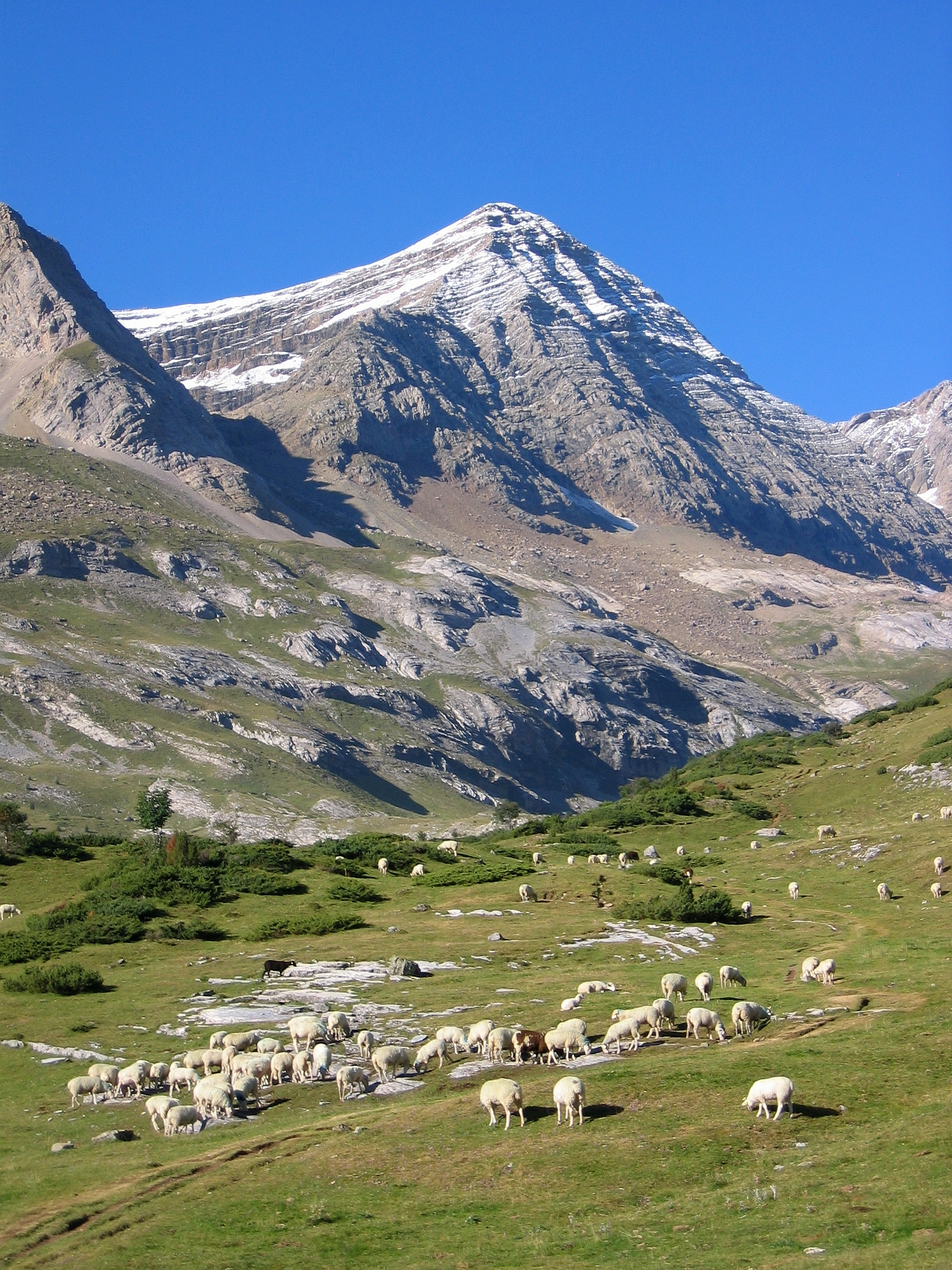
- North face of Taillon

Highest point
- Elevation: 3,144 m (10,315 ft)
- Prominence: 342 m (1,122 ft)
- Coordinates: 42°41′37″N 0°03′05″E

Geography
- Location within Pyrenees
- Location: France — Spain
- Région Communauté: Midi-Pyrénées; Aragon
- Département Province: Hautes-Pyrénées; Huesca
- Parent range: Massif du Mont-Perdu (Pyrénées)

Climbing
- First ascent: 1792 par Heredia
- Easiest route: Par la brèche de Roland (randonnée alpine)

Pic du Taillon (in French) or Pico Taillón (in Spanish) is a summit in the Pyrenees, culminating at 3,144 m (10,315 ft) on the Franco-Spanish border in the Monte Perdido Range.

Pic du Taillon is considered one of the easiest 3,000ers above the Cirque de Gavarnie. Only the last part from the "finger" of the False Defile (le Doigt de la Fausse Brèche) is a little steep, but the climb never technically difficult in the absence of snow. The panorama from the summit is grandiose, offering a view of the Monte Perdido Range, the Vignemale Range, the Néouvielle Range, Balaïtous and Pic du Midi de Bigorre on a clear day.

== Topography ==
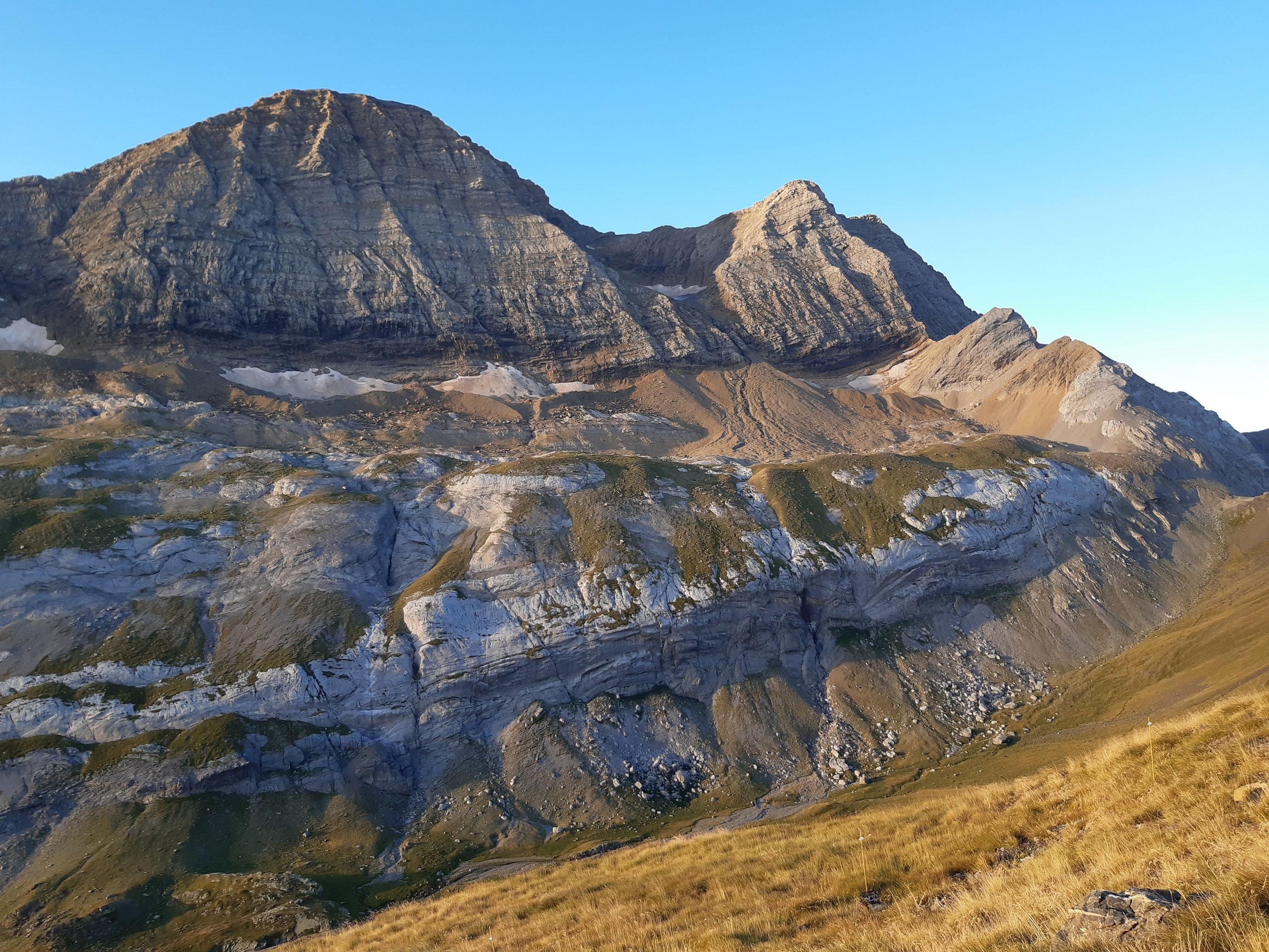
Northern side view from the Col de Tentes

It is part of the range above Cirque de Gavarnie and is located between the Fausse Brèche "finger" and les Gabiétous. It marks the limit between the Pyrenees National Park (France) and the Ordesa y Monte Perdido National Park (Spain).

- French side : located near Gavarnie, canton of Luz-Saint-Sauveur, Hautes-Pyrénées department, Midi-Pyrénées region.
- Spanish side : located in the comarca of Sobrarbe, Huesca province, Aragon.

== History ==
The first known ascension was that of Heredia, a Spanish military cartographer in 1792. In 1895, Henri Brulle and guide Célestin Passet achieved the first ascension on the northern side.

== Access ==
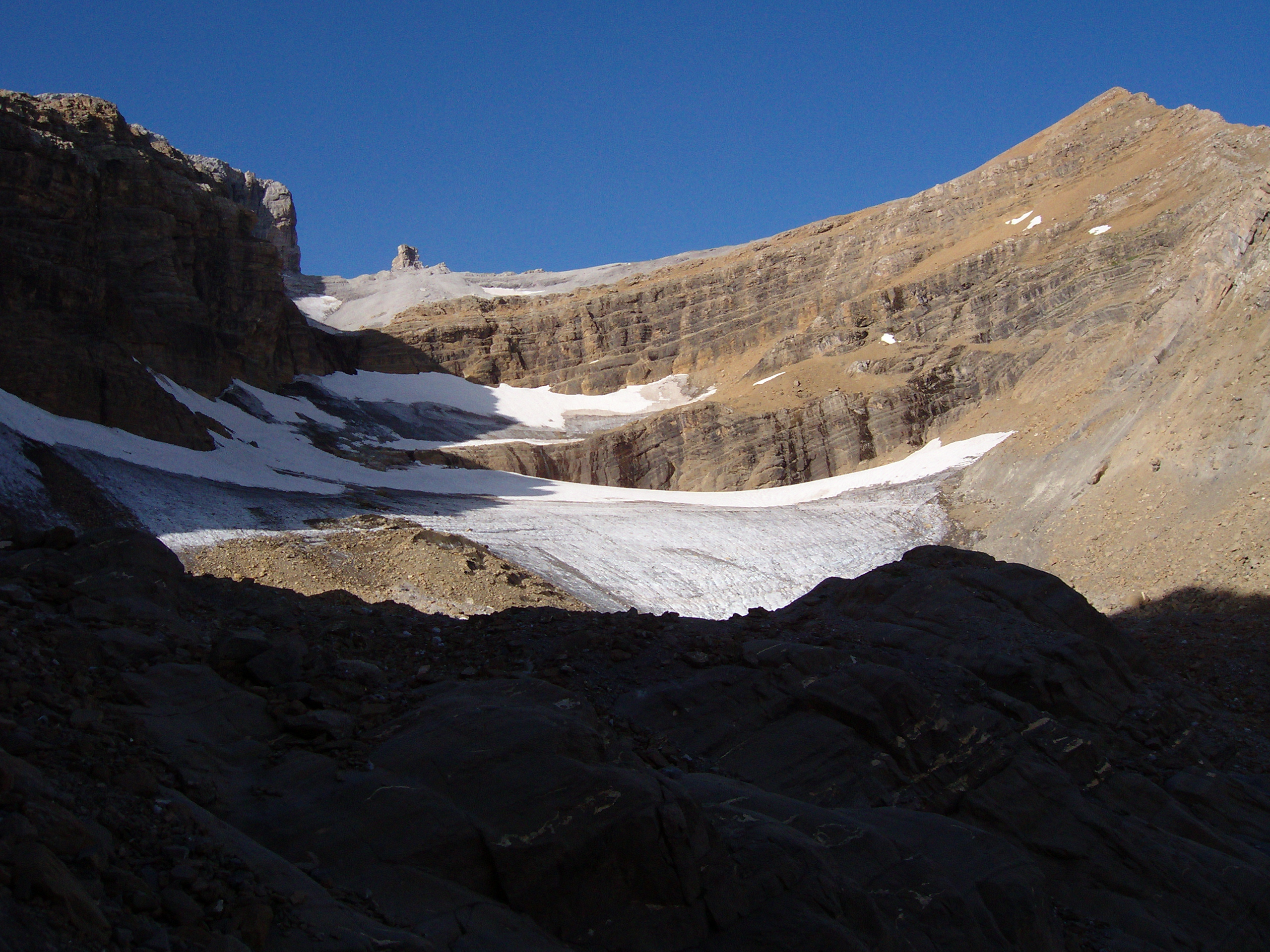
Taillon ascension (right) from the col de Boucharo. Left, the pointe Bazillac and in the middle the Doigt de la Fausse Brèche.

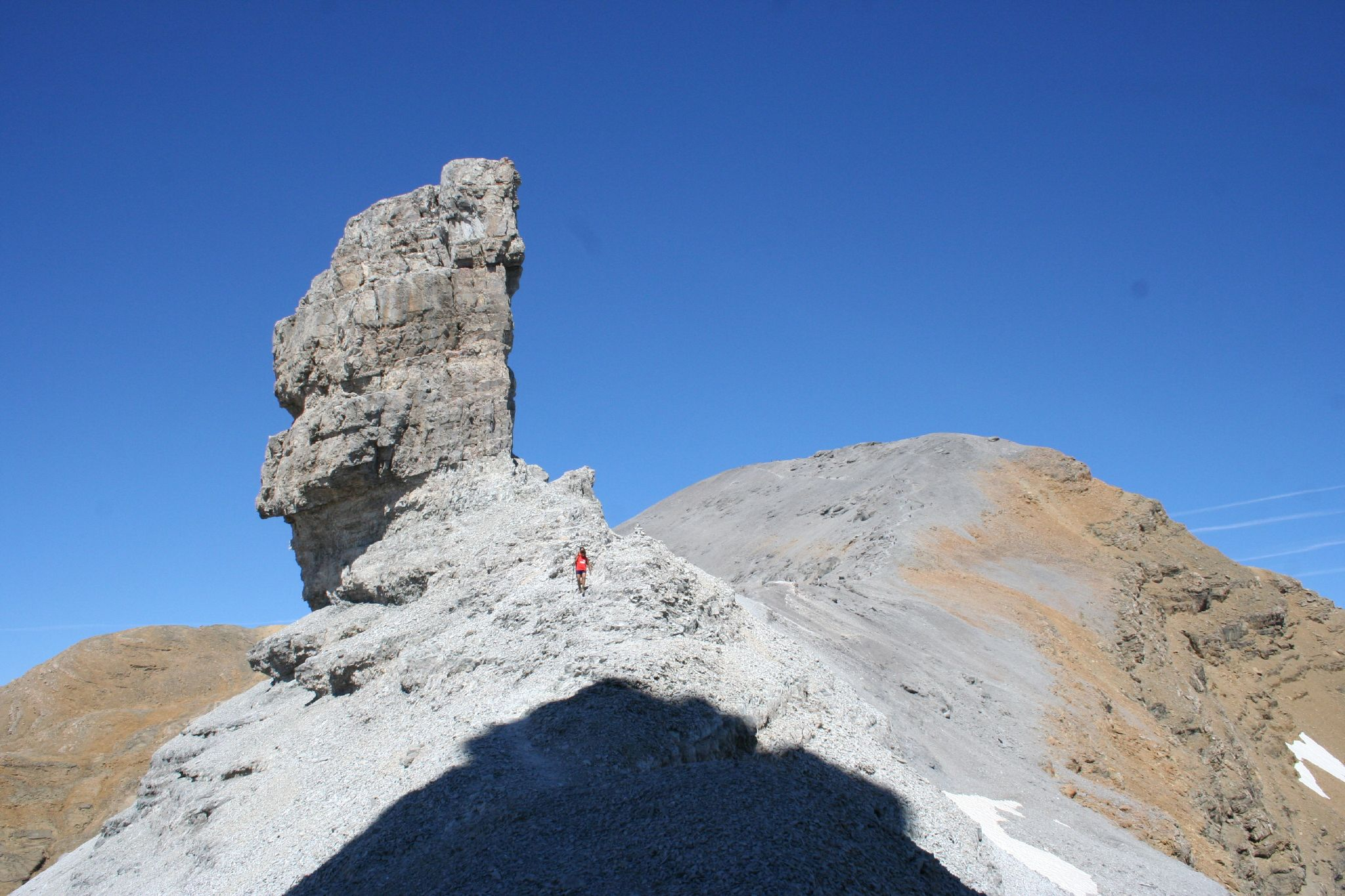
View from la Fausse Brèche on the Doigt de la Fausse Brèche with the Taillon summit (3,144 m) en fond et la pointe Bazillac en ombre portée.

One way to get to the Taillon peak is to park one's car at the col des Tentes (from Gavarnie, follow the route that goes up to the skiing resort and carry on to the terminus). From there, walk to the col de Boucharo then take left to follow the path from the flanc to the waterfall. One then reaches the refuge des Sarradets (also called refuge de la Brèche de Roland). Follow the path up to la brèche onto the Spanish slope. A view then beckons on the top of the cirque de Gavarnie and the Falls. Even in summer, this segment can be covered in snow. Borrow the path on the right leading to le Doigt de la Fausse Brèche which then heads straight up to the pic du Taillon.

== See also ==
- List of Pyrenean three-thousanders
