= Refuge des Sarradets =

Mountain refuge in the Pyrenees

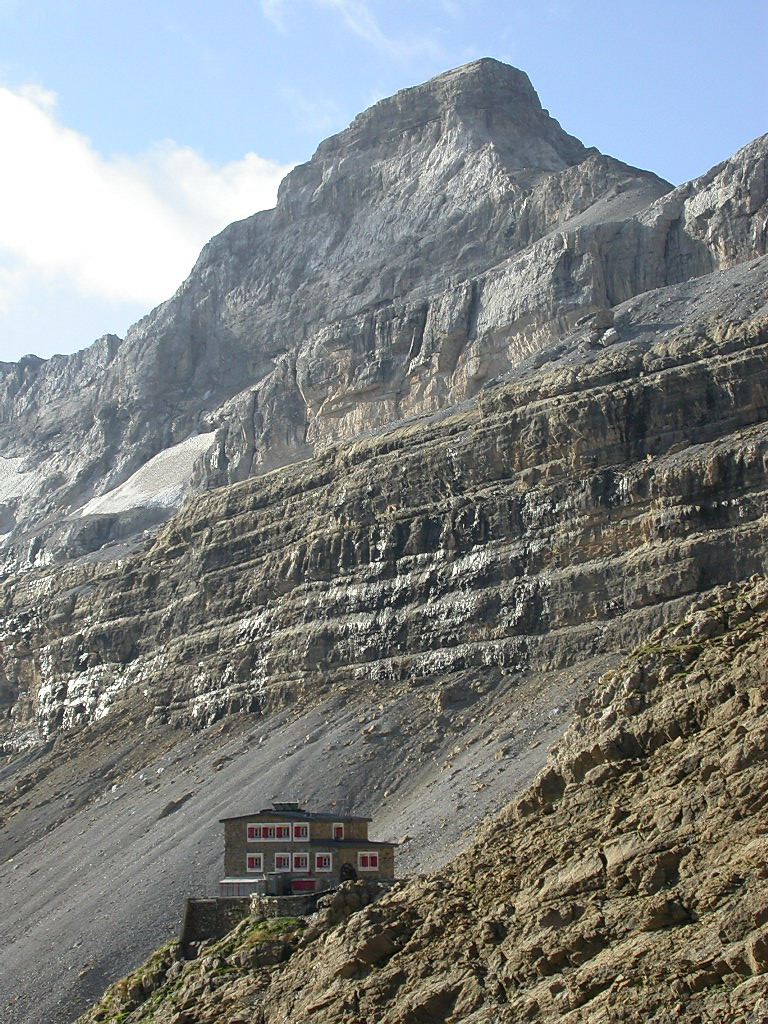
- The refuge in summer, in front of the Casque du Marboré, seen from the Col des Sarradets
- Interactive map of the Refuge des Sarradets area

General information
- Location: Near the Brèche de Roland
- Coordinates: 42.6958655°N 0.0332541°W
- Elevation: 2,587 m (8,488 ft)
- Owner: CAF de Tarbes

Website
- refugebrechederoland.ffcam.fr

Le refuge des Sarradets, or refuge de la Brèche de Roland is a mountain refuge in the Pyrenees. It is located in Gavarnie, near la brèche de Roland, in the Pyrenees National Park, at 2,587 m (8,488 ft) high.

== Etymology ==
The refuge took its names from le col des Sarradets (2,589 m (8,494 ft)) located just a few meters north-west and from le col de la Brèche de Roland located above it.

== History ==
The cirque de Gavarnie is one of the biggest sites in the Pyrenees and one of the most frequented. The well-known brèche de Roland gives access to the summits of the circus, to the Monte Perdido, to the Taillon, to the Aragonese valleys also. Excursionists who used to bivouac in the sector contentaient de l'abri Gaurier ou Villa Gaurier : a cave located in the wall, near la Fausse brèche, at the foot of pic Bazillac, discovered and arranged by abbot Ludovic Gaurier in 1906, who gave it its name and which was later arranged in 1911 by le Club alpin français, but which remained a stark comfort.

The need of a larger and more comfortable refuge was felt for a long while, when Robert Ollivier launched the project in 1942. The construction started in 1951, on the draughts of architect from Tarbes J. Martin. It was of a new kind at the time, in what can be considered as the third period of pyrenean refuges (housing style with shallow roofs and widely opened windows), in local ashlar and a copper-leaf-covered roof. It offered 60 places arranged in two dormitories of bunk-beds couchettes and a guide bedroom. Built by Castells enterprise of Bagnères-de-Bigorre, it was inaugurated in 1956 by Maurice Herzog, president of the Club alpin français. It was the first modern post-war refuge in the Pyrenees. In 1970, the refuge capacity extended to 90 places.

== Access ==
One can get there from Gavarnie : either by the route to the col des Tentes, then by the port de Boucharo on the Franco-Spanish border, or from the cirque de Gavarnie by l'échelle des Sarradets.
Other access : from Pouey-Aspé by le vallon des Tourettes, or even from Spain, by la brèche de Roland.

== Infrastructures ==
Le refuge des Sarradets offers 57 places and a restaurant service in the main season (May to September), 30 places out of season.
