= Cirque d'Estaubé =

Cirque in the central Pyrenees

Coordinates: 42°42′30″N 0°02′35″E

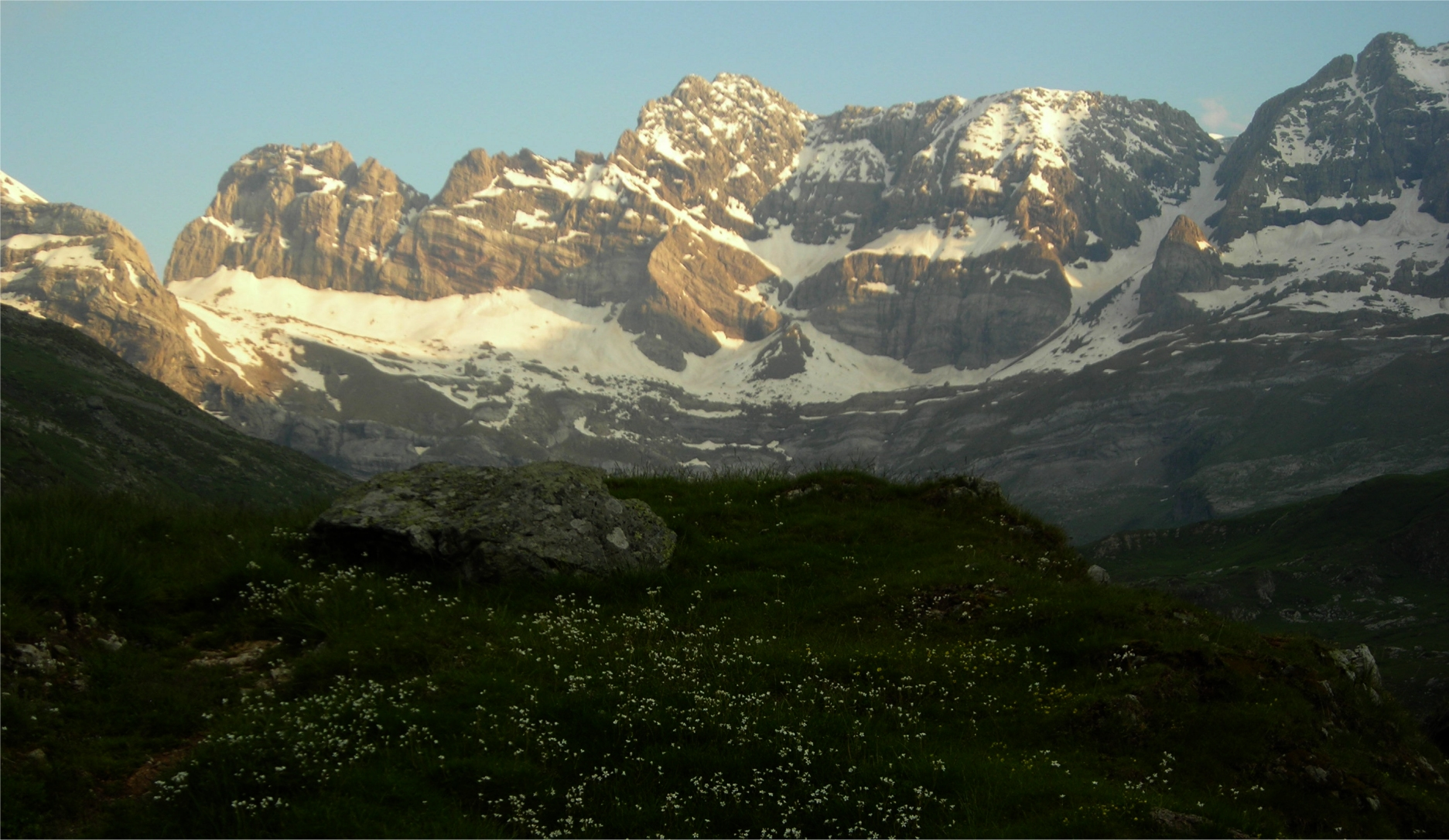
The Cirque d'Estaubé from the north

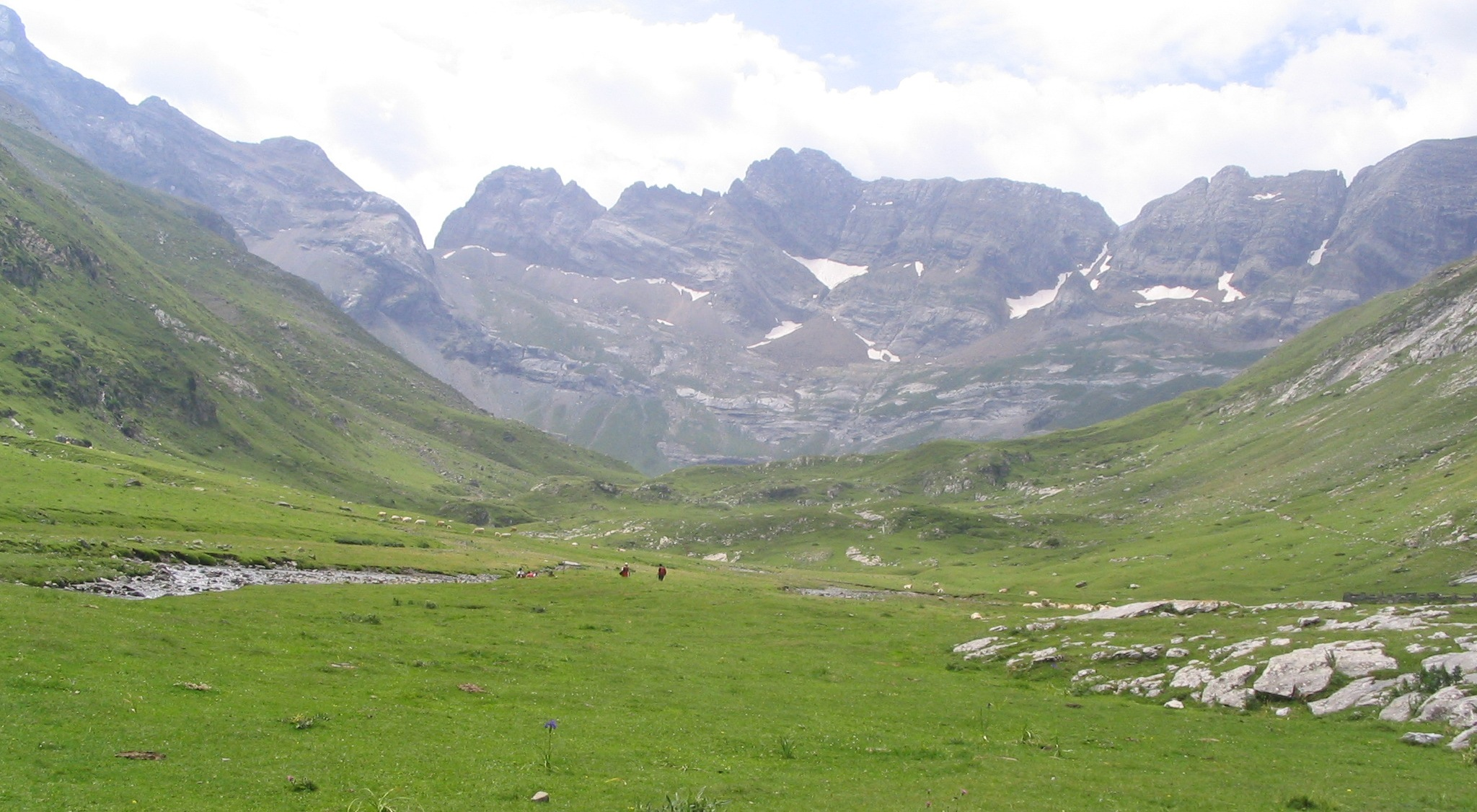
The Cirque d'Estaubé from the north

The Cirque d'Estaubé is a cirque in the central Pyrenees in the Pyrenees National Park, forming the frontier between France and Spain. The cirque lies 4 km to the east of its better known neighbour, the Cirque de Gavarnie, which is accessible via the Hourquette d'Alans (2,430 m); the Marboré valley is reached via the Brèche de Tuquerouye (Tuca Arroja) (2,666 m), where there is a small CAF hut.

The Gave d'Estaubé descends north from the cirque, first flowing into a small reservoir, the Barrage des Gloriettes (1,668 m), then into the main Héas valley.

== Principal summits ==
- Pic Rouge de Pailla (2,780 m/2,779 m)
- Grand Astazou (3,071 m /3,083 m)
- Pic de Tuquerouye (Pic de Tuquerouge) (2,819 m)
- Pic de Pinède (2,860 m/2,861 m)
- Pic Blanc (2,828 m)
- Pic de la Canau (2,766 m)
- Soum de Port Bieil (2,846 m)
- Pics d'Estaubé (2,810 m)
