= Pic de Marboré =

Summit in the Pyrenees on the Franco-Spanish border

- Marboré Peak
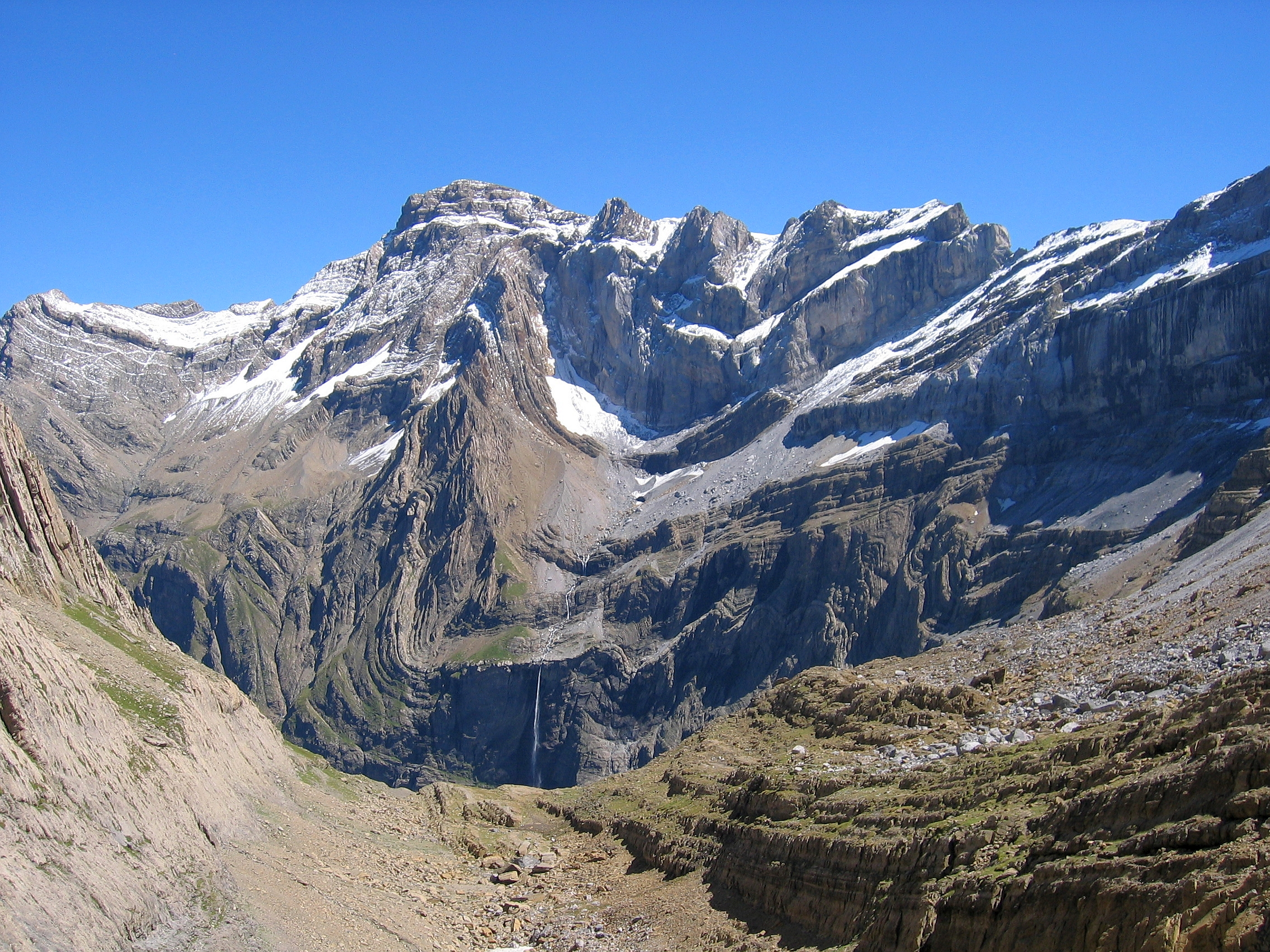
- Westside of Pic de Marboré. Below Glacier de la Cascade and Grande Cascade de Gavarnie

Highest point
- Elevation: 3,248 m (10,656 ft)
- Coordinates: 42°41′34″N 0°00′42″E

Geography
- Location within Pyrenees
- Location: France — Spain
- Région Communauté: Midi-Pyrénées; Aragon
- Département Province: Hautes-Pyrénées; Huesca
- Parent range: Monte Perdido Range (Pyrenees)

Climbing
- First ascent: 24 September 1865 by Henry Russell and Hippolyte Passet
- Easiest route: From Refuge de Goriz

Marboré Peak (Pic de Marboré, El Marboré) is a summit in the Pyrenees located on the Franco-Spanish border crest in the Monte Perdido Range.

== Topography ==
Marboré Peak is one of the peaks above Cirque de Gavarnie. It marks the border between the Pyrenees National Park (France) and the Ordesa y Monte Perdido National Park (Spain).

- French side : it is situated in the commune of Gavarnie in the Canton de Luz-Saint-Sauveur, Hautes-Pyrénées department, Midi-Pyrénées region.
- Spanish side : it is situated in the comarca of Sobrarbe, province of Huesca, autonomous community of Aragon.

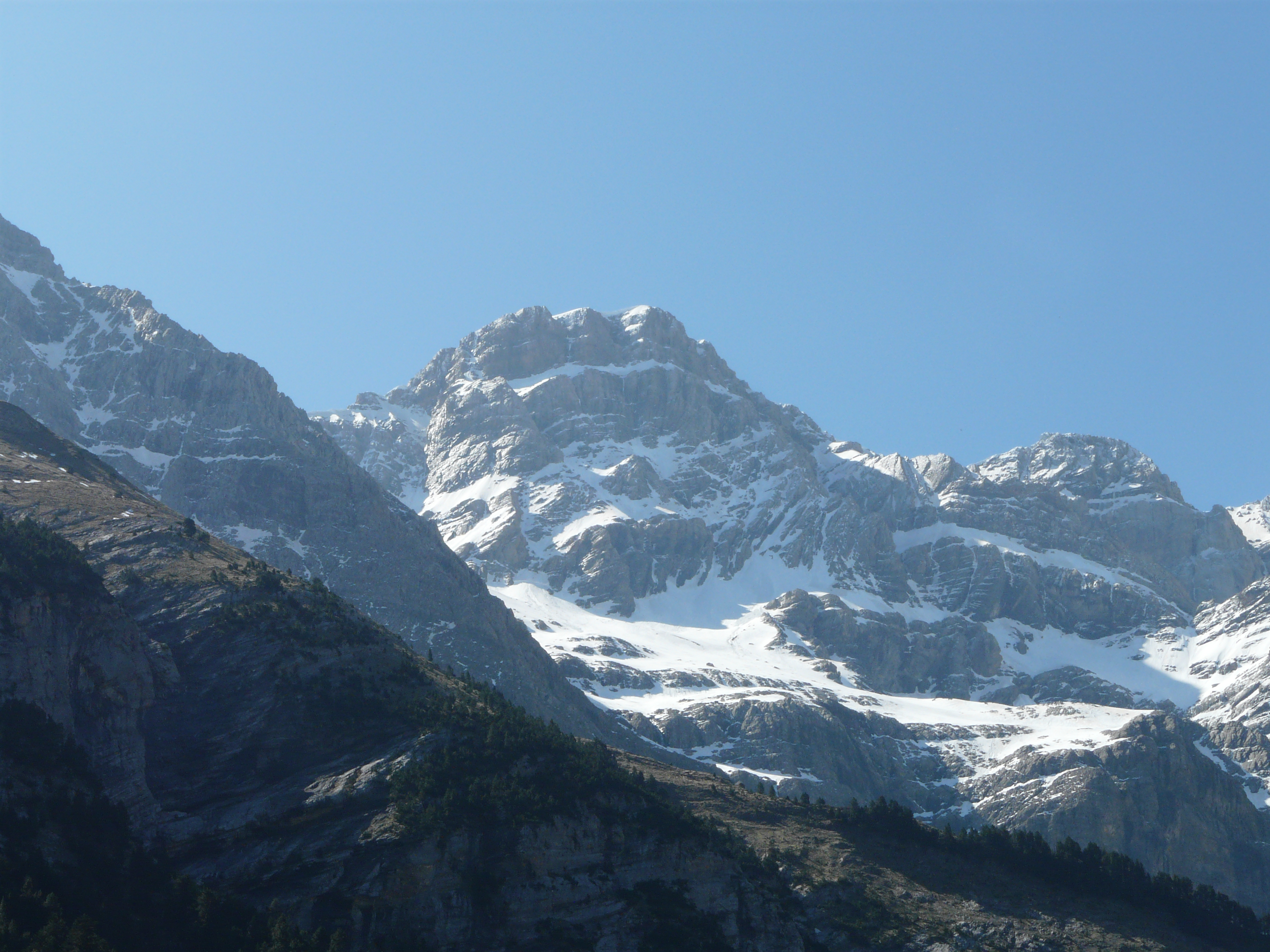
Marboré Peak from Belvédère, north of Cirque de Gavarnie.

== History ==
Philippe de Nemours in 1846 was perhaps the first to have climbed Marboré Peak, though we lack precision to attribute it to him.

== See also ==
- List of Pyrenean three-thousanders
