= Cascade Peaks =

Three mountain summits in the Pyrenees

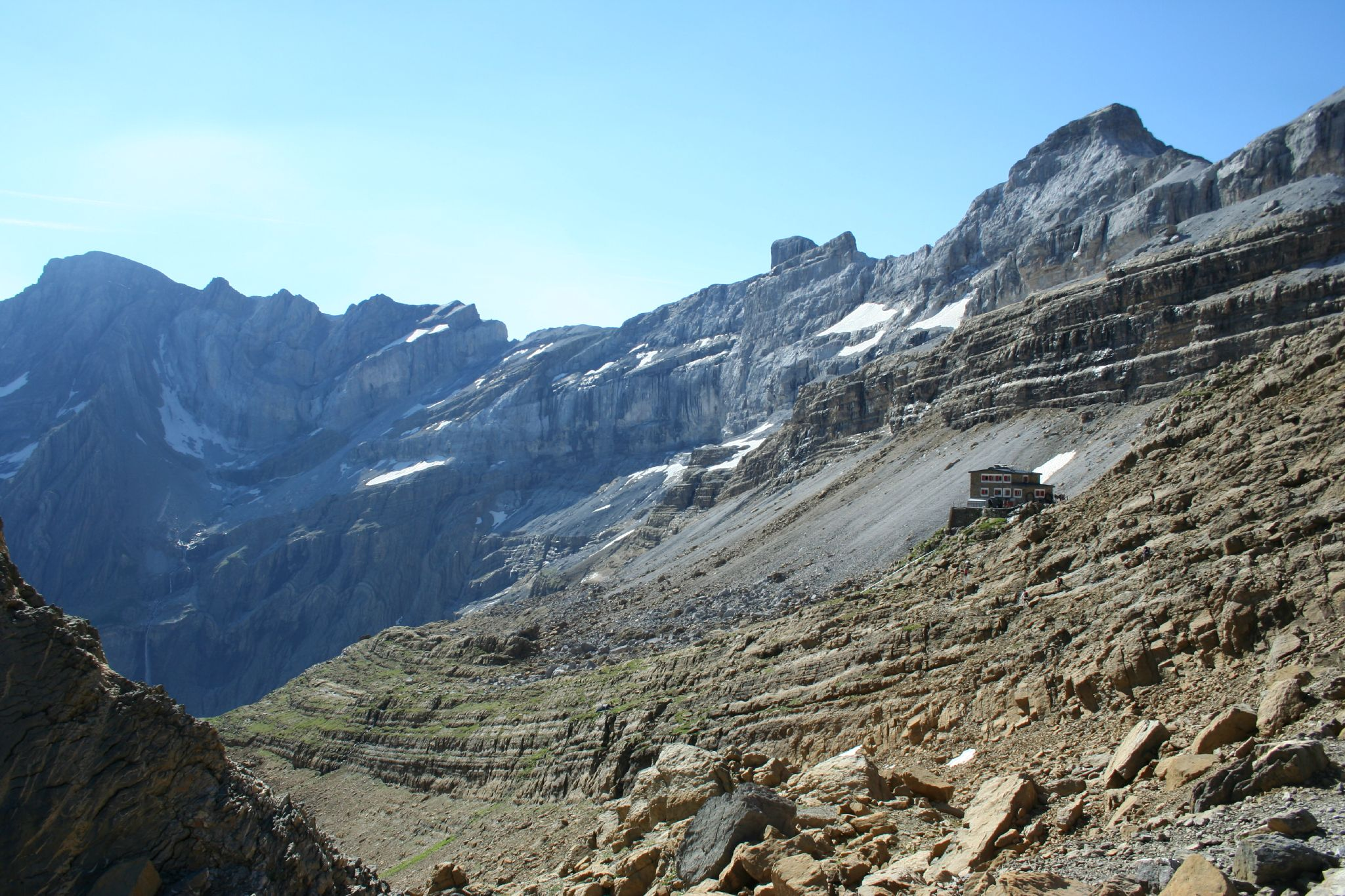
- looking south: the eastern, central and western Cascade peaks (second, third and fourth from left respectively)

Highest point
- Elevation: 3095, 3106, 3095
- Listing: List of Pyrenean three-thousanders
- Coordinates: 42°41′12″N 0°00′08″E

Geography
- Location within Pyrenees
- Location: France — Spain
- Région Communauté: Midi-Pyrénées; Aragon
- Département Province: Hautes-Pyrénées; Huesca
- Parent range: Pyrenees

Geology
- Rock age: Sélandien-Thanétien pour les roches
- Rock type(s): calcaires massifs à algues, calcaires à milioles, calcaires grèseux

The Cascade Peaks (Occitan: Pécs de Cascada) are three summits in the Monte Perdido Range of the Pyrenees, culminating at 3,161 m (10,371 ft) on the eastern peak. The central peak, known as Brulle, and the western peak are 3,106 m (10,190 ft) and 3,095 m (10,154 ft) high, respectively. The peaks are located on the 3,000 m French-Spanish borderline crest.

== Toponymy ==
The central summit was named in honor of Henri Brulle.

== Geography ==
The peaks are part of the Monte Perdido Range above the Cirque de Gavarnie. The peaks are located in the Hautes-Pyrénées department, in the Midi-Pyrénées region of France, and in Huesca province, in the Aragon region of Spain.

== Geology ==
The summit is composed of massive algae sediments, miliolitic sediments (eolianite) and sandstone sediments from the Eocene and Oligocene periods.
