= Roland's Breach =

Foot pass in the Pyrénées on the French–Spanish border

- La Brèche de Roland
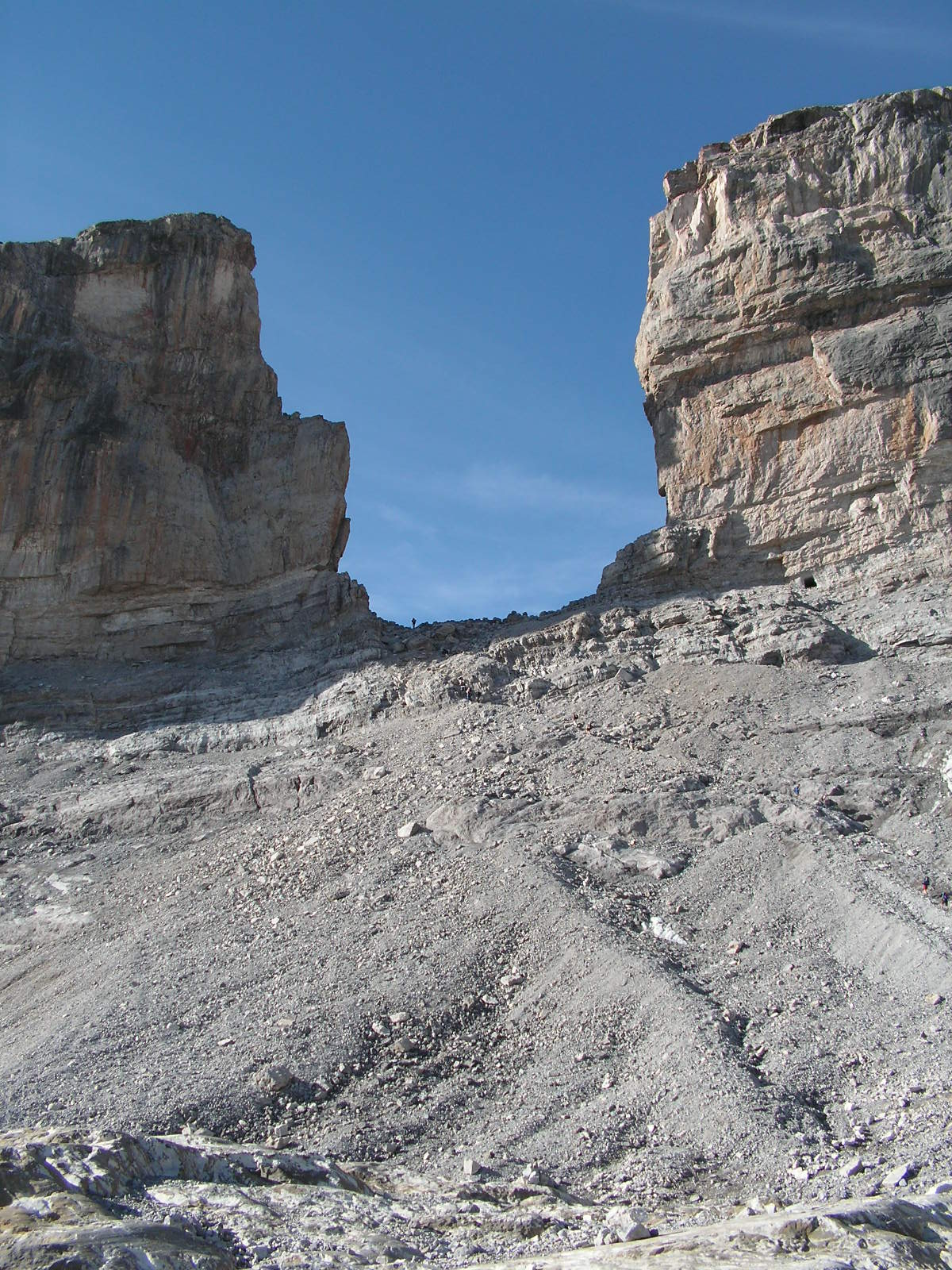
- Roland's Breach as seen from the French side.

- Location within Spain
- Elevation: 2,804 metres (9,199 ft)
- Traversed by: foot

Third Approach
- Location: Hautes-Pyrénées, France; Huesca, Spain
- Range: Pyrenees
- Coordinates: 42°41′27″N 00°02′01″W

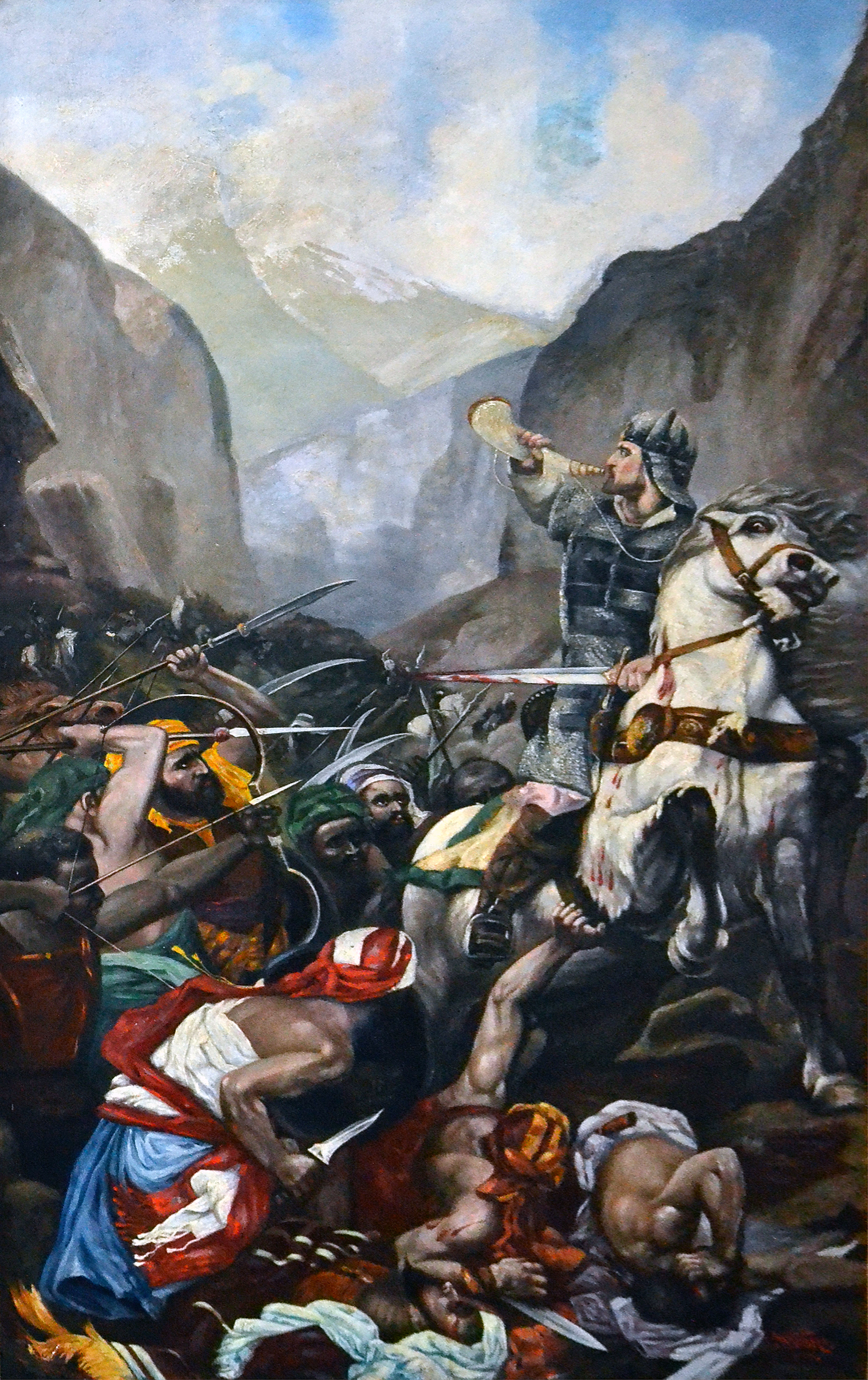
Roland blows his olifant (ivory hunting horn) to summon help in the midst of the Battle of Roncevaux as portrayed in The Song of Roland with Roland's Breach in the background

Roland's Breach (French: La Brèche de Roland; Spanish: La Brecha de Rolando; Aragonese: La Breca de Roldán; Basque: Errolanen Arraila; Catalan: La Bretxa de Rotllà; Occitan: Lo Brech de Roland) is the name of a natural gap, 40 m across and 100 m high, at an elevation of 2,804 m in the Pyrenees on the border of Aragón, northern Spain, and Hautes-Pyrénées, southwestern France.

The gap is situated in the Ordesa y Monte Perdido National Park on the Franco-Spanish border, close to the steep cliffs of the Cirque de Gavarnie.

According to one legend, Roland's Breach was cut by Count Roland with his sword Durendal in an attempt to destroy the sword, after being defeated during the Battle of Roncesvalles in 778. In a variant of one of the legends associated with Salto de Roldán, a rock formation about 25 km (16 mi) north of Huesca, Roland (Spanish: Roldán), the foremost of Charlemagne's paladins, was being hotly pursued by Saracens, the Muslim Arab occupiers of Spain. Cornered at Salto de Roldán, he escaped by leaping the chasm on horseback from one of the crags to the other; the horse died in the attempt. Roland continued northward on foot, and smote the Pyrenees with his sword to create Roland's Breach, so that he could see France one last time before he died.

The provenance of this myth is unclear as the Cirque du Gavarnie is approximately 150 km East South East from the Roncesvaux Pass where the legend of Roland is based.

The gap can be reached from the Refugio Sarradets, a nearby mountain shelter, in about an hour's climb.

== Gallery ==
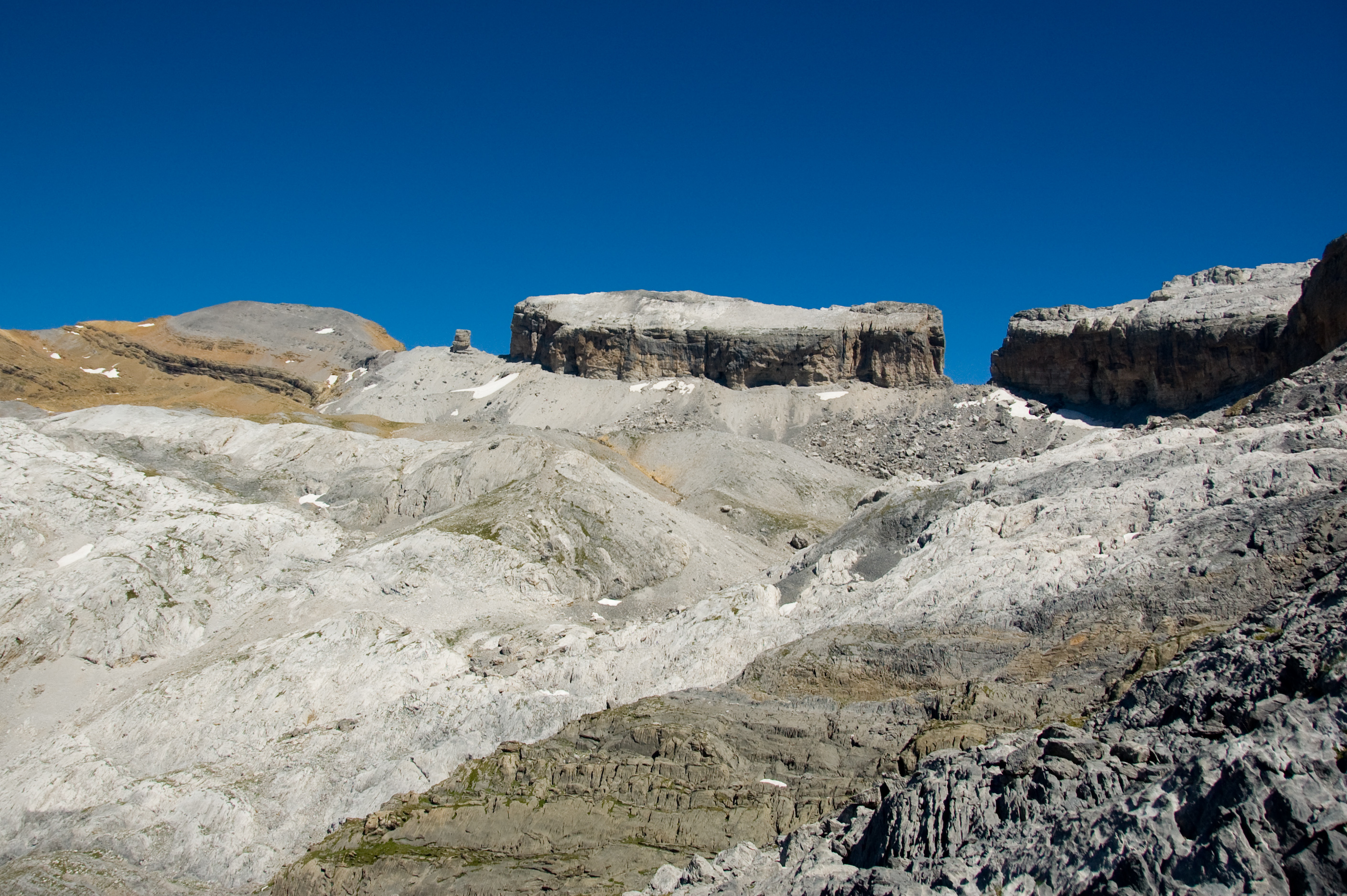
Roland's Breach as seen from the peninsular side

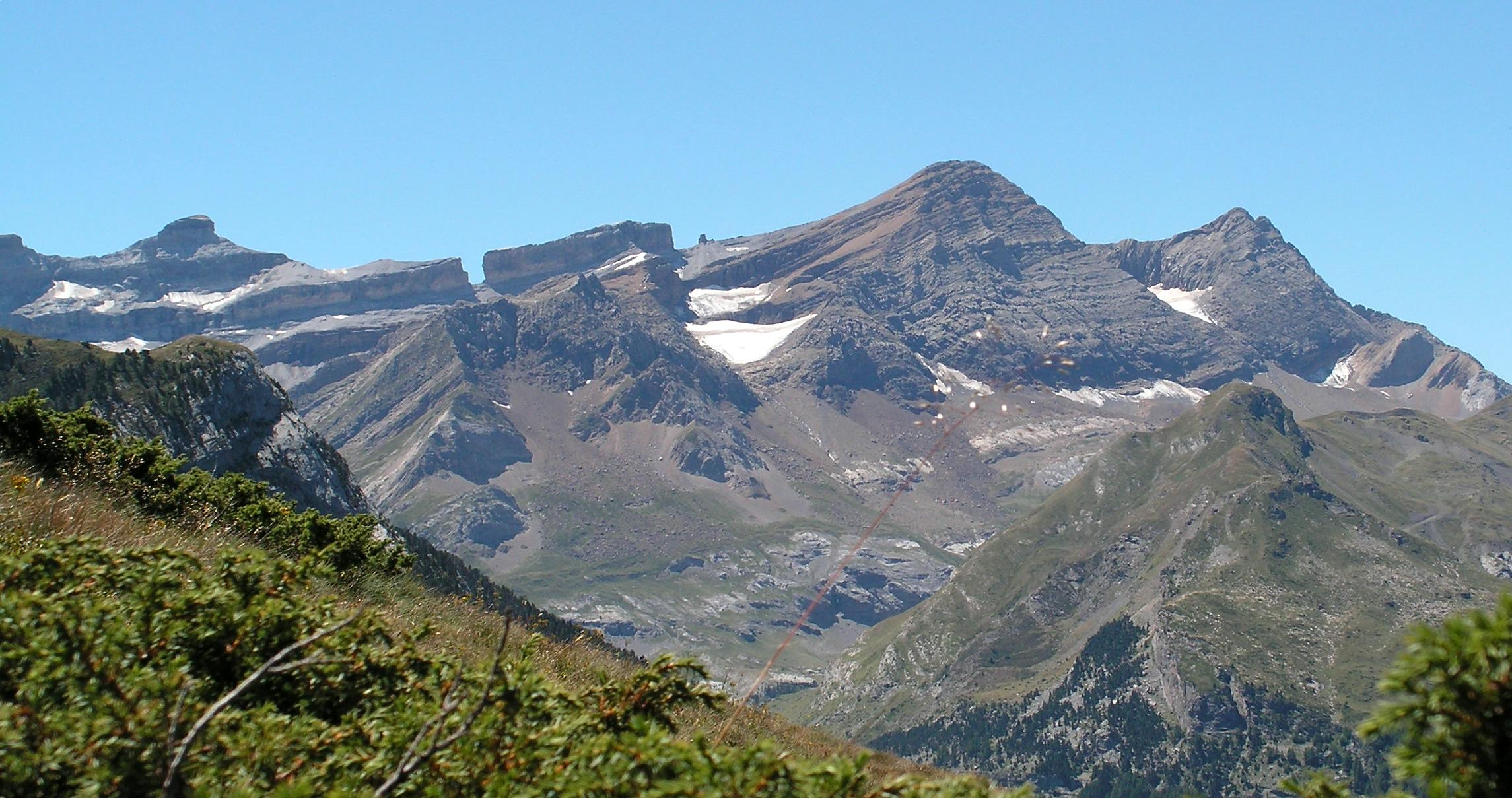
Roland's Breach, seen from a distance

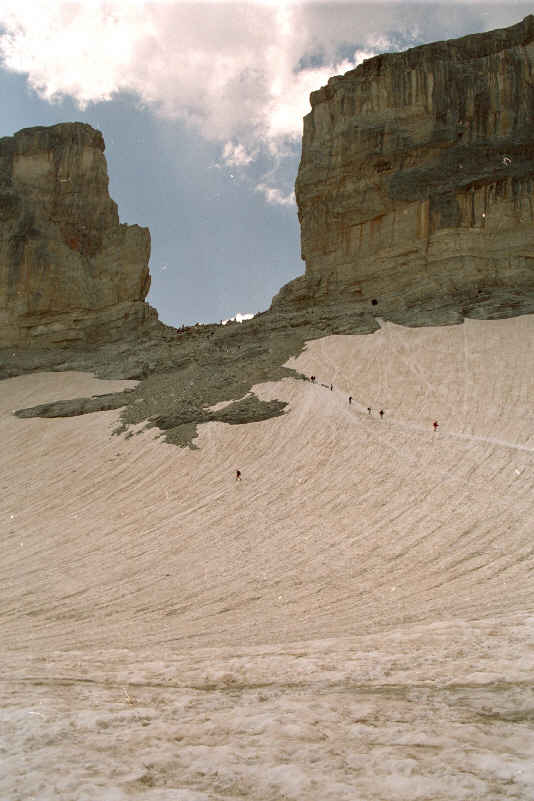
Roland's breach with some people passing through

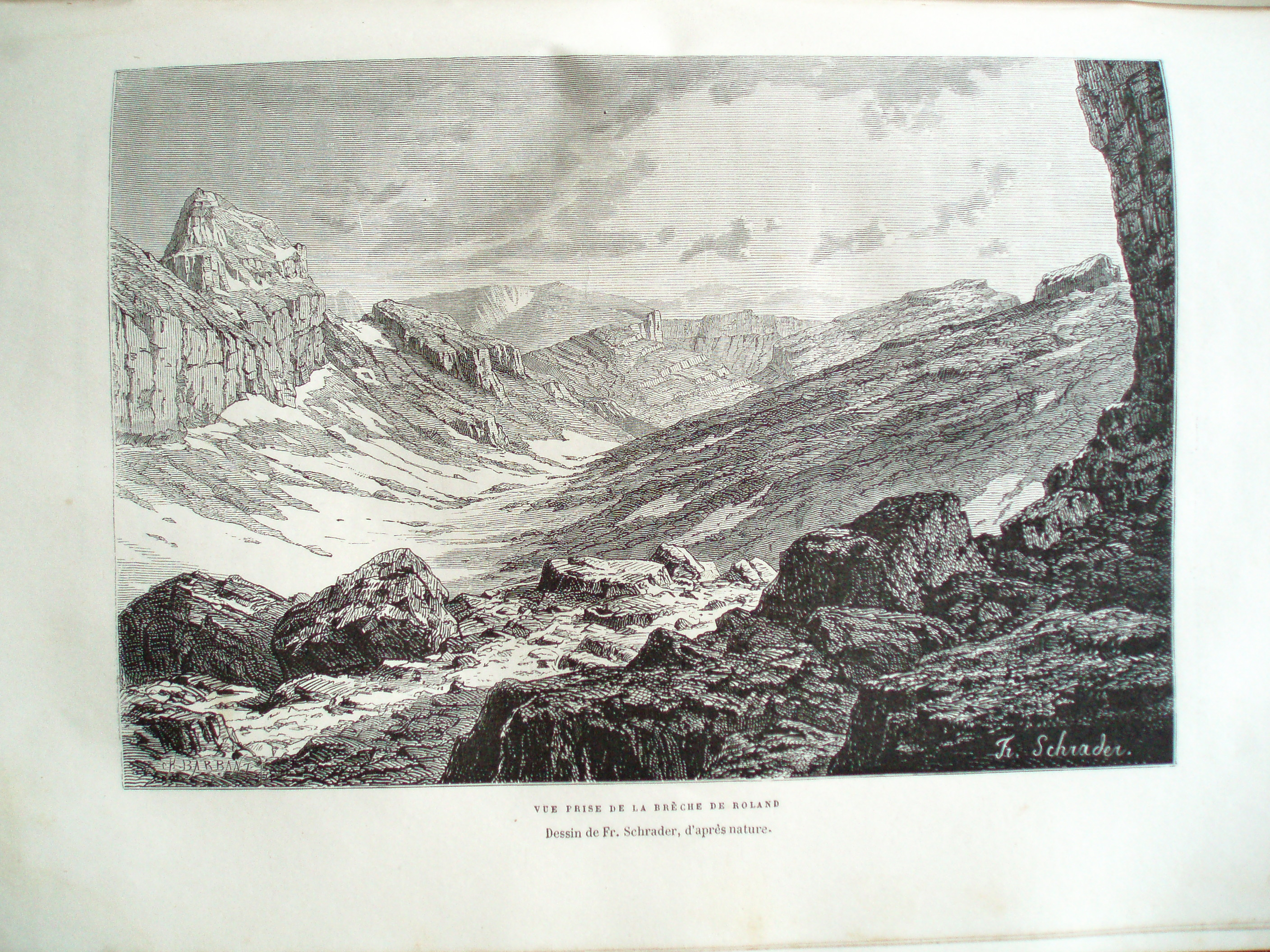
Drawing of Roland's Breach circa 1877
