= Cirque de Gavarnie =

Cirque in southwestern France

Coordinates: 42°41′49″N 0°00′29″W

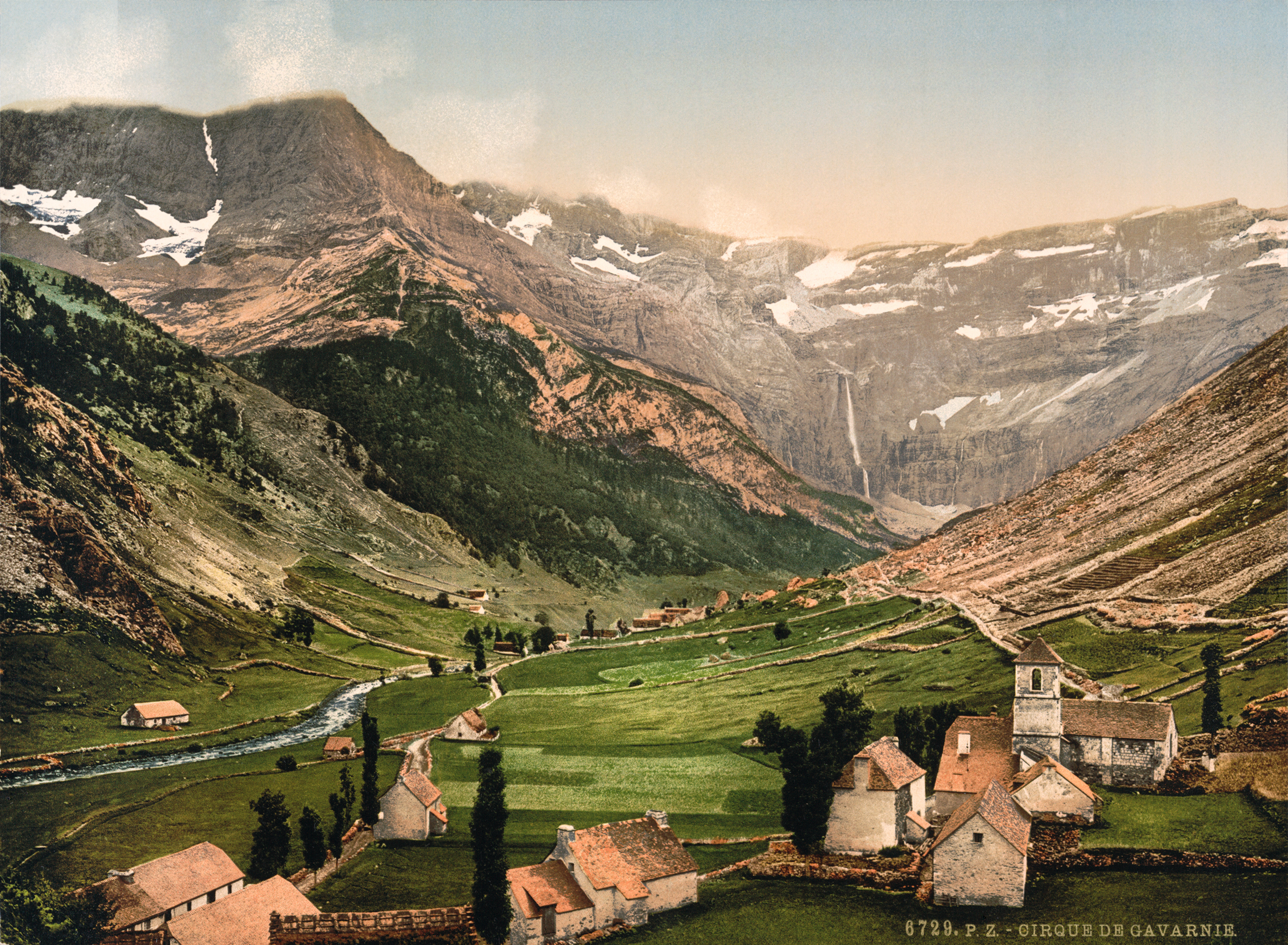
Photochrom of the Cirque de Gavarnie, circa 1900

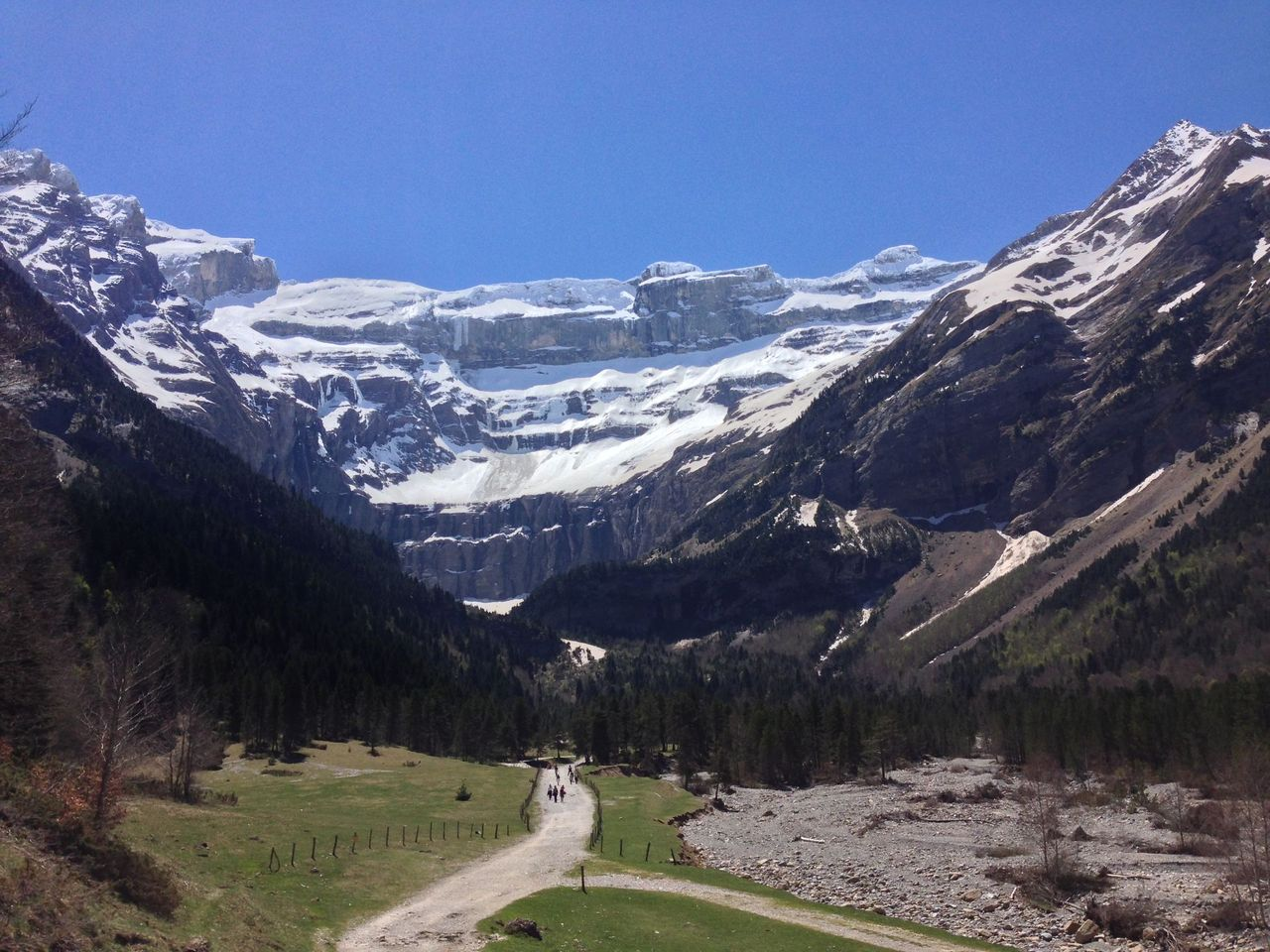
Snow on the walls of the Cirque de Gavarnie

The Cirque de Gavarnie (French pronunciation: [siʁk də ɡavaʁni]) is a vast cirque in the central Pyrenees, in southwestern France, close to the border of Spain. It is within the commune of Gavarnie, the department of Hautes-Pyrénées, and the Pyrénées National Park. Major features of the cirque are La Brèche de Roland (Roland's Pass) and the Gavarnie Falls.

It was described by Victor Hugo as "the Colosseum of nature" due to its enormous size and horseshoe shape resembling an ancient amphitheatre. The cirque was inscribed on the UNESCO World Heritage List in 1997 as part of the Pyrénées – Mont Perdu World Heritage Site.

The cirque is 800 m wide (at the deepest point) and about 3,000 m wide at the top. The rock walls that surround it are up to 1,500 metres (4,900 ft) above the floor of the Cirque.

During the warmer seasons of spring, summer and fall, there are a number of large meltwater falls that spill into the cirque. The largest of these is Gavarnie Falls, the second-highest waterfall in Europe. It descends some 422 metres (1,385 ft) over a series of steps before reaching the floor of the cirque.

There are also several passes and clefts between the peaks that form the rim of the Cirque. The largest is La Brèche de Roland, at 2,800 metres (9,200 ft) above sea level. According to legend, its sheer walls were cut into the mountain by the sword of the hero Roland, nephew to Charlemagne.

The cirque, and many others like it in the Pyrenees, was formed by the process of glacial erosion. The Cirque de Gavarnie's uniquely immense size was likely caused by repeated cycles of glacial scraping over millions of years.

A number of rare plants and animals live on the peaks at the upper rim of the Cirque de Gavarnie, protected on both the French and the Spanish sides by national parks. Martagon lilies grow in the pine forests. Saxifraga and other tiny alpine flowers cling to the rock faces. Pyrenean chamois, a type of mammal similar to goats or antelope, live among the crags.

== Panoramas ==
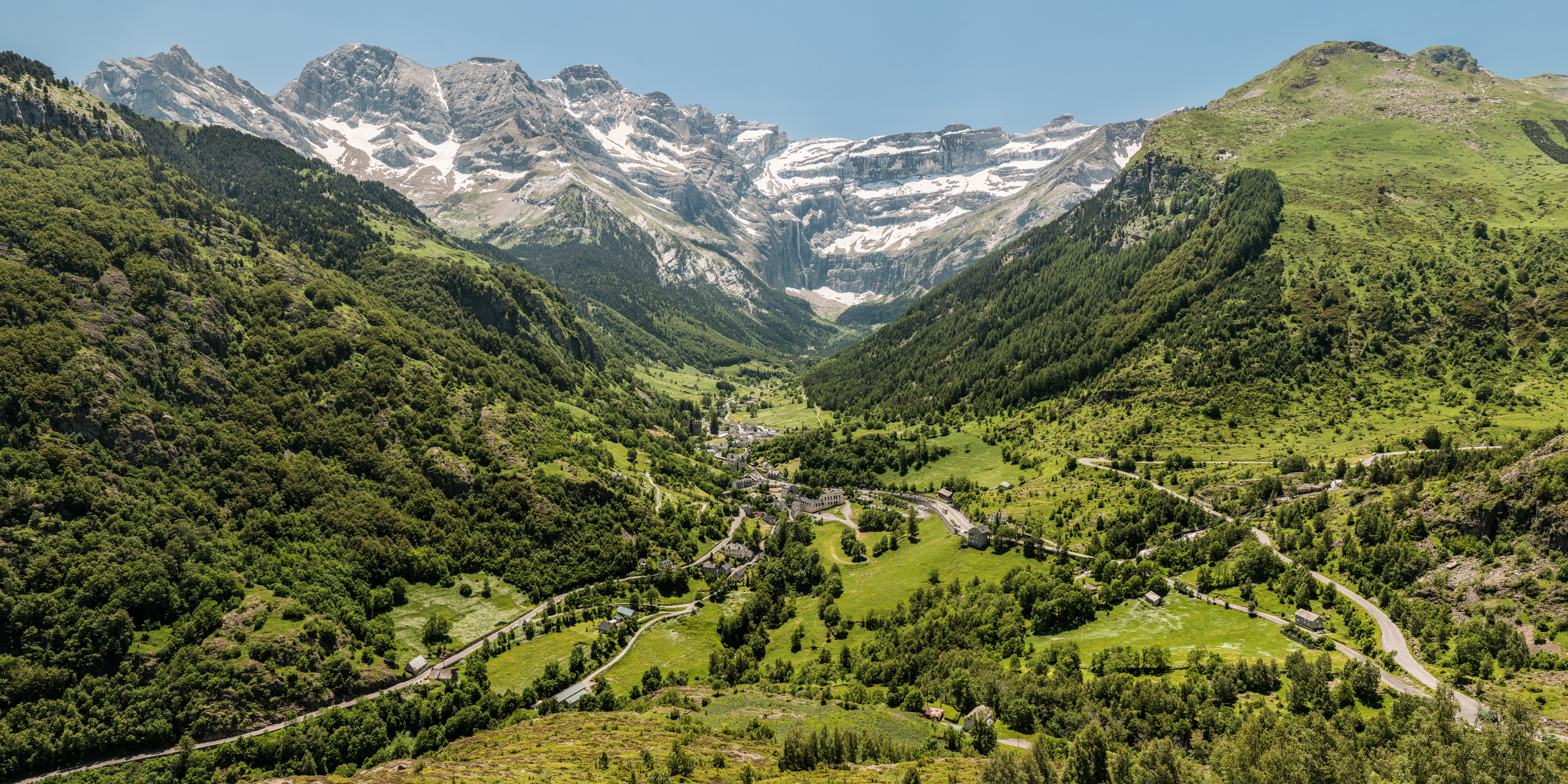
Village and cirque

Closer view of Gavarnie Falls

== See also ==
- Cirque d'Estaubé
- Pic de Marboré
