= Gavarnie =

Commune in Haute-Pyrénées, France

- Part of Gavarnie-Gèdre
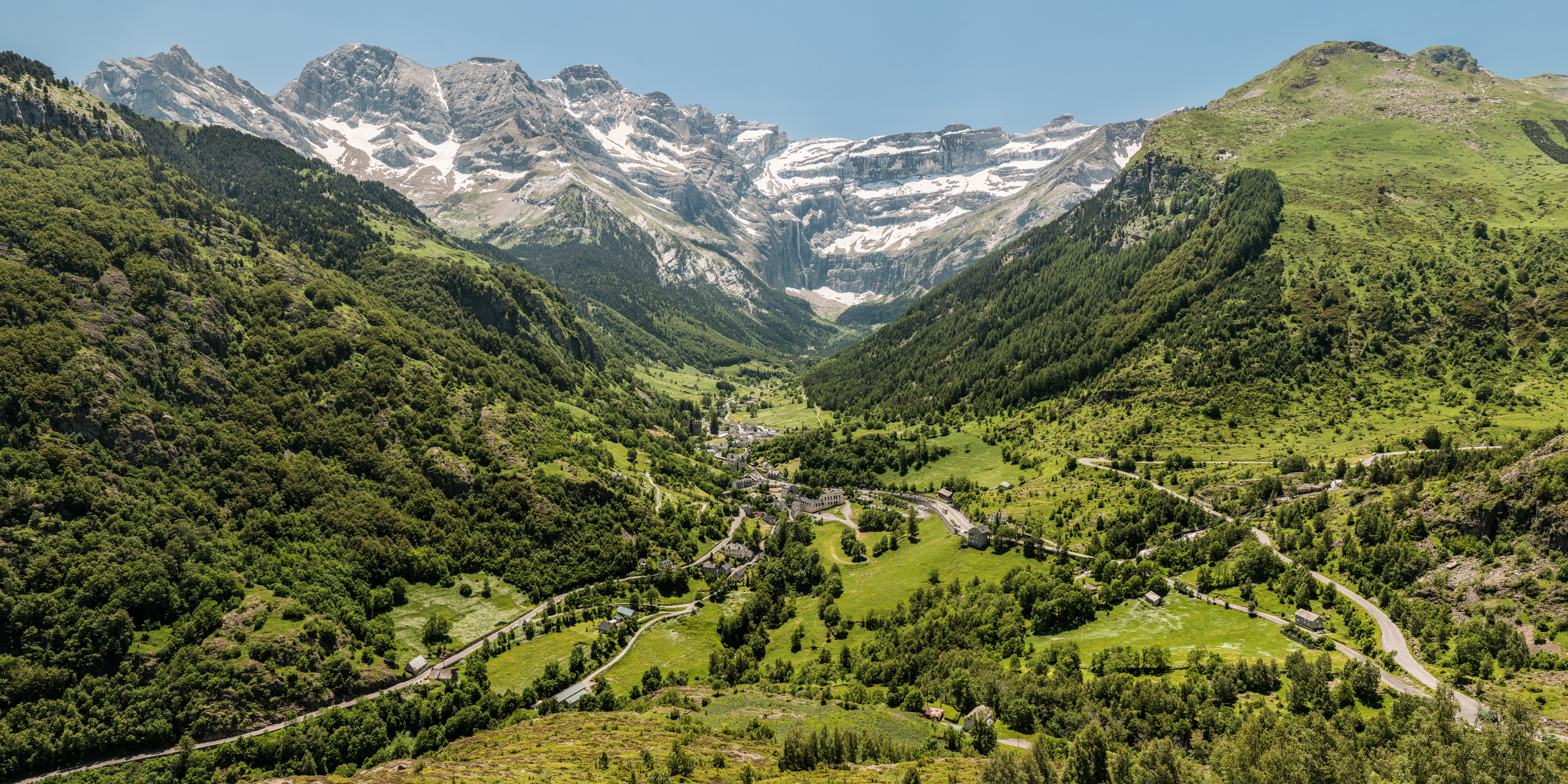
- The commune of Gavarnie, and Cirque de Gavarnie

- Coat of arms
- Location of Gavarnie
- Location within France Location within Occitanie
- Coordinates: 42°44′06″N 0°00′36″W
- Country: France
- Region: Occitania
- Department: Hautes-Pyrénées
- Arrondissement: Argelès-Gazost
- Canton: La Vallée des Gaves
- Commune: Gavarnie-Gèdre
- Area^{1}: 82.54 km^{2} (31.87 sq mi)
- Highest elevation: 3,298 m (10,820 ft)
- Lowest elevation: 1,200 m (3,900 ft)
- Population (2022): 108
  - Density: 1.31/km^{2} (3.39/sq mi)
- Time zone: UTC+01:00 (CET)
  - Summer (DST): UTC+02:00 (CEST)
- Postal code: 65120
- ^{1} French Land Register data, which excludes lakes, ponds, glaciers > 1 km^{2} (0.386 sq mi or 247 acres) and river estuaries.

Gavarnie (French pronunciation: [ɡavaʁni]; Occitan: Gavarnia) is a former commune in the Hautes-Pyrénées department, Southwestern France. On 1 January 2016, it was merged into the new commune of Gavarnie-Gèdre. Gavarnie is known for the Cirque de Gavarnie, and the Gavarnie Falls in it, part of the UNESCO World Heritage Site Pyrénées – Mont Perdu.

The Prime Meridian passes through Gavarnie, including at its southernmost point in France – the commune touches Aragon, Spain.

== Climate ==
On average, Gavarnie experiences 114.8 days per year with a minimum temperature below 0 °C (32.0 °F), 6.2 days per year with a minimum temperature below −10 °C (14.0 °F), 12.4 days per year with a maximum temperature below 0 °C (32.0 °F), and 3.8 days per year with a maximum temperature above 30 °C (86.0 °F). The record high temperature was 35.6 °C (96.1 °F) on 11 August 2025, while the record low temperature was −18.1 °C (−0.6 °F) on 8 February 2012.

Climate data for Gavarnie (1991–2020 normals, extremes 2007–present)
| Month | Jan | Feb | Mar | Apr | May | Jun | Jul | Aug | Sep | Oct | Nov | Dec | Year |
|---|---|---|---|---|---|---|---|---|---|---|---|---|---|
| Record high °C (°F) | 20.4 (68.7) | 19.8 (67.6) | 21.7 (71.1) | 25.3 (77.5) | 32.4 (90.3) | 34.5 (94.1) | 34.5 (94.1) | 35.6 (96.1) | 32.2 (90.0) | 28.1 (82.6) | 22.2 (72.0) | 18.6 (65.5) | 35.6 (96.1) |
| Mean daily maximum °C (°F) | 6.1 (43.0) | 6.7 (44.1) | 9.6 (49.3) | 12.5 (54.5) | 15.7 (60.3) | 19.9 (67.8) | 23.0 (73.4) | 23.6 (74.5) | 19.7 (67.5) | 15.8 (60.4) | 9.4 (48.9) | 7.2 (45.0) | 14.1 (57.4) |
| Daily mean °C (°F) | 1.6 (34.9) | 1.6 (34.9) | 4.2 (39.6) | 7.1 (44.8) | 10.0 (50.0) | 13.8 (56.8) | 16.6 (61.9) | 17.0 (62.6) | 13.4 (56.1) | 10.2 (50.4) | 4.9 (40.8) | 2.7 (36.9) | 8.6 (47.5) |
| Mean daily minimum °C (°F) | −2.9 (26.8) | −3.4 (25.9) | −1.2 (29.8) | 1.7 (35.1) | 4.4 (39.9) | 7.8 (46.0) | 10.1 (50.2) | 10.4 (50.7) | 7.2 (45.0) | 4.6 (40.3) | 0.5 (32.9) | −1.8 (28.8) | 3.1 (37.6) |
| Record low °C (°F) | −16.0 (3.2) | −18.1 (−0.6) | −13.8 (7.2) | −9.8 (14.4) | −4.6 (23.7) | −0.2 (31.6) | 1.9 (35.4) | 2.2 (36.0) | −2.3 (27.9) | −7.1 (19.2) | −12.3 (9.9) | −14.6 (5.7) | −18.1 (−0.6) |
| Average precipitation mm (inches) | 127.4 (5.02) | 105.8 (4.17) | 116.4 (4.58) | 148.9 (5.86) | 136.8 (5.39) | 124.6 (4.91) | 96.6 (3.80) | 83.8 (3.30) | 85.6 (3.37) | 180.9 (7.12) | 168.1 (6.62) | 96.5 (3.80) | 1,471.4 (57.94) |
| Average precipitation days (≥ 1.0 mm) | 11.5 | 10.3 | 12.5 | 12.4 | 12.5 | 11.3 | 8.1 | 7.6 | 8.8 | 9.6 | 12.2 | 9.5 | 126.3 |
Source: Meteociel

== See also ==
- Communes of the Hautes-Pyrénées department
