= Pyrénées National Park =

French national park in Hautes-Pyrénées and Pyrénées-Atantiques

- Parc national des Pyrénées
- IUCN category II (national park)
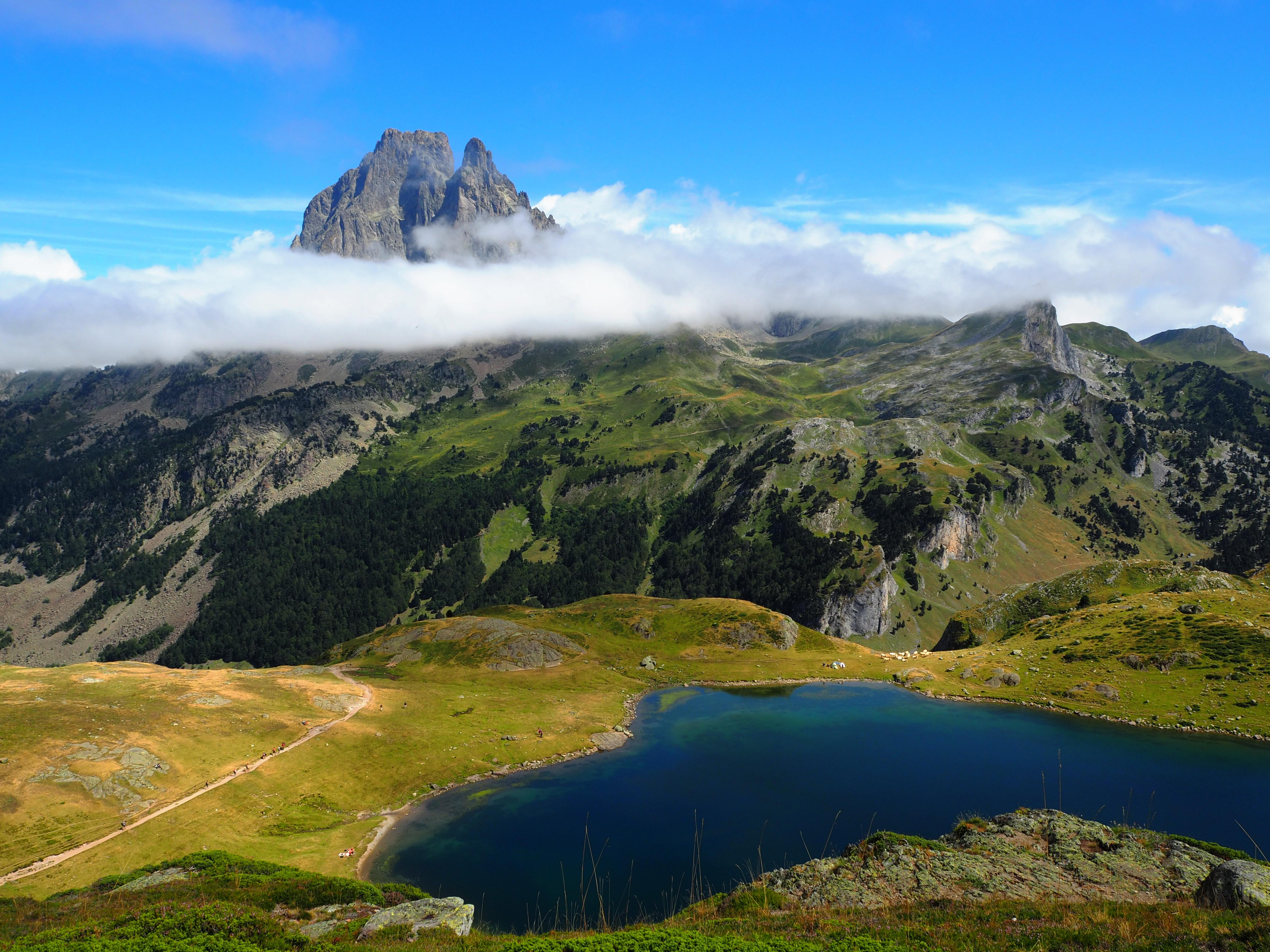
- Pic du Midi d'Ossau

- Location within France
- Location: Pyrenees, France
- Nearest city: Luz-Saint-Sauveur
- Coordinates: 42°49′39″N 0°10′33″W
- Area: 458 km^{2} (177 sq mi)
- Established: 23 March 1967
- Governing body: Parcs nationaux de France

UNESCO World Heritage Site
- Official name: Pyrénées - Mont Perdu
- Type: Mixed
- Criteria: iii, iv, v, vii, viii
- Designated: 1997 (21st session)
- Reference no.: 773
- Region: Europe and North America
- Extensions: 1999

Pyrénées National Park (French: Parc national des Pyrénées; Occitan: Parc Nacional dels Pireneus) is a French national park located within the departments of Hautes-Pyrénées and Pyrénées-Atlantiques. The park is located along the border of France and Spain along the Pyrenees Mountains, with a scenic landscape offering a variety of outdoor activities including hiking, skiing, mountain climbing and observing wildlife.

== Description ==
Located in the Pyrenees mountains, Pyrenees National Park protects many limestone landforms, including karst valleys and caves. Repeated glaciations within the Quaternary created multiple cirques such as the immense Cirque de Gavarnie and large U-shaped valleys within the park. The limestone originated from the Cretaceous and Eocene periods. Tectonic uplift has created deep canyons, and, during the Quaternary, repeated glaciations carved cirques and large U-shaped valleys.

The park was created in 1967 as a natural heritage site without barriers or fences where animals are totally free. Devoted to preserving biodiversity and landscapes, as well as studying wildlife and plant species, the park is home to 70 different species of mammals. Threatened species found in the park include the lammergeier, Pyrenean desman, Pyrenean chamois, and capercaillie. A small population of bears also inhabit the park. At least 124 plant species have been observed within the national park, including 25 that are endemic to the Pyrenees mountains.

The eastern portion of the national park was inscribed on the UNESCO World Heritage List in 1997, forming part of the French section of the Pyrénées – Mont Perdu World Heritage Site that straddles the border between France and Spain. The park also borders on the Lacs de Carnau.

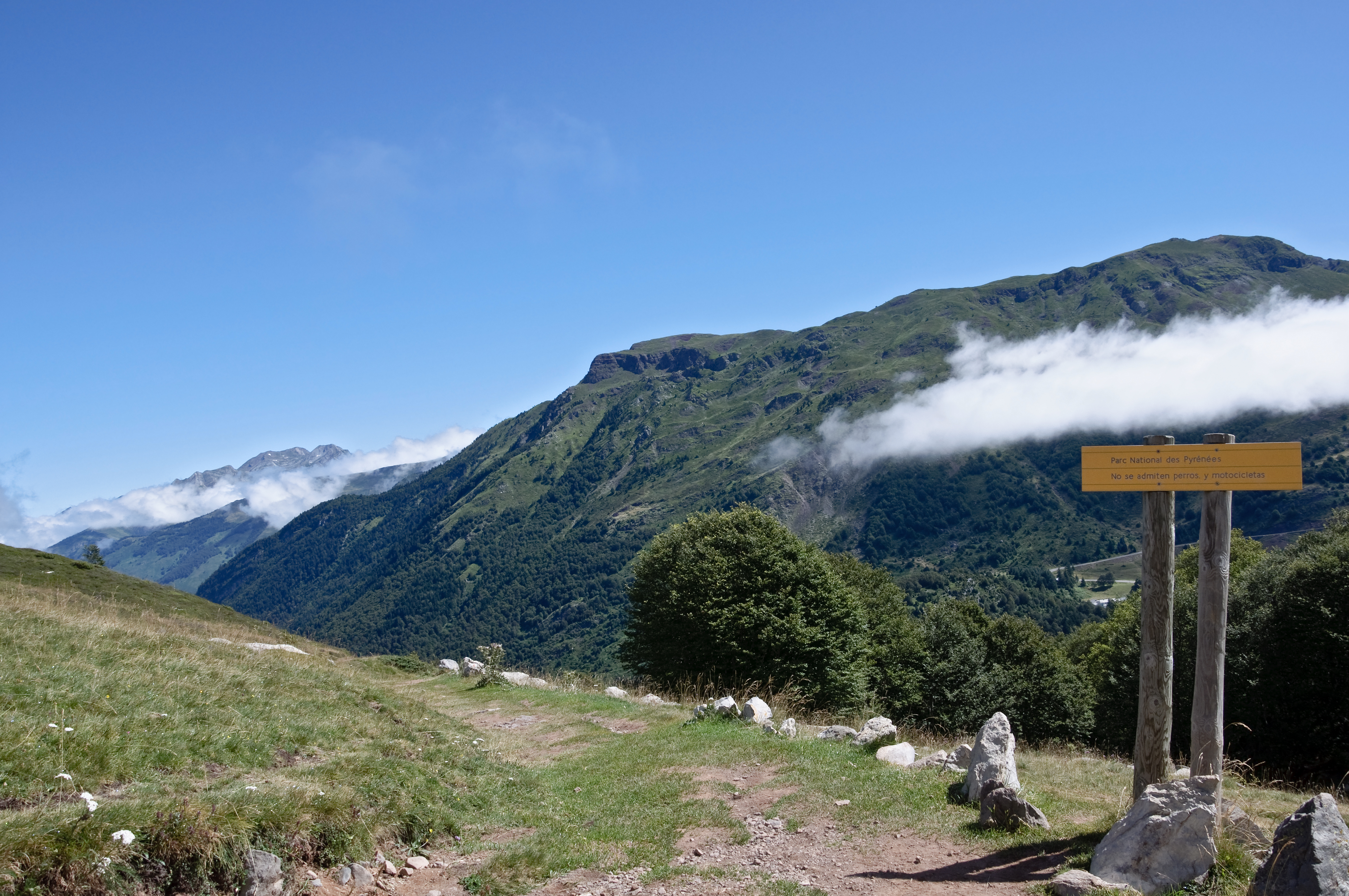
Pyrénées National Park, here on the foothills of the Aspe Valley, on the border between France and Spain

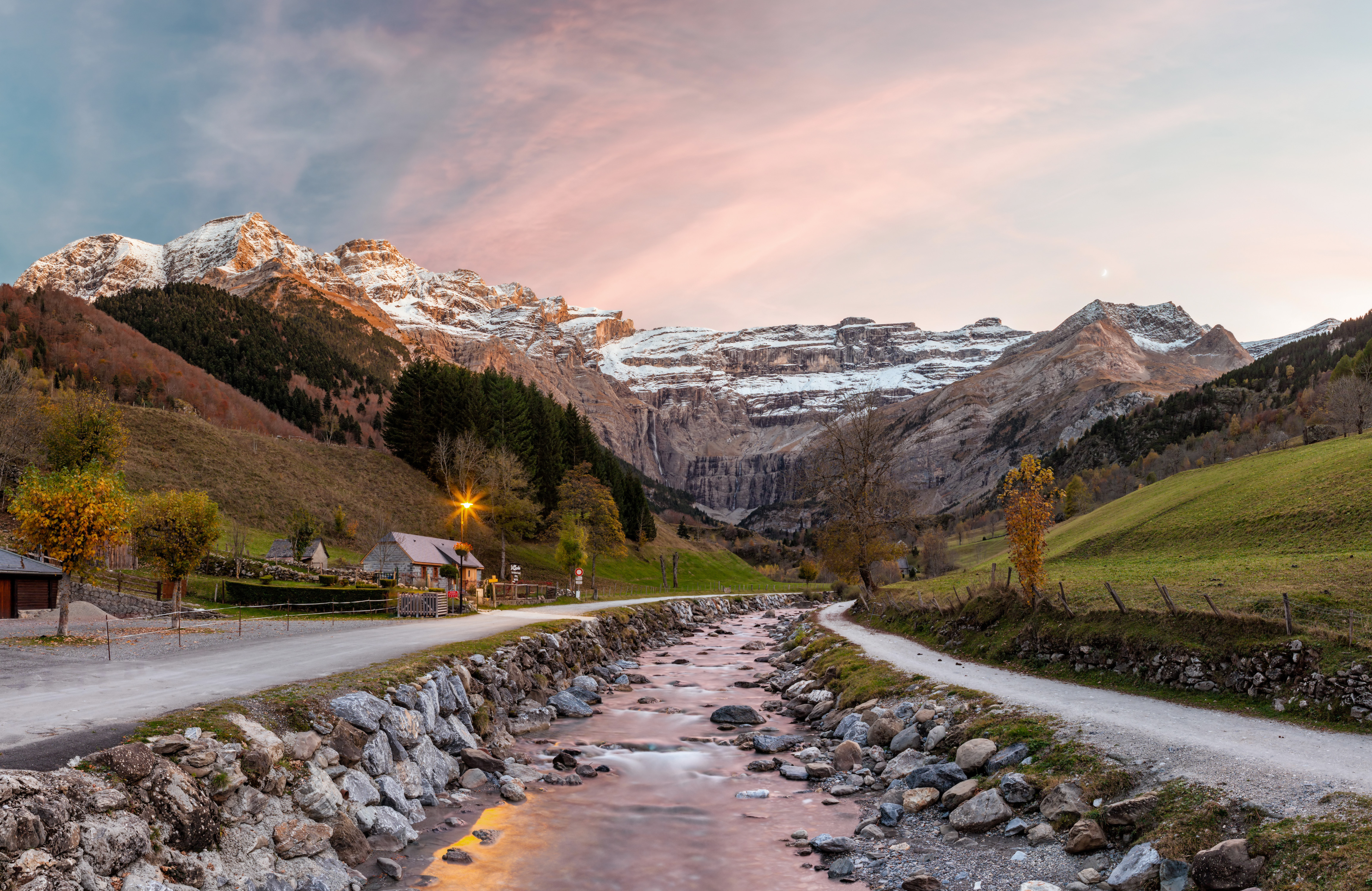
The Pyrénées National Park, Cirque de Gavarnie, Gave de Gavarnie river

== See also ==
- List of national parks of France
