= Néouvielle Massif =

Mountain in France

- French: Massif du Néouvielle; Spanish: Macizo del Néouvielle
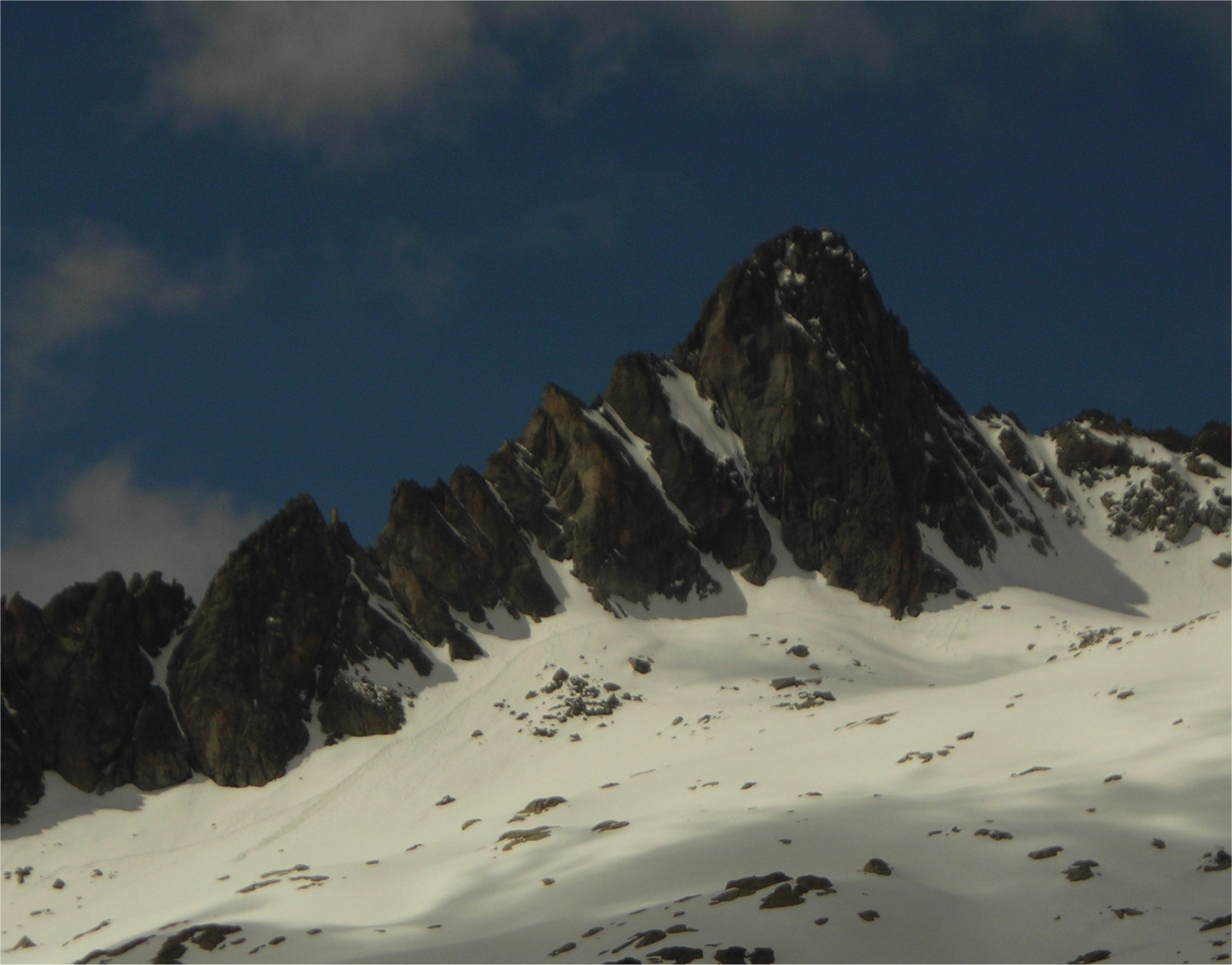
- North side of Pic Ramougn from Hourquette d'Aubert

Highest point
- Peak: Pic Long
- Elevation: 3,192 m (10,472 ft)

Geography
- Country: France
- Region: Hautes-Pyrénées
- Range coordinates: 42°48.1′N 0°6′E
- Parent range: Pyrenees

Geology
- Rock type: Granite

The Néouvielle Massif (Occitan: massís de Néouvielle) is a group of mountains in the Pyrenees in France notable for its lakes and its microclimate. Much of the massif lies within the 23.13 square kilometres (8.93 mi^{2}) Néouvielle National Nature Reserve; this nature reserve was created in 1936 and is the third oldest in France.

The name Néouvielle ('old snow') derives from nèu vielha in the Occitan language – nèu meaning 'snow' and vielha meaning 'old' – and is thought to refer to the many glaciers that used to belong to the region.

== Néouvielle group ==
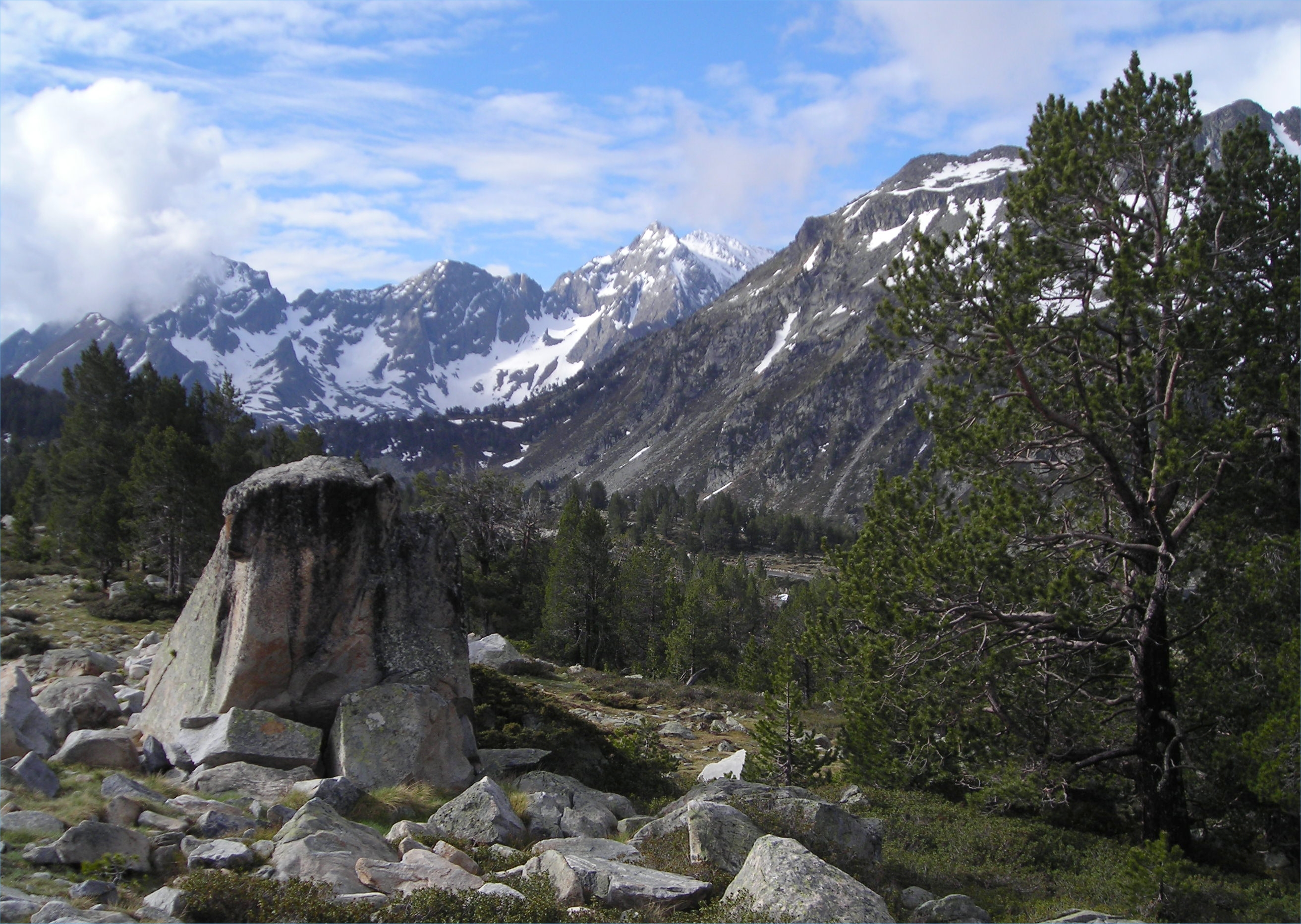
Pic Méchant (background, centre) and Pic de Bugatet (background, in cloud) from above lac d'Aubert, with granite boulders and mountain pine

This group is centred on Pic de Néouvielle and is composed of heavily glaciated granite peaks.

- Pic de Néouvielle 3,091 m
- Trois Conseillers 3,039 m
- Turon de Néouvielle 3,035 m
- Pic Ramougn 3,011 m
- Pic de la Coume de l'Ours 2,855 m
- Pic de la Morèle 2,679 m
- Pic de la Hèche Castet 2,568 m
- Pic Prudent 2,287 m

== Pic Long-Campbieil group ==
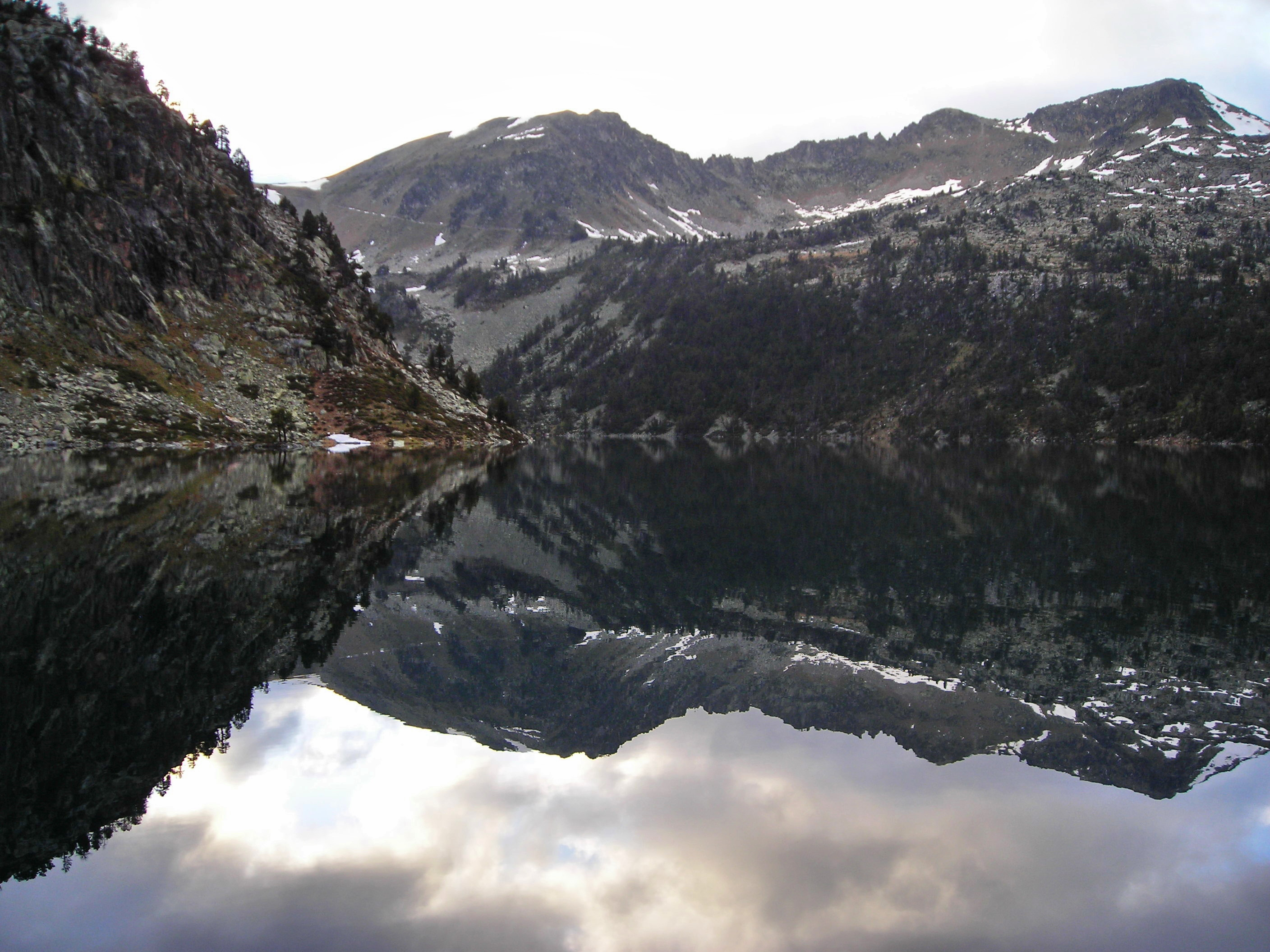
Lac d'Aubert and Pic de Madamète (top right)

This group lies to the south of the Néouvielle group and is outside the 'réserve naturelle du Néouvielle'.

- Pic Long 3,192 m
- Campbieil 3,173 m
- Pic Badet 3,160 m
- Pic Maou 3,074 m
- Pic Maubic 3,058 m
- Pic de Buggaret 3,031 m
- Pic de Crabounouse 3,021 m
- Dent d'Estibère 3,017 m
- Estaragne 3,006 m
- Pic des Halharisès 2,995 m
- Pic Méchant, 2,930 m
- Pic de Bugatet 2,877 m

== Flora and fauna ==
The massif enjoys a variety of climatic influences and supports a wide variety of plant and animal species, including Pinus mugo subsp. uncinata (a subspecies of mountain pine) which grows in abundance between elevations of 1,600–2,300 m, cross-leaved heath, the arctic marsh cinquefoil, 94 species of lichen and several Mediterranean species, as well as some 22 species of sphagnum moss in the bogs within the park.

Approximately 370 species of animal are found in the reserve, including capercaillie, grey partridge, golden eagle, griffon vulture, isard, midwife toad, ptarmigan and Seoanei's viper.

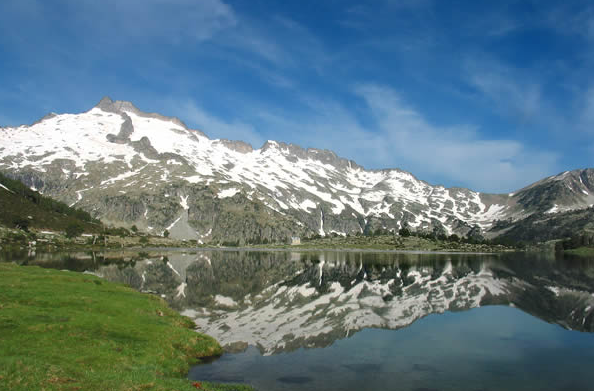
East side of Pic de Néouvielle from lac d'Aumar

== Lakes ==
- Lac d'Aubert
- Lac d'Aumar
- Lac de Cap de Long
- Lac de Madamète
- Lac d'Orédon
- Lac de l'Oule
