= Campbieil =

Summit in the French Pyrenees

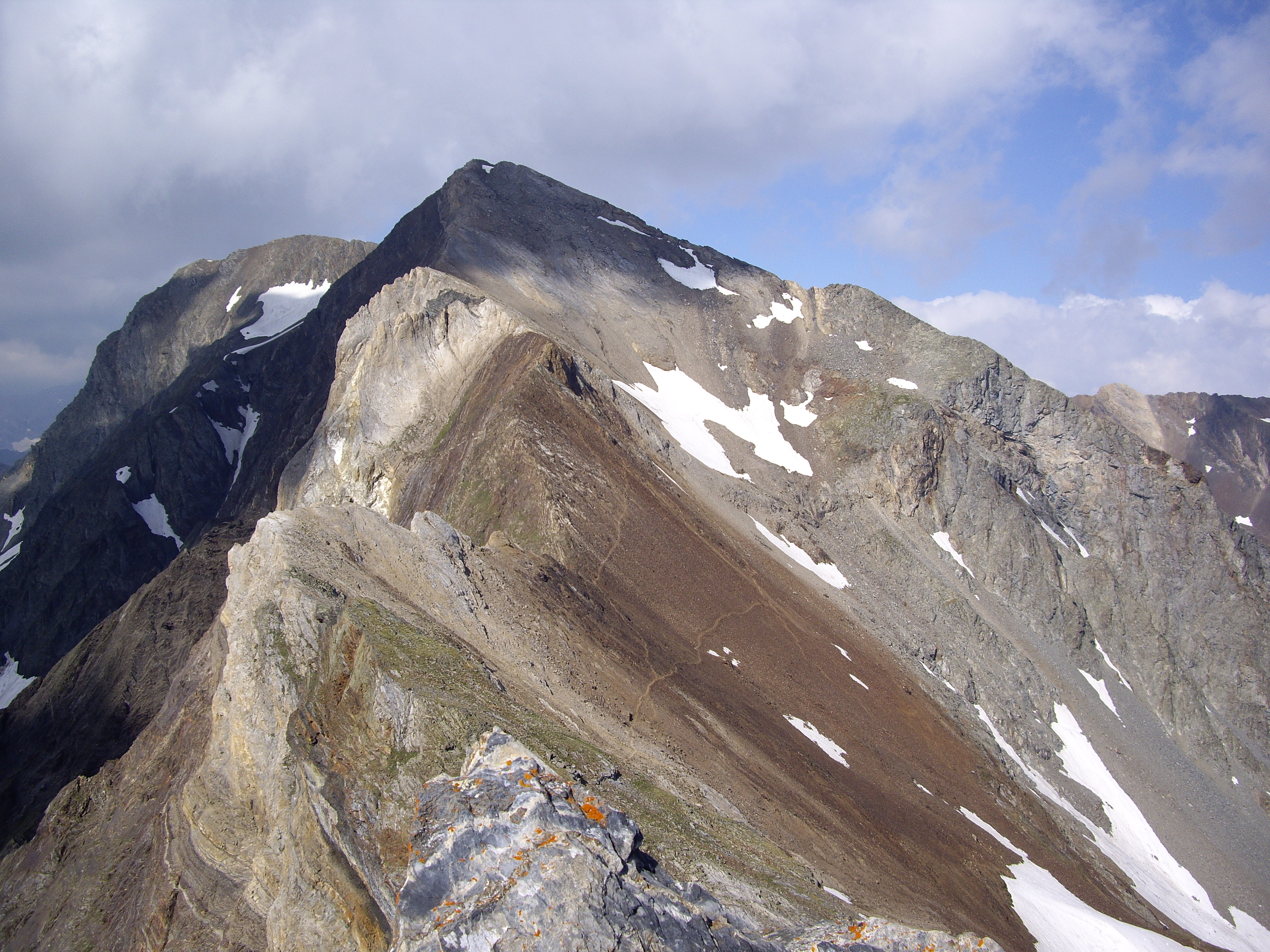

Highest point
- Elevation: 3,173 m (10,410 ft)
- Coordinates: 42°47′32″N 0°07′10″E

Geography
- Location within France
- Location: Midi-Pyrénées, Hautes-Pyrénées, France
- Parent range: Néouvielle Massif (Pyrenees)

Climbing
- First ascent: 1848 by Loupot

The Campbieil is a summit in the French Pyrenees, culminating at a height of 3,173 m (10,410 ft). It is located in the Néouvielle Massif, included in the Pyrenees National Park of which it constitutes the second highest summit, after the pic Long (3,192 m (10,472 ft)).

== History ==
The first recorded ascent dates from 1848, by Captain Loupot who was carrying out triangulation works. Of very easy access by its western slope, that of Gèdre, the summit is frequented by sheep and isards and has ever been ambled by shepherds and hunters.

== Access ==
The most frequented access route runs today through the north, by a path which presents no difficulty (besides its steepness), from the Cap de Long dam.

Another slightly shorter route is accessible to the east, which consists of reaching the Estaragne by ascending the stream hollow of Estaragne from the D 929, then walking along the crest. It too presents no major difficulty, at least not on a clear summer day.

== See also ==
- List of Pyrenean three-thousanders
