= Pic de Néouvielle =

Mountain in the French Pyrenees

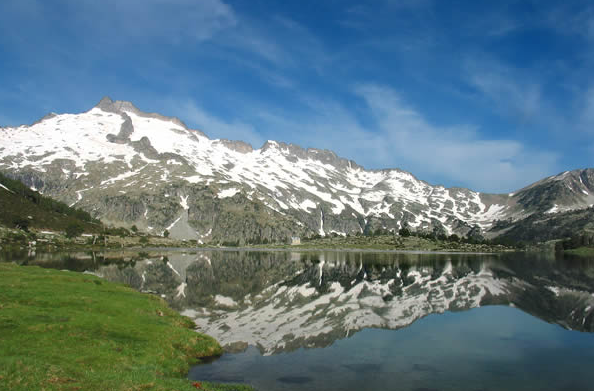
- East side of Pic de Néouvielle from lac d'Aumar

Highest point
- Elevation: 3,091 m (10,141 ft)
- Isolation: 3.99 km (2.48 mi)
- Listing: List of mountains of France
- Coordinates: 42°50′08″N 0°06′54″E

Geography
- Location within Pyrenees
- Location: Hautes-Pyrénées, France
- Parent range: Pyrenees

Geology
- Mountain type: Granite

Climbing
- First ascent: 10 July 1847 by Vincent de Chausenque and guide Bastien Teinturier
- Easiest route: From lac d'Aubert (F)

Pic de Néouvielle (3,091 m) is a mountain in the Néouvielle Massif in the French Pyrenees.

It is located in the commune of Saint-Lary-Soulan within the department of the Hautes-Pyrénées, and lies on the border between the Pyrenees National Park and the Néouvielle National Nature Reserve. The name Pic de Néouvielle derives from nèu vielha, meaning 'old snow' in the Occitan language; the inhabitants of the vallée d'Aure call the peak la montagne d'Aubert.

The mountain has four corries, some containing small glaciers, separated by sharp granite ridges. Its south face is between 400 and 500 m high, and dominates the deep valley of the lac de Cap-de-Long. The shapely Pic Ramougn lies on its east ridge.

The first known ascent of Pic de Néouvielle was made on 10 July 1847 by Vincent de Chausenque and the Barèges guide Bastien Teinturier.
