= Trois Conseillers =

Mountain in France

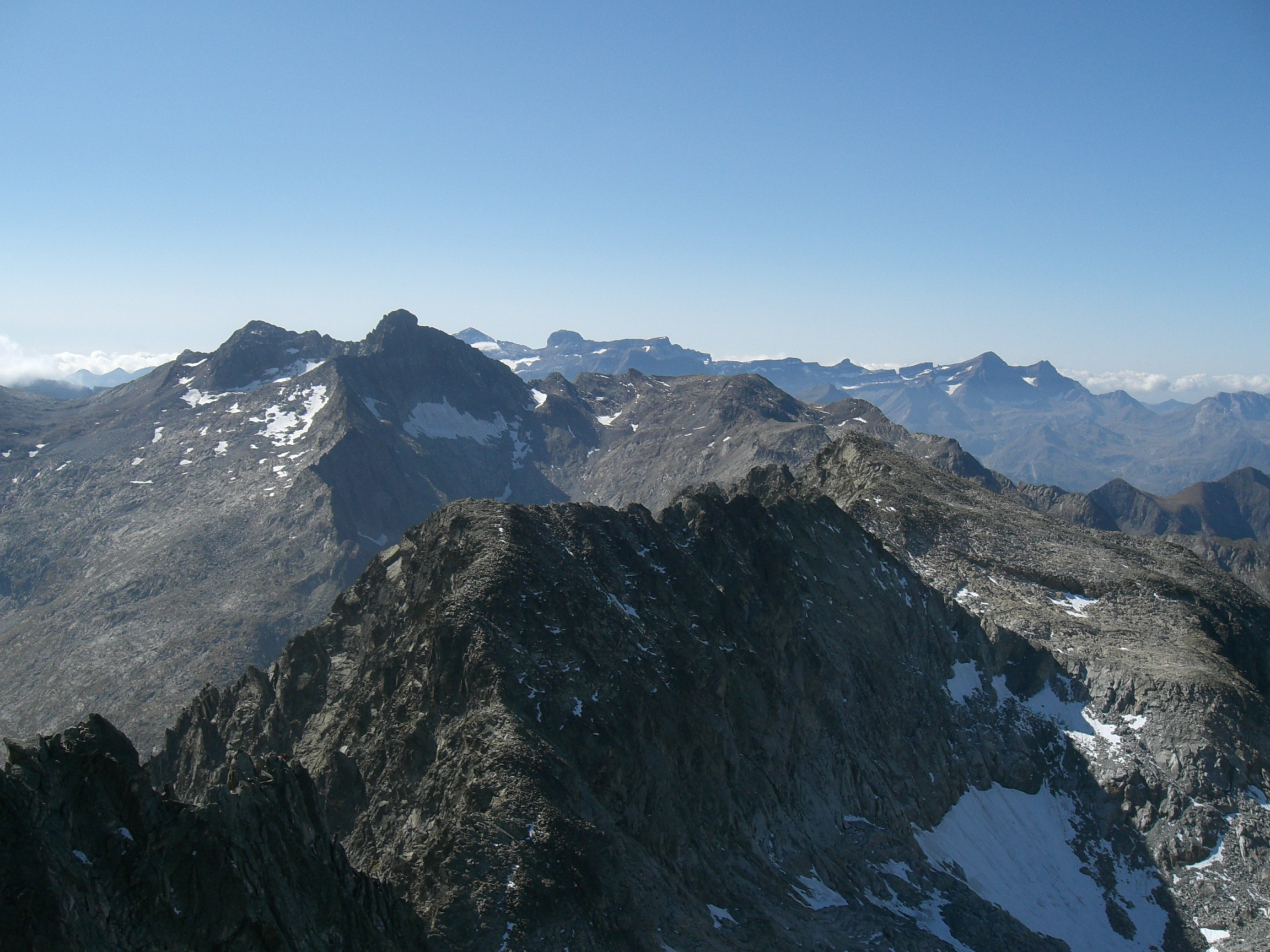
- View of Trois Conseillers with pic Long (au second plan) et en fond le Mont-Perdu Massif.

Highest point
- Elevation: 3,039 m (9,970 ft)
- Coordinates: 42°49′53″N 0°06′56″E

Geography
- Location within Pyrenees
- Location: Hautes-Pyrénées, France
- Parent range: Néouvielle Massif (Pyrenees)

Climbing
- Easiest route: Par le barrage de Cap de Long

The Trois Conseillers (Occitan: Tres Conselhièrs) is a summit in the French Pyrenees, culminating at 3,039 metres (9,970 ft).

== Geography ==
It is located in the Hautes-Pyrénées department in the Néouvielle Massif, near Saint-Lary-Soulan in the Pyrenees National Park and the Néouvielle National Nature Reserve.

== See also ==
- List of Pyrenean three-thousanders
