= Lac d'Aubert =

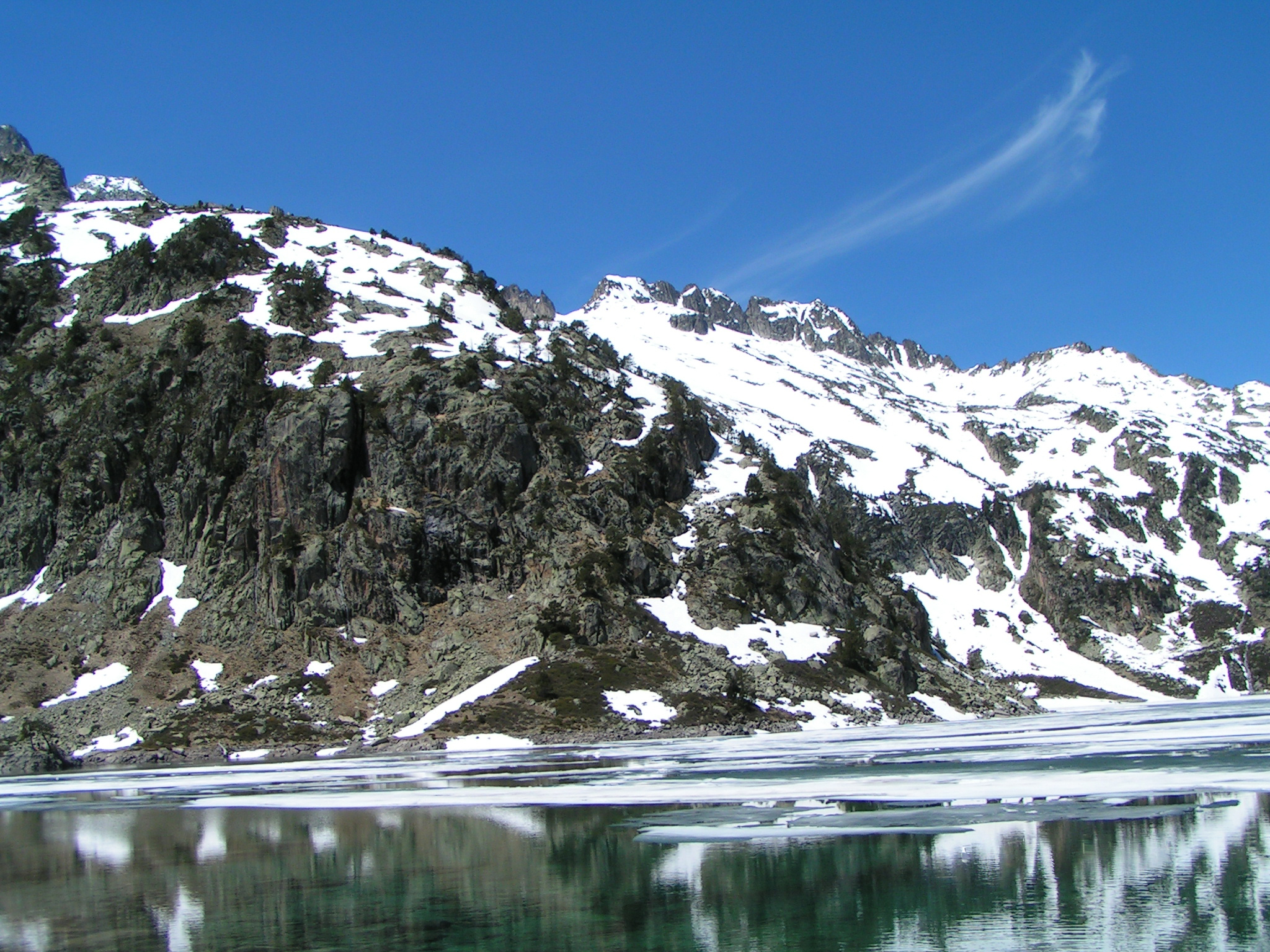

- Location within France
- Location: Hautes-Pyrénées
- Coordinates: 42°50′37″N 00°08′20″E
- Type: reservoir
- Primary outflows: Lac de Cap-de-Long and Lac d'Orédon
- Basin countries: France
- Surface area: 45 ha (110 acres)
- Max. depth: 55 m (180 ft)
- Surface elevation: 2,148 m (7,047 ft)

Lac d'Aubert is a lake in Hautes-Pyrénées, France.

== Description ==
Lac d'Aubert is a crescent-shaped natural lake fed by the glaciers of Ramougn and Chaussenque, as well as overflow from the nearby Lac d'Aumar. It is at an elevation of 2,148 m (7,047 ft) and its surface area is 45 ha (110 acres). It has a maximum depth of 55 m (180 ft). The lake can store 8,260,000 m^{3} (292,000,000 cu ft) of water behind a dam, which acts as a reservoir for the Lac de Cap-de-Long. Its outflow empties into other lakes, including Lac d'Orédon.

Its name means "green water" in the Occitan language.

== Location ==
The lake is in the Néouvielle National Nature Reserve, which is one of the oldest nature reserves in France, established in 1936. It contains around 70 lakes. It is one of a pair of lakes with Lac d'Aumar and is surrounded by the highest mountain pine forest in Europe. The walk between the dam on Lac d'Orédon and Lac d'Aubert takes 1½ hours.

== Ecology ==
During work by EDF at the dam at Lac d'Aubert in 2014, Bonnal's lizards found on the southern slope were relocated to a nearby protected area.
