= Lac d'Aumar =

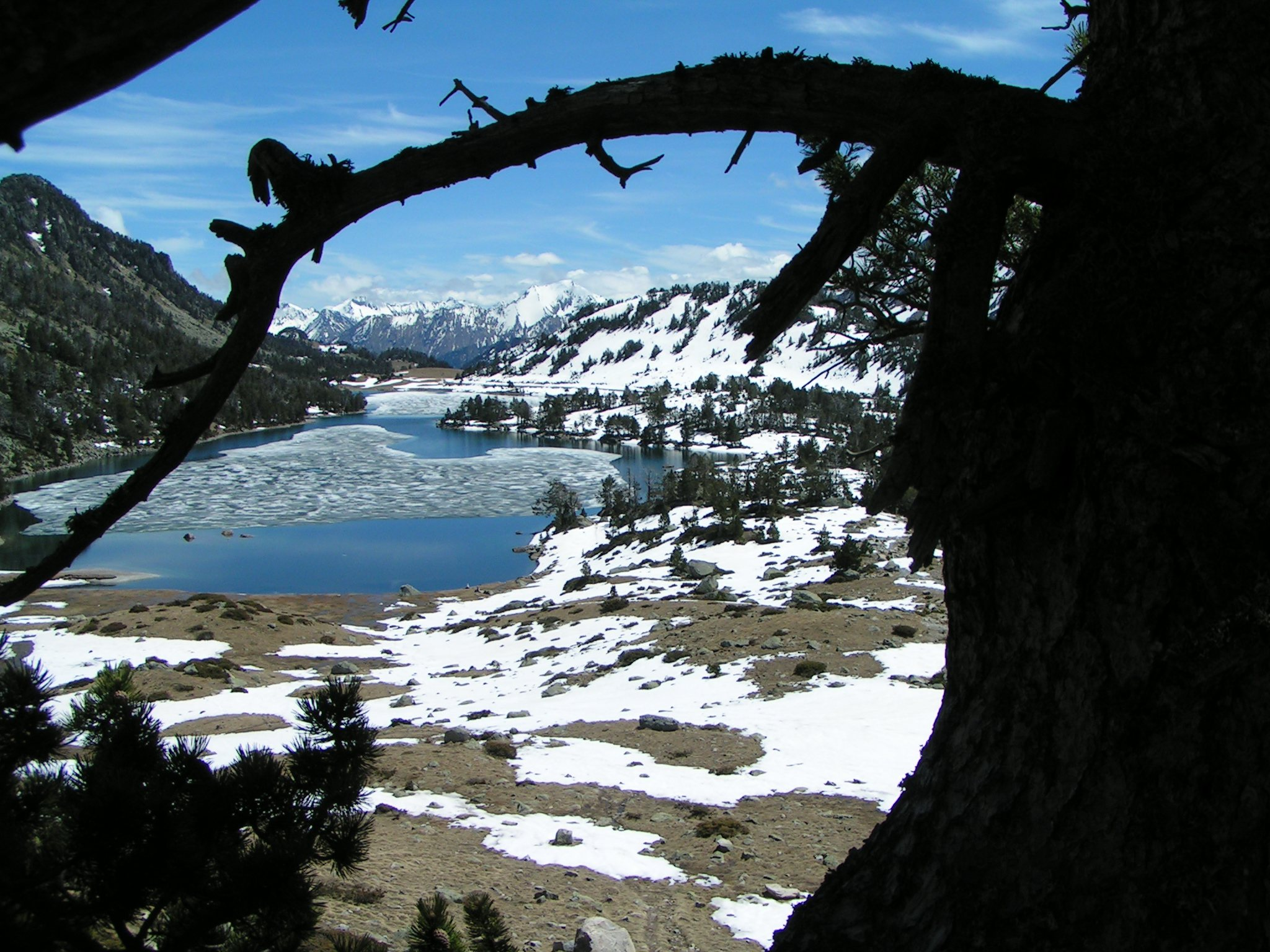

- Location within France
- Location: Hautes-Pyrénées
- Coordinates: 42°50′34″N 00°08′59″E
- Type: reservoir
- Primary outflows: Lac d'Aubert
- Basin countries: France
- Surface area: 25.8 ha (64 acres)
- Max. depth: 24 m (79 ft)
- Surface elevation: 2,192 m (7,192 ft)
- Frozen: 6 months

Lac d'Aumar is a lake in Hautes-Pyrénées, France.

== Description ==
Lac d'Aumar is a dimictic lake, formed by glacial retreat. The natural lake has been slightly modified to allow water to flow towards the nearby Lac d'Aubert and then used by Électricité de France to generate electricity. The water goes on to the Oredon dam, which supplies water to the Neste Canal. It is fed from the Madamète valley.

The lake is at an elevation of 2,192 m (7,192 ft) and its surface area is 25.80 ha (63.8 acres). It has a maximum depth of 24 m (79 ft), and it freezes for 6 months of the year. It collects water from an area of 209.80 ha (518.4 acres), with a maximum altitude of 2,663 m (8,737 ft).

Lac d'Aumar is surrounded by meadows, peat bogs, and the highest mountain pine forest in Europe.

== Location ==
The lake is in the Néouvielle National Nature Reserve, which is one of the oldest nature reserves in France, established in 1936. It contains around 70 lakes. Lac d'Aumar is in Saint-Lary-Soulan in the Hautes-Pyrénées department, extending eastward from the Pyrénées National Park.

== Hiking ==
Visitors to the lake can hike in the area, which offers views of the Néouvielle Massif and its snow-capped peaks.

The road between the Oredon Dam and Lac d'Aumar is closed to traffic from 9.30 am to 6.00 pm between June and the end of September.

Pyrénées National Park, which manages the Néouvielle National Nature Reserve, launched a restoration project to repair the paths used by hikers on trails leading to the Col d'Estoudou, as trampling and runoff had severely damaged them, causing collapse of verges, loss of trail markings, and roots of the mountain pines to be exposed. The path between Lac d'Aumar and the Col d'Estoudou, which covers 2 km (1.2 mi) of path with 60 m (200 ft) of elevation gain, was being restored in 2022.
