= Pic de Bugatet =

Mountain in France

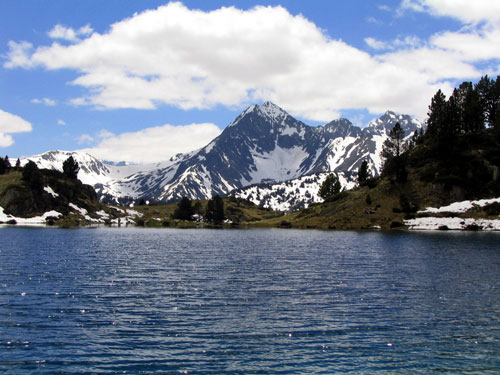
- Pic de Bugatet from the north

Highest point
- Elevation: 2,877 m (9,439 ft)
- Coordinates: 42°48′18″N 0°10′19″E

Geography
- Location within Pyrenees
- Location: Hautes-Pyrénées, France
- Parent range: Pyrenees

Pic de Bugatet (2,877 m) is a mountain in the Néouvielle Massif in the Pyrenees, lying within the Néouvielle National Nature Reserve in the commune of Saint-Lary-Soulan within the department of the Hautes-Pyrénées.
