= Estaragne =

Mountain in France

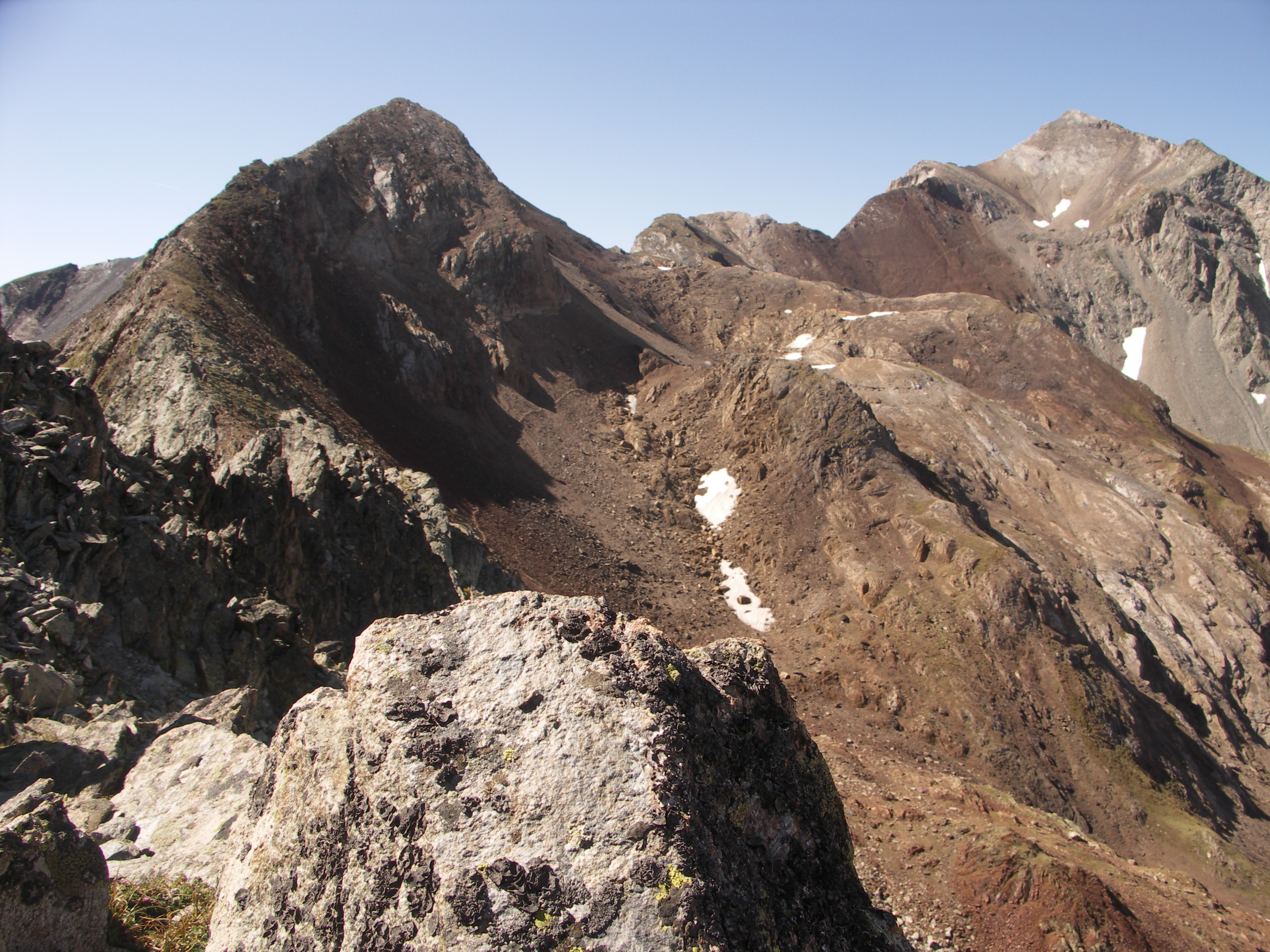

Highest point
- Elevation: 3,006 m (9,862 ft)
- Coordinates: 42°47′50″N 0°07′46″E

Geography
- Location within Pyrenees
- Location: Midi-Pyrénées, Hautes-Pyrénées, France
- Parent range: Néouvielle Massif (Pyrenees)

The Estaragne (Pic d'Estaragne) is a French Pyrenean summit, culminating at 3,006 m (9,862 ft) m.

== Topography ==
The peak is located in the Hautes-Pyrénées department, in the Néouvielle Massif, near Saint-Lary-Soulan in the Pyrénées National Park and near the Néouvielle National Nature Reserve.

== History ==
The etymology of the name "Estaragne" is unclear, although there is a small valley and stream with the same name just to the northeast of the peak.

== Ecology ==
The peak itself is bare, but the upper slopes have a sub-alpine climate. Meadows predominate with patches of trees and shrubs. Snow cover usually starts in late October and lasts until June. the most common shrubs are Rhododendron ferrugineum and Vaccinium myrtillus; and the most common grasses are Nardus stricta and Festuca eskia.

== Access ==
There are at least two relatively easy summer access routes:

- From the east, the shorter route starts by leaving the sharp turn of the D 929 at the bridge crossing over the Estaragne stream; it then ascends the small hollow and turns southwards up to the col d'Estaragne.
- From the north, starting at the Cap de Long Lake, the longer route advances up the valley of the Cap de Long creek.

== See also ==
- List of Pyrenean three-thousanders
