= Néouvielle National Nature Reserve =

Protected area in France

- IUCN category IV (habitat/species management area)
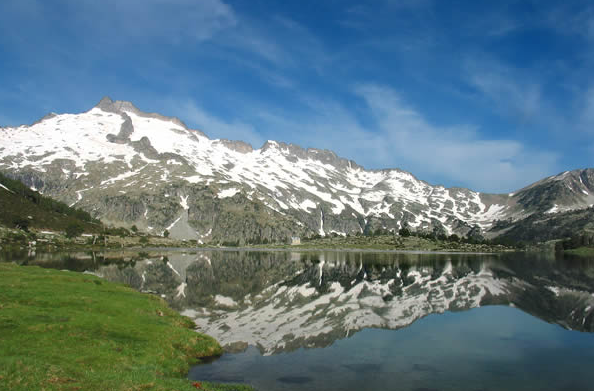
- Le Pic de Néouvielle (3 091 m) et le Lac d'Aumar
- Interactive map of Néouvielle National Nature Reserve
- Location: French Pyrénées, Hautes-Pyrénées department
- Nearest city: Saint-Lary-Soulan
- Coordinates: 42°50′35″N 0°09′35″E
- Area: 2,313 ha (5,720 acres)
- Established: May 8, 1968
- Governing body: Pyrénées National Park
- Website: Official Site

Néouvielle National Nature Reserve is a 2,313-hectare (5,720-acre) national nature reserve located in the Néouvielle Massif. It ranges from 1,800 metres (5,900 ft) to 3,091 metres (10,141 ft). With a wide array of flora and fauna, it contains about 370 animal species and 570 breeds of algae.

== Geography ==
Located in the French Pyrénées (Midi-Pyrénées region, Hautes-Pyrénées department, near Saint-Lary-Soulan and Barèges in the Néouvielle Massif), the reserve lies to the east of the Pyrenees National Park. It lies in the municipal territories of Vielle-Aure (enclave), Saint-Lary-Soulan (enclave) and Aragnouet. It is bordered to the west by the Néouvielle Massif, to the south by the Cap-de-Long and Orédon lakes, to the east by the lac de l'Oule and to the north by the col de Barèges. It includes the lakes of Aubert and Aumar. The reserve is in the lee of summits ranging from the pic de la Munia to the Arbizon massif and is generally exposed southwards, which induces a hotter and drier microclimate allowing a life limit extension.

It is mostly made up of rich pine forests and of 70 lakes and laquettes. Still today, sheep and cattle rearing continues to maintain pastures as well as the balance between lawn, heath and pinewood. Hence pastoralism, a multi-secular tradition, is a factor of ecological diversity.

== Environment ==
The forests of the Néouvielle Massif are arranged in thickets of (mountain pine), and the remaining space consists of rhododendrons and lawn. At the heart of the reserve, mountain pine reaches a European record-breaking 2,600 m (8,500 ft) high. The reserve's flora is lush, with 1,250 vascular plants, some of which also reach record-breaking heights, like the foxglove at 1,800 m (5,900 ft). The vegetation hosts a wide array of fauna with many emblematic breeds like the alpine marmot, the heather cock, the red crossbill, the golden eagle, the griffon, the egyptian vulture, le red kite, the bearded vulture as well as endemical animals: Pyrenean desman, Pyrenean brook salamander and isard.

There are many water environments, allowing a wide biological diversity with 571 breeds of algae as well as two-thirds of French sphagnums. The waters also host the common midwife toad which lives in the reserve up to 2,400 m (7,900 ft).

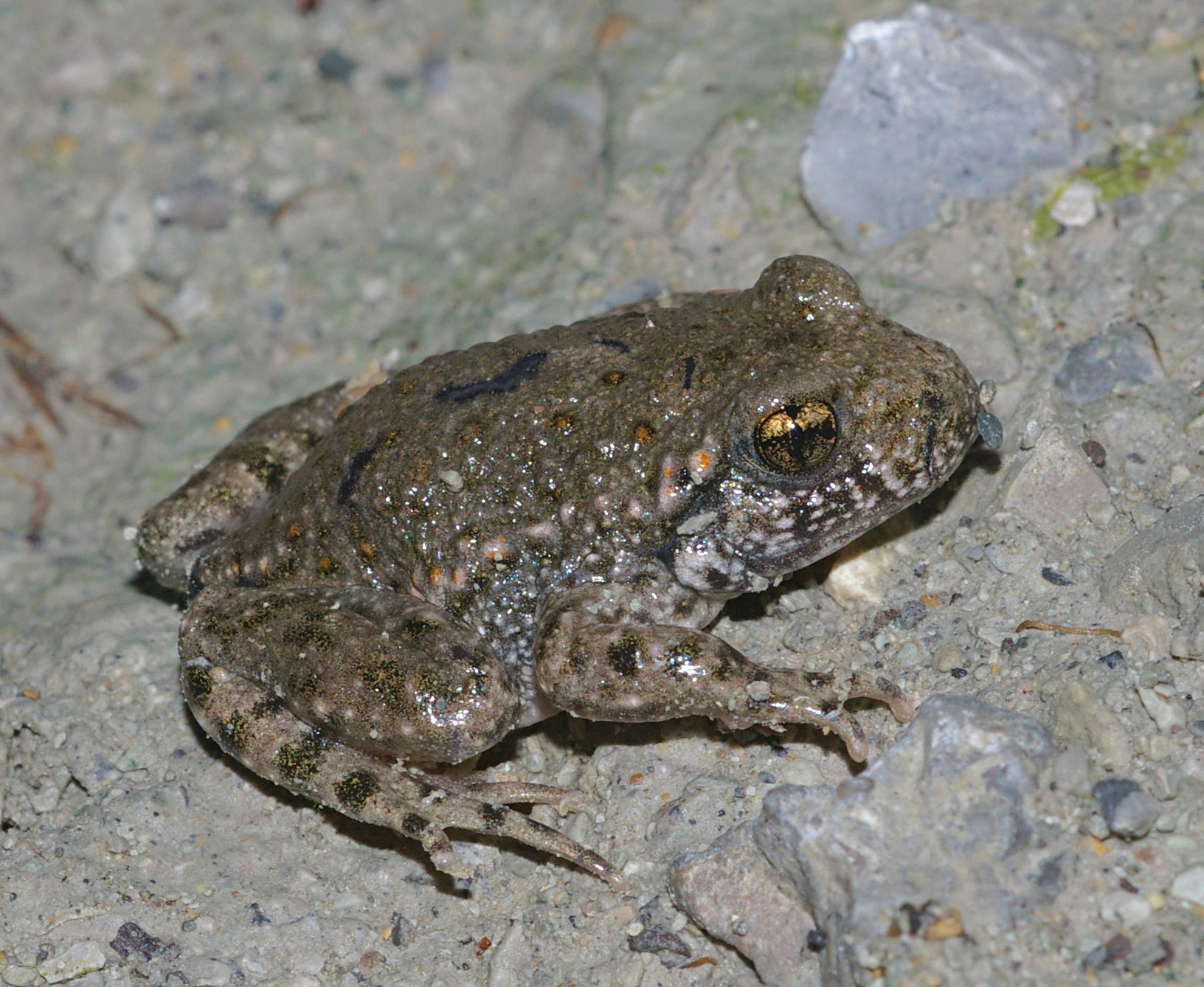
Common midwife toad

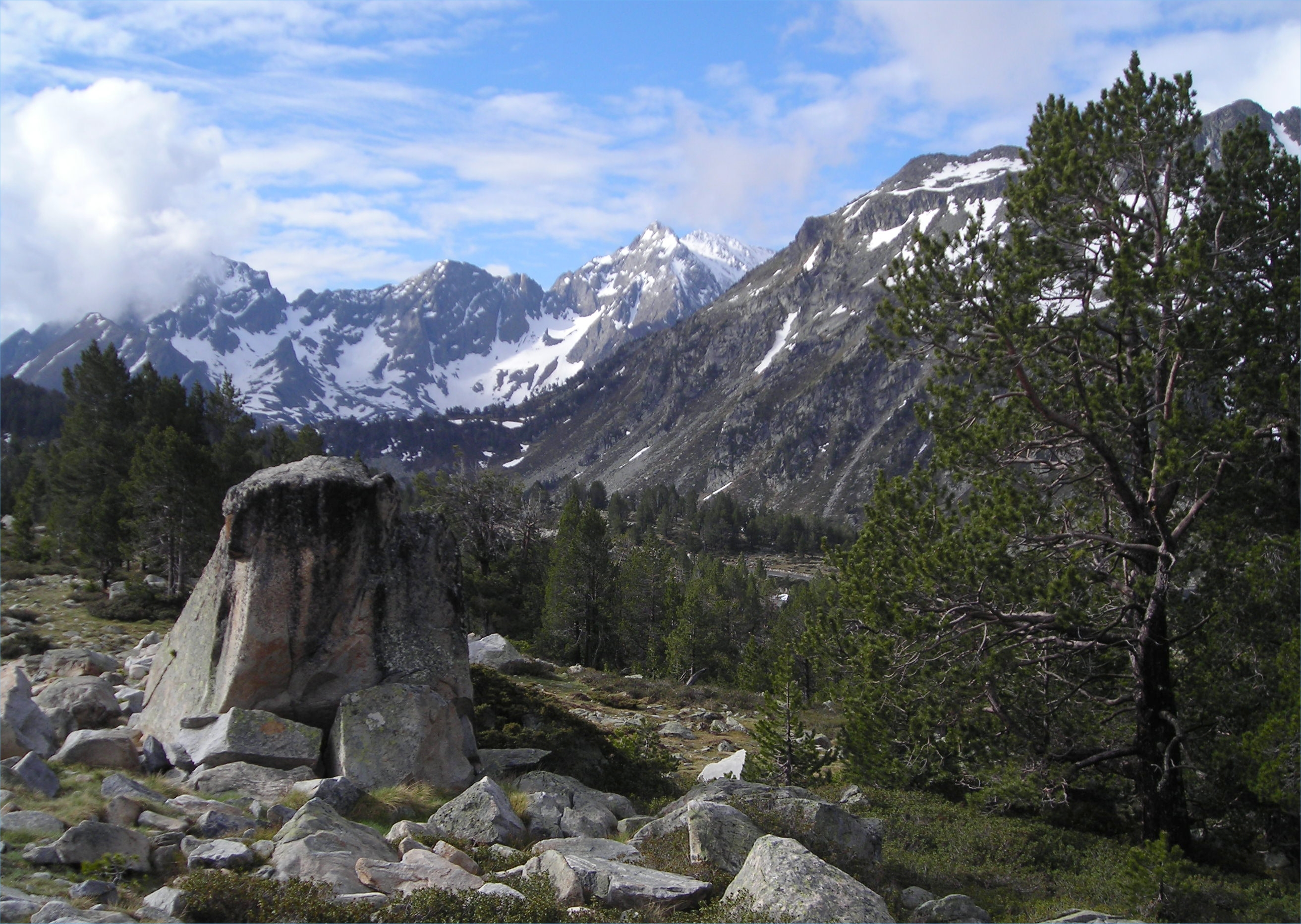
Mountain pine in the Néouvielle Massif

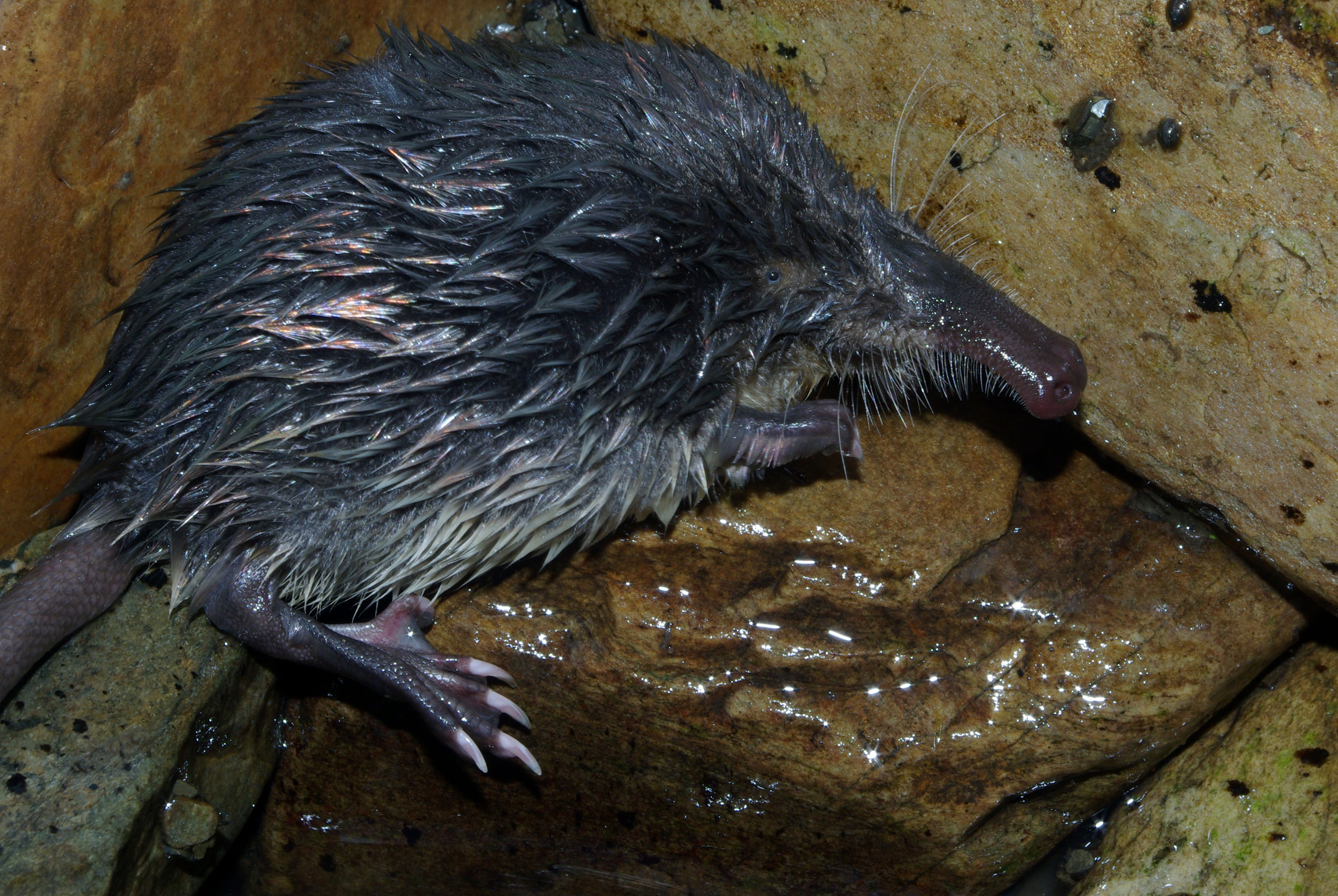
Pyrenean desman, Galemys pyrenaicus, endemic to the Pyrenees

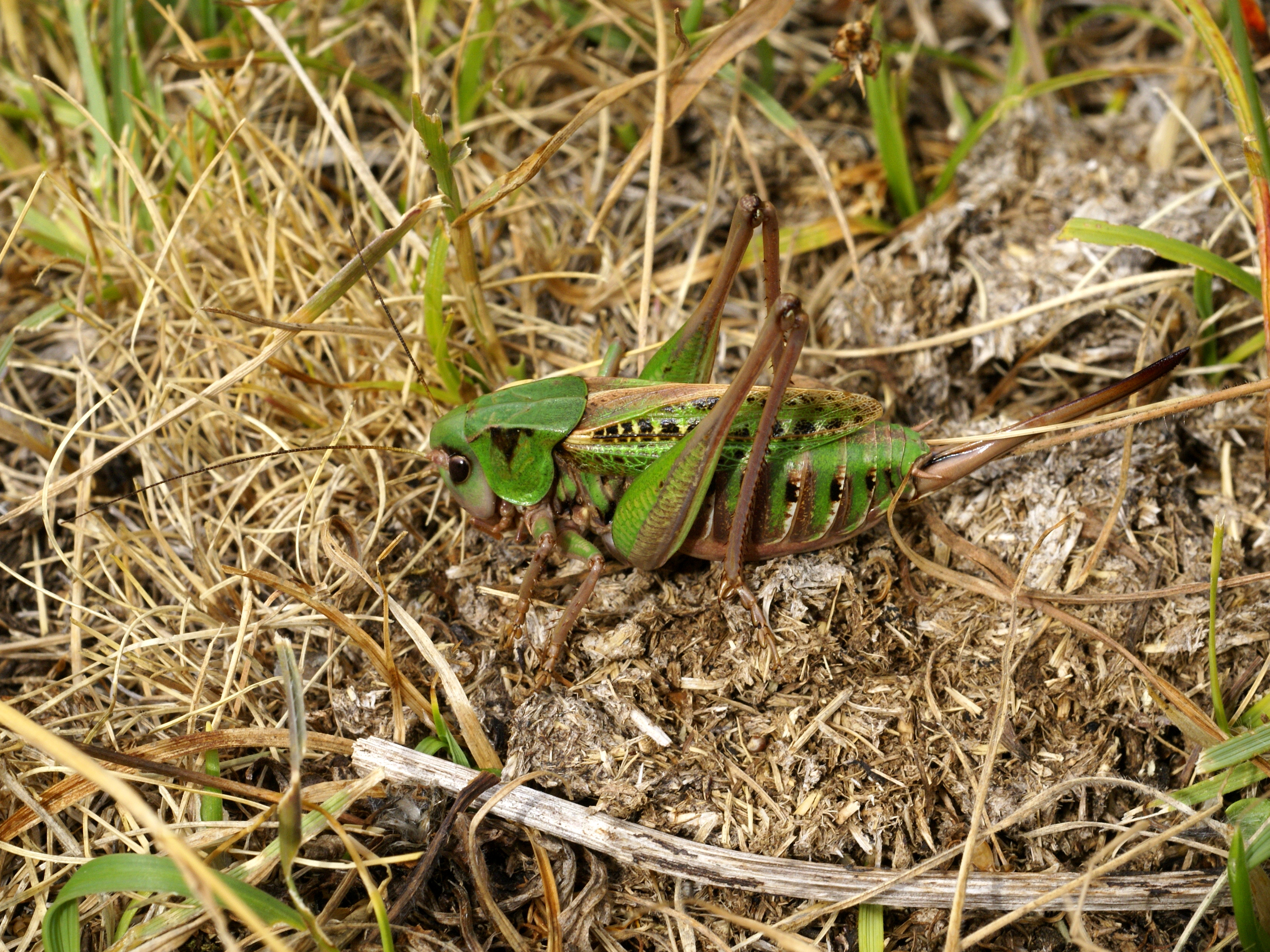
Western capercaillie,
Decticus verrucivorus

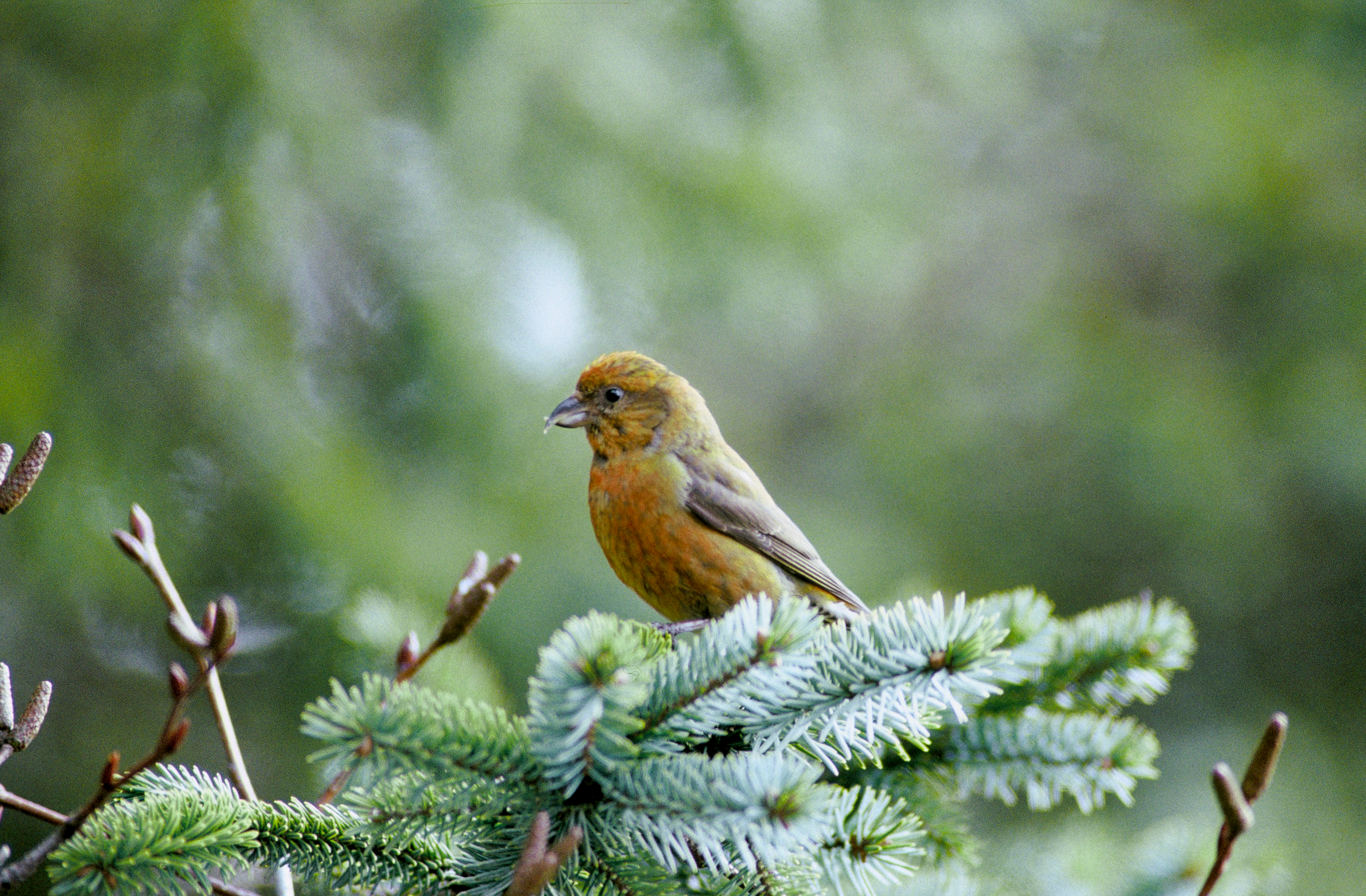
Red crossbill

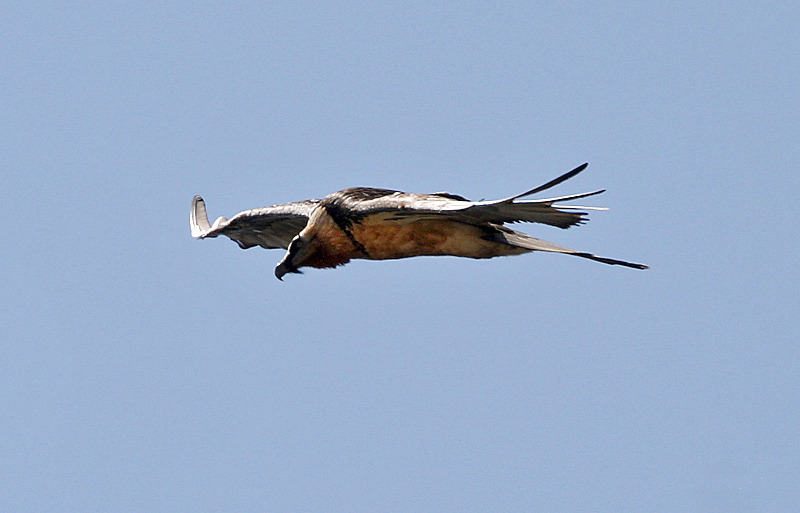
Bearded vulture,
Gypaetus barbatus

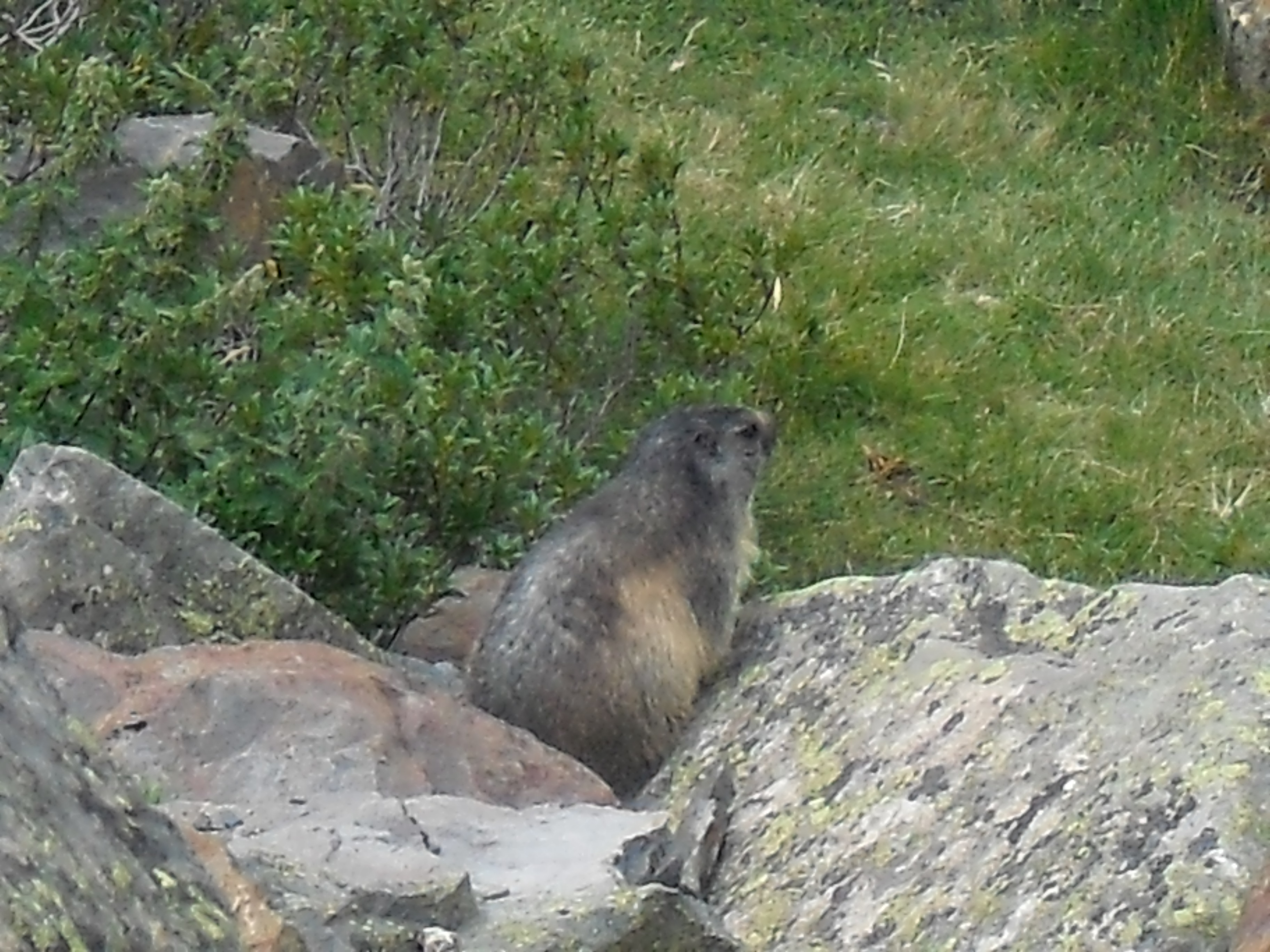
Marmot,
Marmota marmota

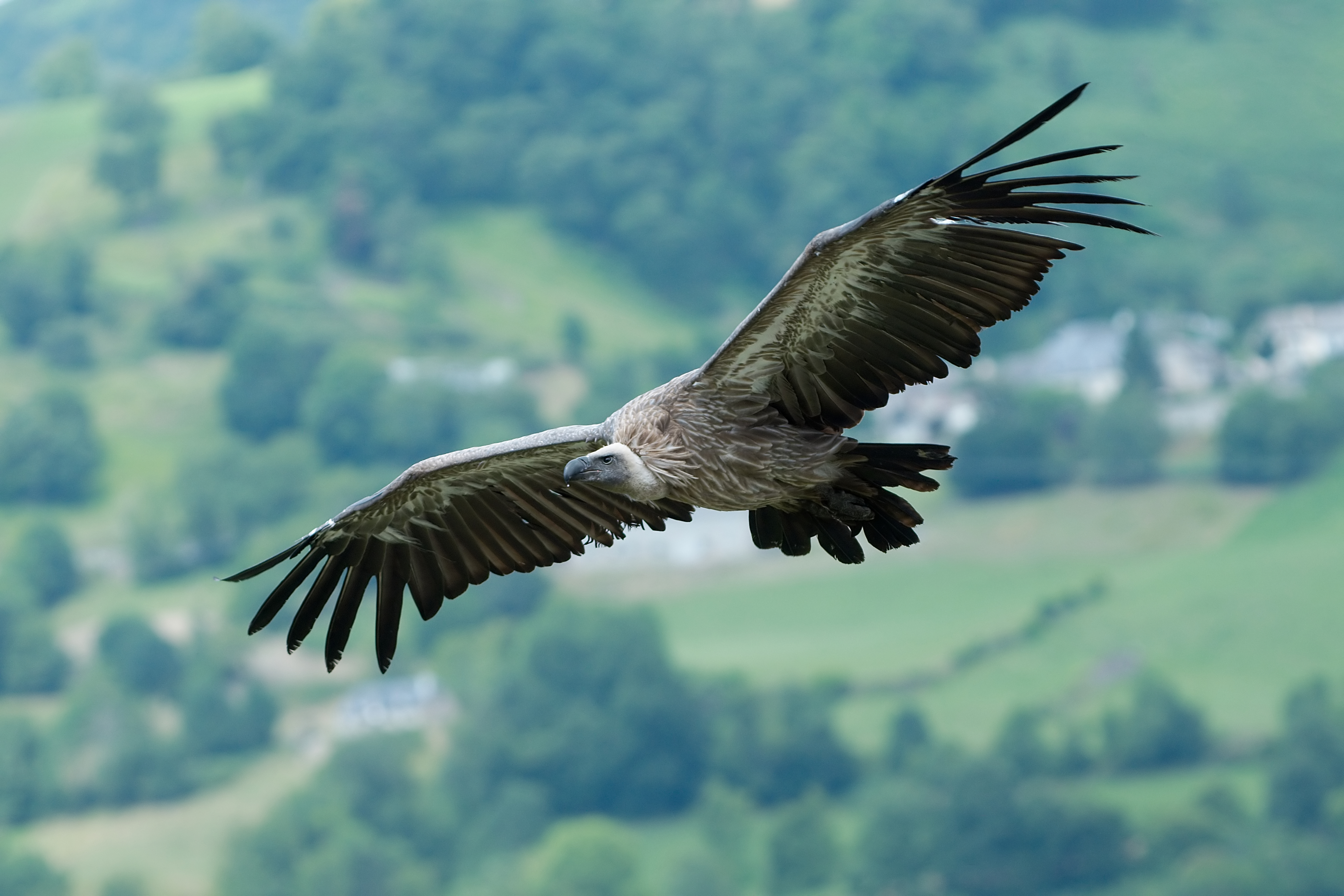
Griffon vulture

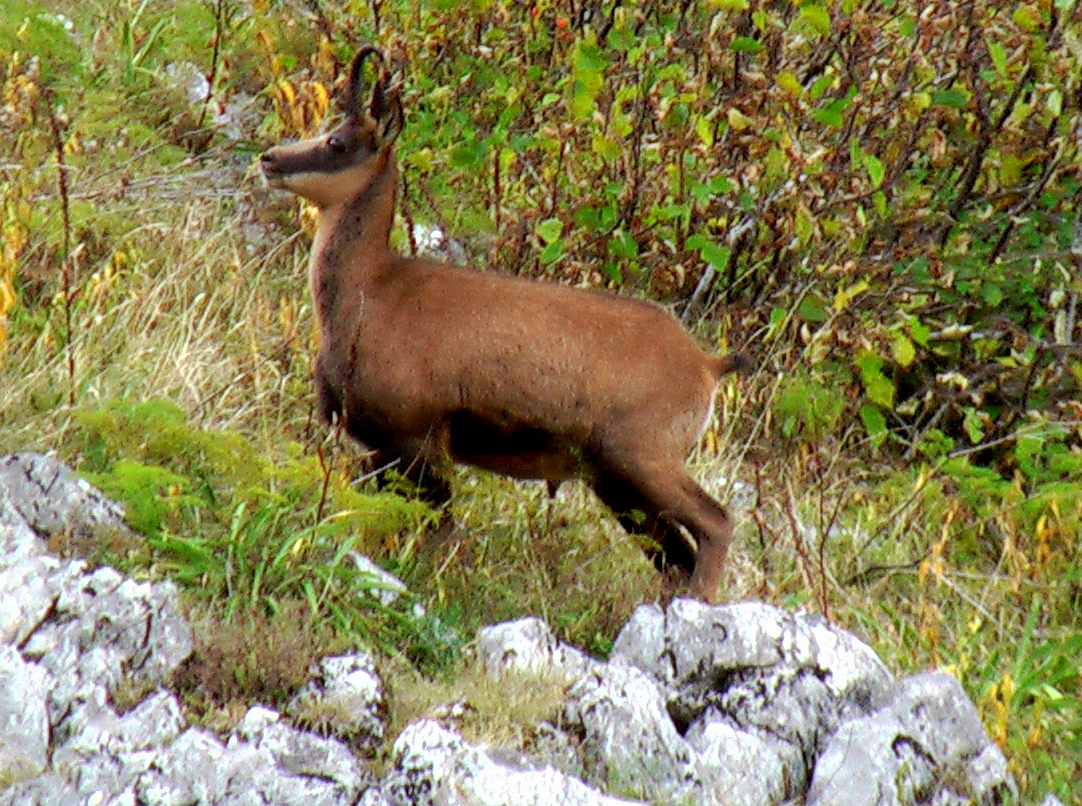
Pyrenean chamois,
Rupicapra pyrenaica

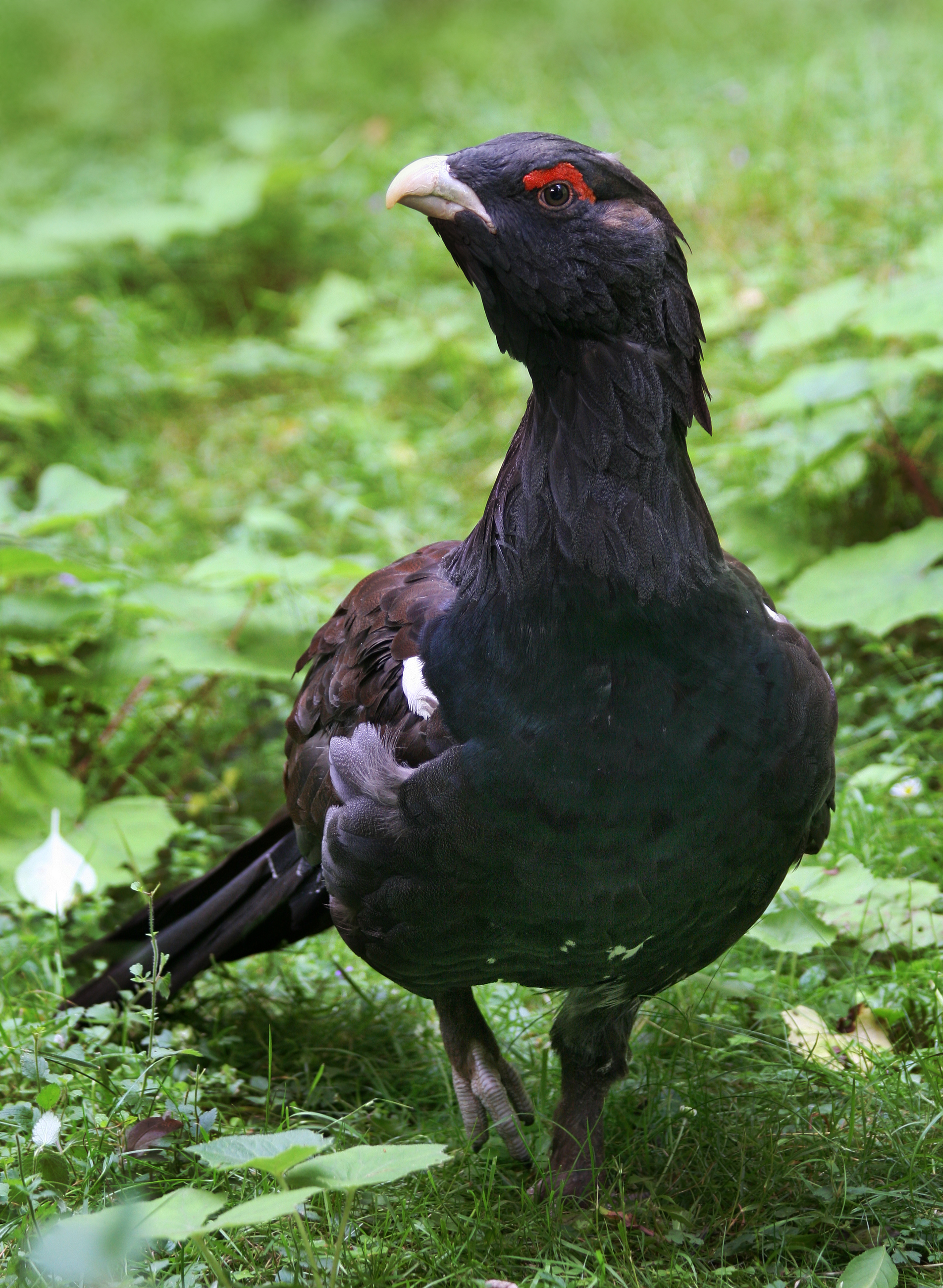
Tetrao urogallus

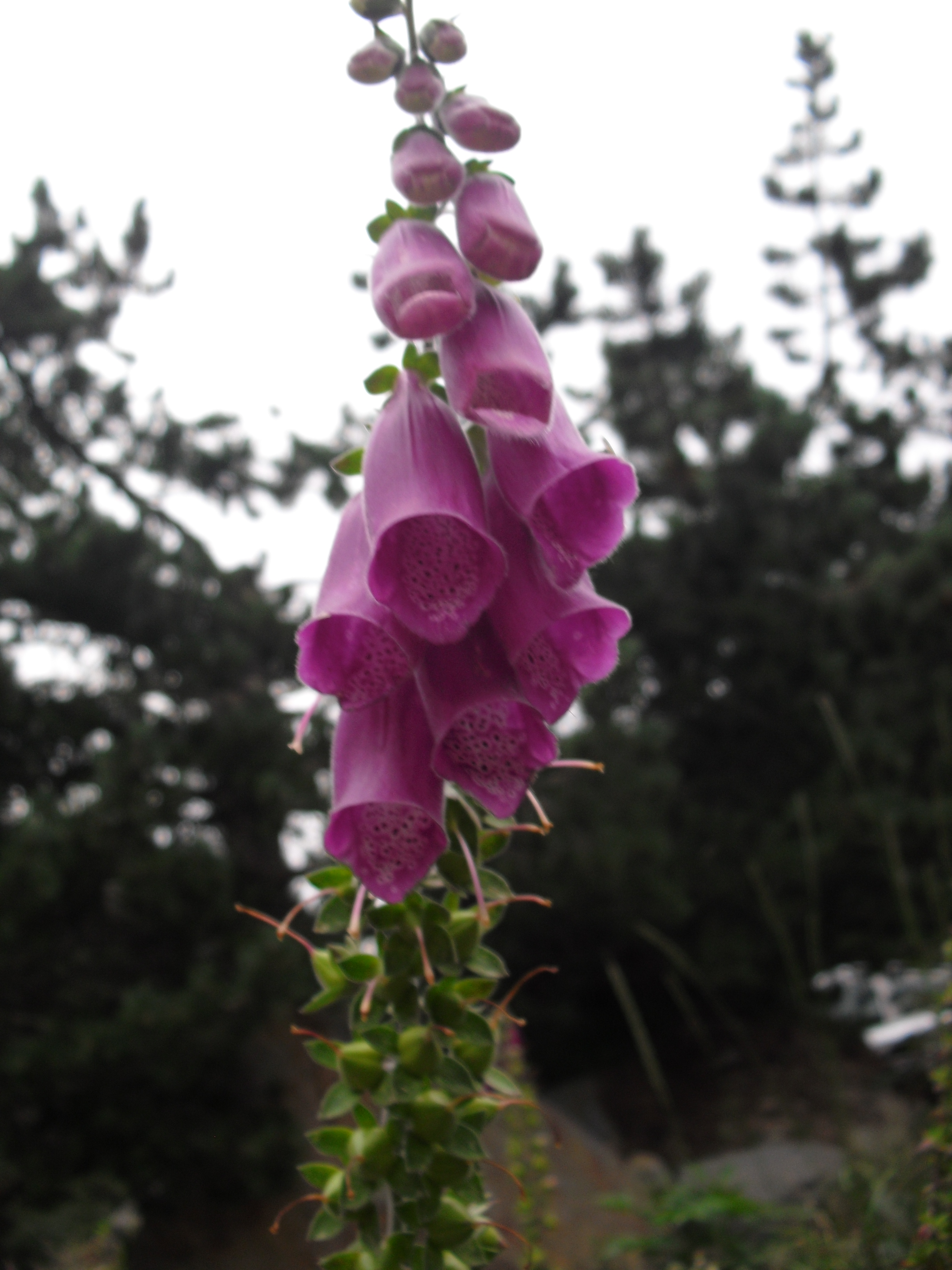
Foxglove,
Digitalis purpurea, at lac de l'Oule (1,815 m)

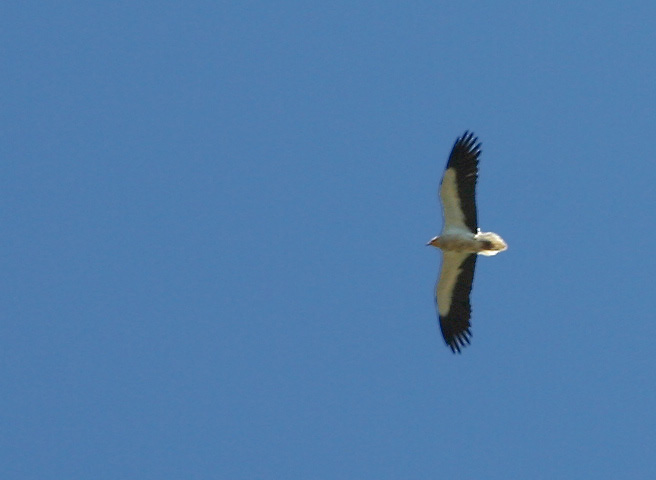
Egyptian vulture,
Neophron percnopterus

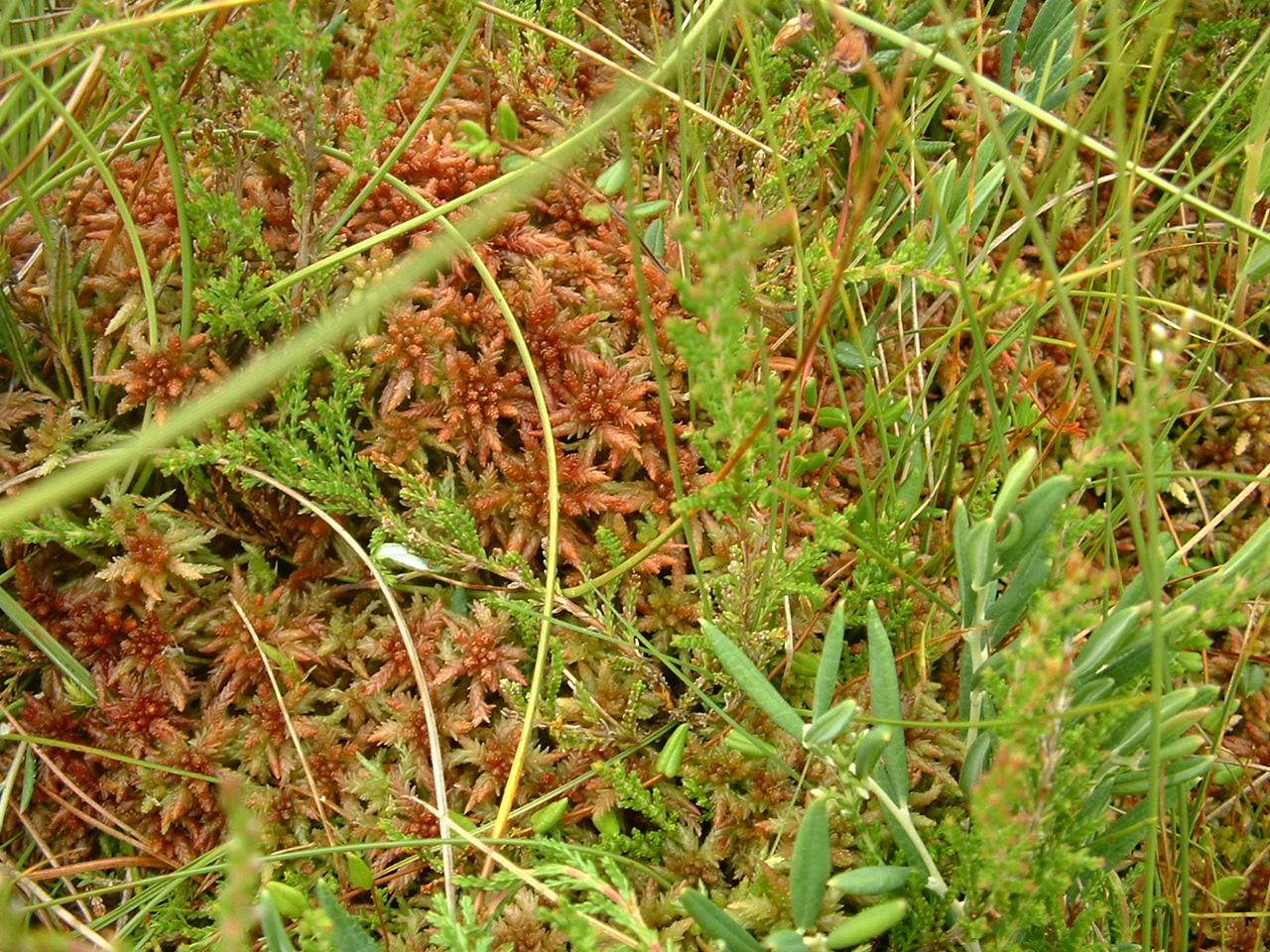
Sphagnum moss

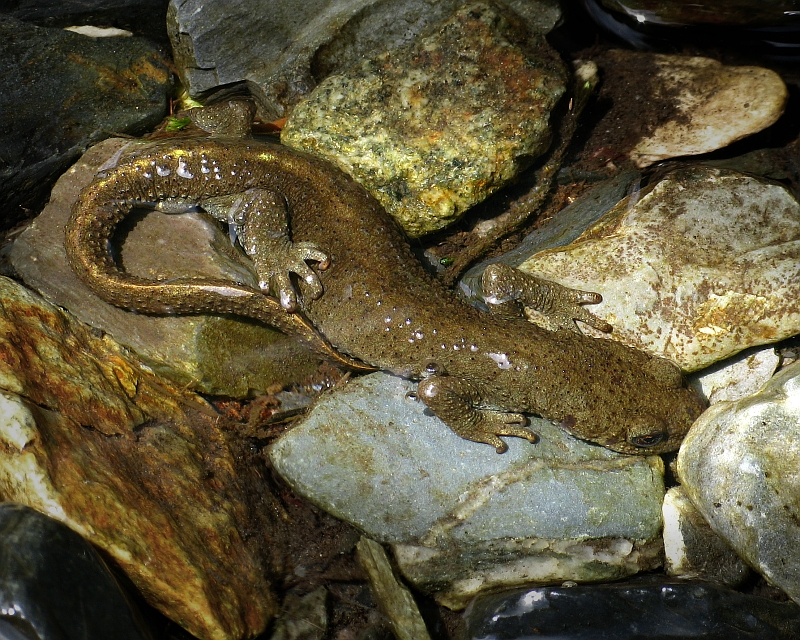
Pyrenean brook salamander,
Calotriton asper, endemic to the Pyrenees

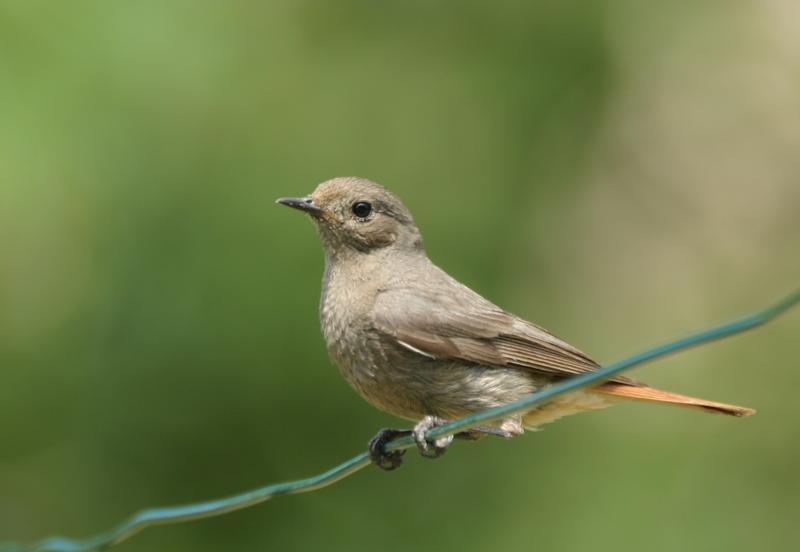
Black redstart,
Phoenicurus ochruros
