= Lac de l'Oule =

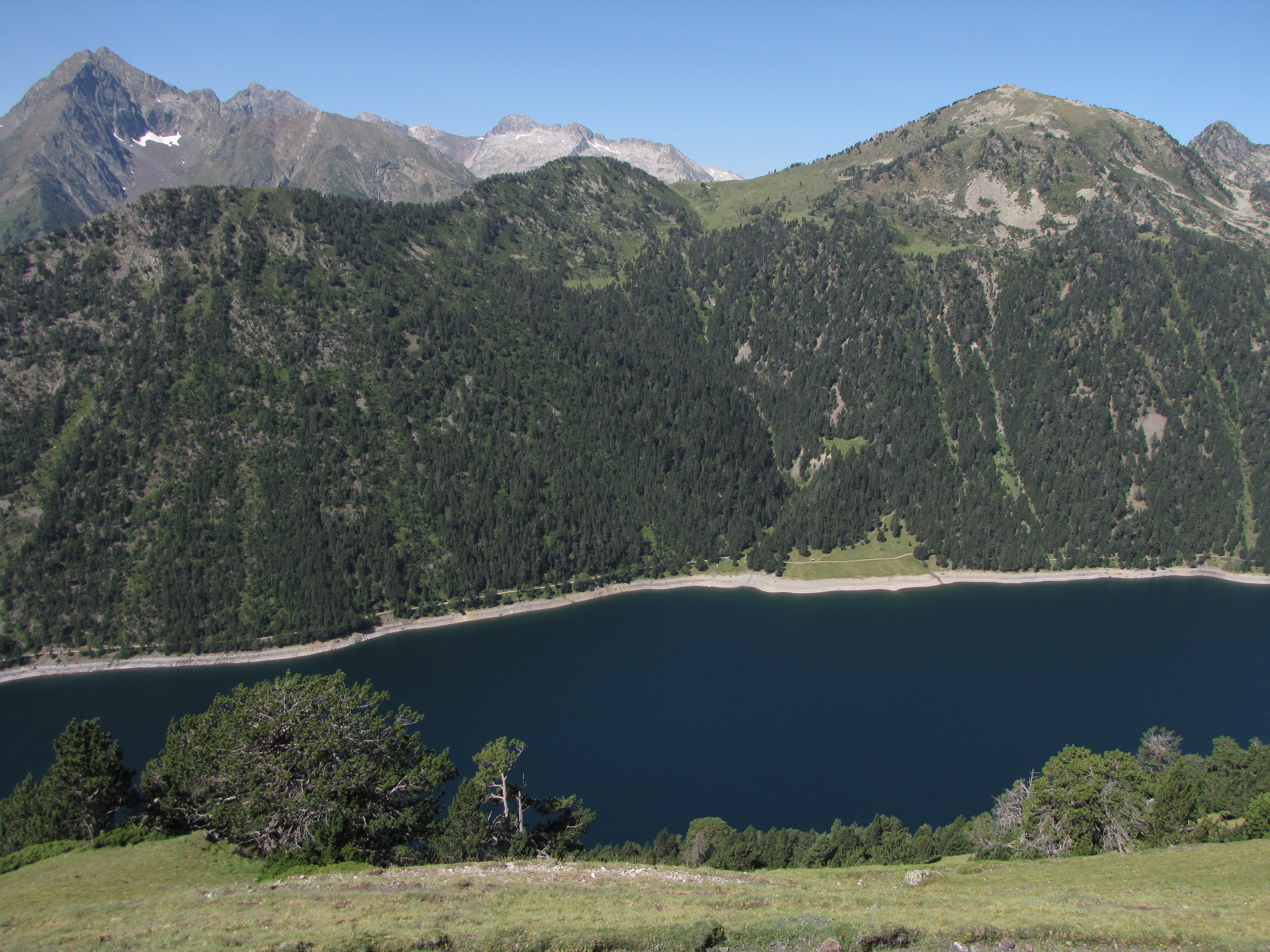

- Location within Pyrenees
- Location: Hautes-Pyrénées
- Coordinates: 42°49′52″N 00°12′08″E
- Type: reservoir
- Primary inflows: lac d'Oredon
- Basin countries: France
- Surface area: 58 ha (140 acres)
- Max. depth: 28 m (92 ft)
- Surface elevation: 1,819 m (5,968 ft)

Lac de l'Oule is a lake in Hautes-Pyrénées, France. At an elevation of 1819 m, its surface area is 58 ha.
