= Lac de Madamète =

Lake in Hautes-Pyrénées, France

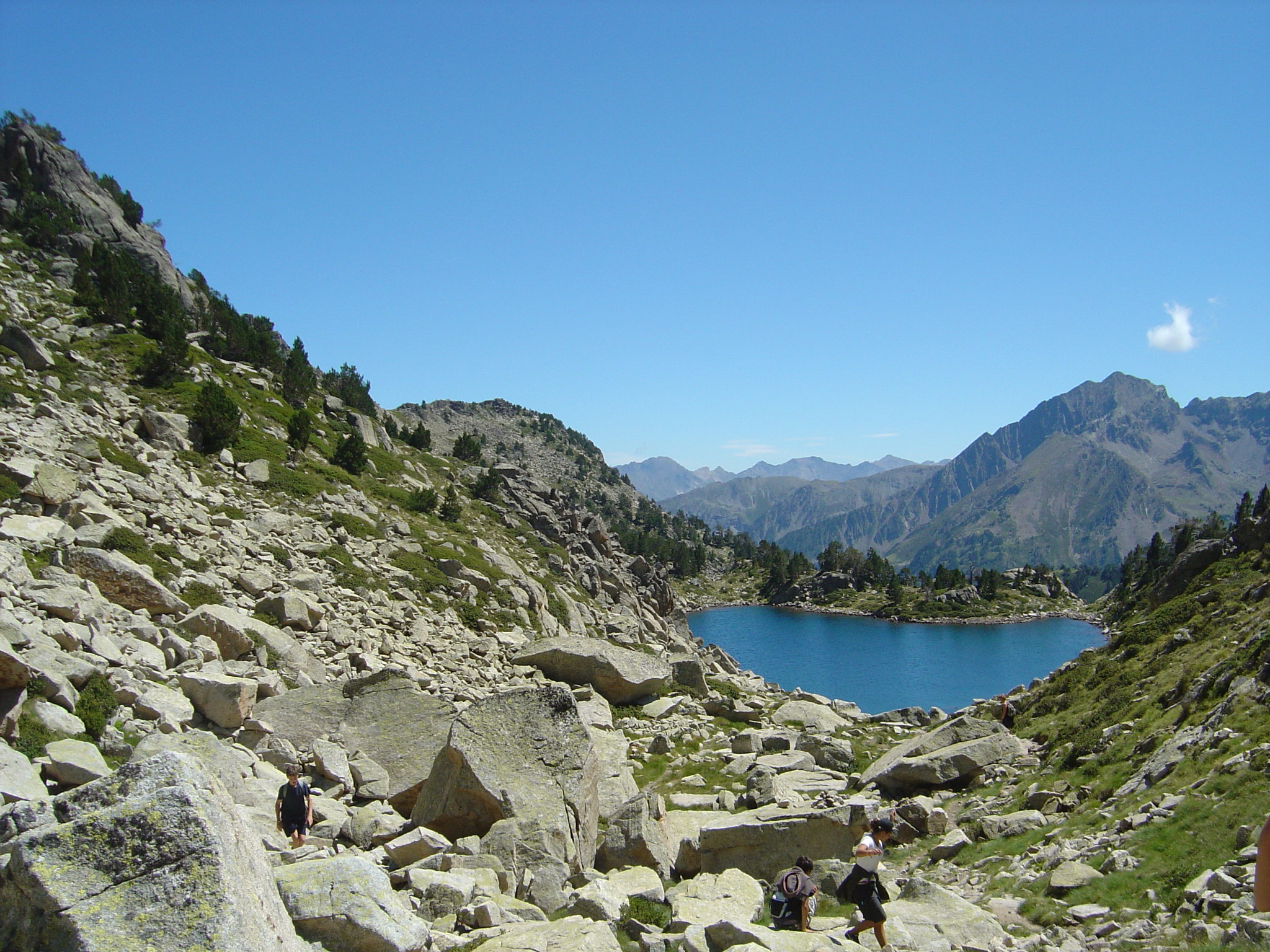

- Location within Pyrenees
- Location: Hautes-Pyrénées
- Coordinates: 42°52′02″N 0°08′42″E
- Basin countries: France
- Surface area: 0.026 km^{2} (0.010 sq mi)
- Surface elevation: 2,299 m (7,543 ft)

Lac de Madamète is a lake in Hautes-Pyrénées, France. At an elevation of 2299 m, its surface area is 0.026 km^{2}.
