= Pic Long =

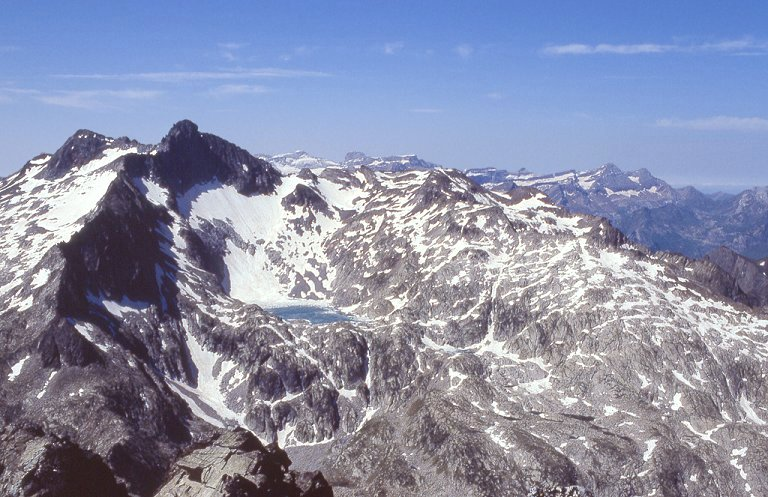
- Pic Long's North face overlooks Tourrat Lake (view from Turon de Néouvielle)

Highest point
- Elevation: 3,192 m (10,472 ft)
- Coordinates: 42°48′04″N 0°06′01″E

Geography
- Location within Pyrenees
- Location: Hautes-Pyrénées, France
- Parent range: Pyrenees

Climbing
- First ascent: 13 August 1890 by Henri Brulle, Célestin Passet and François Brenat-Salles

Pic Long (3,192 m) is the highest mountain in the Néouvielle Massif in the Pyrenees.

It is located in the commune of Saint-Lary-Soulan within the department of the Hautes-Pyrénées.
