= Pic Ramougn =

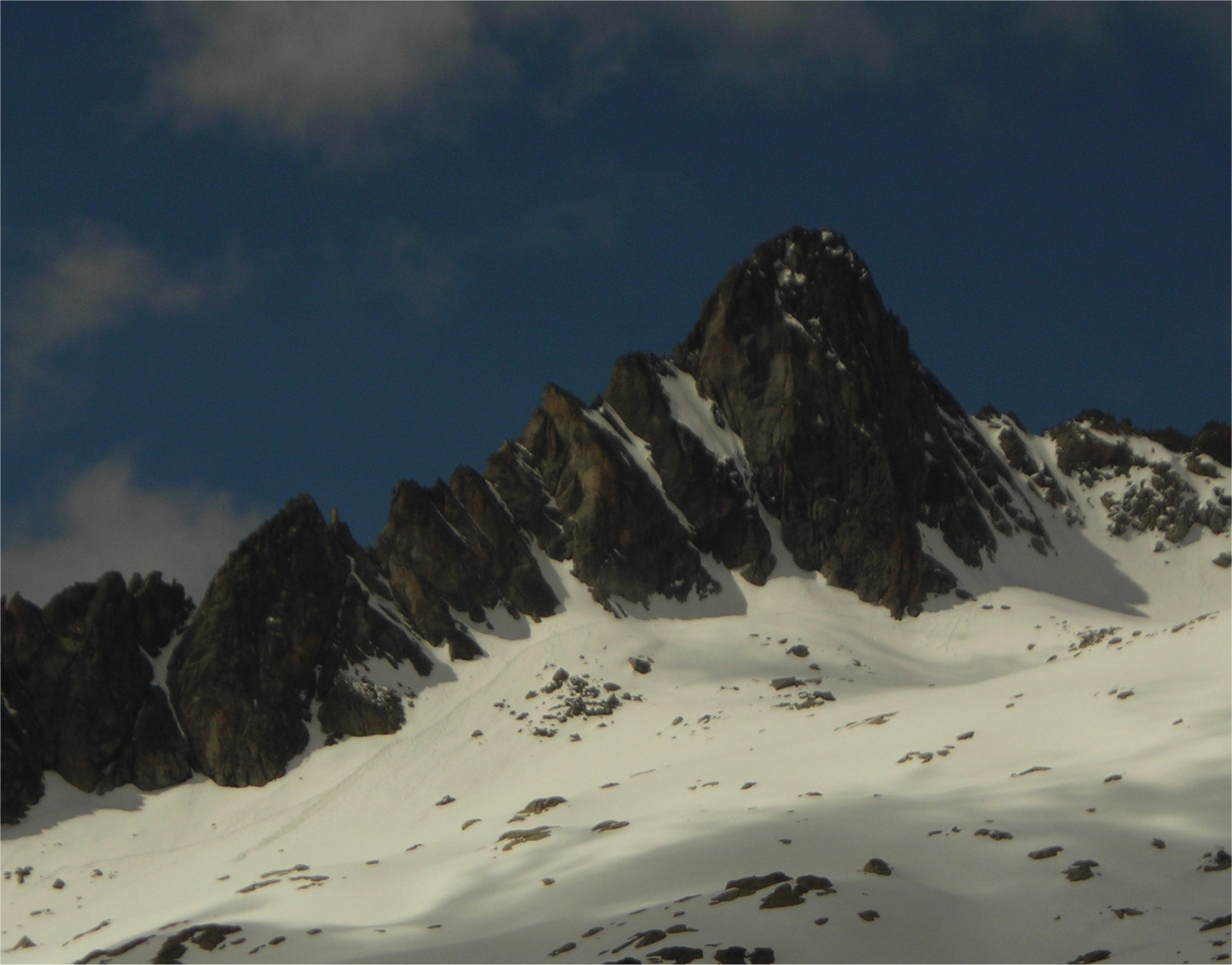
- North side of Pic Ramougn from Hourquette d'Aubert

Highest point
- Elevation: 3,011 m (9,879 ft)
- Coordinates: 42°50′06″N 00°07′12″E

Geography
- Location within Pyrenees
- Location: Hautes-Pyrénées, France
- Parent range: Pyrenees

Geology
- Mountain type: Granite

Pic Ramougn (3,011 m) is a steep, rocky mountain in the Néouvielle Massif in the Pyrenees.

It is located in the commune of Saint-Lary-Soulan within the department of the Hautes-Pyrénées, and is named after the French politician, geologist and botanist Louis Ramond de Carbonnières. Ramougn is the pronunciation of Ramond in the Gascon language.
