= Lac d'Orédon =

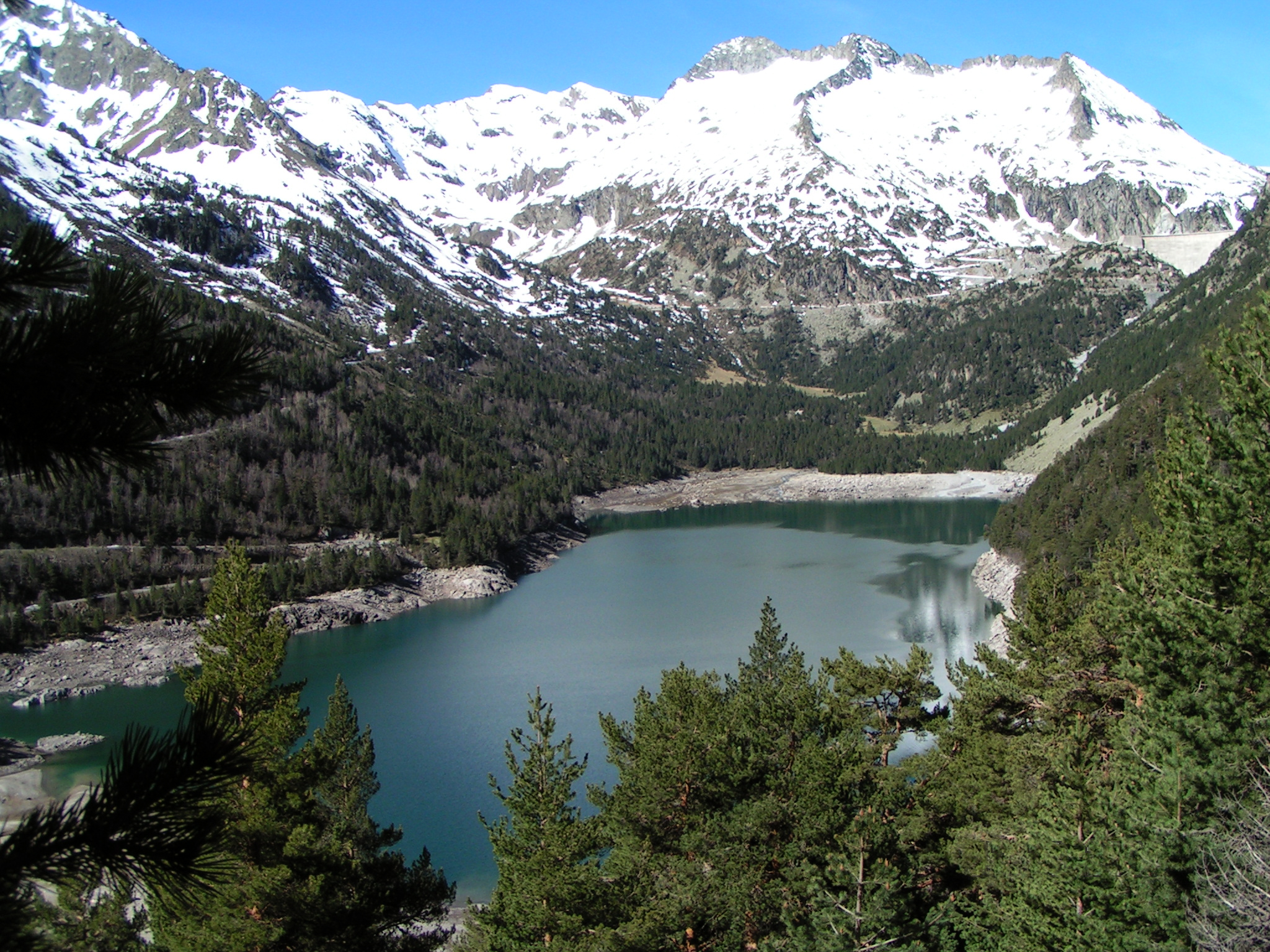

- Location within Pyrenees
- Location: Hautes-Pyrénées
- Coordinates: 42°49′32″N 00°09′43″E
- Type: reservoir
- Primary inflows: Lac de Cap-de-Long
- Primary outflows: Neste
- Basin countries: France
- Surface area: 0.46 km^{2} (0.18 sq mi)
- Surface elevation: 1,849 m (6,066 ft)

Lac d'Orédon is a lake raised by a dam in Hautes-Pyrénées, France. At an elevation of 1849m, its surface area is 0.46 km². It was one of the first lakes of the Pyrenees to have been built in the 17th century.

== Public Use ==
In 1864, the Ministry of Agriculture decided to increase and regulate the flow of the Neste canal (feeding Gers rivers) using the lakes of the upper valley of Aure (Aubert, Aumar, Cap-de -Long, Lac d'Orédon). The lake was expropriated for public utility in June 1869. Construction of the dam and reservoir was completed in 1884.
