= Lac de Cap-de-Long =

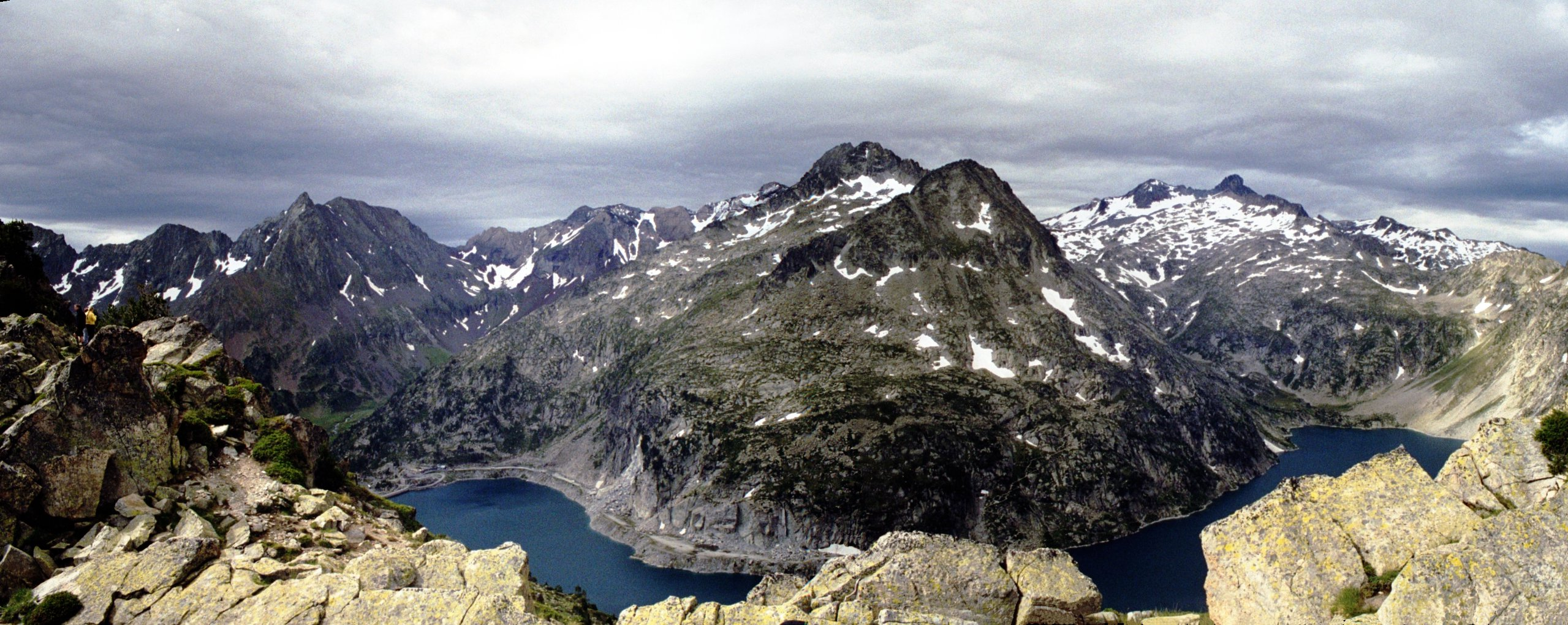

- Location within Pyrenees
- Location: Hautes-Pyrénées
- Coordinates: 42°49′30″N 00°07′47″E
- Type: reservoir
- Primary outflows: Neste de Couplan
- Basin countries: France
- Surface area: 1.1 km^{2} (0.42 sq mi)
- Max. depth: 130 m (430 ft)
- Surface elevation: 2,161 m (7,090 ft)

Lac de Cap-de-Long is a lake in Hautes-Pyrénées, France. At an elevation of 2161 m, its surface area is 1.1 km².
