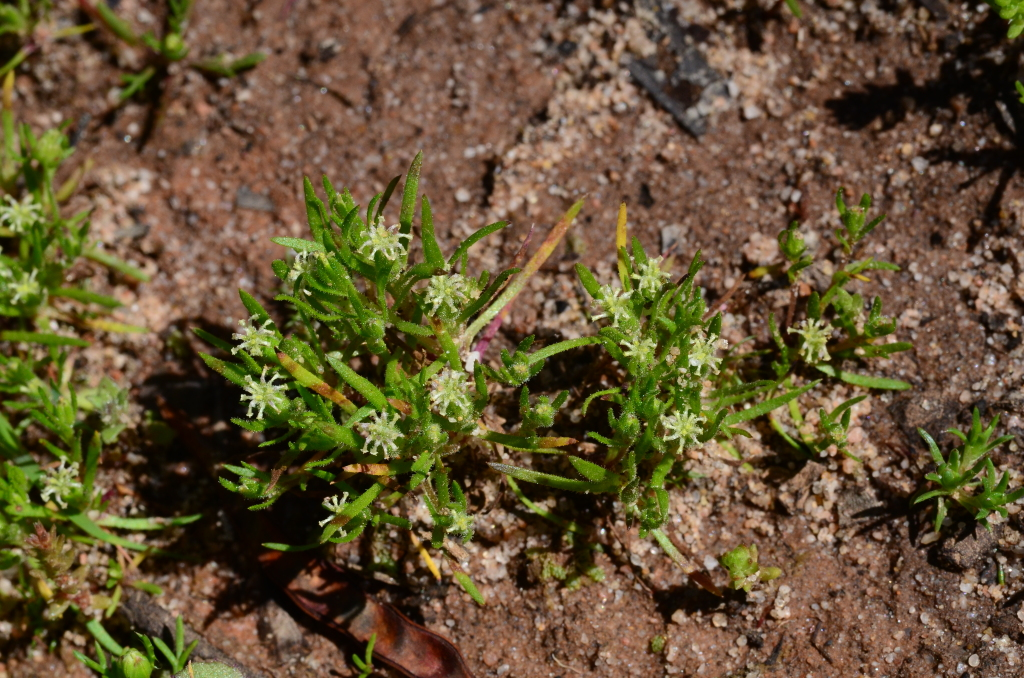

Scientific classification
- Kingdom: Plantae
- Clade: Embryophytes
- Clade: Tracheophytes
- Clade: Spermatophytes
- Clade: Angiosperms
- Clade: Eudicots
- Clade: Asterids
- Order: Asterales
- Family: Asteraceae
- Genus: Millotia
- Species: M. muelleri

Binomial name
- Millotia muelleri (Sond.) P.S.Short
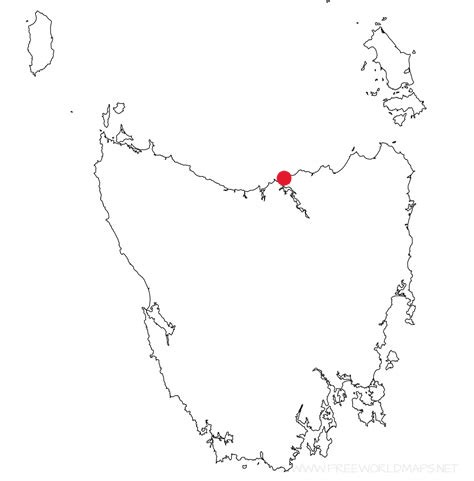
- Distribution of M. muelleri in Tasmania

Synonyms
- Anthocerastes muelleri Sond.; Toxanthes muelleri (Sond.) Benth

= Millotia muelleri =

Species of plant

Millotia muelleri, commonly known as the common bow-flower, is an annual herb endemic to Australia. It is widespread throughout Victoria and in a single location on the north coast of Tasmania.

== Description ==
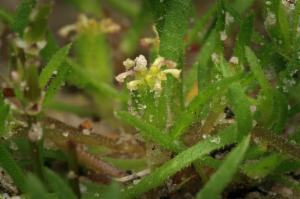
Glandular stems and curved tube corollas

Millotia muelleri is an annual forb; a low-growing herbaceous plant (non-woody stem) that grows, seeds, flowers and dies within a year. Branches are erect and 1–9 cm long, with stems often sprawling and covered in stalked glandular hairs – sometimes also white cottony hairs. The Tasmanian collection is documented at the smaller end of the height range. Leaves at the bottom of the stems are opposite, and upper leaves are alternate. All leaves are linear, 5 – 18 mm long, and also covered with glandular hairs.

Flowers form at the end of branches in compound heads surrounded by a single row of 4 to 5 bracts. The bracts are about 3 mm long and often have purplish clear margins. The flower compounds consist of 3 to 15 bisexual florets, with corollas occurring in colours cream or purplish. Corollas occur in curved tubes of 3 to 4 lobes. They have an achene fruit from 4 to 6 mm long and have a papillated surface, lacking scales, hairs or bristles for dispersal.

M. muelleri germinates from soil-stored seeds, with germination period still unknown. The flowering season is reliant on the timing and intensity of rains in autumn and winter, with a low likelihood of emergence after severe drought. In Tasmania, the bow-flower is known to flower in mid-to-late–October, with a broader range of August to November on the mainland. The germination, growth and flowering of the clustered bow-flower is likely dependent on resource availabilities such as water and bare ground.

There are only two species in the Millotia family in Tasmania (muelleri and tenuifolia), so M. muelleri has high phylogenetic distinctiveness. The curved corollas make create a morphological distinction, and M. muelleri is unlikely to be confused with other species in Tasmania. The other species in the genus is Millotia tenuifolia which has its own distinct, white cottony leaves and flower.

== Distribution and Ecology ==
Millotia muelleri is found in woodland areas in Victoria, New South Wales and South Australia, typically occupying shrublands with sandy soils and rock exposures. In Tasmania, M. muelleri is found in a single location at West Head in the state’s north. This site consists of thin, sandy soil on top of rock plates at the top of a dolerite cliff. Vegetation nearby includes Allocasuarina verticillata (dropping sheoak) and shrubs such as Calytrix tetragona (common fringe myrtle).

It is unlikely to see more than 60 plants in a site of 10 m^{2}, accounting for fluctuation in emergence. There are many adversities that challenge the clustered bow-flower, given the population is small in numbers and extent.

Disturbance: the thin layer of sandy soil and moss that typically homes the M. muelleri is highly vulnerable to physical disturbances such as trampling. M. muelleri has soil stored seeds, and so disturbances to the soil could directly impact germination.

Climate change: due to the species restricting emergence to favourable years of rainfall, the threat of climate change is intense on the species. Small shifts in climate, such as changes in rainfall pattern or intensity, and overall temperatures, can have adverse impacts on M. muelleri, likely restricting emergence and the quality of soil seed storage.

Despite its small population, the clustered bow-flower has some ecological significance in how it provides diversity as a native Australian forb. The species could also be considered as a botanic indicator, with its presence indicating certain soil types and climactic conditions, especially when the plant emerges (rainfall, sandy soil). Although there is still research to be done about pollination and seed dispersal, M. muelleri likely provides nectar and pollen for small native insects, contributing to local food webs.

== Taxonomy ==
Formerly known as Toxanthes muelleri, the Millotia genus is named to honour Claude Millot, a French scientist and historian. The species muelleri was named to honour Ferdinand von Mueller, a German-born Australian botanist who named over 2000 new species.
