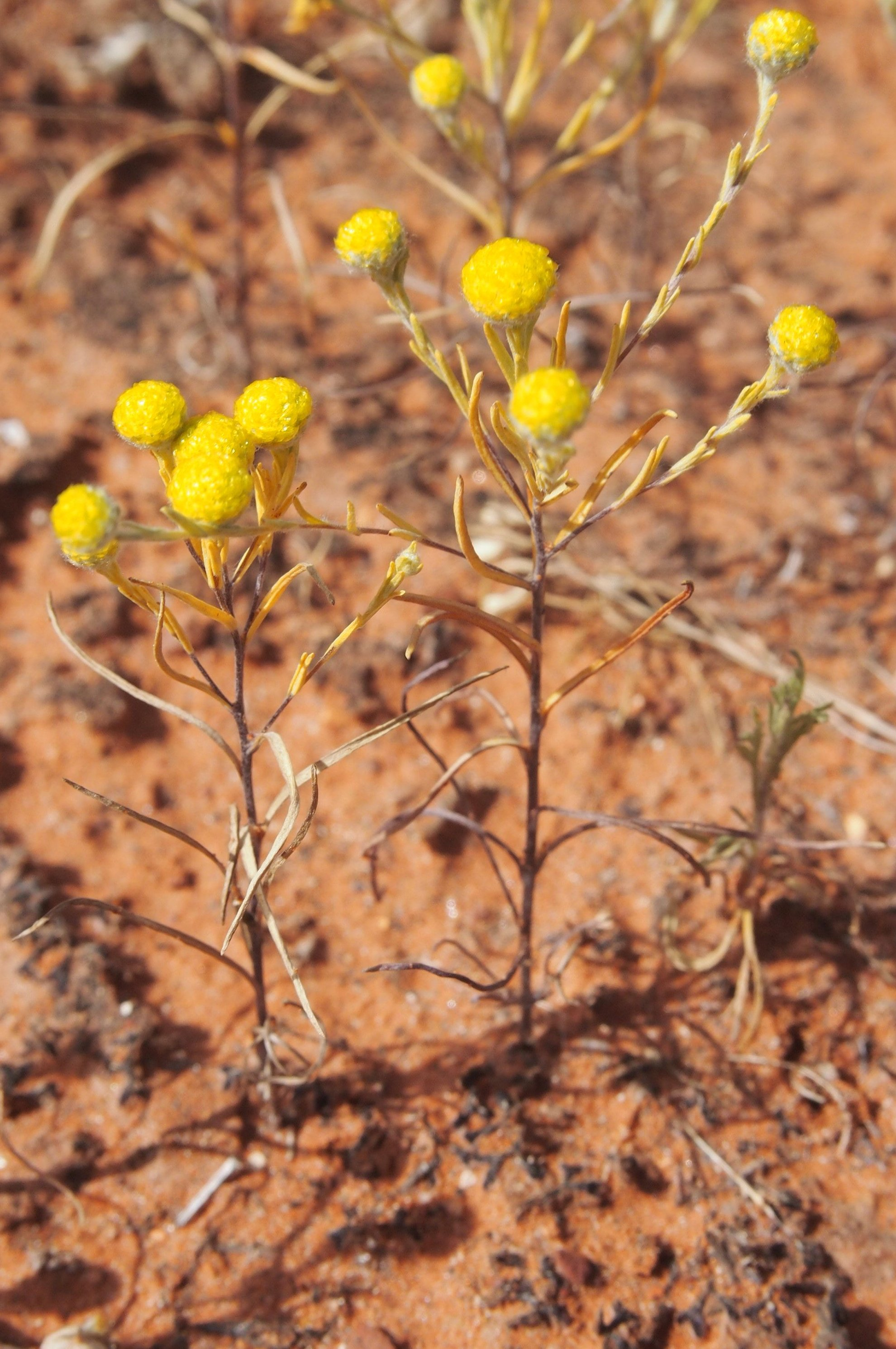
- Gnephosis arachnoidea

Scientific classification
- Kingdom: Plantae
- Clade: Tracheophytes
- Clade: Angiosperms
- Clade: Eudicots
- Clade: Asterids
- Order: Asterales
- Family: Asteraceae
- Subfamily: Asteroideae
- Tribe: Gnaphalieae
- Genus: Gnephosis; Cass.

Type species
- Gnephosis tenuissima Cass.

Synonyms
- Chrysocoryne Endl.; Craspedia sect. Gnephosis (Cass.) Baill.; Crossolepis Benth. nom. illeg., nom. superfl.; Crossolepsis N.T.Burb. orth. var.; Cyathopappus F.Muell.; Nematopus A.Gray; Pachysura F.Muell. orth. var.; Pachysurus Steetz; Angianthus auct. non J.C.Wendl.: Bentham, G. (5 January 1867)

= Gnephosis =

Erect yellow-heads

Genus of flowering plants

Gnephosis is a genus of about sixteen flowering plants in the family Asteraceae, all endemic to Australia. Plants in the genus Gnephosis are hairy annual herbs, the upper leaves arranged alternately, the lower leaves sessile and arranged in opposite pairs. The flowers are arranged in narrowly elliptic to oblong heads with up to 300 flowers, each with up to 16 bisexual florets. The achenes are pink or pale purple and more or less cone-shaped, sometimes without a pappus.

== Taxonomy ==
The genus Gnephosis was first formally described in 1820 by Henri Cassini in the Bulletin des Sciences par la Société Philomatique de Paris, and the first species he described (the type species) was Gnephosis tenuissima.

== Distribution ==
Plants in the genus Gnephosis occur in all Australian states and the Northern Territory.

== Species list ==
The following is a list of Gnephosis species accepted by the Australian Plant Census as at 6 May 2025:

- Gnephosis acicularis Benth. – zigzag gnephosis (W.A.)
- Gnephosis angianthoides (Steetz) Anderb. (W.A.)
- Gnephosis arachnoidea Turcz. – erect yellow-heads, cobwebby-headed gnephosis (W.A., N.T., S.A., Qld., N.S.W.)
- Gnephosis brevifolia (A.Gray) Benth. – short-leaved gnephosis (W.A.)
- Gnephosis cassiniana P.S.Short (W.A.)
- Gnephosis drummondii (A.Gray) P.S.Short (W.A., S.A., Vic.)
- Gnephosis eriocarpa (F.Muell.) Benth. – native camomile (N.S.W., S.A., N.T.)
- Gnephosis gynotricha Diels (W.A.)
- Gnephosis macrocephala Turcz. (W.A.)
- Gnephosis multiflora (P.S.Short) P.S.Short (W.A.)
- Gnephosis newbeyi P.S.Short (W.A.)
- Gnephosis setifera P.S.Short (W.A.)
- Gnephosis tenuissima Cass. – dwarf cup flower (W.A., S.A., N.T., N.S.W., Qld., Vic.)
- Gnephosis tridens (P.S.Short) P.S.Short (W.A.)
- Gnephosis trifida (P.S.Short) P.S.Short (W.A.)
- Gnephosis uniflora (Turcz.) P.S.Short (W.A.)

=== Formerly placed here ===
- Notisia intonsa (S.Moore) P.S.Short (as Gnephosis intonsa S.Moore)
