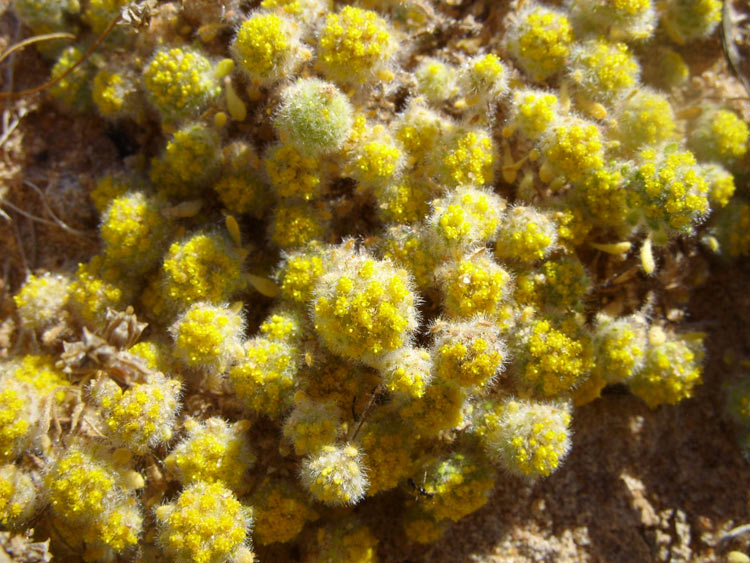
- Near Morawa

Conservation status
- Priority One — Poorly Known Taxa (DEC)

Scientific classification
- Kingdom: Plantae
- Clade: Tracheophytes
- Clade: Angiosperms
- Clade: Eudicots
- Clade: Asterids
- Order: Asterales
- Family: Asteraceae
- Genus: Gnephosis
- Species: G. setifera

Binomial name
- Gnephosis setifera P.S.Short

= Gnephosis setifera =

Species of plant

Gnephosis setifera is a species of flowering plant in the family Asteraceae and is endemic to the south-west of Western Australia. It is a small annual herb with sessile lance-shaped or spoon-shaped leaves at the base of the plant, compound heads of 10 to 45 yellow flowers, and oval, dark pink cypselas.

== Description ==
Gnephosis setifera is an annual plant with erect branches 2–5 cm (0.79–1.97 in) long with scattered bristles. Its leaves are arranged in a rosette at the base of the plant, the leaves sessile, lance-shaped with the narrower end towards the base, or spoon-shaped, 3.5–15 mm (0.14–0.59 in) long and 1.5–2.6 mm (0.059–0.102 in) wide with scattered bristles. The pseudanthia are arranged in flattened, oval compound heads of 10 to 45, 3–5 mm (0.12–0.20 in) high and 5–16 mm (0.20–0.63 in) in diameter with two or three rows of bracts, 1 to 4 leaf-like outer bracts and 8 to 12 inner bracts in 1 or 2 rows. There are 5 to 11 pseudanthia in each head. The petals yellow, form a tube with 5 lobes and there are 5 stamens. The fruit is an oval, dark pink cypsela, 0.44–0.57 mm (0.017–0.022 in) long, there is no pappus.

== Taxonomy and naming ==
Gnephosis setifera was first formally described in 1990 by Philip Short in the journal Muelleria from specimens collected 7 km (4.3 mi) south of Bunjil along the road to Latham. The specific epithet (setifera) means 'bearing bristles', referring to the trichomes of this species.

== Distribution ==
Gnephosis setifera is only known from the Monger Drainage System in the Avon Wheatbelt and Yalgoo bioregions of south-western Western Australia.
