= Gnephosis newbeyi =

Scientific classification
- Kingdom: Plantae
- Clade: Tracheophytes
- Clade: Angiosperms
- Clade: Eudicots
- Clade: Asterids
- Order: Asterales
- Family: Asteraceae
- Genus: Gnephosis
- Species: G. newbeyi

Binomial name
- Gnephosis newbeyi P.S.Short

Species of plant

Gnephosis newbeyi is a species of flowering plant in the family Asteraceae and is endemic to the south-west of Western Australia. It is an annual herb with linear leaves, compound heads of yellow flowers, and brown cypselas.

== Description ==
Gnephosis newbeyi is an annual herb with erect branches 3–13 cm (1.2–5.1 in) long. Its leaves are sessile, linear, 4–15 mm (0.16–0.59 in) long, 0.1–0.2 mm (0.0039–0.0079 in) wide and often slightly curved. The pseudanthia are arranged in oblong, compound heads of 3 to 8, 2.5–3.5 mm (0.098–0.138 in) long and 1.7–4 mm (0.067–0.157 in) in diameter with about 15 bracts 1.5–2.0 mm (0.059–0.079 in) long and 0.5–1.1 mm (0.020–0.043 in) wide at base of the heads. The petals are yellow and form a tube about 0.8 mm (0.031 in) long and there are three stamens. Flowering has been recorded in November, and the fruit is an oval, brown cypsela, 0.45 mm (0.018 in) long, and the pappus is bristly.

== Taxonomy and naming ==
Gnephosis newbeyi was first formally described in 2016 by Philip Short in the Journal of the Adelaide Botanic Gardens from specimens collected on the western edge of Lake King. The specific epithet (newbeyi) honours Ken Newbey who brought the author's attention to this species.

== Distribution and habitat ==
Gnephosis newbeyi grows in sandy saline soils surrounding salt lakes near Lake King, Pingrup and Peak Charles in the Mallee bioregion of south-western Western Australia.
