= Gnephosis multiflora =

Scientific classification
- Kingdom: Plantae
- Clade: Tracheophytes
- Clade: Angiosperms
- Clade: Eudicots
- Clade: Asterids
- Order: Asterales
- Family: Asteraceae
- Genus: Gnephosis
- Species: G. multiflora

Binomial name
- Gnephosis multiflora (P.S.Short) P.S.Short

Synonyms
- Chrysocoryne multiflora P.S.Short; Chrysocoryne sp. A

Species of plant

Gnephosis multiflora is a species of flowering plant in the family Asteraceae and is endemic to the south-west of Western Australia. It is an erect, annual herb with more or less elliptic or egg-shaped to lance-shaped leaves with the narrower end towards the base, compound heads of yellow flowers, and purplish cypselas.

== Description ==
Gnephosis multiflora is an erect annual herb that typically grows to a height of 2.5–4 cm (0.98–1.57 in). Its leaves are more or less elliptic or lance-shaped to egg-shaped with the narrower end towards the base, sometimes more or less linear, about 3–5 mm (0.12–0.20 in) long and 0.1–0.2 mm (0.0039–0.0079 in) wide. The pseudanthia are arranged in compound heads of 50 to 250, 5–20 mm (0.20–0.79 in) long and 2.5–4 mm (0.098–0.157 in) in diameter with 2 to 4 bracts 1.4–1.65 mm (0.055–0.065 in) long at base of the heads. The petals are yellow and form a tube 0.6–0.7 mm (0.024–0.028 in) long and there are three to five stamens. Flowering occurs in November, and the fruit is a purplish cypsela, 0.4 mm (0.016 in) long, but there is no pappus.

== Taxonomy and naming ==
This species was first formally described in 1983 by Philip Short who gave it the name Chrysocoryne multiflora in the journal Muelleria from specimens collected about "just east of Meckering" in 1978. In 1987, Short transferred the species to Gnephosis as G. multiflora in a later edition of Muelleria. The specific epithet (multiflora) means 'many-flowered'.

== Distribution and habitat ==
Gnephosis multiflora grows in sandy saline soils on river flats and the margins of salt lakes in the Avon Wheatbelt and Mallee bioregions of south-western Western Australia.
