= Pembertonia =

Pembertonia may refer to:

- Pembertonia (plant), a genus of plants in the family Asteraceae
- Pembertonia, a genus of wasps in the family Agaonidae, synonym of Meselatus
- Pembertonia, a genus of beetles in the family Dryophthoridae, synonym of Dryophthoroides
