= Gnephosis uniflora =

Scientific classification
- Kingdom: Plantae
- Clade: Tracheophytes
- Clade: Angiosperms
- Clade: Eudicots
- Clade: Asterids
- Order: Asterales
- Family: Asteraceae
- Genus: Gnephosis
- Species: G. uniflora

Binomial name
- Gnephosis uniflora (Turcz.) P.S.Short

Synonyms
- Angianthus myosuroides (A.Gray) Benth.; Chrysocoryne myosuroides A.Gray; Chrysocoryne uniflora Turcz.; Styloncerus myosurodes Kuntze orth. var.; Styloncerus myosuroides (A.Gray) Kuntze

Species of plant

Gnephosis uniflora is a species of flowering plant in the family Asteraceae and is endemic to the south-west of Western Australia. It is an erect, annual herb with narrowly elliptic, elliptic to egg-shaped or lance-shaped leaves with the narrower end towards the base, and covered with scale-like hairs, compound heads of 50 to 150 yellow flowers, and oval, purplish cypselas.

== Description ==
Gnephosis uniflora is an erect annual herb up to 8 cm (3.1 in) high and covered with scale-like hairs. Its leaves are narrowly elliptic, elliptic to egg-shaped or lance-shaped with the narrower end towards the base, 2–8 mm (0.079–0.315 in) long and 0.5–2 mm (0.020–0.079 in) wide and densely covered with scale-like hairs. The pseudanthia are arranged in cylindrical to narrowly oblong compound heads of 50 to 150, 15–44 mm (0.59–1.73 in) long and 1.5–2.5 mm (0.059–0.098 in) in diameter with 2 bracts and one or two florets in each pseudanthium. The petals are yellow and there are 5 stamens. Flowering occurs from September to November, and fruit is an oval, purplish cypsela, 0.4–0.5 mm (0.016–0.020 in) long, but there is no pappus.

== Taxonomy and naming ==
This species was first formally described in 1851 by Nikolai Turczaninow who gave it the name Chrysocoryne uniflora in the Bulletin de la Société impériale des naturalistes de Moscou from specimens collected by James Drummond. In 1987, Philip Sydney Short transferred the species to Gnephosis as G. uniflora in the journal Muelleria. The specific epithet (uniflora) means 'one-flowered'.

== Distribution ==
Gnephosis uniflora grows near the edges of saline depressions in the Avon Wheatbelt, Coolgardie, Geraldton Sandplains, Jarrah Forest and Mallee and Yalgoo bioregions of south-western Western Australia.
