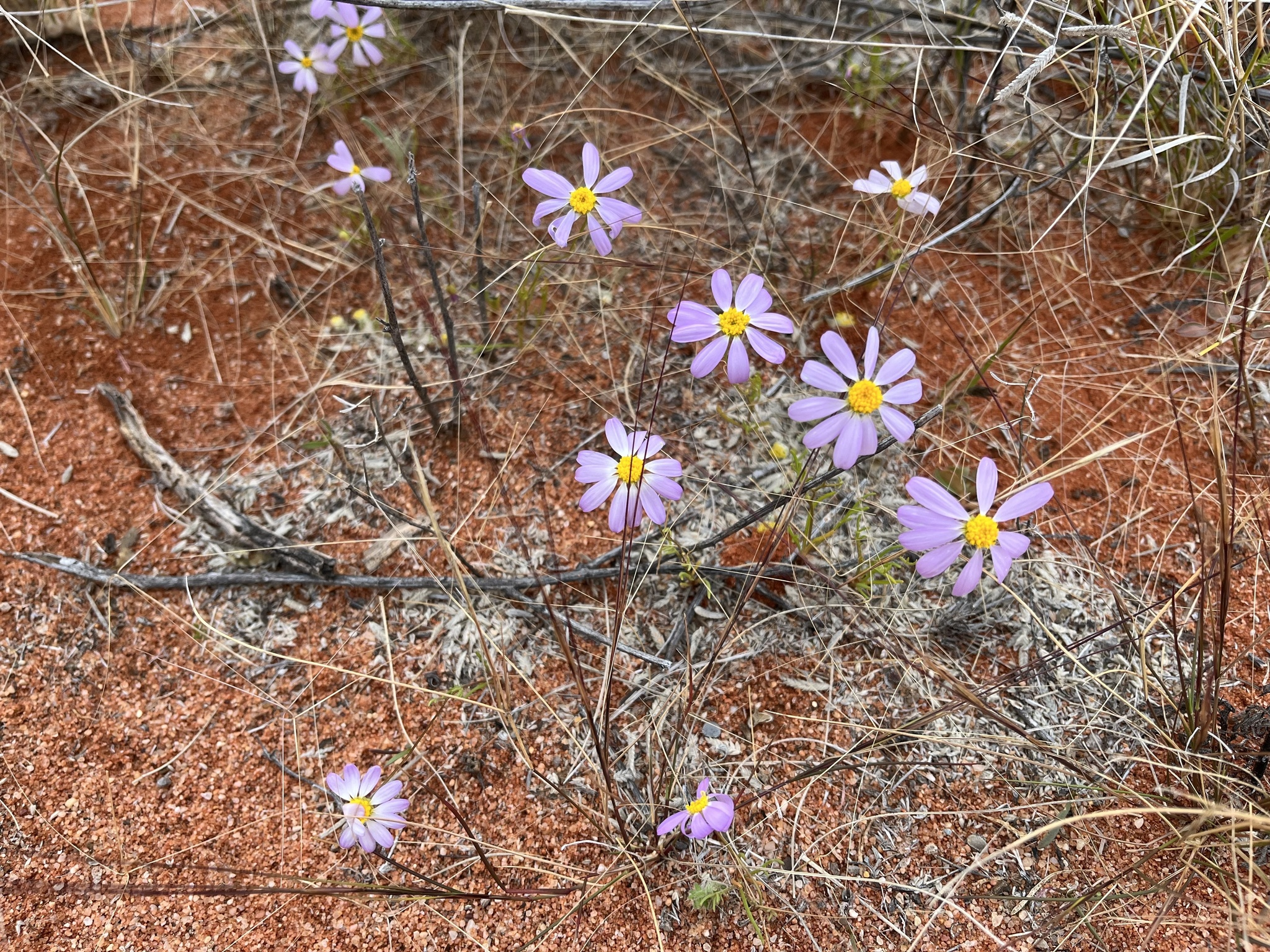
- Roebuckiella similis

Scientific classification
- Kingdom: Plantae
- Clade: Tracheophytes
- Clade: Angiosperms
- Clade: Eudicots
- Clade: Asterids
- Order: Asterales
- Family: Asteraceae
- Subfamily: Asteroideae
- Tribe: Astereae
- Genus: Roebuckiella; P.S.Short (2015)

Species
- 9; see text

Synonyms
- Roebuckia P.S.Short (2014), nom. illeg.

= Roebuckiella =

Genus of flowering plants

Roebuckiella is a genus of flowering plants in the sunflower family, Asteraceae. It includes nine species native to Australia. Seven species are endemic to Western Australia, and two are native to New South Wales, Queensland, and Western Australia.

== Species ==
Nine species are accepted in the genus Roebuckiella:

- Roebuckiella cheilocarpa (F.Muell.) P.S.Short – Western Australia
- Roebuckiella chinnockii (P.S.Short) P.S.Short – Western Australia
- Roebuckiella ciliocarpa (W.Fitzg.) P.S.Short – Western Australia, Queensland, and New South Wales
- Roebuckiella cuneata (P.S.Short) P.S.Short – Western Australia
- Roebuckiella halophila (P.S.Short) P.S.Short – Western Australia
- Roebuckiella lathamensis (P.S.Short) P.S.Short – Western Australia
- Roebuckiella nerrenensis (P.S.Short) P.S.Short – Western Australia
- Roebuckiella oncocarpa (Diels) P.S.Short – Western Australia
- Roebuckiella similis (P.S.Short) P.S.Short – Western Australia, Queensland, and New South Wales
