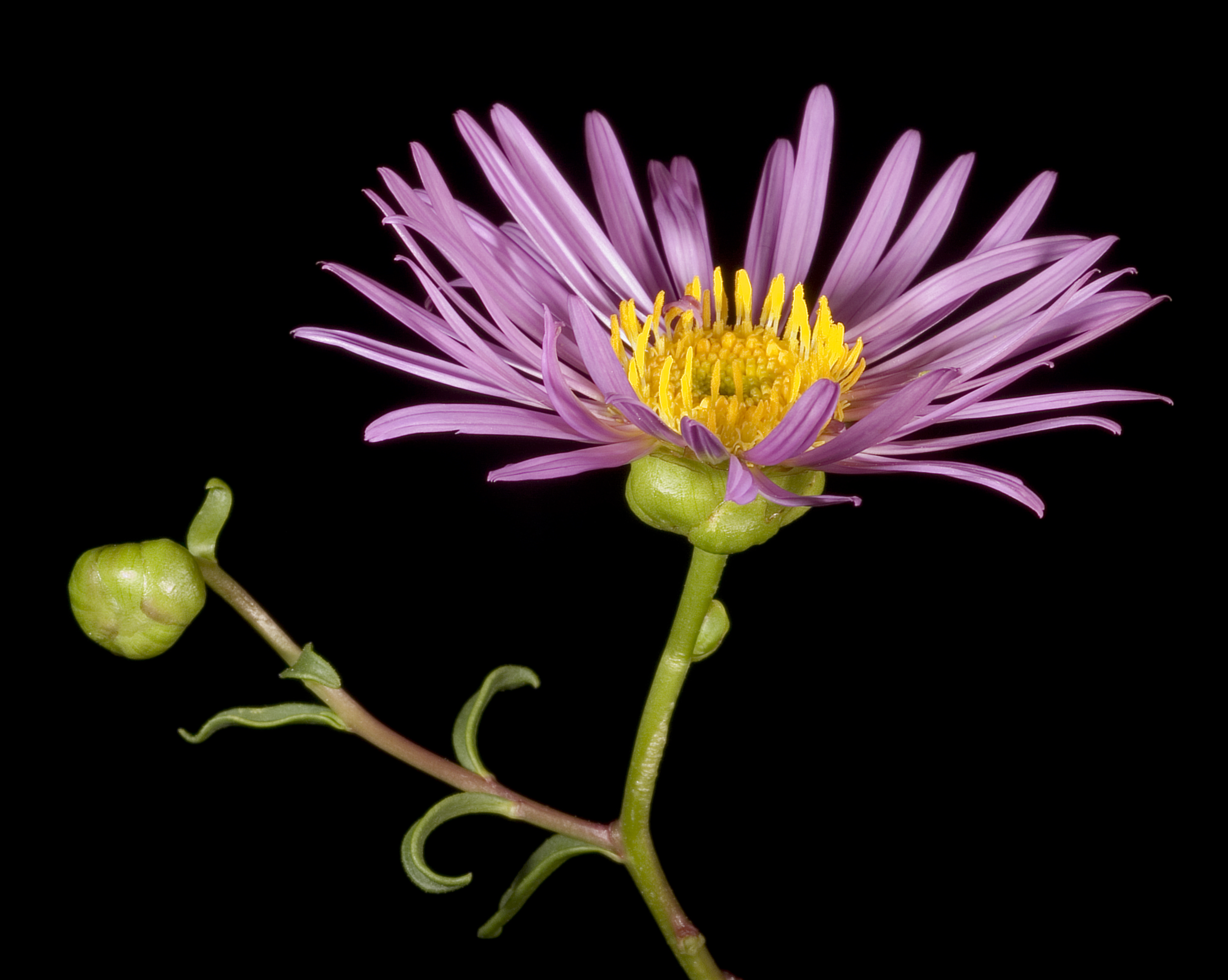

Scientific classification
- Kingdom: Plantae
- Clade: Tracheophytes
- Clade: Angiosperms
- Clade: Eudicots
- Clade: Asterids
- Order: Asterales
- Family: Asteraceae
- Genus: Pembertonia
- Species: P. latisquamea

Binomial name
- Pembertonia latisquamea (F.Muell.) P.S.Short

Synonyms
- Brachyscome latisquamea F.Muell. Heteropholis latisquamea (F.Muell.) F.Muell.

= Pembertonia latisquamea =

Species of flowering plant

Pembertonia latisquamea is a species of daisy (Asteraceae), native to Western Australia. It was first described by Ferdinand von Mueller in 1878 as Brachyscome latisquamea and transferred to the genus, Pembertonia in 2004 by Philip Short.

It is a climber or a shrub growing to 1.45 metres high, on white sand, red sand, silty clay and limestone, and flowers from September to October or July.
