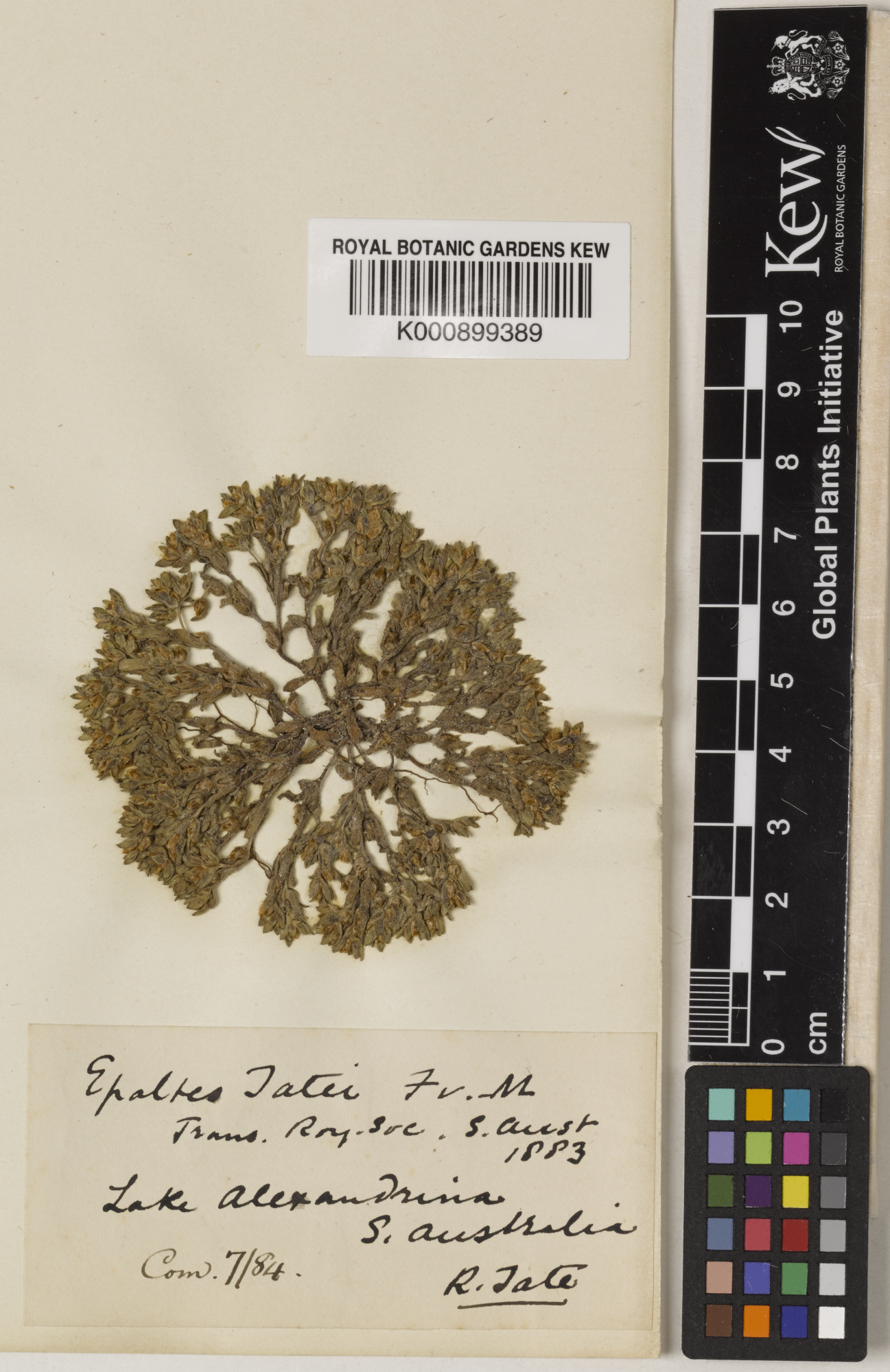

Scientific classification
- Kingdom: Plantae
- Clade: Tracheophytes
- Clade: Angiosperms
- Clade: Eudicots
- Clade: Asterids
- Order: Asterales
- Family: Asteraceae
- Subfamily: Asteroideae
- Tribe: Gnaphalieae
- Genus: Haegiela; P.S.Short & Paul G.Wilson
- Species: H. tatei

Binomial name
- Haegiela tatei (F.Muell.) P.S.Short & Paul G.Wilson

Synonyms
- Epaltes tatei F.Muell.; Erigerodes tatei (F.Muell.) Kuntze

= Haegiela =

Genus of plants

Haegiela is a genus of flowering plants in the family Asteraceae described as a genus in 1990. There is only one known species, Haegiela tatei, native to South Australia, and Victoria.
