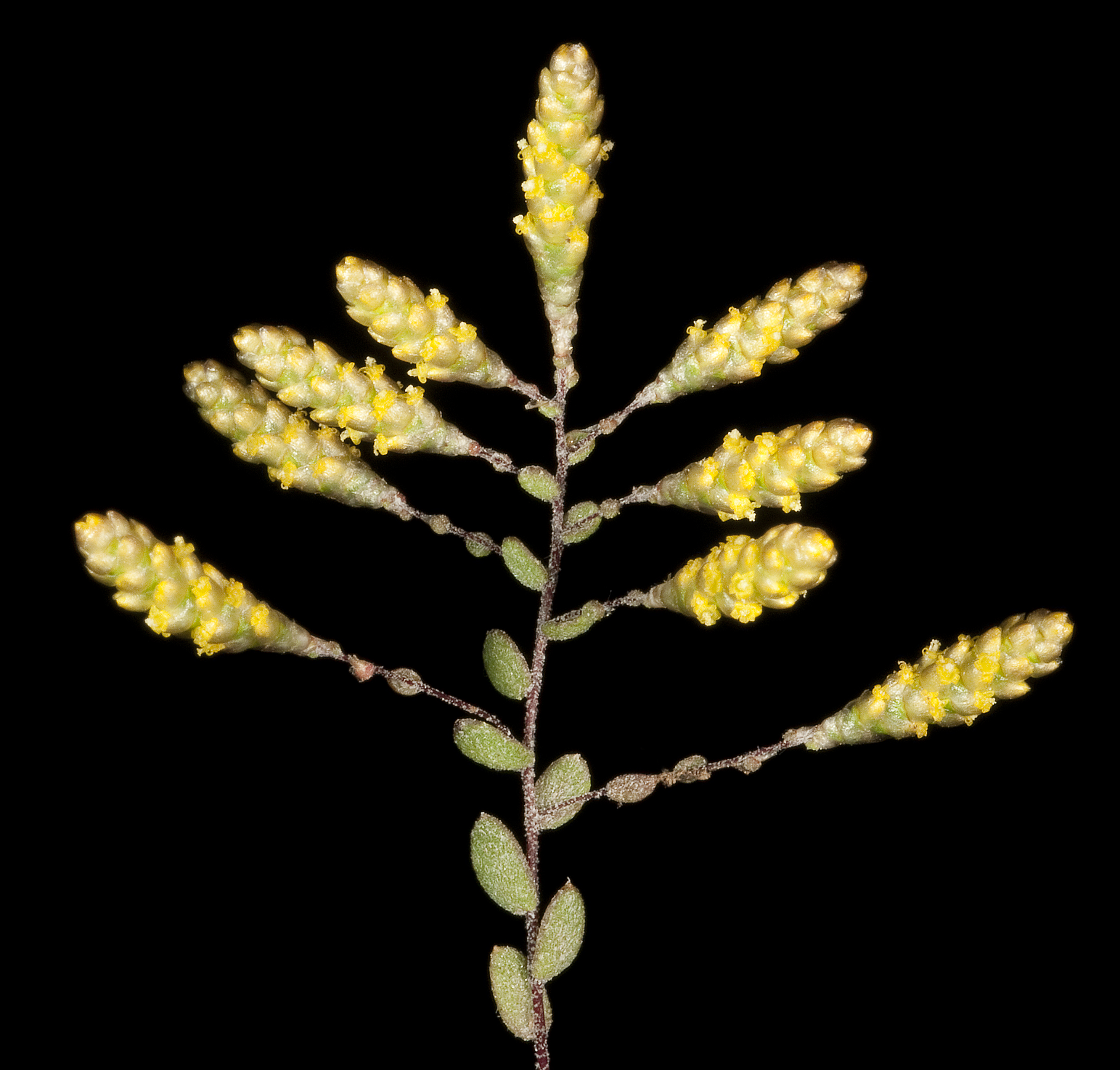

Scientific classification
- Kingdom: Plantae
- Clade: Tracheophytes
- Clade: Angiosperms
- Clade: Eudicots
- Clade: Asterids
- Order: Asterales
- Family: Asteraceae
- Genus: Gnephosis
- Species: G. tenuissima

Binomial name
- Gnephosis tenuissima Cass.

Synonyms
- List: Angianthus pusillus (Benth.) Benth.; Angianthus pusillus var. polyanthus Benth.; Angianthus pusillus (Benth.) Benth. var. pusillus; Chrysocoryne angianthoides F.Muell.; Chrysocoryne huegelii B.D.Jacks. orth. var.; Chrysocoryne hugelii A.Gray nom. illeg.; Chrysocoryne pusilla (Benth.) Endl.; Crossolepis pusilla Benth.; Gnephosis tenuissima Cass. isonym; Podolepis divaricata DC. nom. inval., pro syn.; Siloxerus pusillus (Benth.) Ising pro syn.; Styloncerus pusillus (Benth.) Kuntzepro

= Gnephosis tenuissima =

Dwarf cup flower

Species of plant

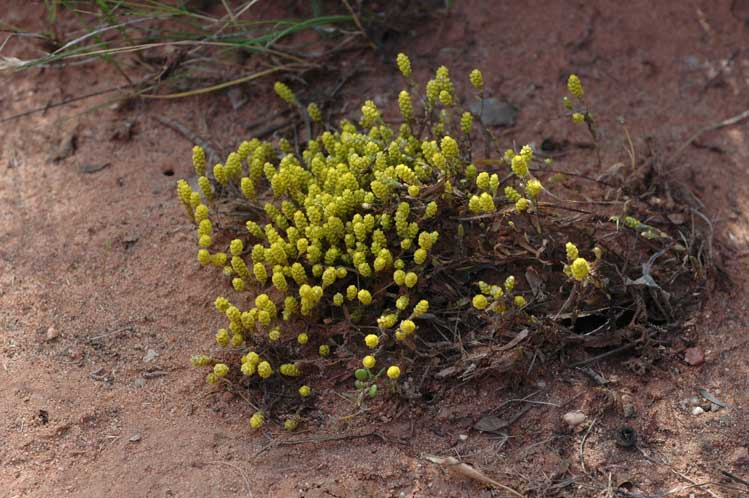
Habit in Gundabooka National Park

Gnephosis tenuissima, commonly known as dwarf cup flower, is a flowering plant in the family Asteraceae and is endemic to Australia. It is an annual herb with more or less erect branches, linear or narrowly elliptic leaves, compound heads of 20 to 80 yellow flowers, and oval, purplish cypselas.

== Description ==
Gnephosis tenuissima is an annual herb with scale like glandular hairs, and that typically grows to a height of 3–10 cm (1.2–3.9 in) high. Its leaves are linear to egg-shaped or lance-shaped with the narrower end towards the base, about 10 mm (0.39 in) long and about 3 mm (0.12 in) wide. The pseudanthia are arranged in variably shaped compound heads of 20 to 80, 10–22 mm (0.39–0.87 in) high and 3–7 mm (0.12–0.28 in) in diameter with four to ten rows of bracts. The petals are yellow, forming a tube with 5 lobes, and there are 5 stamens. The fruit is an oval, purplish cypsela, 0.35–0.50 mm (0.014–0.020 in) long, and the pappus is usually a jagged ring 0.1–0.2 mm (0.0039–0.0079 in) high.

== Taxonomy and naming ==
Gnephosis tenuissima was first formally described in 1820 by Henri Cassini in the Bulletin des Sciences par la Societe Philomatique de Paris 1820 from specimens collected in "la baie des Chiens-Marins" in Port Jackson. The specific epithet (tenuissima) means 'thinnest' or 'most delicate', referring to the plant.

== Distribution and habitat ==
Dwarf cup flower is widely distributed in Western Australia, South Australia, the Northern Territory, the western slopes and plains of New South Wales west of Warialda, and Queensland, but is rare in Victoria where it is confined to the far north-west of that state. It grows in a variety of soils, although often in saline soils.

== Conservation status ==
Gnephosis tenuissima is listed as "endangered" under the Victorian Government Flora and Fauna Guarantee Act 1988.
