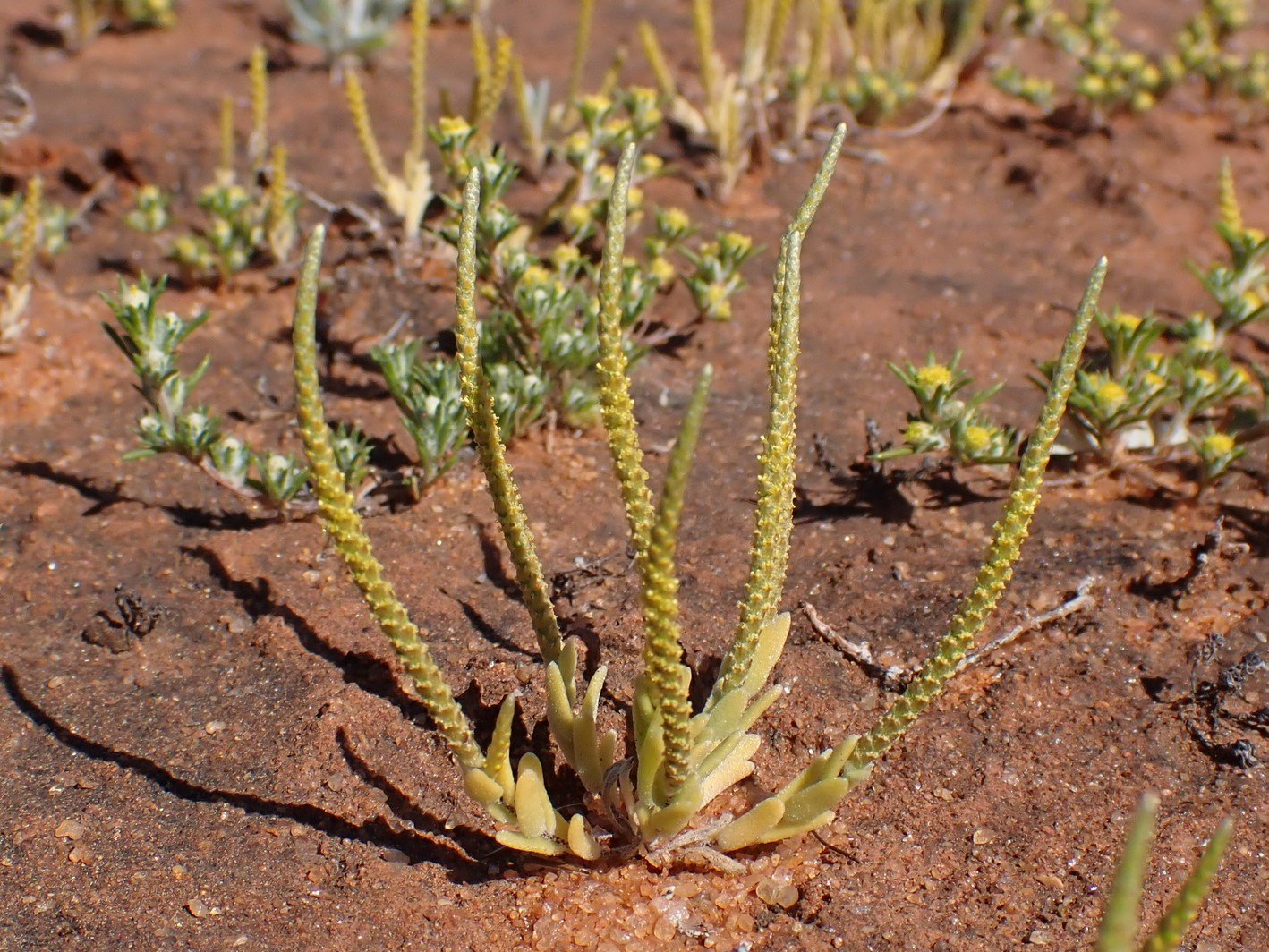
- North-west of Paynes Find

Scientific classification
- Kingdom: Plantae
- Clade: Tracheophytes
- Clade: Angiosperms
- Clade: Eudicots
- Clade: Asterids
- Order: Asterales
- Family: Asteraceae
- Genus: Gnephosis
- Species: G. trifida

Binomial name
- Gnephosis trifida (P.S.Short) P.S.Short

Synonyms
- Chrysocoryne sp. B; Chrysocoryne trifida P.S.Short

= Gnephosis trifida =

Species of plant

Gnephosis trifida is a species of flowering plant in the family Asteraceae and is endemic to the south-west of Western Australia. It is an erect or ascending, often branched, annual herb with narrowly elliptic or lance-shaped leaves with the narrower end towards the base, compound heads of 30 to 100 yellow flowers, and oval, purplish cypselas.

== Description ==
Gnephosis trifida is a erect or ascending annual herb 3–7 cm (1.2–2.8 in) high and sometimes unbranched or often with major branches from the base or upper nodes, and covered with glandular hairs. Its leaves are narrowly elliptic or lance-shaped with the narrower end towards the base, 2–8 mm (0.079–0.315 in) long and 1–2 mm (0.039–0.079 in) wide and densely covered with scale-like glandular hairs. The pseudanthia are arranged in cylindrical to narrowly oblong compound heads of 30 to 100, 10–40 mm (0.39–1.57 in) long and 1–2 mm (0.039–0.079 in) wide with 2 bracts and one or two florets in each pseudanthium. The petals are yellow, forming a tapering tube and there are five stamens. The fruit is an oval, purplish cypsela, 0.3–0.4 mm (0.012–0.016 in) long and there is no pappus.

== Taxonomy and naming ==
This species was first formally described in 1983 by Philip Short who gave in the name Chrysocoryne trifida in the journal Muelleria from specimens he collected 45.1 km (28.0 mi) north of Koorda in 1979. In 1987, Short transferred the species to Gnephosis as G. trifida in a later edition of Muelleria. The specific epithet (trifida) means 'three-forked', referring to the mirib of the bracts.

== Distribution ==
Gnephosis trifida grows near the edges of salt lakes and saline flats in the Avon Wheatbelt, Geraldton Sandplains, Murchison and Yalgoo bioregions of south-western Western Australia.
