= Gnephosis cassiniana =

Scientific classification
- Kingdom: Plantae
- Clade: Tracheophytes
- Clade: Angiosperms
- Clade: Eudicots
- Clade: Asterids
- Order: Asterales
- Family: Asteraceae
- Genus: Gnephosis
- Species: G. cassiniana

Binomial name
- Gnephosis cassiniana P.S.Short

Species of plant

Gnephosis cassiniana is a species of flowering plant in the family Asteraceae and is endemic to Western Australia. It is an erect, glabrous, annual herb with sessile, mainly elliptic or egg-shaped leaves, compound heads of yellow flowers, and pink cypselas.

== Description ==
Gnephosis cassiniana is an erect, glabrous, annual herb that typically grows to a height of 1–6 cm (0.39–2.36 in). Its leaves are sessile, mainly elliptic or egg-shaped, about 0.35–1.2 mm (0.014–0.047 in) long and 0.6–2.4 mm (0.024–0.094 in) wide. The pseudanthia are arranged in compound heads of 6 to 30, 3.5–12 mm (0.14–0.47 in) long and 0.6–2.4–10 mm (0.024–0.094–0.394 in) wide with 9 to 12 bracts 1.7–3 mm (0.067–0.118 in) long at base of the heads. The petals are yellow and form a tube 1.35–1.5 mm (0.053–0.059 in) long and there are five stamens. Flowering occurs from September to October and the fruit is a pink cypsela, 0.4–0.5 mm (0.016–0.020 in) long, but there is no pappus.

== Taxonomy and naming ==
Gnephosis cassiniana was first formally described in 1990 by Philip Short in the journal Muelleria from specimens collected about 2.5 km (1.6 mi) south of Binnu in 1983. The specific epithet (cassiniana) commemorates Alexandre Henri Gabriel de Cassini.

== Distribution and habitat ==
Gnephosis cassiniana grows in saline depressions and low wet areas in the Avon Wheatbelt, Geraldton Sandplains, Murchison and Yalgoo bioregions of Western Australia.
