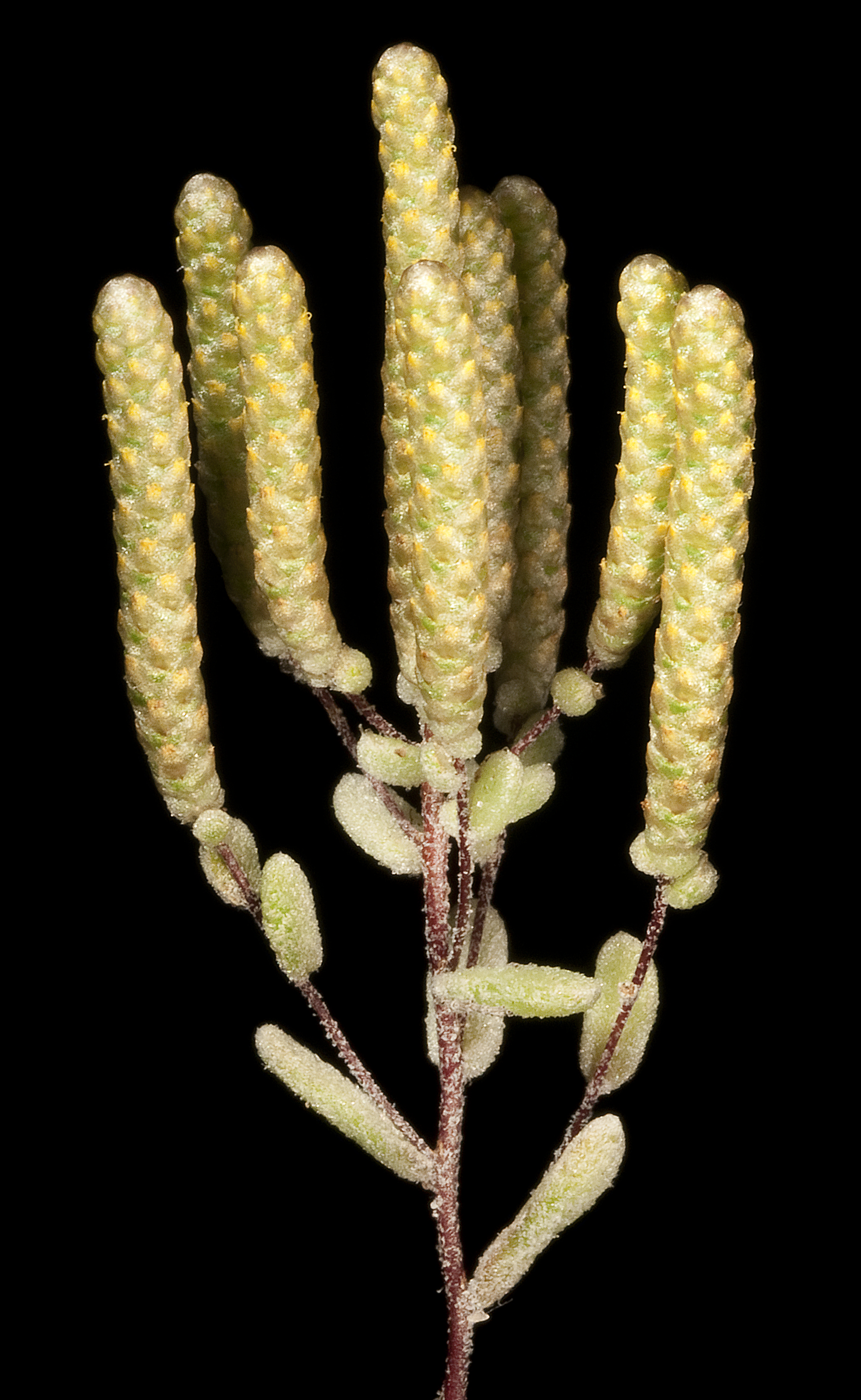

Scientific classification
- Kingdom: Plantae
- Clade: Tracheophytes
- Clade: Angiosperms
- Clade: Eudicots
- Clade: Asterids
- Order: Asterales
- Family: Asteraceae
- Genus: Gnephosis
- Species: G. drummondii

Binomial name
- Gnephosis drummondii (A.Gray) P.S.Short

Synonyms
- List: Angianthus tenellus (F.Muell.) Benth.; Chrysocoryne drummondii A.Gray; Chrysocoryne tenella F.Muell.; Chrysocoryne tenella F.Muell. isonym; Siloxerus tenellus (F.Muell.) Ostenf.; Styloncerus tenellus (F.Muell.) Kuntze; Chrysocoryne pusilla auct. non (Benth.) Endl.: Endlicher, S.F.L. (1843); Crossolepis pusilla auct. non Benth.: Hooker, W.J. in Hooker, W.J. (ed.) (1842)

= Gnephosis drummondii =

Species of plant

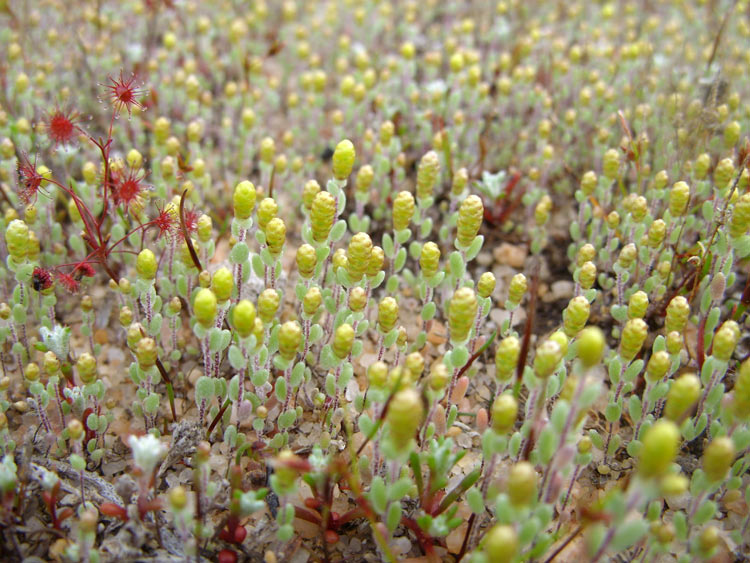
Habit near Eneabba

Gnephosis drummondii is a species of flowering plant in the family Asteraceae and is endemic to southern continental Australia. It is a small, erect herb with lance-shaped to narrowly elliptic leaves, compound heads of 40 to 150 yellow flowers, and purplish cypselas.

== Description ==
Gnephosis drummondii is an erect herb that typically grows to a height of up to 6 cm (2.4 in). Its leaves are lance-shaped with the narrower end towards the base, or narrowly ellipic to elliptic, 2–11 mm (0.079–0.433 in) long and 0.4–1 mm (0.016–0.039 in) wide. The pseudanthia are arranged in narrowly oblong compound heads of 40 to 150, 5–25 mm (0.20–0.98 in) long and 2–3.5 mm (0.079–0.138 in) wide with bracts 1.6–2.3 mm (0.063–0.091 in) long at base of the heads. The petals are yellow and there are usually three or four stamens. Flowering occurs from September to December and the fruit is a purplish cypsela, 0.4–0.5 mm (0.016–0.020 in) long, but there is no pappus.

== Taxonomy and naming ==
This species was first formally described in 1851 by Asa Gray who gave it the name Chrysocoryne drummondii in Hooker's Journal of Botany and Kew Garden Miscellany from specimens collected in the Swan River Colony by James Drummond. In 1987, Philip Sydney Short transferred the species to Gnephosis as G. drummondii. The specific epithet (drummondii) honours James Drummond.

== Distribution and habitat ==
This species of Gnephosis grows in winter-wet flats and granite depressions on sandy clay or sandy loam, sometimes in mallee eucalypt communities, yellow-box (Eucalyptus melliodora) and red-gum (Eucalyptus tereticornis) woodlands, in the Avon Wheatbelt, Esperance Plains, Geraldton Sandplains, Jarrah Forest, Mallee and Swan Coastal Plain bioregions of Western Australia, the Eyre Peninsula and south-east parts of South Australia and to the north and west of the Grampians in Victoria.

== Conservation status ==
Gnephosis drummondii is listed as "not threatened" by the Government of Western Australia Department of Biodiversity, Conservation and Attractions, "uncommon in South Australia" and as "endangered" in Victoria under the Victorian Government Flora and Fauna Guarantee Act 1988.
