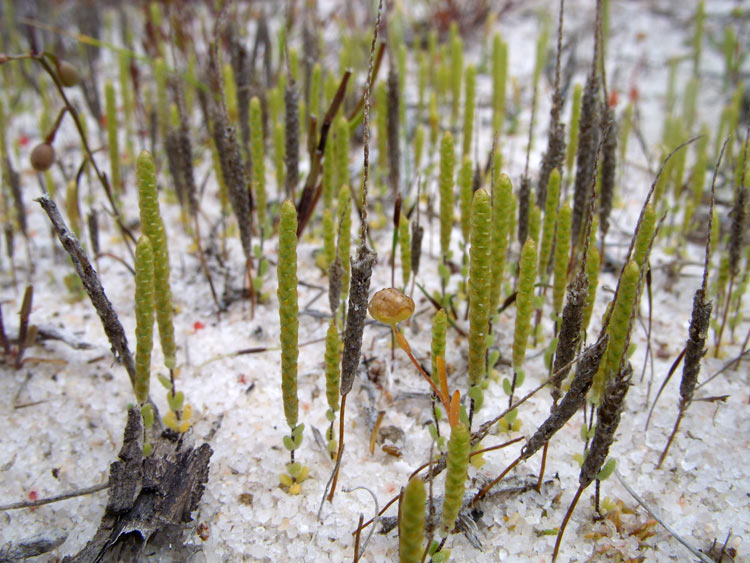
- Near Meckering

Scientific classification
- Kingdom: Plantae
- Clade: Tracheophytes
- Clade: Angiosperms
- Clade: Eudicots
- Clade: Asterids
- Order: Asterales
- Family: Asteraceae
- Genus: Gnephosis
- Species: G. tridens

Binomial name
- Gnephosis tridens (P.S.Short) P.S.Short

Synonyms
- Chrysocoryne sp. C; Chrysocoryne tridens P.S.Short

= Gnephosis tridens =

Species of plant

Gnephosis tridens is a species of flowering plant in the family Asteraceae and is endemic to the south-west of Western Australia. It is a small, erect, annual herb with linear, elliptic, lance-shaped or egg-shaped leaves at the base of the plant, compound heads of 50 to 250 yellow flowers, and oval, purplish cypselas.

== Description ==
Gnephosis tridens is an annual herb with erect branches 3–6 cm (1.2–2.4 in) high, sometimes forming branches at the base but never from the upper nodes. Its leaves are linear, elliptic, lance-shaped or egg-shaped with the narrower end towards the base, 3–8 mm (0.12–0.31 in) long and 0.5–1 mm (0.020–0.039 in) wide and densely covered with scale-like glandular hairs. The pseudanthia are arranged in cylindrical to narrowly oblong compound heads of 50 to 250, 30–50 mm (1.2–2.0 in) long and 1.5–2 mm (0.059–0.079 in) wide with 2 bracts and one floret in each pseudanthium. The petals are yellow, forming a tapering tube and there are 3 or 4 stamens. The fruit is an oval, purplish cypsela, 0.44–0.55 mm (0.017–0.022 in) long, there is no pappus.

== Taxonomy and naming ==
This species was first formally described in 1983 by Philip Short who gave in the name Chrysocoryne tridens in the journal Muelleria from specimens he collected 3.5 km (2.2 mi) east of Meckering in 1979. In 1987, Short transferred the species to Gnephosis as G. tridens in a later edition of Muelleria. The specific epithet (tridens) means 'three teeth', referring to the florets of this species.

== Distribution ==
Gnephosis tridens grows near the edges of salt lakes and saline flats in the Avon Wheatbelt, Coolgardie, Esperance Plains and Mallee bioregions of south-western Western Australia.
