= Notisia =

Scientific classification
- Kingdom: Plantae
- Clade: Tracheophytes
- Clade: Angiosperms
- Clade: Eudicots
- Clade: Asterids
- Order: Asterales
- Family: Asteraceae
- Subfamily: Asteroideae
- Tribe: Gnaphalieae
- Genus: Notisia; P.S.Short
- Species: N. intonsa

Binomial name
- Notisia intonsa (S.Moore) P.S.Short

Synonyms
- Gnephosis intonsa S.Moore

Genus of flowering plants

Notisia is a genus of flowering plants in the family Asteraceae. It includes a single species, Notisia intonsa, which is endemic to Western Australia where it grows in deserts and dry shrublands.

The species was first described as Gnephosis intonsa by Spencer Le Marchant Moore in 1899. In 2016 Philip Sydney Short placed the species in the newly described monotypic genus Notisia.
