= Gnephosis macrocephala =

Scientific classification
- Kingdom: Plantae
- Clade: Tracheophytes
- Clade: Angiosperms
- Clade: Eudicots
- Clade: Asterids
- Order: Asterales
- Family: Asteraceae
- Genus: Gnephosis
- Species: G. macrocephala

Binomial name
- Gnephosis macrocephala Turcz.

Species of plant

Gnephosis macrocephala is a species of flowering plant in the family Asteraceae and is endemic to the south-west of Western Australia. It is an erect annual herb with linear or lance-shaped leaves, compound heads of yellow flowers, and cone-shaped cypselas.

== Description ==
Gnephosis macrocephala is an annual herb with main branches 4–38 cm (1.6–15.0 in) long with a few hairs. Its leaves are linear or lance-shaped, 5–38 mm (0.20–1.50 in) long and 0.5–0.8 mm (0.020–0.031 in) wide. The pseudanthia are arranged in very broadly oval or oblong compound heads of about 20 to 200, 5.5–20 mm (0.22–0.79 in) long and 5.5–14 mm (0.22–0.55 in) wide with four bracts in two rows, the outer bracts 2.3–3.5 mm (0.091–0.138 in) long, the inner bracts up to 3–4.3 mm (0.12–0.17 in) long. The petals are dark yellow or yellow-orange, and form a tube 1.6–2.8 mm (0.063–0.110 in) long and there are five stamens. Flowering has mostly been observed in October and November and the cypselas are conical, 1.0–1.3 mm (0.039–0.051 in) long with soft hairs, the pappus a small cup about 0.26–0.6 mm (0.010–0.024 in) long.

== Taxonomy and naming ==
Gnephosis macrocephala was first formally described in 1851 by Nikolai Turczaninow in the Bulletin de la Société impériale des naturalistes de Moscou from specimens collected by James Drummond in the Swan River Colony. The specific epithet (macrocephala) means 'large headed'.

== Distribution and habitat ==
Gnephosis macrocephala grows in saline soil near salt lakes in the Avon Wheatbelt, Coolgardie, Geraldton Sandplains, Murchison and Yalgoo bioregions of south-western Western Australia.
