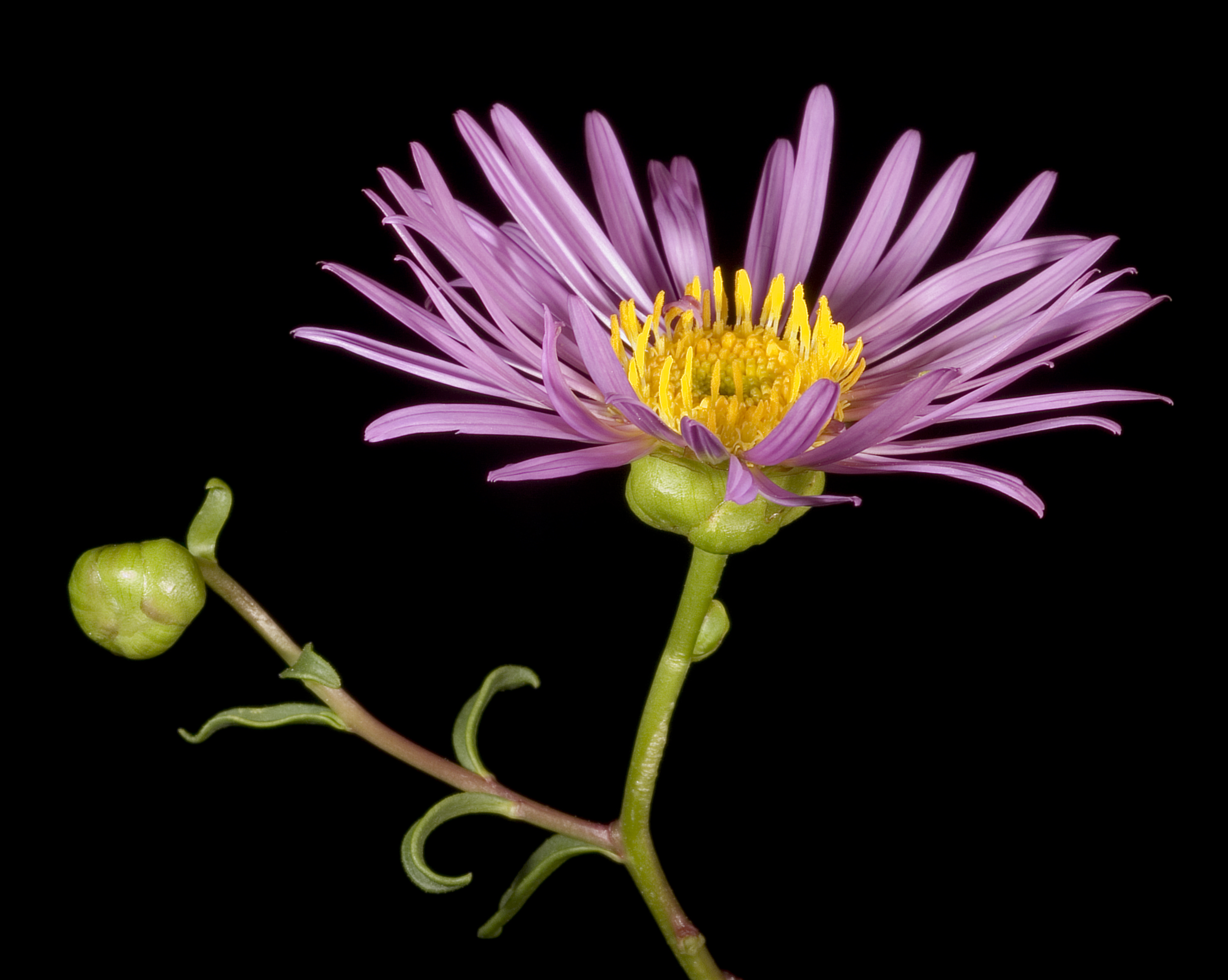
- Pembertonia latisquamea

Scientific classification
- Kingdom: Plantae
- Clade: Tracheophytes
- Clade: Angiosperms
- Clade: Eudicots
- Clade: Asterids
- Order: Asterales
- Family: Asteraceae
- Genus: Pembertonia; P.S.Short

= Pembertonia (plant) =

Species of flowering plant

Pembertonia is a monotypic genus of flowering plants belonging to the family Asteraceae. It only contains one known species, Pembertonia latisquamea (F.Muell.) P.S.Short

Its native range is Northwestern Australia.

The genus name of Pembertonia is in honour of Pemberton Walcott (1834–1883), an English plant collector who settled in Western Australia and was the namesake of the city Pemberton. The Latin specific epithet of latisquamea is a portmanteau word, 'latis-' is derived from latus meaning broad and '-squamea' is derived from squama meaning scale. Both the genus and species were first described and published in Muelleria Vol.20 on page 62 in 2004.
