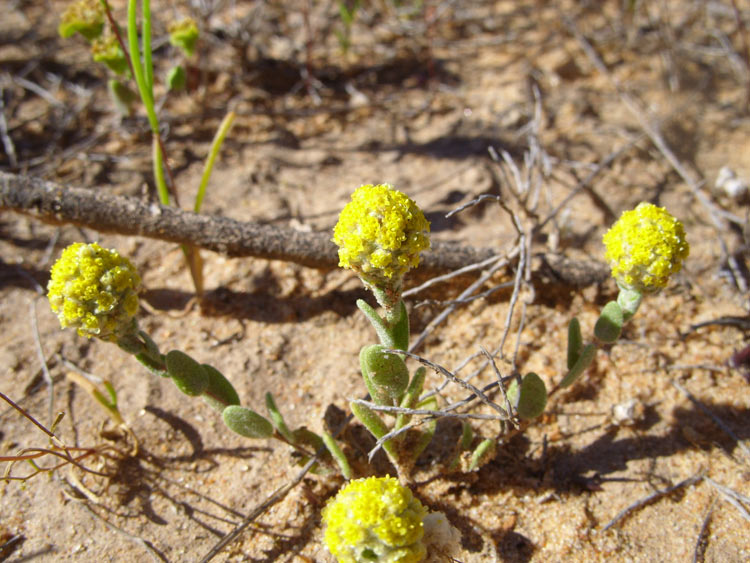
- Near Morawa

Scientific classification
- Kingdom: Plantae
- Clade: Tracheophytes
- Clade: Angiosperms
- Clade: Eudicots
- Clade: Asterids
- Order: Asterales
- Family: Asteraceae
- Genus: Gnephosis
- Species: G. angianthoides

Binomial name
- Gnephosis angianthoides (Steetz) Anderb.

Synonyms
- Calocephalus angianthoides (Steetz) Benth.; Calocephalus priceanus Domin; Leucophyta angianthodes Kuntze orth. var.; Leucophyta angianthoides (Steetz) Kuntze; Pachysurus angianthoides Steetz

= Gnephosis angianthoides =

Species of plant

Gnephosis angianthoides is a flowering plant in the family Asteraceae and is endemic to Western Australia. It is an erect annual herb with linear leaves, yellow flowers in egg-shaped heads, and purple cypselas.

== Description ==
Gnephosis angianthoides is an erect annual herb with major branches 2.5–20 cm (0.98–7.87 in) long and usually erect, sometimes low-lying. The leaves are sessile, elliptic to narrowly elliptic, sometimes egg-shaped to lance-shaped with the narrower end towards the base, about 2.2–19 mm (0.087–0.748 in) long and 1.1–3.4 mm (0.043–0.134 in) wide. The pseudanthia are arranged in compound heads of 8 to 280, 2.2–19 cm (0.87–7.48 in) long and 1.1–3.4 mm (0.043–0.134 in) wide with 6 or 7 bracts at the base of the heads. The petals are yellow and form a tube 1.0–1.2 mm (0.039–0.047 in) long and there are five stamens. Flowering mostly occurs from about late September to November and the fruit is a purple cypsela 0.4–0.5 mm (0.016–0.020 in) long, the pappus of 3 to 7 scale-like bristles about the length of the petals.

== Taxonomy and naming ==
This species was first formally described in 1845 by Joachim Steetz who gave it the name Pachysurus angianthoides in Lehmann's Plantae Preissianae from specimens collected at the base of Mount Eliza in 1839. In 1991, Arne Anderberg transferred the species to Gnephosis as G. angianthoides. The specific epithet (angianthoides) means 'Angianthus-like ', referring to the leaves.

== Distribution and habitat ==
Gnephosis angianthoides usually grows near salt lakes or samphire flats in the Avon Wheatbelt, Coolgardie, Geraldton Sandplains, Jarrah Forest, Mallee, Murchison, Nullarbor, Swan Coastal Plain and Yalgoo bioregions of Western Australia.
