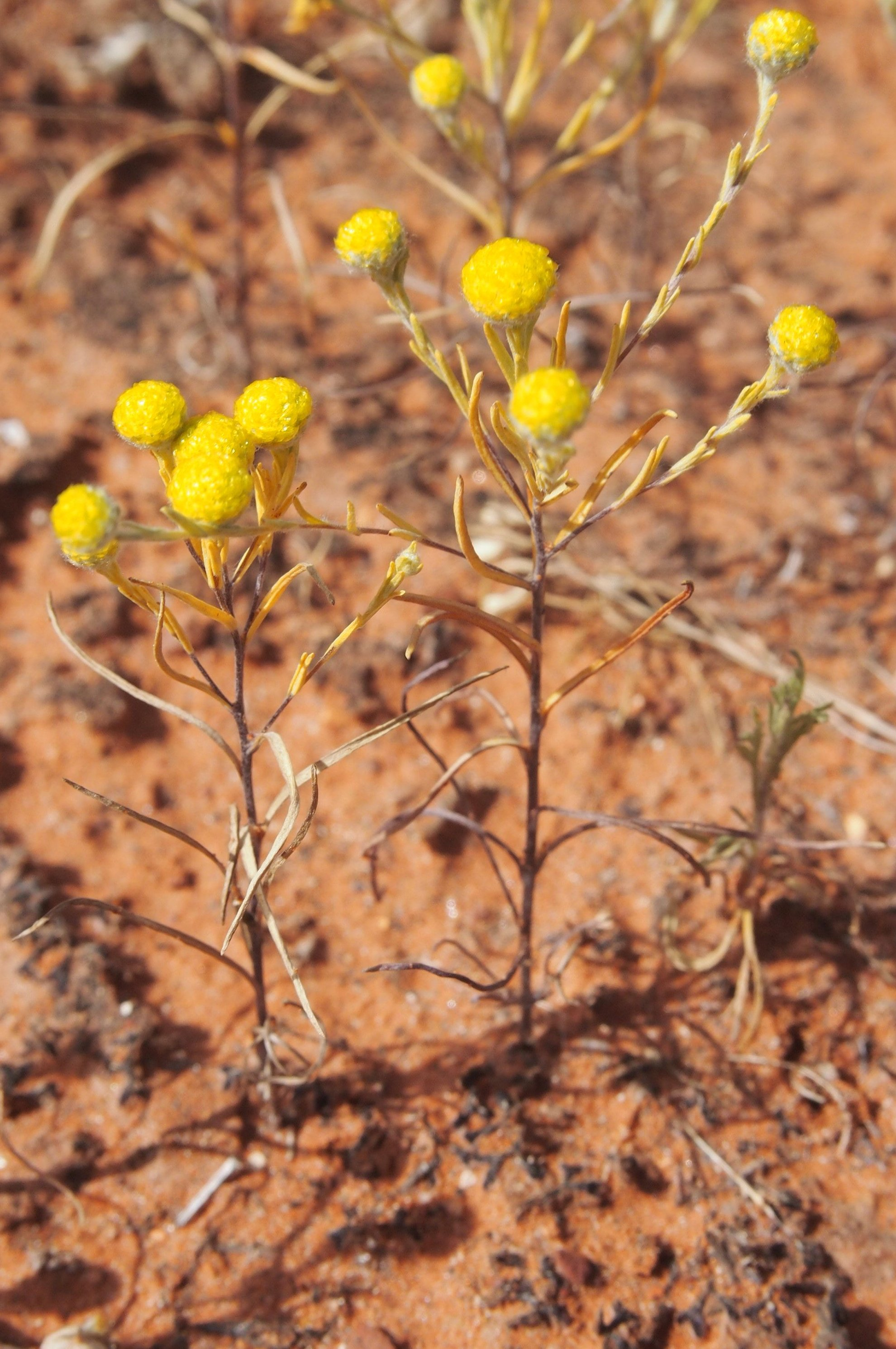

Scientific classification
- Kingdom: Plantae
- Clade: Tracheophytes
- Clade: Angiosperms
- Clade: Eudicots
- Clade: Asterids
- Order: Asterales
- Family: Asteraceae
- Genus: Gnephosis
- Species: G. arachnoidea

Binomial name
- Gnephosis arachnoidea Turcz.

= Gnephosis arachnoidea =

Species of plant

Gnephosis arachnoides, commonly known as erect yellow-heads or cobwebby-headed gnephosis, is a flowering plant in the family Asteraceae and is endemic to Australia. It has greenish-yellow flower heads at the ends of stems.

== Description ==
Gnephosis arachnoides is an annual herb with upright, slender, woolly stems becoming smooth with age and typically 5–30 cm (2.0–11.8 in) long. Leaves are arranged alternately, cottony, linear to lance-shaped, about 0.5–4 mm (0.020–0.157 in) wide and 6–30 mm (0.24–1.18 in) long. Flower heads more or less flattened and rounded, about 6–8 mm (0.24–0.31 in) in diameter, 6-11 bracts or 2 to 3 in a row and about 2 mm (0.079 in) long. Flowering may occur anytime of the year and the fruit is a brown achene about 1 mm (0.039 in) long.

== Taxonomy and naming ==
Gnephosis arachnoides was first formally described in 1851 by Nicolai Stepanovitch Turczaninow and the description was published in Bulletin de la Société Impériale des Naturalistes de Moscou. The specific epithet (arachnoidea) means 'like a spider's web', referring to the hairs on the stems and leaves.

== Distribution and habitat ==
Erect yellow-heads grows in a variety of habitats including on sandy to clay soils, and rocky locations, sometimes in saline soils and is widespread in Western Australia, the south of the Northern Territory, South Australia, Queensland and New South Wales.
