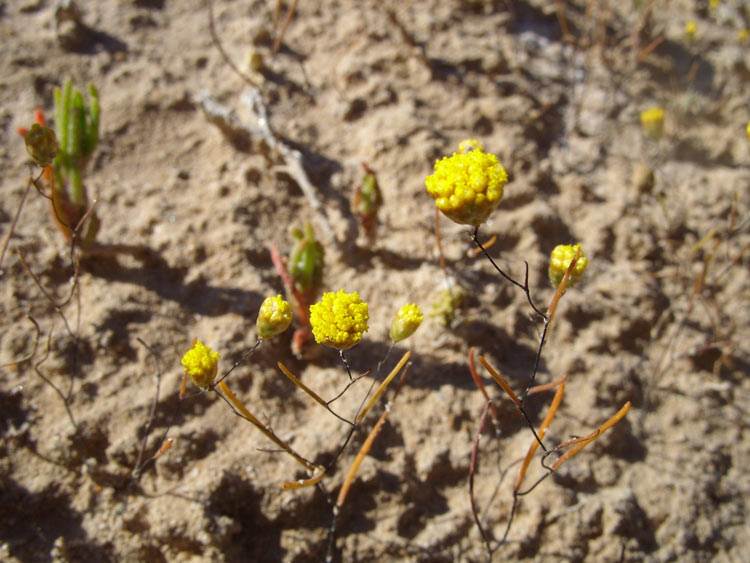
- Near Morawa

Scientific classification
- Kingdom: Plantae
- Clade: Tracheophytes
- Clade: Angiosperms
- Clade: Eudicots
- Clade: Asterids
- Order: Asterales
- Family: Asteraceae
- Genus: Gnephosis
- Species: G. acicularis

Binomial name
- Gnephosis acicularis Benth.

= Gnephosis acicularis =

Species of plant

Gnephosis acicularis, commonly known as zigzag gnephosis, is a flowering plant in the family Asteraceae and is endemic to the south-west of Western Australia. It is an erect annual herb with linear leaves, yellow flowers in egg-shaped heads, and brown, oval cypselas.

== Description ==
Gnephosis acicularis is a erect annual herb with erect stems and branches up to 80–330 mm (3.1–13.0 in) long. Leaves are arranged alternately, sessile, linear, about 3–47 mm (0.12–1.85 in) long and 0.1–0.9 mm (0.0039–0.0354 in) wide. The flowers are arranged in clusters of 6 to 50 in an oval or egg-shaped head 4.2–7 mm (0.17–0.28 in) long and 4–12 mm (0.16–0.47 in) in diameter. There are 15 to 20 bracts in about three rows at the base of the heads. The petals are yellow and form a tube 1.3–1.6 mm (0.051–0.063 in) long and there are five stamens. Flowering has been observed from late September to about mid November and the fruit is a brown achene 0.4–0.5 mm (0.016–0.020 in) long with the pappus about the length of the petals.

== Taxonomy and naming ==
Gnephosis acicularis was first formally described in 1867 by George Bentham in his Flora Australiensis from specimens collected by James Drummond. The specific epithet (acicularis) means 'needle-pointed', referring to the leaves.

== Distribution and habitat ==
Zigzag gnephosis is only known from sandy, salty soils near salt lakes in the Avon Wheatbelt, Coolgardie, Esperance Plains, Geraldton Sandplains, Mallee and Yalgoo bioregions of south-western Western Australia.
