= Hullsia =

Scientific classification
- Kingdom: Plantae
- Clade: Tracheophytes
- Clade: Angiosperms
- Clade: Eudicots
- Clade: Asterids
- Order: Asterales
- Family: Asteraceae
- Subfamily: Asteroideae
- Tribe: Astereae
- Subtribe: Brachyscominae
- Genus: Hullsia; P.S.Short
- Species: H. argillicola

Binomial name
- Hullsia argillicola P.S.Short
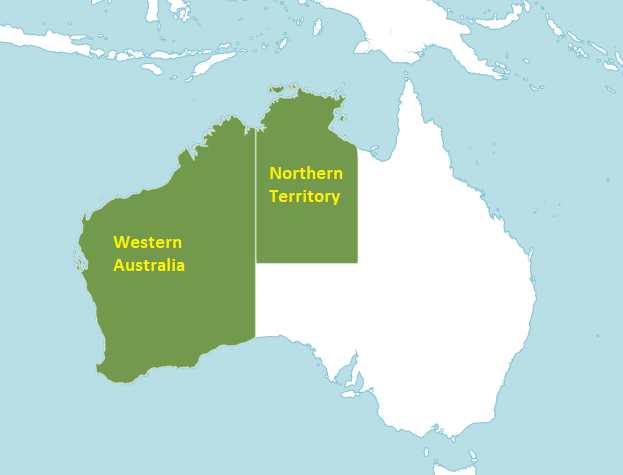
- Hullsia range in Australia

Species of plant

Hullsia is a genus of flowering plants in the family Asteraceae. It only contains one species, Hullsia argillicola.

It is native to Australia, mainly the states of Northern Territory and Western Australia, and it grows on heavy clay soils. Located in regions that flood frequently, such as plains, paddocks and swamps.

== Description ==
Subsucculent perennial, herb (with a well-developed taproot), it grows up to 1 m (3 ft 3 in) high. It has yellow flowers.

== Taxonomy ==
The genus name of Hullsia is in honour of Charles Stephen Hulls (c. 1835–1923), accompanied John McKinlay explorer and cattle grazier, on expeditions in Australia. The Latin specific epithet of argillicola means dwelling on clay, or 'argillicolous'. Due to the fact it was found in the clay soils of northern Australia.

Both genus and species were first described and published by Philip Sydney Short in Muelleria Vol.20 on page 58 in 2004.

The genus was once thought to be part of the Brachyscome genus.

Hullsia argillicola was verified by United States Department of Agriculture and the Agricultural Research Service on 20 November 2019.

== Other sources ==
- Barrie, F. R. 2011. Report of the General Committee: 11. Taxon 60:1212. Note: Committee recommends that it should not be treated as a homonym of Hulsea Torr. & A. Gray
- Brummitt, R. K. 2009. Report of the Nomenclature Committee for Vascular Plants: 60. Taxon 58:289-290. Note: Committee recommends that it should not be treated as a homonym of Hulsea Torr. & A. Gray
