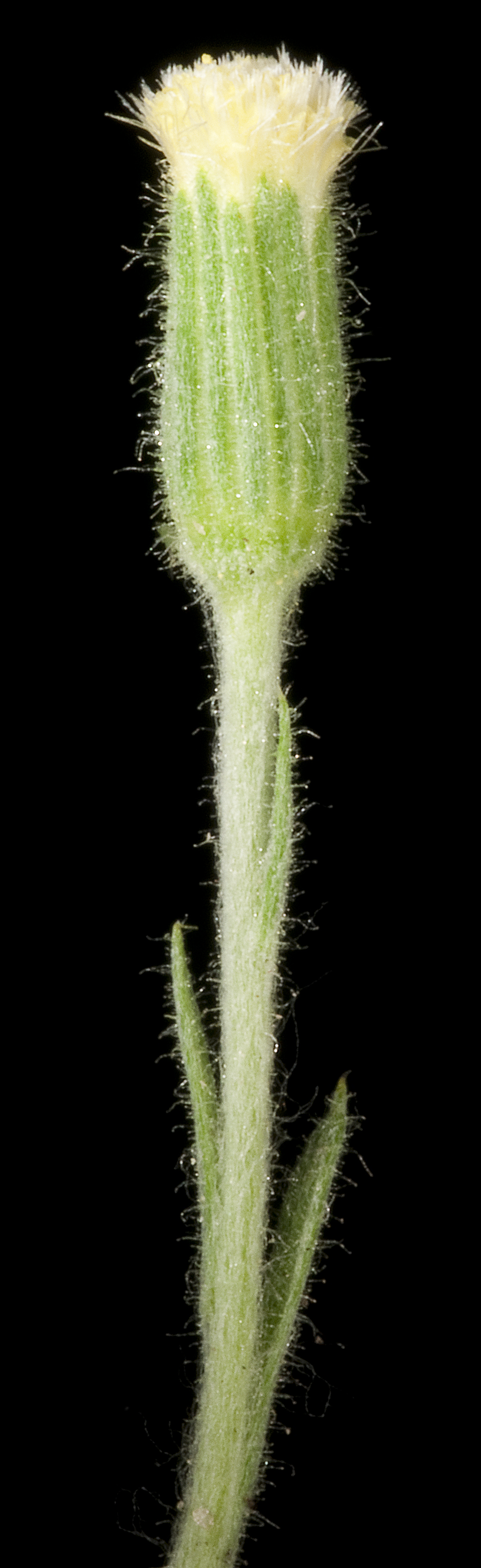
- Millotia tenuifolia

Scientific classification
- Kingdom: Plantae
- Clade: Tracheophytes
- Clade: Angiosperms
- Clade: Eudicots
- Clade: Asterids
- Order: Asterales
- Family: Asteraceae
- Subfamily: Asteroideae
- Tribe: Gnaphalieae
- Genus: Millotia; Cass.

Synonyms
- Millottia Stapf, alternate spelling; Scyphocoronis A.Gray; Toxanthes Turcz.

= Millotia =

Genus of flowering plants

Millotia is a genus of small annual herbs in the tribe Gnaphalieae within the family Asteraceae.

The genus name honours French historian Claude-François-Xavier Millot.

Species

All known species are endemic to Australia:

- Millotia depauperata Stapf
- Millotia dimorpha P.S.Short
- Millotia eichleri P.S.Short
- Millotia falcata P.S.Short
- Millotia greevesii F.Muell. - creeping millotia
- Millotia incurva (D.A.Cooke) P.S.Short
- Millotia jacksonii P.S.Short
- Millotia major (Turcz.) P.S.Short
- Millotia muelleri (Sond.) P.S.Short - common bow-flower
- Millotia myosotidifolia (Benth.) Steetz - broad-leaved millotia
- Millotia perpusilla (Turcz.) P.S.Short - tiny bow-flower
- Millotia pilosa P.S.Short
- Millotia steetziana P.S.Short
- Millotia tenuifolia Cass. - soft millotia
