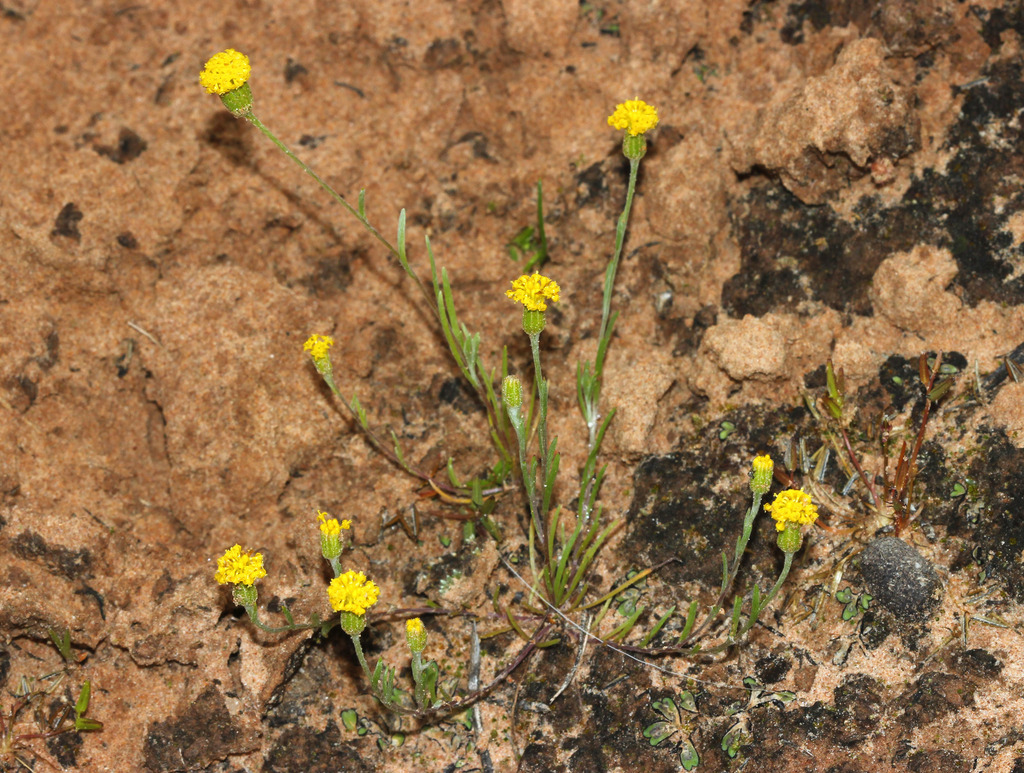

Scientific classification
- Kingdom: Plantae
- Clade: Tracheophytes
- Clade: Angiosperms
- Clade: Eudicots
- Clade: Asterids
- Order: Asterales
- Family: Asteraceae
- Genus: Millotia
- Species: M. greevesii

Binomial name
- Millotia greevesii F.Muell.

= Millotia greevesii =

Species of plant

Millotia greevesii is a species of small annual herb in the tribe Gnaphalieae within the Asteraceae family, endemic to the inland of all states and territories of Australia except Western Australia, Victoria and Tasmania.

It was first described in 1862 by Ferdinand von Mueller from a specimen collected by Hermann Beckler in the Barrier Ranges.
