= Gnephosis gynotricha =

Scientific classification
- Kingdom: Plantae
- Clade: Tracheophytes
- Clade: Angiosperms
- Clade: Eudicots
- Clade: Asterids
- Order: Asterales
- Family: Asteraceae
- Genus: Gnephosis
- Species: G. gynotricha

Binomial name
- Gnephosis gynotricha Diels

Species of plant

Gnephosis gynotricha is a species of flowering plant in the family Asteraceae and is endemic to the north of Western Australia. It is an annual herb with linear or narrowly elliptic leaves, compound heads of yellow flowers, and cone-shaped cypselas.

== Description ==
Gnephosis gynotricha is an annual herb with main branches 2–18 cm (0.79–7.09 in) long with a few hairs. Its leaves are linear or narrowly elliptic, 5–45 mm (0.20–1.77 in) long and 0.5–2.5 mm (0.020–0.098 in) wide. The pseudanthia are arranged in broadly ellipic to elliptic or egg-shaped compound heads of 20 to 100 and 4.5–18 mm (0.18–0.71 in) long and 5–10 mm (0.20–0.39 in) wide with four bracts in two rows, the outer bracts 1.3–2.2 mm (0.051–0.087 in) long, the inner bracts 2.6–3.2 mm (0.10–0.13 in) long. The petals are yellow and form a tube 1.5–2 mm (0.059–0.079 in) long and there are five stamens. Flowering has been observed from August to September and the cypselas are conical, 0.85–1.05 mm (0.033–0.041 in) long with long, straight hairs, but there is usually no pappus.

== Taxonomy and naming ==
Gnephosis gynotricha was first formally described in 1905 by Ludwig Diels in Botanische Jahrbücher für Systematik, Pflanzengeschichte und Pflanzengeographie from specimens he collected near Carnarvon. The specific epithet (gynotricha) means 'hairy woman', referring to the hairy ovary.

== Distribution and habitat ==
Gnephosis gynotricha grows in sand or loam in arid shrubland on undulating plains and sandhills in the Carnarvon and Yalgoo bioregions of northern Western Australia.
