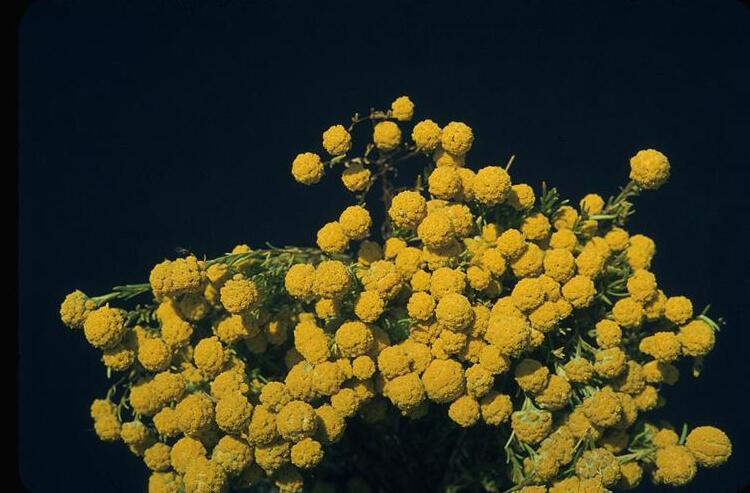
- Near Carnarvon

Scientific classification
- Kingdom: Plantae
- Clade: Tracheophytes
- Clade: Angiosperms
- Clade: Eudicots
- Clade: Asterids
- Order: Asterales
- Family: Asteraceae
- Genus: Gnephosis
- Species: G. brevifolia

Binomial name
- Gnephosis brevifolia (A.Gray) Benth.

Synonyms
- Crossolepis brevifolia A.Gray; Crossolepis eriocephala A.Gray; Gnephosis eriocephala (A.Gray) Benth.; Gnephosis sp. 'Norseman' (K.R.Newbey 8096) WA Herbarium; Myriocephalus cotuloides Turcz.; Myriocephalus villosissimus Turcz.

= Gnephosis brevifolia =

Species of plant

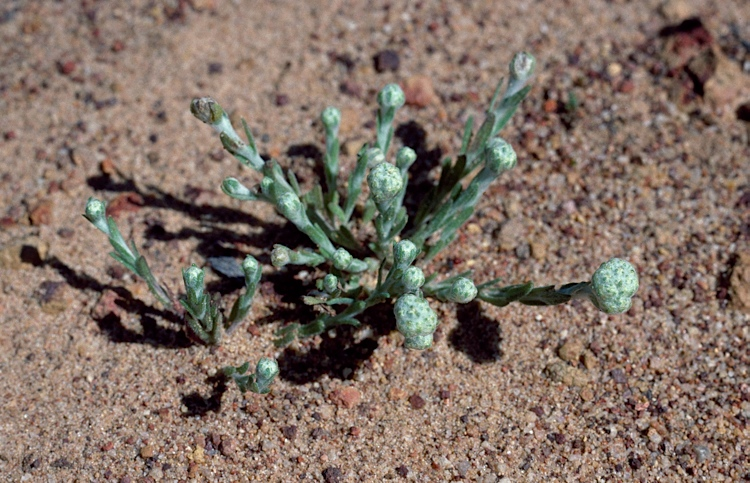
Habit, near to flowering, north of Northampton

Gnephosis brevifolia, commonly known as short-leaved gnephosis, is a species of flowering plant in the family Asteraceae and is endemic to Western Australia. It is an erect, annual herb with sessile narrowly elliptic, lance-shaped or linear leaves, compound heads of yellow flowers, and dark pink or brownish cypselas.

== Description ==
Gnephosis brevifolia is an erect annual herb with major branches 3–20 cm (1.2–7.9 in) long and usually erect, sometimes low-lying. The leaves are sessile, narrowly elliptic, lance-shaped or linear, about 3–18 mm (0.12–0.71 in) long and 0.3–1.5 mm (0.012–0.059 in) wide. The pseudanthia are arranged in compound heads of 14 to 30, 4–9 mm (0.16–0.35 in) long and 4–10 mm (0.16–0.39 in) wide with 8 to 11 bracts in two rows at the base of the heads. The petals are yellow and form a tube 1.4–1.8 mm (0.055–0.071 in) long and there are five stamens. Flowering occurs from about late August to October and the fruit is a dark pink, pinkish brown or pale brown cypsela, 0.26–0.35 mm (0.010–0.014 in) long, but there is no pappus.

== Taxonomy and naming ==
This species was first formally described in 1851 by Asa Gray who gave it the name Crossolepis brevifolia in Hooker's Journal of Botany and Kew Garden Miscellany from specimens collected in the Swan River Colony by James Drummond in 1850. In 1867, George Bentham transferred the species to Gnephosis as G. brevifolia in his Flora Australiensis. The specific epithet (brevifolia) means 'short-leaved '.

== Distribution and habitat ==
Gnephosis brevifolia is endemic to arid and semi-arid part of Western Australia from about the Pilbara to near Norseman and the Parker Range in the Avon Wheatbelt, Carnarvon, Coolgardie Gascoyne, Geraldton Sandplains, Gibson Desert, Little Sandy Desert, Murchison, Pilbara and Yalgoo bioregions of Western Australia.
