= Angianthus conocephalus =

Scientific classification
- Kingdom: Plantae
- Clade: Tracheophytes
- Clade: Angiosperms
- Clade: Eudicots
- Clade: Asterids
- Order: Asterales
- Family: Asteraceae
- Genus: Angianthus
- Species: A. conocephalus

Binomial name
- Angianthus conocephalus (J.M.Black) Short

Synonyms
- Angianthus brachypappus var. conocephalus J.M.Black; Angianthus brachypappus auct. non F.Muell.: Grieve, B.J. & Blackall, W.E. (1975)

Species of plant

Angianthus conocephalus is a species of flowering plant in the family Asteraceae, and is endemic to southern continental Australia. It is a low annual herb with hairy linear leaves, more or less oval compound heads of yellow flowers, and egg-shaped or oval achenes with a ring-shaped pappus.

== Description ==
Angianthus conocephalus is an ascending or low-lying annual herb that typically grows to a height of 3–8 cm (1.2–3.1 in), the stems not distinct from the major branches. The leaves are variously hairy, usually linear, 5–15 mm (0.20–0.59 in) long and 0.1 mm (0.0039 in) wide. The flowers are yellow and borne in egg-shaped compound heads of 30 to 100 pseudanthia, the heads 8–16 mm (0.31–0.63 in) long and 4–6 mm (0.16–0.24 in) wide. Flowering occurs from August to October, and the achenes are oval, 0.4–0.7 mm (0.016–0.028 in) long and about 0.3 mm (0.012 in) wide, the pappus ring-shaped.

== Taxonomy ==
This species was first formally described in 1929 by John McConnell Black who gave it the name Angianthus brachypappus var. conocephalus in the Flora of South Australia from specimens collected near Ooldea. In 1983, Philip Sydney Short raised the variety to species status as Angianthus conocephalus in the journal Muelleria. The specific epithet (conocephalus) means 'cone-headed'.

== Distribution and habitat ==
This species of Angianthus grows in calcareous soils and clay in the Coolgardie, Hampton, Mallee and Nullarbor bioregions of Western Australia and the Eyre Yorke Block, Gawler, Great Victoria Desert and Nullarbor bioregions of South Australia.

== Conservation status ==
Angianthus conocephalus is listed as "not threatened" by the Government of Western Australia Department of Biodiversity, Conservation and Attractions.
