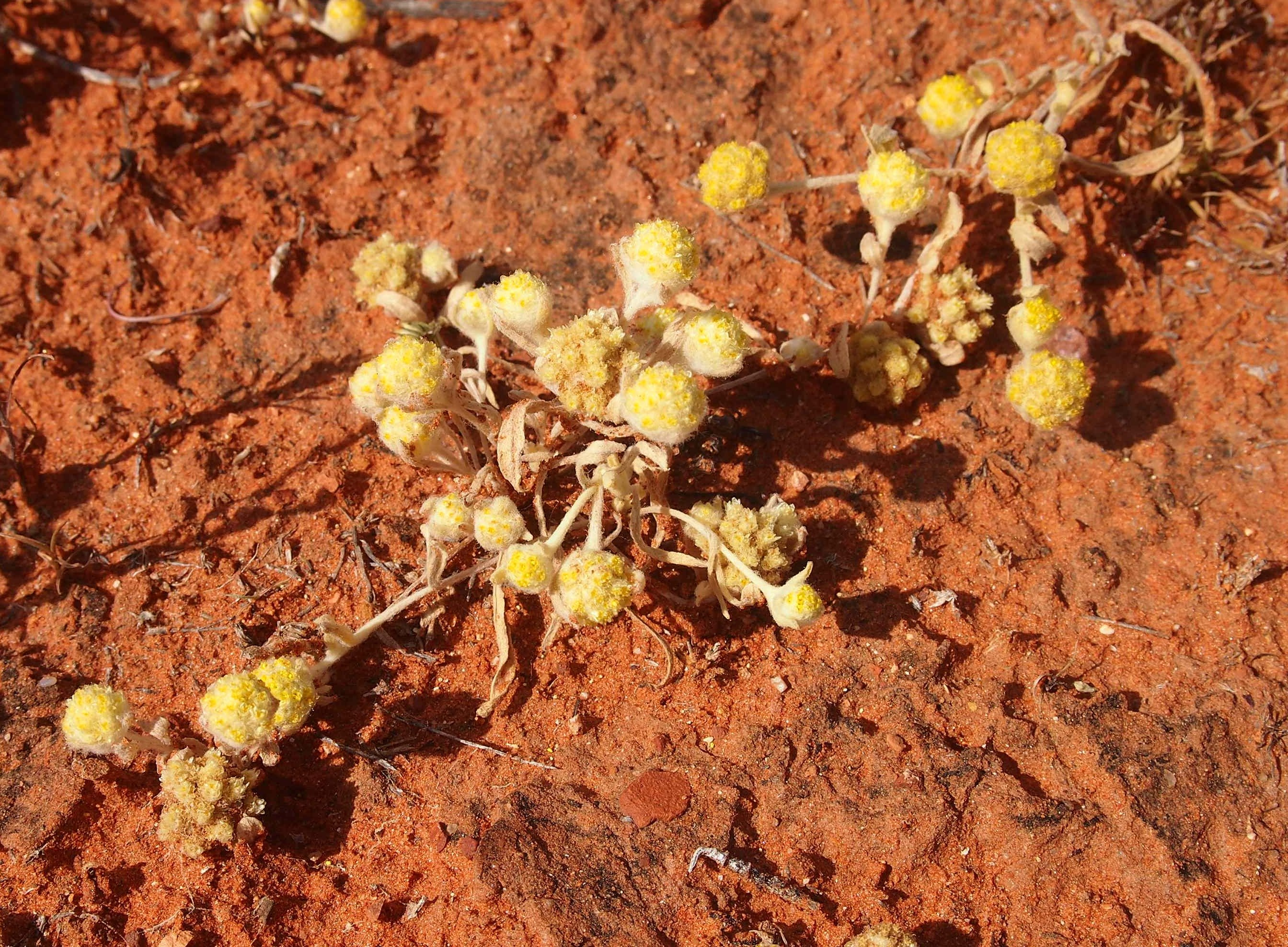

Scientific classification
- Kingdom: Plantae
- Clade: Tracheophytes
- Clade: Angiosperms
- Clade: Eudicots
- Clade: Asterids
- Order: Asterales
- Family: Asteraceae
- Genus: Gnephosis
- Species: G. eriocarpa

Binomial name
- Gnephosis eriocarpa (F.Muell.) Benth.

Synonyms
- Skirrhophorus eriocarpus F.Muell.; Skirrophorus eriocarpus F.Muell. orth. var.

= Gnephosis eriocarpa =

Native camomile

Species of plant

Gnephosis eriocarpa, commonly known as native camomile, is a flowering plant in the family Asteraceae and is endemic to Australia. It is a spreading forb with rounded flower heads and variable leaves.

== Description ==
Gnephosis eriocarpa is an annual, prostrate or spreading forb with woolly stems about 5–23 cm (2.0–9.1 in) long. Leaves are variable, 9–45 mm (0.35–1.77 in) long, 1.5–9 mm (0.059–0.354 in) wide and thickly covered with hairs. The flower heads are rounded to broadly egg-shaped, 5–12 mm (0.20–0.47 in) long and 5.5–13 mm (0.22–0.51 in) in diameter and outer bracts woolly. Flowering may occur any time of the year, often after heavy rainfall and the fruit is an achene about 1.1 mm (0.043 in) long densely covered in hairs.

== Taxonomy and naming ==
This species was described in 1863 by Ferdinand von Mueller who gave it the name Skirrhophorus eriocarpus. In 1867 George Bentham changed the name to Gnephosis eriocarpa and the description was published in Flora Australiensis. The specific epithet (eriocarpus) means "woolly-fruited".

== Distribution and habitat ==
Native camomile usually grows in mulga bushland on sandy soils and clay pan areas in New South Wales, South Australia and the Northern Territory.
