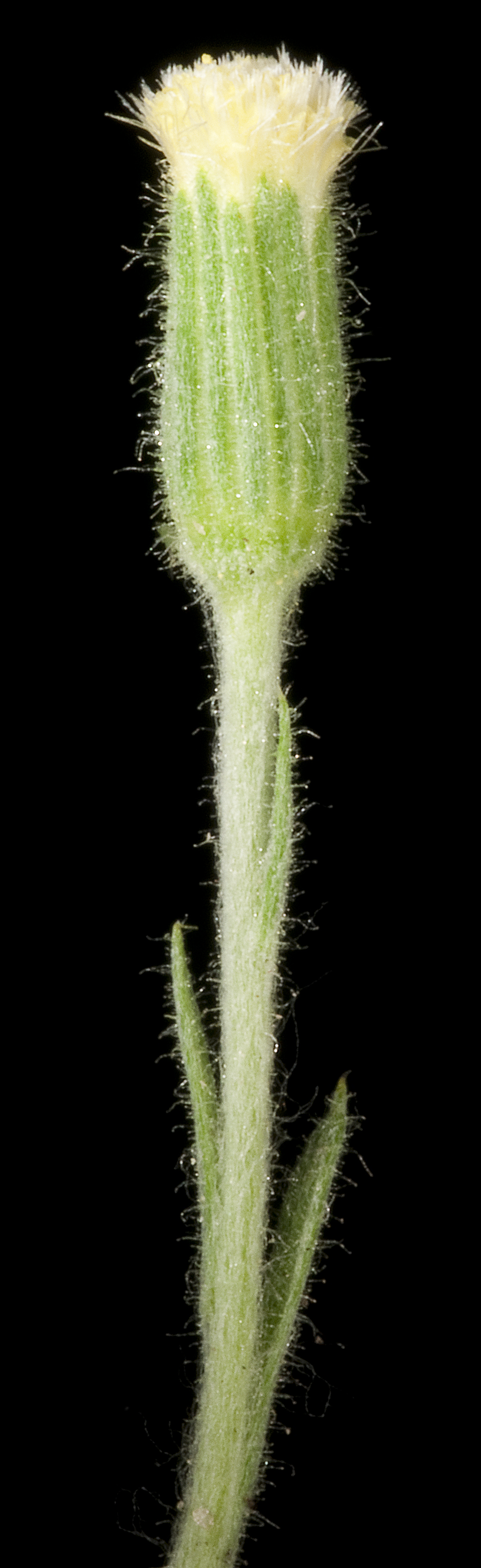

Scientific classification
- Kingdom: Plantae
- Clade: Tracheophytes
- Clade: Angiosperms
- Clade: Eudicots
- Clade: Asterids
- Order: Asterales
- Family: Asteraceae
- Genus: Millotia
- Species: M. tenuifolia

Binomial name
- Millotia tenuifolia Cass.

= Millotia tenuifolia =

Species of plant

Millotia tenuifolia (common name - soft millotia) is a species of small annual herb in the tribe Gnaphalieae within the Asteraceae family, endemic to all states and territories of Australia except Queensland and the Northern Territory.

It was first described in 1829 by Henri Cassini from a specimen collected by d'Urville from King Georges Sound.

== Gallery ==
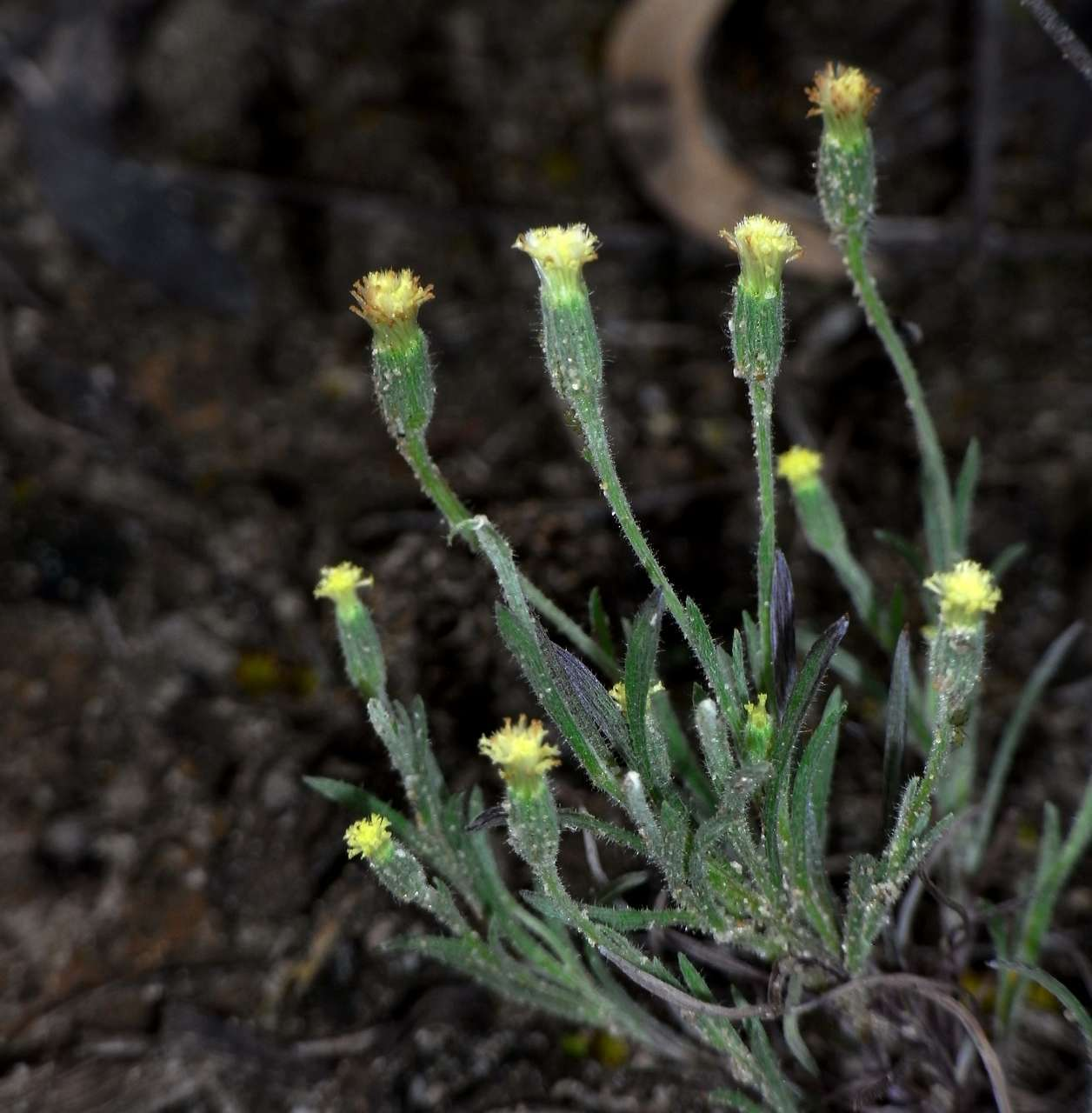

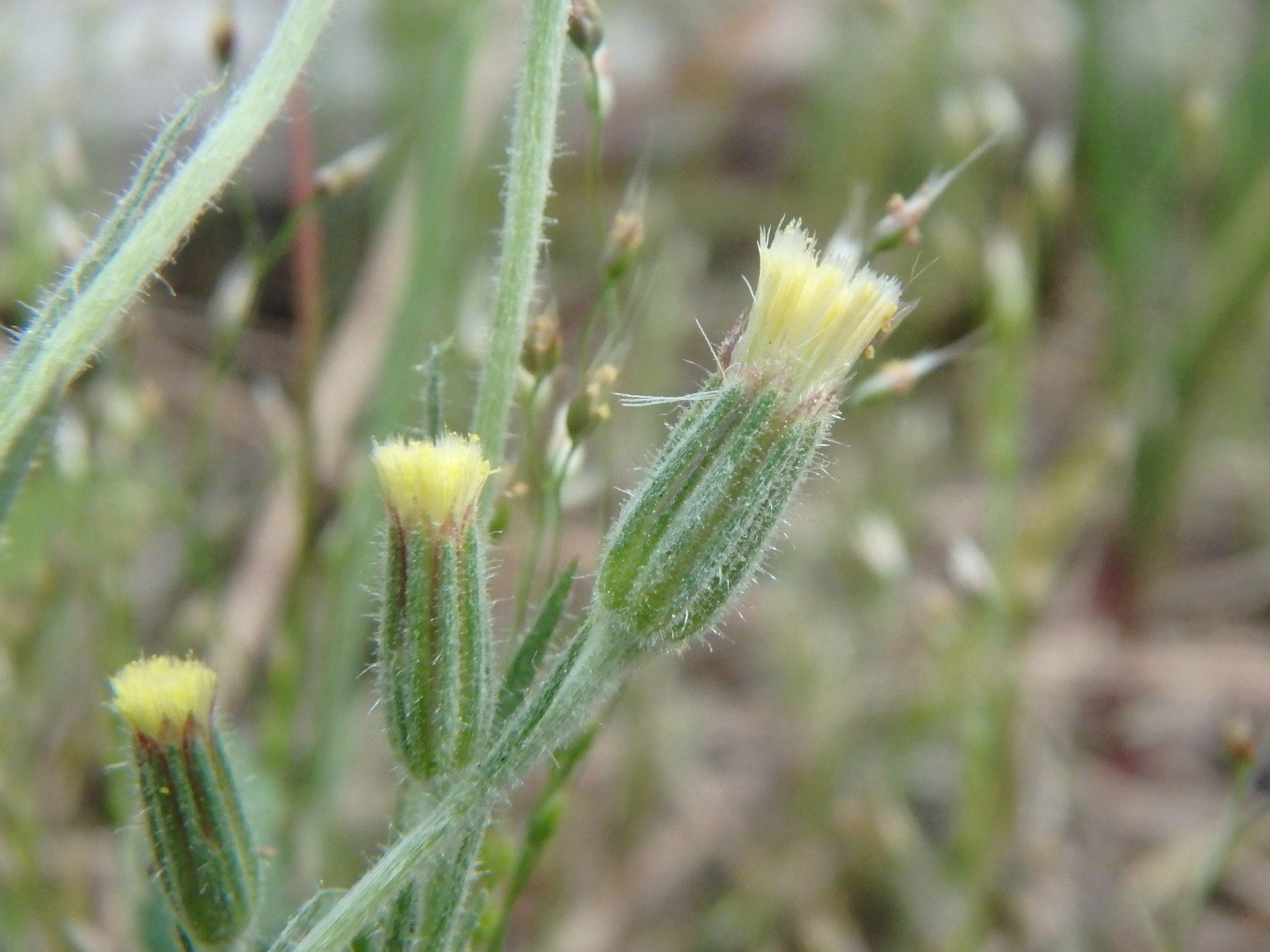

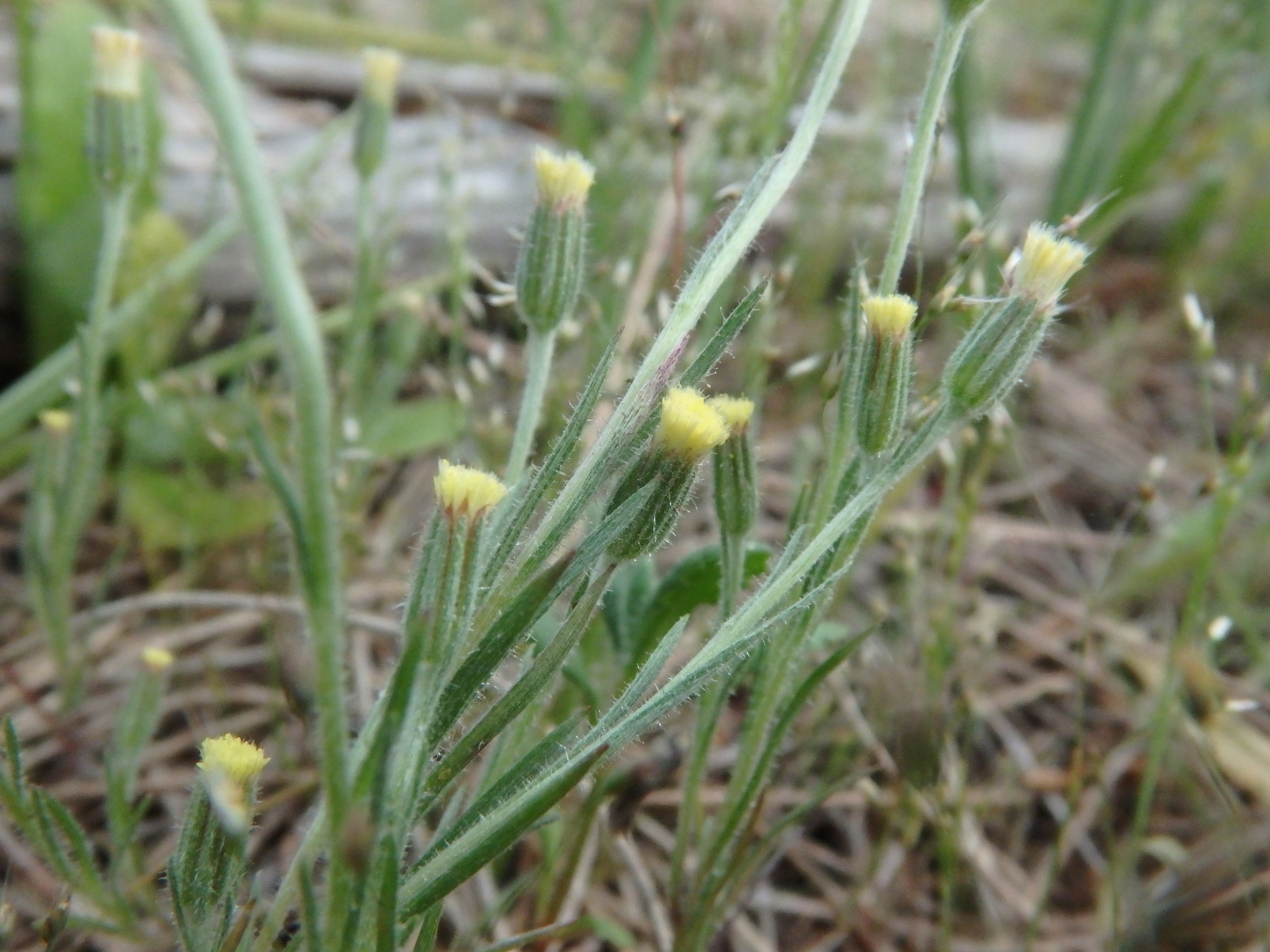
