= Claude-François-Xavier Millot =

French churchman and historian

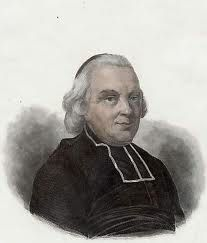
Claude-François-Xavier Millot

Claude-François-Xavier Millot (5 March 1726, Ornans, Doubs – 20 March 1785, Paris) was a French churchman and historian.

== Biography ==
Whilst still young Millot entered the Jesuit order, teaching in many of their collèges, such as that at Lyon where he taught rhetoric. Expelled for praising Montesquieu, he left the Jesuits. Made grand-vicar by the archbishop of Lyon, Millot wrote historical accounts and in 1768 received a chair in history at the collège de la Noblesse, founded at Parma by the marquis of Felino. Received into the Académie Française in 1777, he was made preceptor to the duc d'Enghien in 1778.

Millotia, a genus of small annual herbs, is named in honour of Millot.

== Works ==
- Éléments de l'histoire de France, depuis Clovis jusqu'à Louis XV (1767–1769)
- Élémens de l'histoire d'Angleterre, depuis son origine sous les Romains, jusqu'au regne de George II. Paris, Durand, 1769. Trois volumes in-12, t. I : [3 (faux-titre, mention d'éditeur, titre)], [1 bl.], LI, [1 bl. (introduction, table)], 454, [3 (approbation, privilège, errata)], [3 bl.], [1 (suite du privilège)], [1 bl.] p., t. II : [3 (faux-titre, mention d'éditeur, titre)], [1 bl.], XII, 480, [1 (errata)], [1 bl.] p., t. III : [1 (faux-titre)], [1 bl.], [1 (titre)], [1 bl.], XII, 352, [1 (errata)], [1 bl.] p.
- Éléments d'histoire générale ancienne et moderne (1772–1783)
- Histoire littéraire des Troubadours (1774)
- Mémoires politiques et militaires pour servir à l'histoire de Louis XIV et de Louis XV (1777)
