= Philomatic society =

Association of persons who love sciences

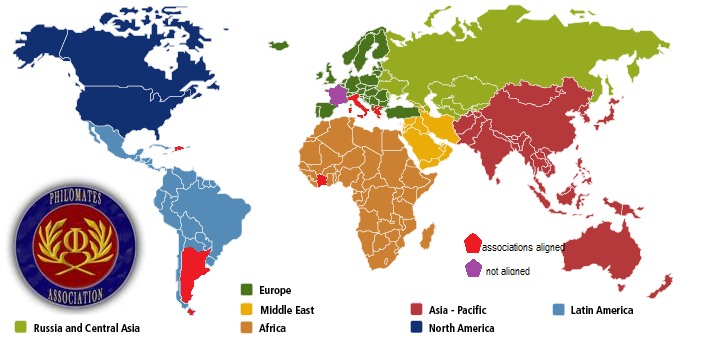
Spread worldwide of philomat's

A philomatic society is an association of persons who love sciences. The term "philomatic" (in French, philomathique) is no longer in use. The philomatic societies were influential in the nineteenth century. The most remarkable was the Philomatic Society of Paris (Société Philomathique de Paris).

== Société Philomathique de Paris ==
This Society was created on 10 December 1788 by Augustin-François de Silvestre, Alexandre Brongniart, Audirac, de Broval, Alexis Thérèse Petit and Riche. It was defined by J.-André Thomas, one of its members, as:

"La Société Philomathique de Paris est une société scientifique et philosophique pluridisciplinaire, de haut niveau. On en devient membre par cooptation, puis par vote de substitution, car le nombre de ses adhérents est limité. Elle est républicaine, non secrète, entièrement ouverte à la connaissance, farouchement indépendante; elle cultive l'authenticité, la tolérance, la liberté."

"The Philomatic Society of Paris is a high-level multidisciplinary scientific and philosophical society. One becomes a member by co-option, then by substitution vote as the number of members is limited. The Society is republican, non-secret, and fully open to knowledge, fiercely independent; it promotes authenticity, tolerance and freedom."

Many great scientists belonged to the Société: Lavoisier, Laplace, Lacroix, Cuvier, Gay-Lussac, Ampère, Cauchy, Fresnel, Pasteur, Becquerel, De Broglie. Since 1944, the Société has had several Nobel Prizes awarded to scientists among its members, and has, today: Françoise Barré-Sinoussi, Emmanuelle Charpentier, Claude Cohen-Tannoudji, Jean-Marie Lehn, Michel Mayor, and Gérard Mourou, as well as two Fields Medals: Cédric Villani and Hugo Duminil-Copin. It also has had seventeen emeritus members (including Dirac, Heisenberg, Morgan, and Planck).

The Société still exists, although it is less influential, partly due to lack of funds.

== French provinces ==
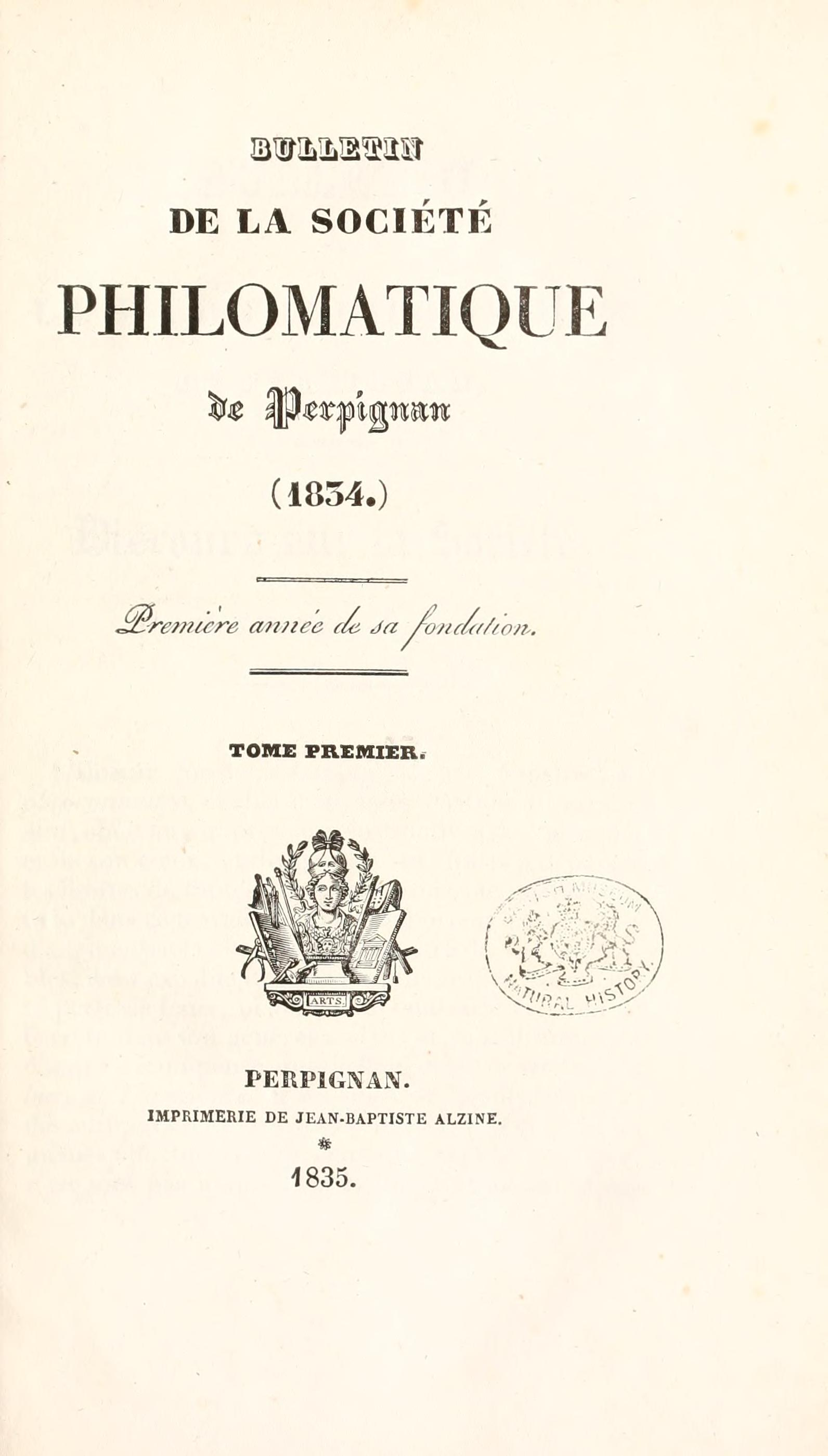
Le Bulletin de la Société Philomathique de Perpignan

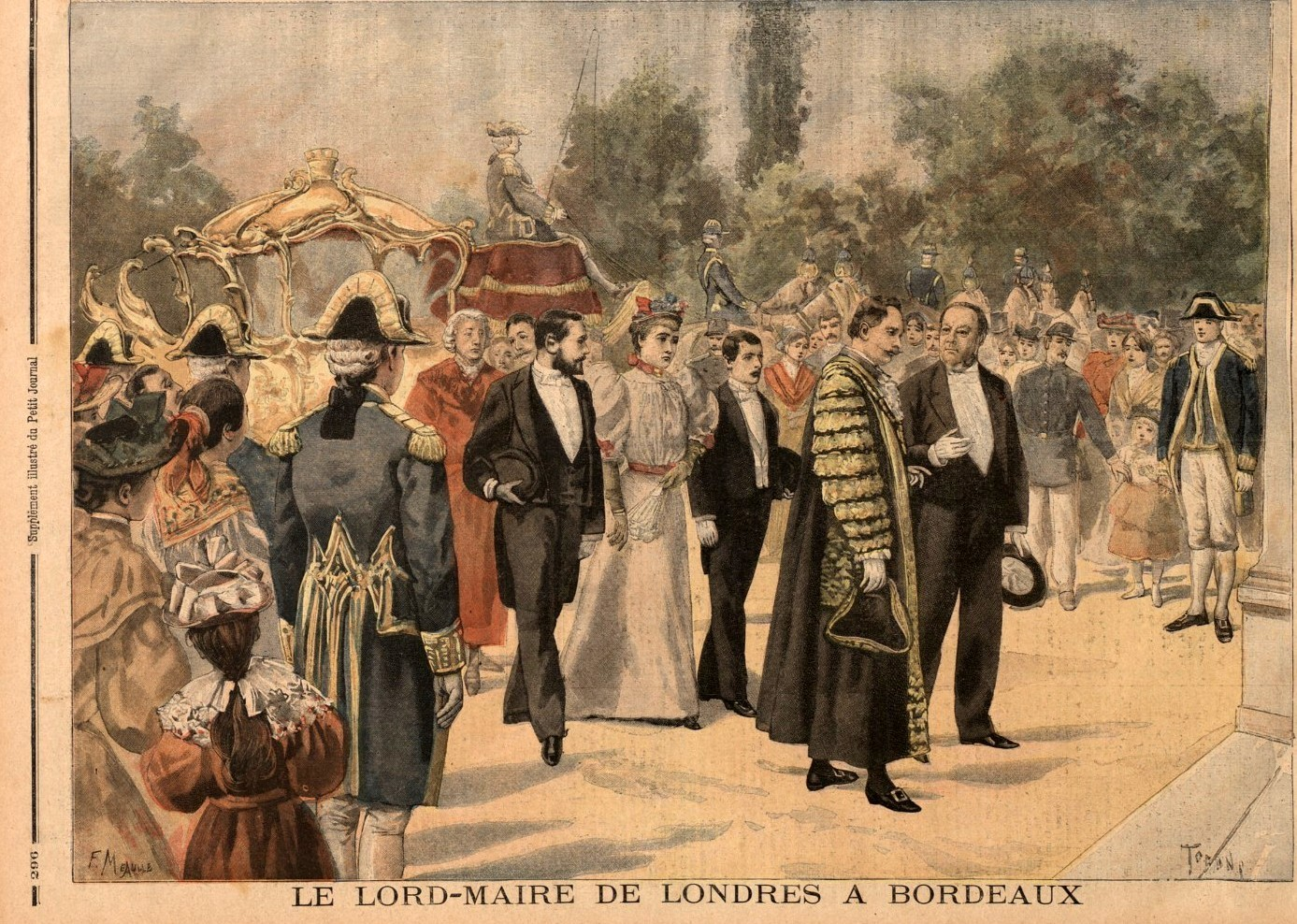
The Exposition de Bordeaux, 1895

Another society based in Saint-Dié (Vosges) uses the alternative spelling 'philomatique'. The Association philomathique d'Alsace et de Lorraine (Strasbourg) and the Académie philomatique ancienne also existed.

At Bordeaux the Société Philomathique (founded 1808) was responsible for the Exposition de Bordeaux held from May to November 1895 (the 13th exhibition organised by that society). - Publications (available on Gallica)

  - Bulletin de la Société philomathique de Bordeaux, 1856-1897;
  - Bulletin de l'Association des anciens lauréats des classes d'adultes de la Société philomathique de Bordeaux, 1885;
  - Revue philomathique de Bordeaux et du Sud-Ouest, 1897-1939.
- Société philomatique de Perpignan. – Publication: Bulletin de la Société philomathique de Perpignan, 1835-1839, available at Gallica ;
- Société philomathique de Verdun (fondée en 1822). – Publication : Mémoires de la Société philomathique de Verdun : Meuse, 1840-1953, available at Gallica.
- Société philomatique vosgienne (founded 1875).

== Philomathic Literary Society at the University of South Carolina ==
The Philomathic Literary Society is the preeminent oratory and literary society at the University of South Carolina, (Columbia, South Carolina). Also known as ΔAH, the Philomathics were founded in 1805 at South Carolina College. Following the Synapian Convention, the Philomathics disbanded to form the Clariosophic and Euphradian Societies. The Philomathic Society re-convened in 2021 to provide a reformed on-campus home for oratory and literary exercise. The Philomathics operate as a secret society, thus no information is known about its members.

== Philomathic societies in the United Kingdom ==
Philomathic societies in the United Kingdom included that at Liverpool.

== Pará ==
The Philomathic Society of Pará was a Brazilian scientific association, founded on October 6, 1866, in Belém, by the naturalist Domingos Soares Ferreira Penna, dedicated to studying the Natural History of the Amazon. It was the embryo from which the Paraense Museum (now the Goeldi Museum) originated.

== Philomates Association ==
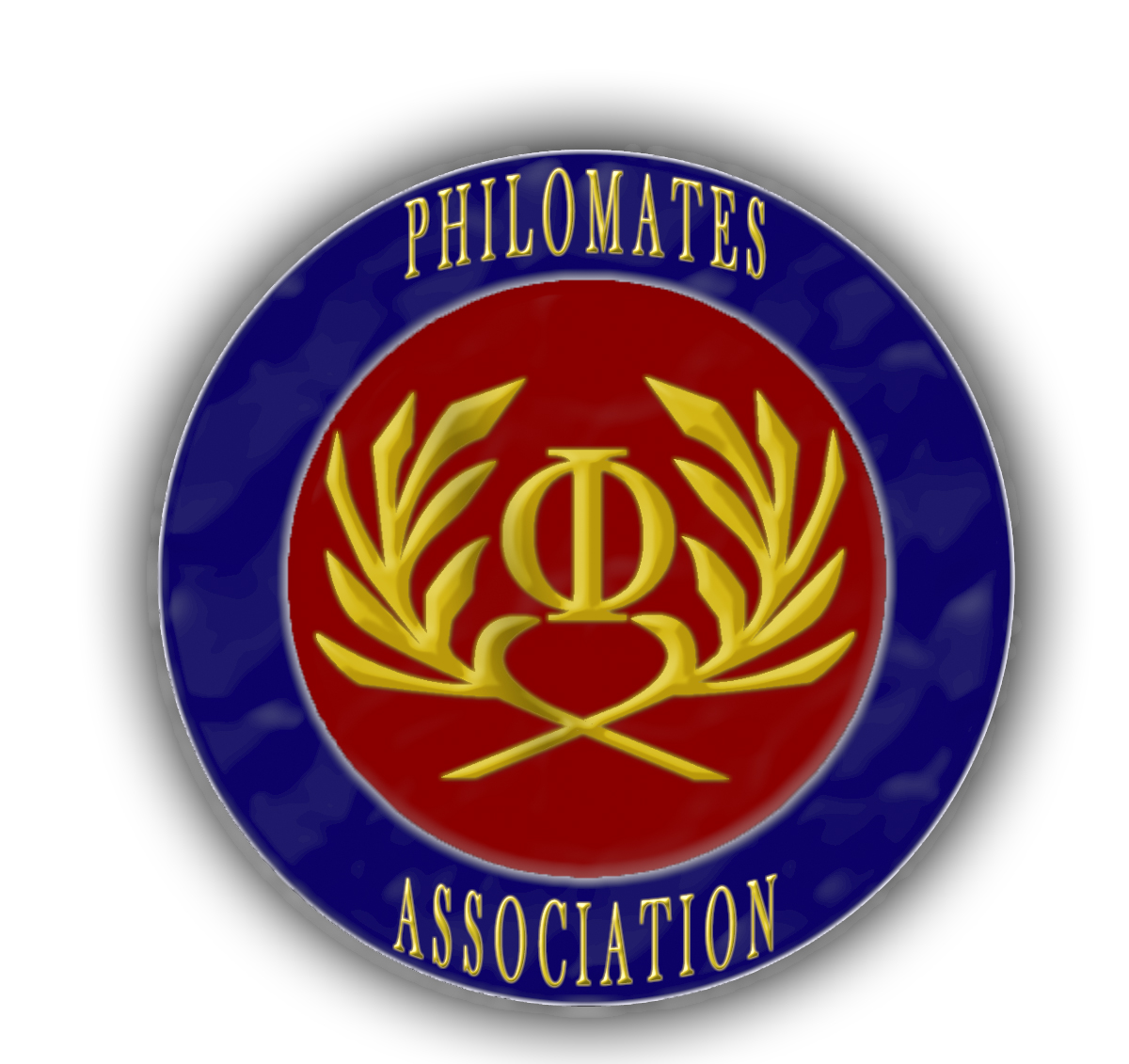

The institution was founded in Lucca, Italy, in 1826, disbanded and founded again in 2005 with the name of Philomates Association (A.F.) The foundation bill was registered in Rome. A.F. rules are collected in the statute and in the internal regulation of the association itself. The Philomates Association, also known as the Philomatich Academy, is the largest philomatic association, with more than 20.000 members worldwide. One of the oldest scientific and philosophical institutions in the world, it has played a prominent role in the history of Western civilisation. It is headed by the technical manager (tetrarch) of Rome, known as First Tetrarch, who has supreme power over the Academy. Its principal doctrines are summarised in the philomatical principles. It promotes research, art and social commitment: their goal is the valorization and the diffusion of culture in every form, through a full collaboration of all members, through their skills and knowledge by using the meritocratic method. Every member, such as manager, artist, freelancer, student, researcher or professor, is engaged in the achievement of the association's projects, depending on personal commitment and technical skills.

On 28 December 2005, thanks to the involvement of qualified members of Italian and foreign economic, political and cultural environments and the main western European countries, it took place some preliminary meetings in order to verify the viability of an association which allowed to deepen and discuss the main topics (such as politic, economic, social) familiar to all knowledge branches: like science, philosophy, economics, history, psychology, medicine and so on. The perception of founders was from its origins that a debate between people of different backgrounds and professional proficiency but with the same level of responsibility, could contribute more effectively to improve the ordinary knowledge of issues by studying and discussing to spot new solutions.

The second point shared by founders and still now essential to the spirit which is at the bottom of the Philomates Association activity is the deep conviction that the fastest way to solve world's problem is based on good international relationships, good multilateral organizations functioning and on the so-called government "intermediate bodies".

The first Philomates Society's meeting was in Rome at the beginning of 2006 and it was established a working plan for the next seven years (indeed this is the length of the presidential term of office). Since then the association carried on its own activity on a seven-year program basis, monitored yearly by the executive council in charge.

Initially the association was made of a narrow number of members, four territorial representatives and three national sections. Afterwards the number increased little by little, taking more and more into account the number of the represented countries.

Several national groups have structures strictly depending on the managing board, according to the local needs. For the groups of the main non-Italian cities it is also expected a national level activity and a secretariat.

The current First Tetrarch, Alexander, was elected on 23 September 2015 by philomatic conclave.
