= Philip Sydney Short =

Australian botanist

- Born: 1955 (age 70–71)
- Education: Flinders University; Ph.D.
- Scientific career
- Fields: Botany
- Thesis: Biosystematic studies in Australian Gnaphallinae (Compositae: Inuleae) (1981)
- Author abbrev. (botany): P.S.Short

Philip Sydney Short (born 1955) is an Australian botanist. From 1991 to 1992, he served as Australian Botanical Liaison Officer at the Royal Botanic Gardens in Kew, London.

The standard author abbreviation P.S.Short is used to indicate this person as the author when citing a botanical name.

== Some published names ==
- Actinobole oldfieldiana P.S.Short, Muelleria 6(1-2): 20 (1985).
- Allittia P.S.Short, Muelleria 20: 54 (2004).
- Angianthus conocephalus (J.M.Black) P.S.Short, Muelleria 5(2): 167 (1983).
- Asteridea morawana P.S.Short, Austral. Syst. Bot. 13(5): 741 (2000)
- Brachyscome gilesii P.S.Short, J. Adelaide Bot. Gard. 28(1): 100 (2014).
- Hullsia argillicola P.S.Short Muelleria 20: 58 (2004)

== Some publications ==
=== Books ===
- Short, P.S. (2003), In pursuit of plants : experiences of nineteenth and early twentieth century plants collectors, University of Western Australia Press, ISBN 978-1-876268-98-5
- Short, P.S.; Dixon, D.; Osterkamp Madsen, M., 1950- (2003), A review of the ferns and fern allies of the Northern Territory, Museums & Art Galleries of the Northern Territory
- Short, P.S.; Cowie, I.D. (2010), Flora of the Darwin region. Vol. 1, Dept. of Natural Resources, Environment, the Arts and Sport, ISBN 978-1-921519-93-2
- Short, P.S.; Cowie, I.D. (2010), Flora of the Darwin region. Vol. 1, Dept. of Natural Resources, Environment, the Arts and Sport, ISBN 978-1-921519-93-2
- Australian Systematic Botany Society (1990), Short, P.S. (ed.), History of systematic botany in Australasia : proceedings of a symposium held at the University of Melbourne, 25-27 May 1988, Australian Systematic Botany Society Inc, ISBN 978-0-7316-8463-2

=== Articles ===
- Watanabe, K.; Short, P. S.; Denda, T.; Konishi, N.; Ito, M.; Kosuge, K. (1999). "Chromosome numbers and karyotypes in the Australian Gnaphalieae and Plucheeae (Asteraceae)". Australian Systematic Botany. 12 (6): 781. Bibcode:1999AuSyB..12..781W. doi:10.1071/SB98030. ISSN 1030-1887.
- P.S.Short (1981). "Pollen-ovule ratios, breeding systems and distribution patterns of some Australian Gnaphaliinae (Compositae: Inuleae)" (PDF). Muelleria. 4 (4): 395–417. doi:10.5962/p.184070. ISSN 0077-1813. Wikidata Q103228704.

(incomplete)

== See also ==
- Category:Taxa named by Philip Sydney Short
