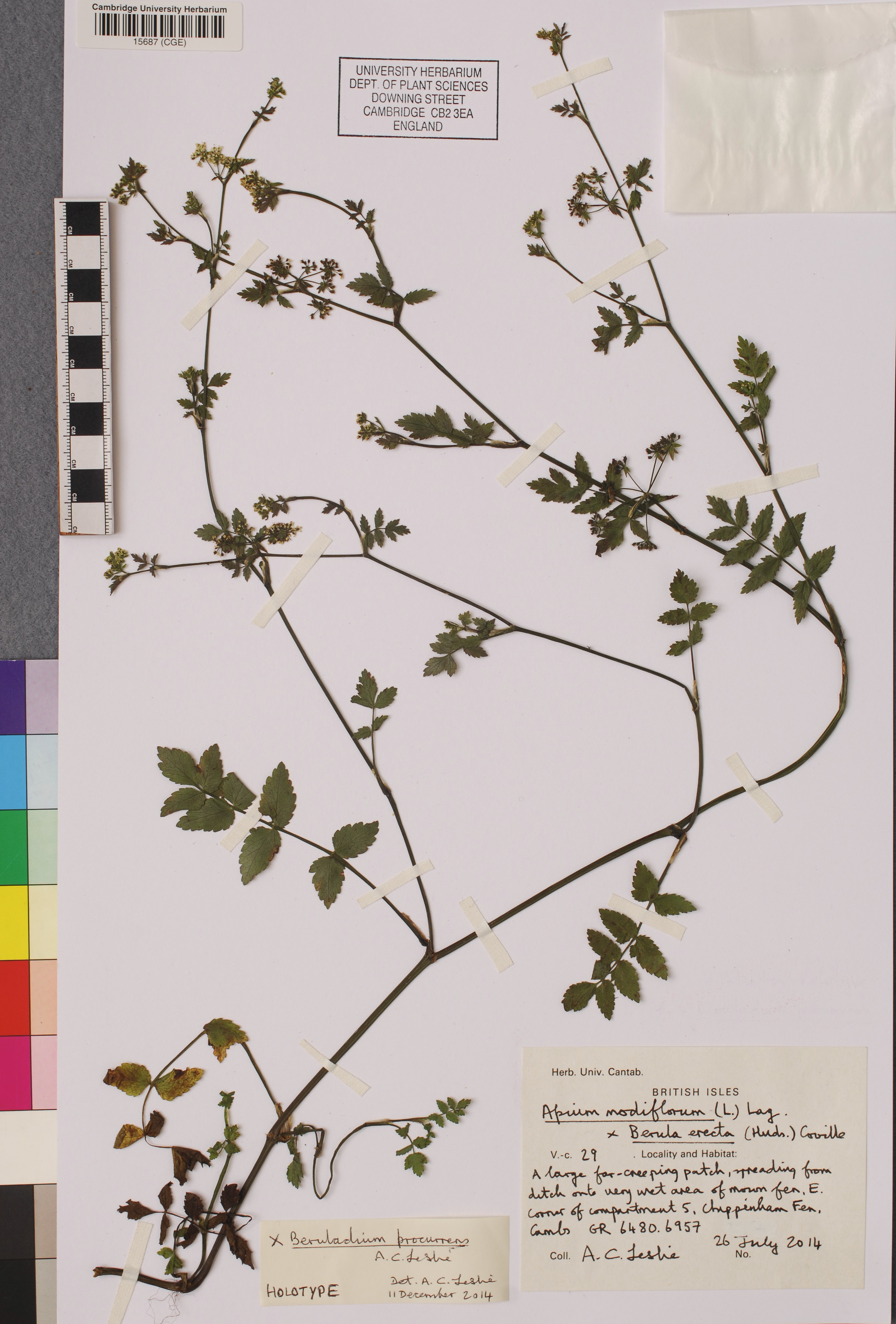

Scientific classification
- Kingdom: Plantae
- Clade: Embryophytes
- Clade: Tracheophytes
- Clade: Spermatophytes
- Clade: Angiosperms
- Clade: Eudicots
- Clade: Asterids
- Order: Apiales
- Family: Apiaceae
- Genus: × Beruladium
- Species: × B. procurrens

Binomial name
- × Beruladium procurrens A.C. Leslie

= × Beruladium procurrens =

Species of plant

× Beruladium procurrens is an intergeneric hybrid plant in the umbellifer family (Apiaceae); the result of hybridisation between Berula erecta (lesser water parsnip) and Helosciadium nodiflorum (fool's water cress).

== Discovery ==
In July 1979 Max Walters collected an unidentified plant from Chippenham Fen, Cambridgeshire, England; it resembled H. nodiflorum, but grew as a floating mass in a fen ditch with small, pedunculate umbels rising above the water surface. Later that year, the specimen was exhibited as a living plant at the annual BSBI exhibition meeting at the British Museum in London. An initial putative determination of H. repens was made, but as the plants were found to produce poor pollen and did not develop ripe fruits a hybrid origin was deemed more likely, possibly H. repens x H. nodiflorum. Later suggestions included a depauperate example of B. erecta, which can be confused with H. nodiflorum in the vegetative state, or else an intergeneric hybrid between the two.

The original material was cultivated for a number of years in Cambridge University Botanic Garden, but this stock is no longer extant, nor was material placed in Cambridge University Herbarium (CGE). However, the original collections made by Walters are present as dried specimens in the University of Leicester Herbarium (LTR), presumably retained after being sent to then herbarium director Tom Tutin for determination.

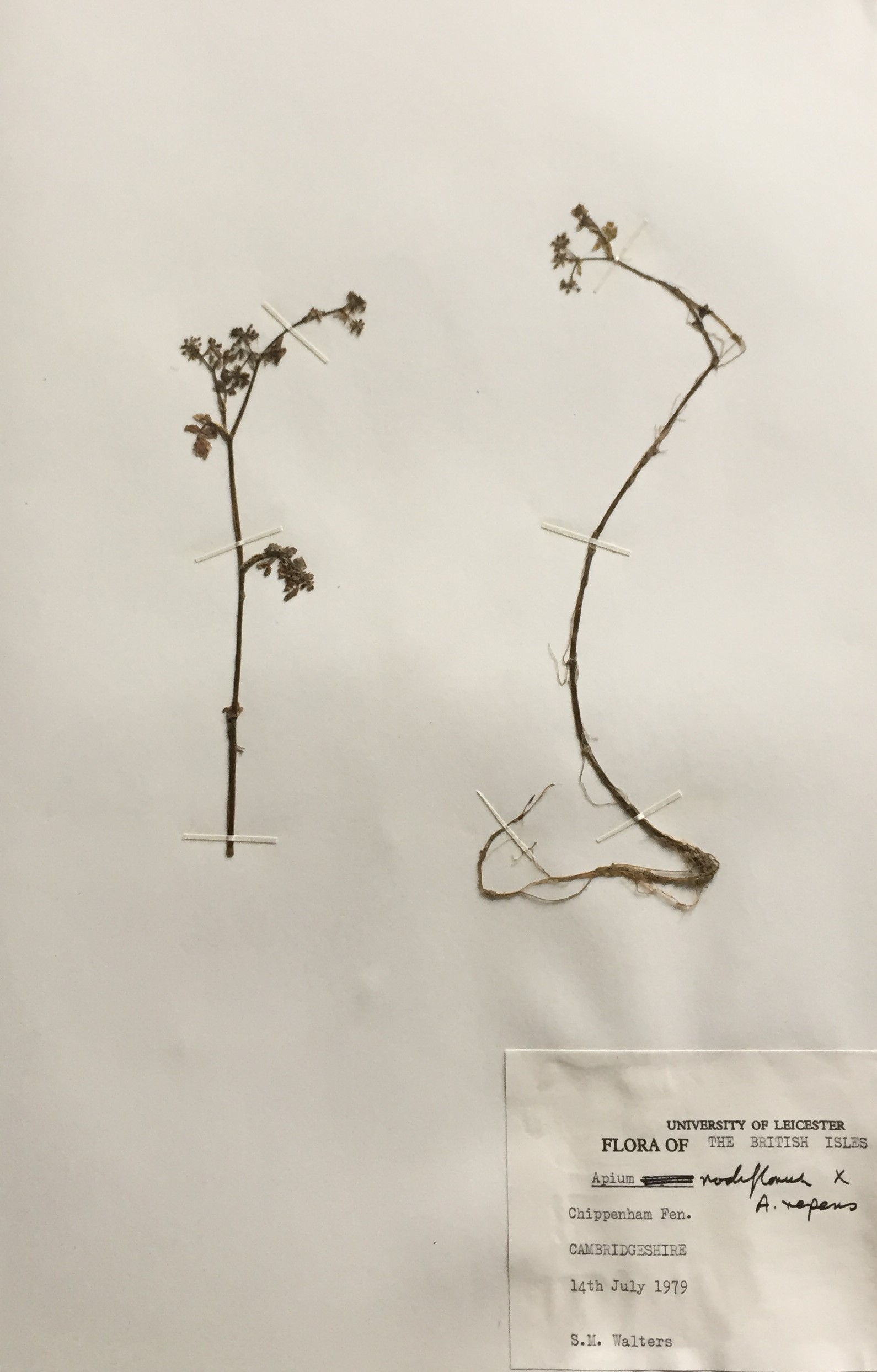
A voucher of one of the original specimens collected by Walters in July, 1979.

Plants considered to be the same as those collected by Walters in 1979 still occur on Chippenham Fen and, in 2014, Alan Leslie reexamined the plants and sent them for molecular and cytogenetic analysis at the University of Leicester, which revealed a previously unknown intergeneric hybrid between B. erecta and H. nodiflorum.

== Chromosome number ==
The original Walters' material and the 2014 collection from Chippenham Fen are both 2n = 20, which is consistent with an intergeneric hybrid between B. erecta (2n = 18) and H. nodiflorum (2n = 22)

== Distribution ==
East Anglia (particularly Cambridgeshire and Suffolk). Notable sites: Chippenham Fen and Carlton Marshes.

== Description ==
Creeping perennial herb that roots at most nodes. Leaves simply pinnate with up to 5 pairs of leaflets, which are ovate to broadly ovate. Petioles without petiolar ring characteristic of B. erecta. Flowering umbels, typically small, are borne on peduncles, which vary from very short to longer than the rays of the umbel, and subtended at the base by an involucre of (1)2-3 bracts. Sterile; ripe fruit absent.
