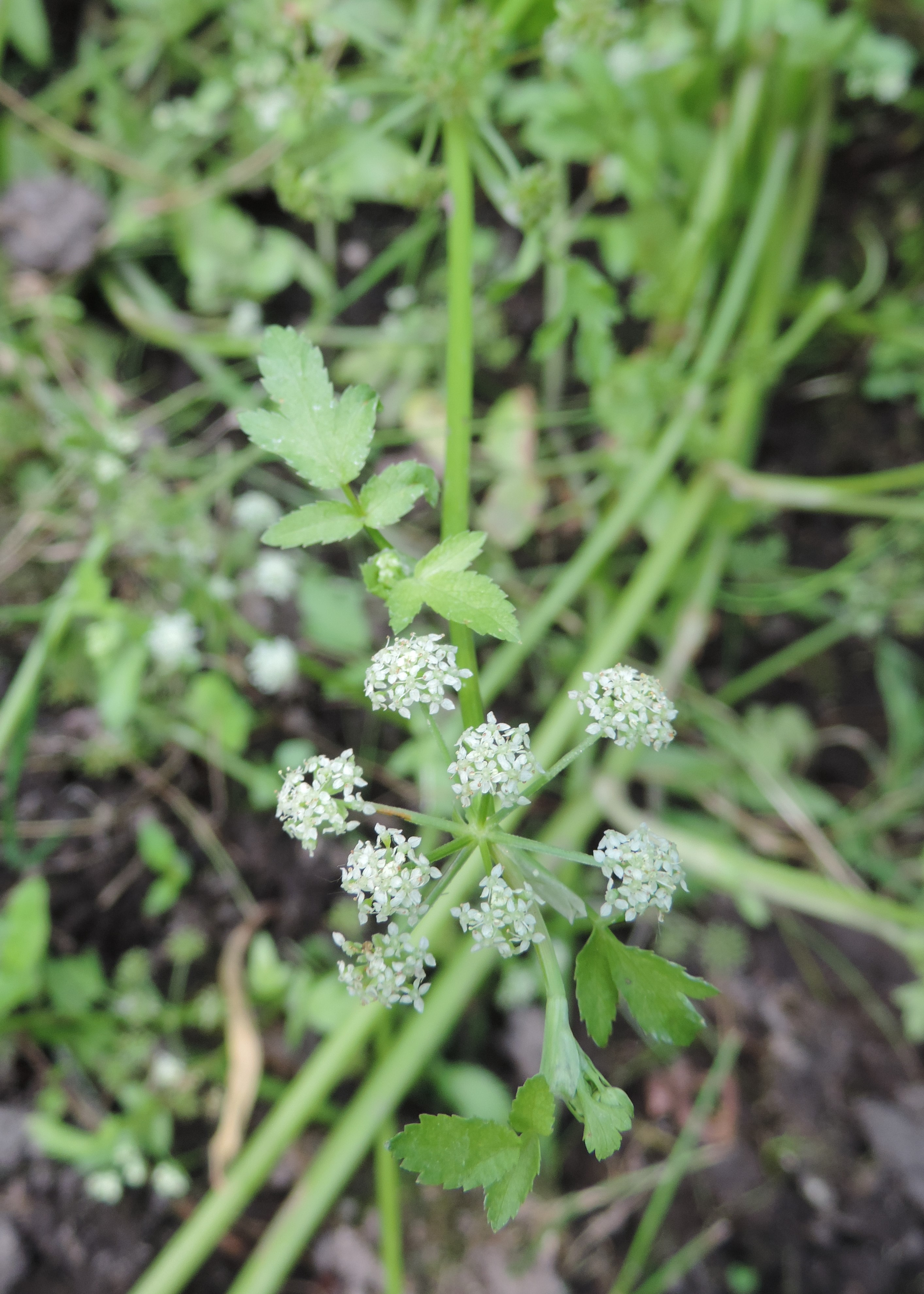

Conservation status
- Least Concern (IUCN 3.1)

Scientific classification
- Kingdom: Plantae
- Clade: Tracheophytes
- Clade: Angiosperms
- Clade: Eudicots
- Clade: Asterids
- Order: Apiales
- Family: Apiaceae
- Genus: Helosciadium
- Species: H. nodiflorum

Binomial name
- Helosciadium nodiflorum Lag.

= Helosciadium nodiflorum =

Fool's-watercress

Species of aquatic plant

Helosciadium nodiflorum (synonym: Apium nodiflorum), fool's watercress, is a flowering plant found in ditches or streams, as well as fresh and brackish-water wetlands native to western Europe. It is not poisonous to humans but it could be easily confused with the allegedly poisonous lesser water parsnip.

== Description ==
Helosciadium nodiflorum is a low-growing or prostrate hairless perennial up to 1 m tall, with a thick, hollow, faintly ridged stem which, when lying down (procumbent) produces roots at the nodes. It has glossy pinnate leaves, each of which has 4-6 opposite pairs of toothed, oval to lanceolate leaflets that are slightly paler green on the undersides. There are ridges at the nodes of the leaflets which are often paler than the rhachis and look like rings. (Note, this is different from lesser water-parsnip, which has a ring on the petiole.) The petioles are hollow with a distinctive single groove on upper surface, and may be streaked with red/purple lines; they are laterally inflated towards the base and clasp the stem. The crushed leaves smell of carrot.

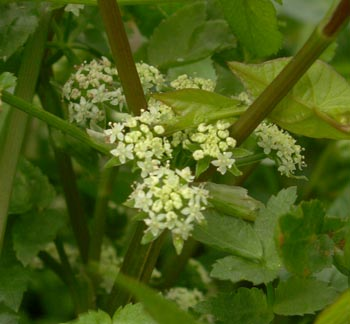
Close up of umbel flowers.

== Taxonomy ==
In 2010 a taxonomic revision demonstrated that the genus Apium was polyphyletic and needed to be split into three genera. Five of the 7 European species of Apium were therefore moved to the genus Helosciadium, as had first been proposed by Wilhelm Koch in 1824. Apium nodiflorum was among them, and is therefore now correctly called Helosciadium nodiflorum W.D.J. Koch.

The genus is noted for the high rate of hybridization between its species, and the following hybrids have been described:

- × Beruladium procurrens A.C. Leslie (Berula erecta × H. nodiflorum)
- Helosciadium × moorei (Syme) Warren (Helosciadium inundatum (L.) W.D.J. Koch × H. nodiflorum)
- Helosciadium × longipedunculatum (F.W. Schultz) Desjardins (Helosciadium repens (Jacq.) W.D.J. Koch × H. nodiflorum)
- Helosciadium × clandestinum Rita, Capó & Cursach (Helosciadium bermejoi (L. Llorens) Popper & M.F. Watson × H. nodiflorum)

== Distribution and habitat ==
Helosciadium nodiflorum is common throughout England, Wales and Ireland but much less so in Scotland. It often grows with watercress in wet places. It blooms in July and August and is found in wet habitats including ditches, springs, fens and ponds. The species is also widely documented from brackish estuarine/salt marsh habitats.

== Uses ==
Wild fool's watercress has been traditionally harvested and consumed in several Mediterranean countries, including Spain, Italy, Portugal and Morocco The edible young leaves and tender shoots can be used raw in salads, boiled, or used as a condiment in soups and other dishes.
