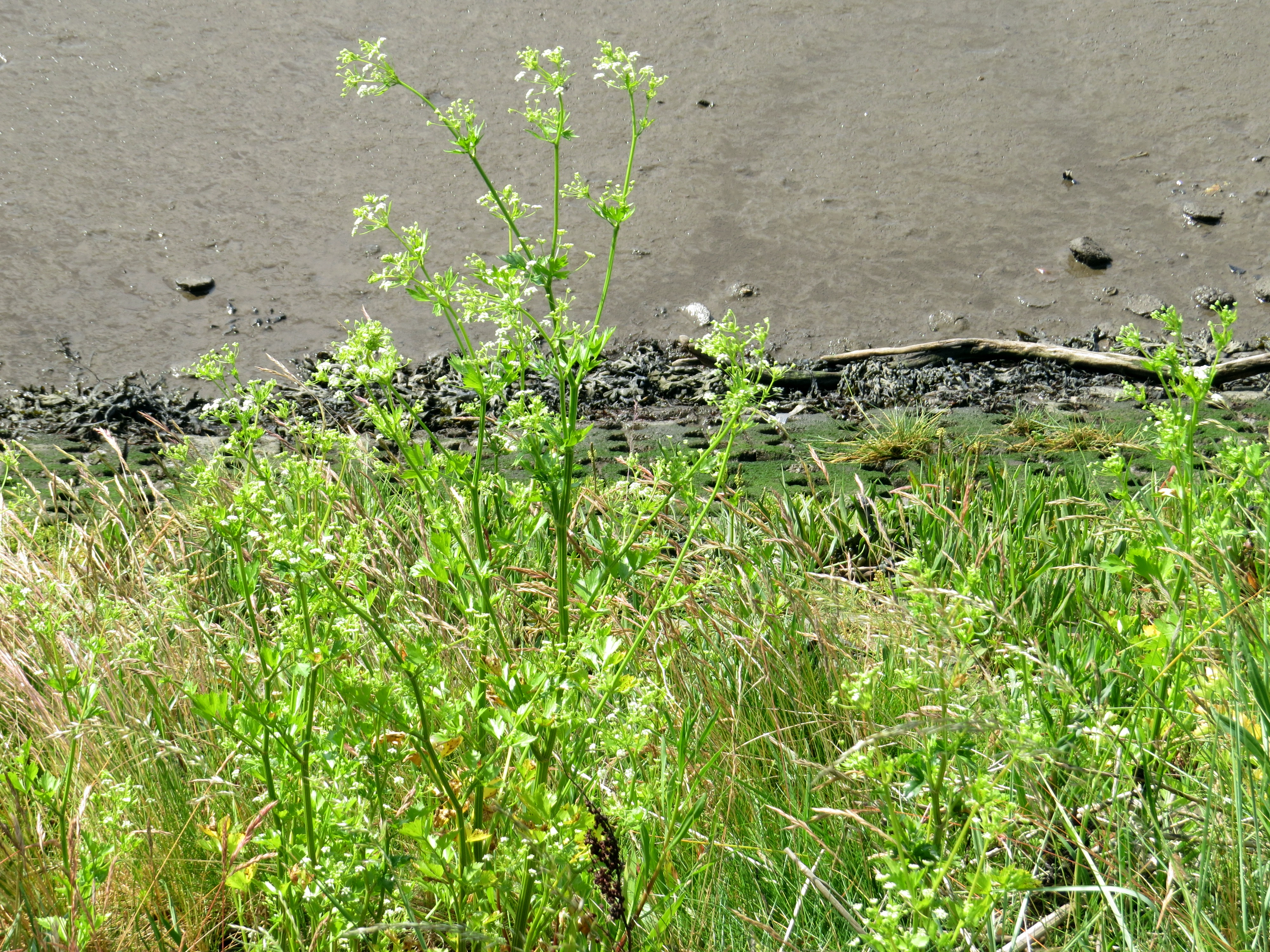
- Apium graveolens

Scientific classification
- Kingdom: Plantae
- Clade: Tracheophytes
- Clade: Angiosperms
- Clade: Eudicots
- Clade: Asterids
- Order: Apiales
- Family: Apiaceae
- Subfamily: Apioideae
- Tribe: Apieae
- Genus: Apium; L.

Species
- See text.

= Apium =

Genus of flowering plants

Apium is a genus, as currently circumscribed by Plants of the World Online, of 12 species of flowering plants in the family Apiaceae, with an unusual highly disjunct distribution with one species in the temperate Northern Hemisphere in the Western Palaearctic (Europe, western Asia, north Africa), and the rest in the temperate Southern Hemisphere in southern Africa, southern South America, Australia, and New Zealand. They are prostrate to medium-tall annual, biennial or perennial herbs growing up to 1 m high in wet soil, often marshes and salt marshes, and have pinnate to bipinnate leaves and small white flowers in compound umbels. Some species are edible, notably Apium graveolens, which is the wild ancestor of the commercially important vegetables celery, celeriac and leaf celery.

The genus is the type genus of the family Apiaceae and the order Apiales; the type species of the genus is Apium graveolens.

== Species ==
As of September 2024, Plants of the World Online accepts the following species:

- Western Palaearctic
  - Apium graveolens L. - wild celery
- Australia
  - Apium annuum P.S.Short
  - Apium insulare P.S.Short - Flinder's Island celery
  - Apium prostratum Labill. ex Vent. (also in New Zealand, southern Africa, and southern South America) - sea celery
- New Zealand
  - Apium prostratum Labill. ex Vent. (also in Australia, southern Africa, and southern South America) - sea celery
- Southern Africa
  - Apium prostratum Labill. ex Vent. (also in Australia, New Zealand, and southern South America) - sea celery
- Southern South America
  - Apium australe Thouars
  - Apium chilense Hook. & Arn.
  - Apium commersonii DC.
  - Apium fernandezianum Johow
  - Apium larranagum M.Hiroe
  - Apium panul (Bertero ex DC.) Reiche
  - Apium prostratum Labill. ex Vent. (also in Australia, New Zealand and southern Africa) - sea celery
  - Apium santiagoensis M.Hiroe
  - Apium sellowianum H.Wolff

=== Former species ===
Species formerly placed in this genus include:

- Apium bermejoi → Helosciadium bermejoi
- Apium inundatum → Helosciadium inundatum - lesser marshwort
- Apium leptophyllum → Cyclospermum leptophyllum - marsh parsley, or fir-leafed celery
- Apium nodiflorum → Helosciadium nodiflorum - fool's-water-cress
- Apium repens → Helosciadium repens - creeping marshwort

== Ecology ==
Apium species, including garden celery, are eaten by the larvae of some Lepidoptera species including angle shades, common swift, Hypercompe icasia, the nutmeg, setaceous Hebrew character and turnip moth.
