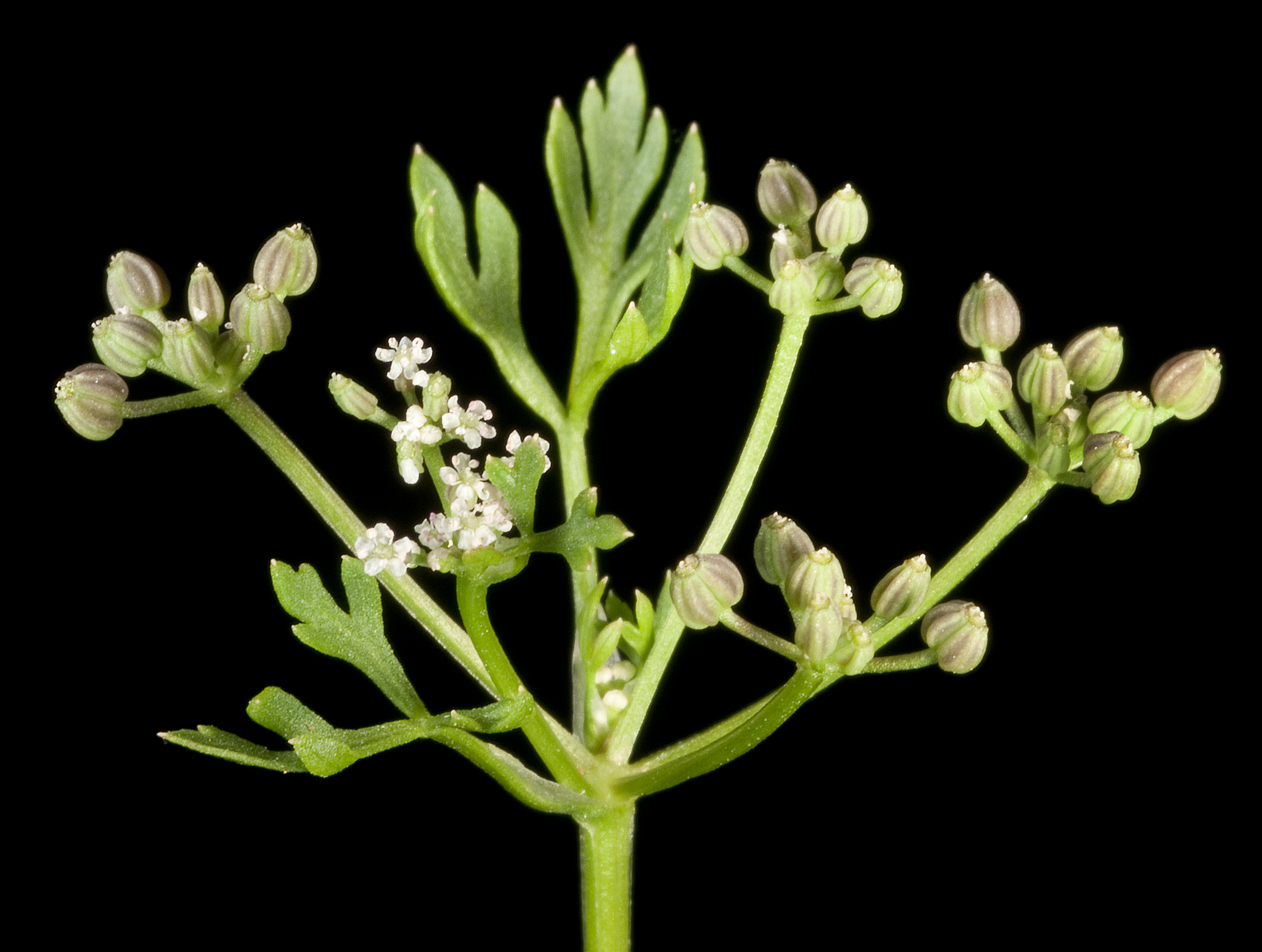

Scientific classification
- Kingdom: Plantae
- Clade: Tracheophytes
- Clade: Angiosperms
- Clade: Eudicots
- Clade: Asterids
- Order: Apiales
- Family: Apiaceae
- Genus: Apium
- Species: A. annuum

Binomial name
- Apium annuum P.S.Short

= Apium annuum =

Species of flowering plant

Apium annuum is one of the 20 species of the genus Apium of the family Apiaceae. It is an annual herb with a distribution in salt-marsh and saline habitats of Victoria, south and western Australia.
