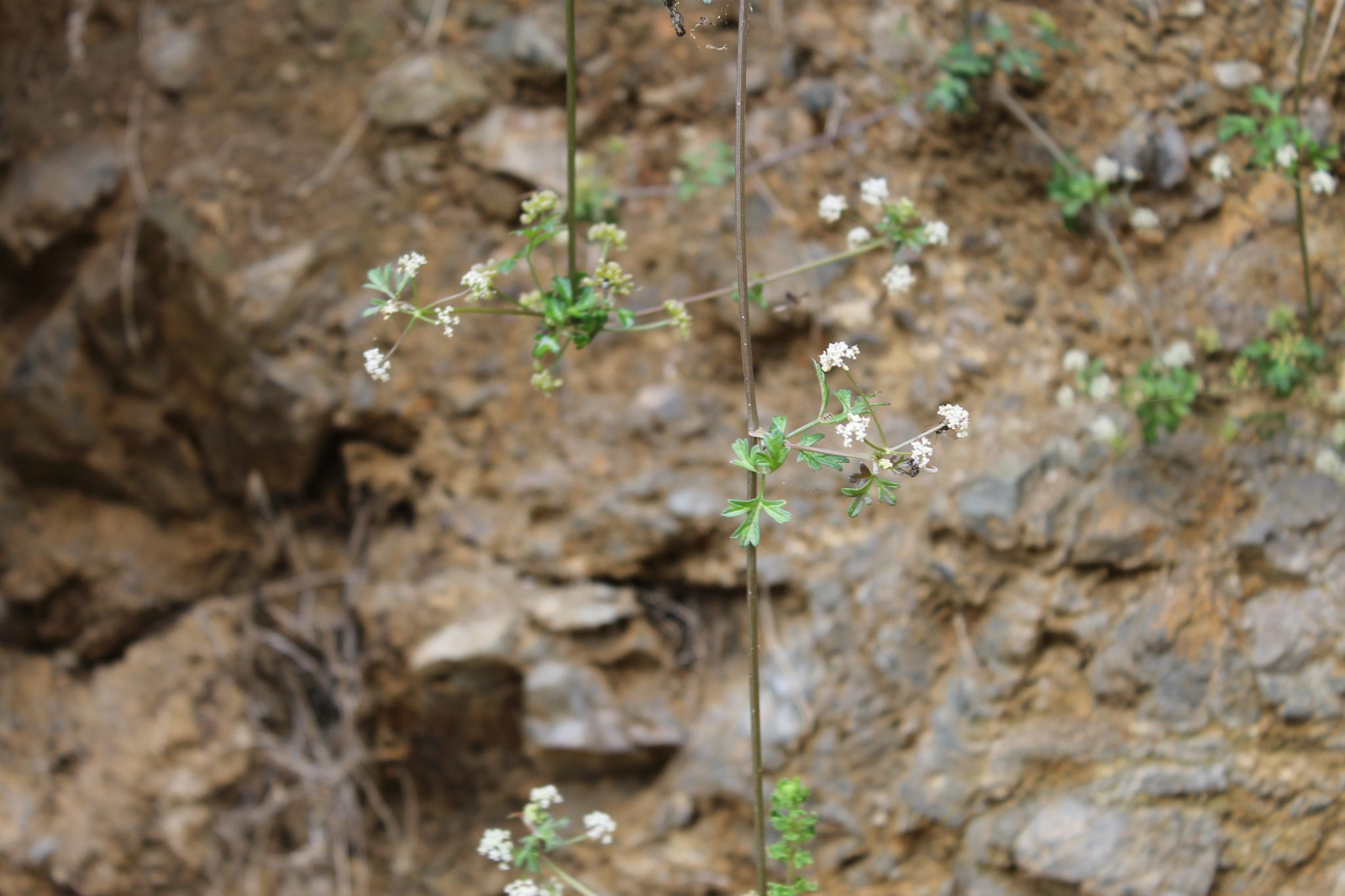

Scientific classification
- Kingdom: Plantae
- Clade: Embryophytes
- Clade: Tracheophytes
- Clade: Spermatophytes
- Clade: Angiosperms
- Clade: Eudicots
- Clade: Asterids
- Order: Apiales
- Family: Apiaceae
- Genus: Apium
- Species: A. chilense

Binomial name
- Apium chilense Hook. & Arn.

Synonyms
- Apium flexuosum Phil. in Linnaea 33: 91 (1864).

= Apium chilense =

Species of flowering plant

Apium chilense is a species of plant in the family Apiaceae. It is native to Northern Chile,Central Chile and Juan Fernández Islands. It grows in the temperate biome.
