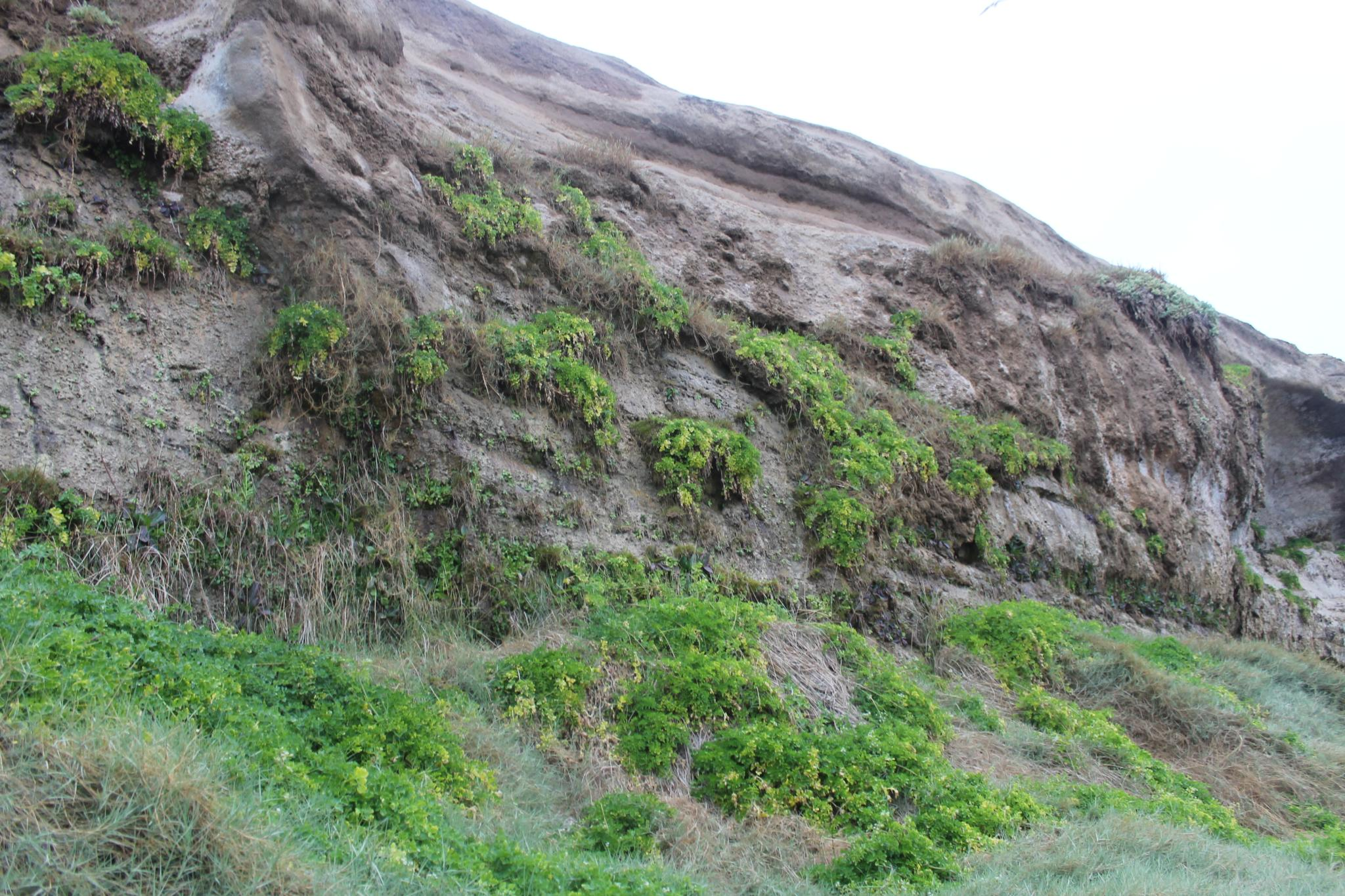

Scientific classification
- Kingdom: Plantae
- Clade: Tracheophytes
- Clade: Angiosperms
- Clade: Eudicots
- Clade: Asterids
- Order: Apiales
- Family: Apiaceae
- Genus: Apium
- Species: A. australe

Binomial name
- Apium australe Thouars

= Apium australe =

Species of flowering plant

Apium australe is a species of the genus Apium of the family Apiaceae. It is a perennial herb with a distribution in salt-marsh and saline habitats of Southern South America.
