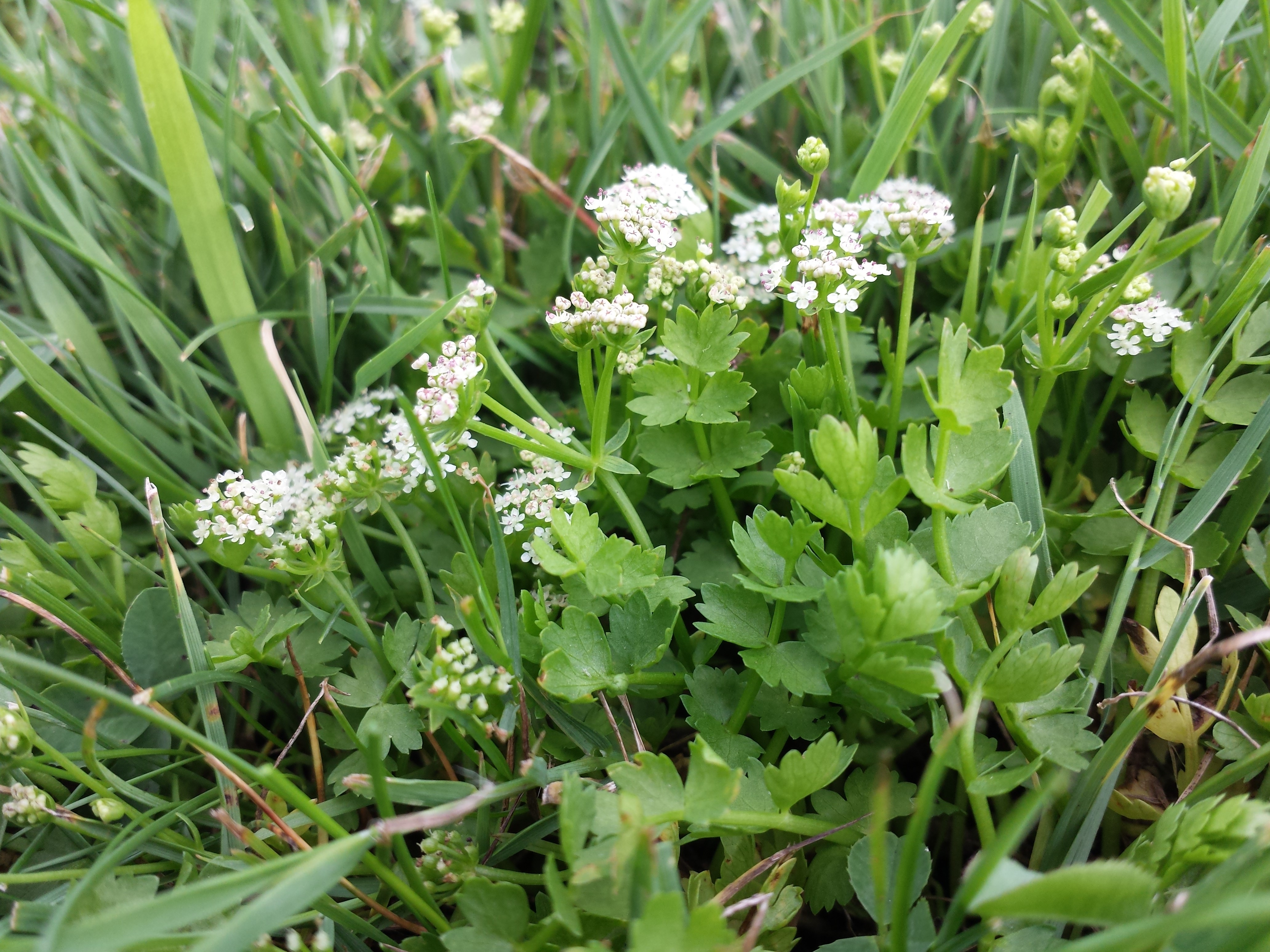

Conservation status
- Near Threatened (IUCN 3.1)

Scientific classification
- Kingdom: Plantae
- Clade: Tracheophytes
- Clade: Angiosperms
- Clade: Eudicots
- Clade: Asterids
- Order: Apiales
- Family: Apiaceae
- Genus: Helosciadium
- Species: H. repens

Binomial name
- Helosciadium repens (Jacq.) Koch
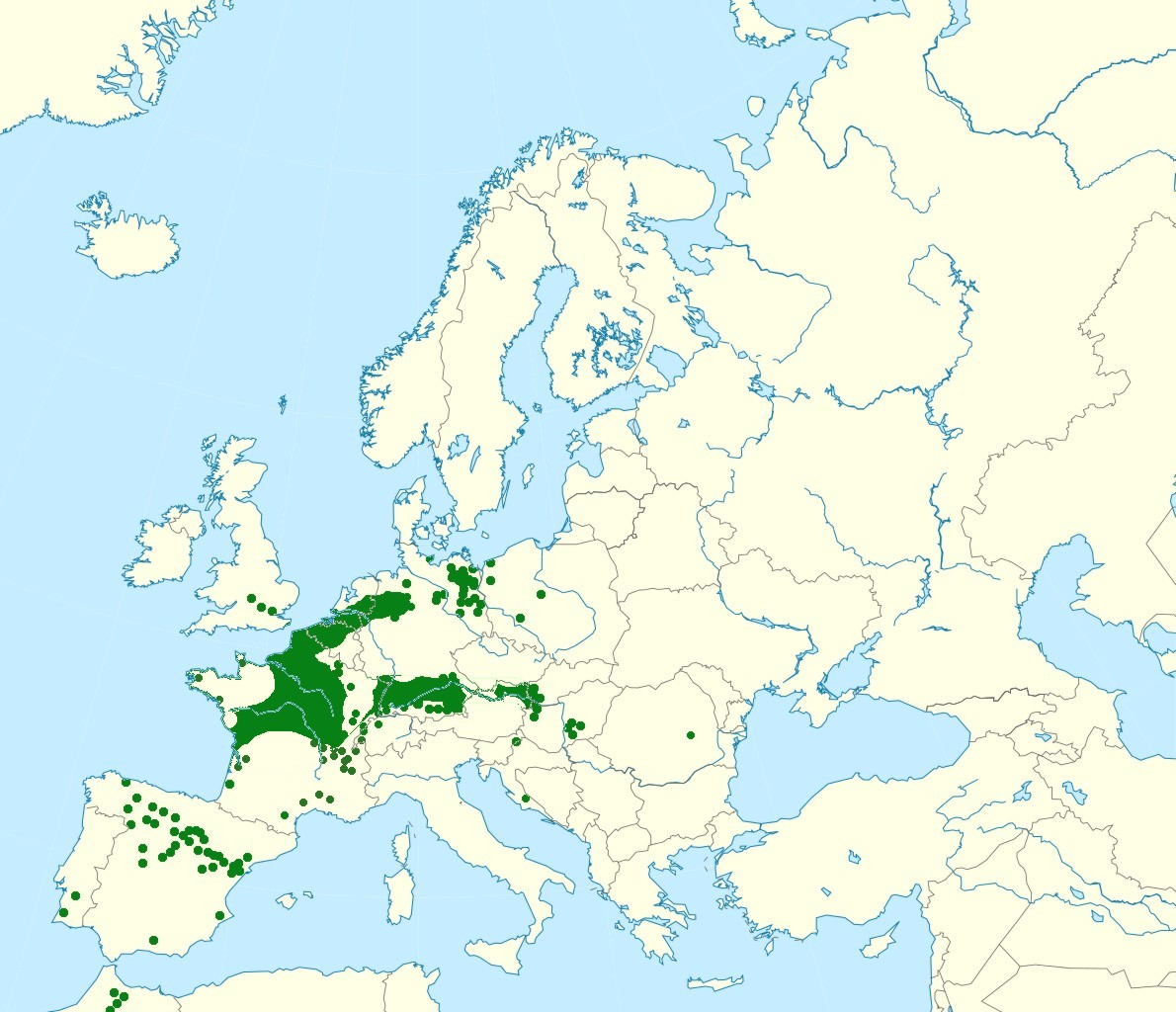

Synonyms
- Apium repens (Jacq.) Lag.

= Helosciadium repens =

Species of flowering plant

Helosciadium repens, commonly known as creeping marshwort, is a species of plant belonging to the Apiaceae family. It occurs in Western and Central Europe, being rare throughout its range. It grows in wetland areas where it does not have to compete with taller plants due to grazing by animals, periodic flooding during the winter-spring seasons, or mowing. It is considered a species of near-threatened status at the continental level, critically endangered and legally protected in Poland. It is subject to protection within the European Natura 2000 network.

== Geographical distribution ==
The creeping marshwort is a subatlantic species. It grows in Western Europe from the Iberian Peninsula to the British Isles and Denmark in the north, as well as Poland, Slovakia, Hungary, Croatia, and Montenegro in the east. Isolated occurrences outside its core range are found in Turkey, Morocco, and the Canary Islands. As a naturalized species, it has been reported from the Czech Republic, North America, and even from the Swartland region in the Western Cape province of South Africa.

Throughout its range, the species is rarely encountered, influenced by both its specific ecological requirements and its poor ability to spread over long distances. In the southern part of its range, it grows in mountainous areas (e.g., in Spain and Morocco, at altitudes above 2,300 metres (7,550 ft) above sea level).

== Morphology ==
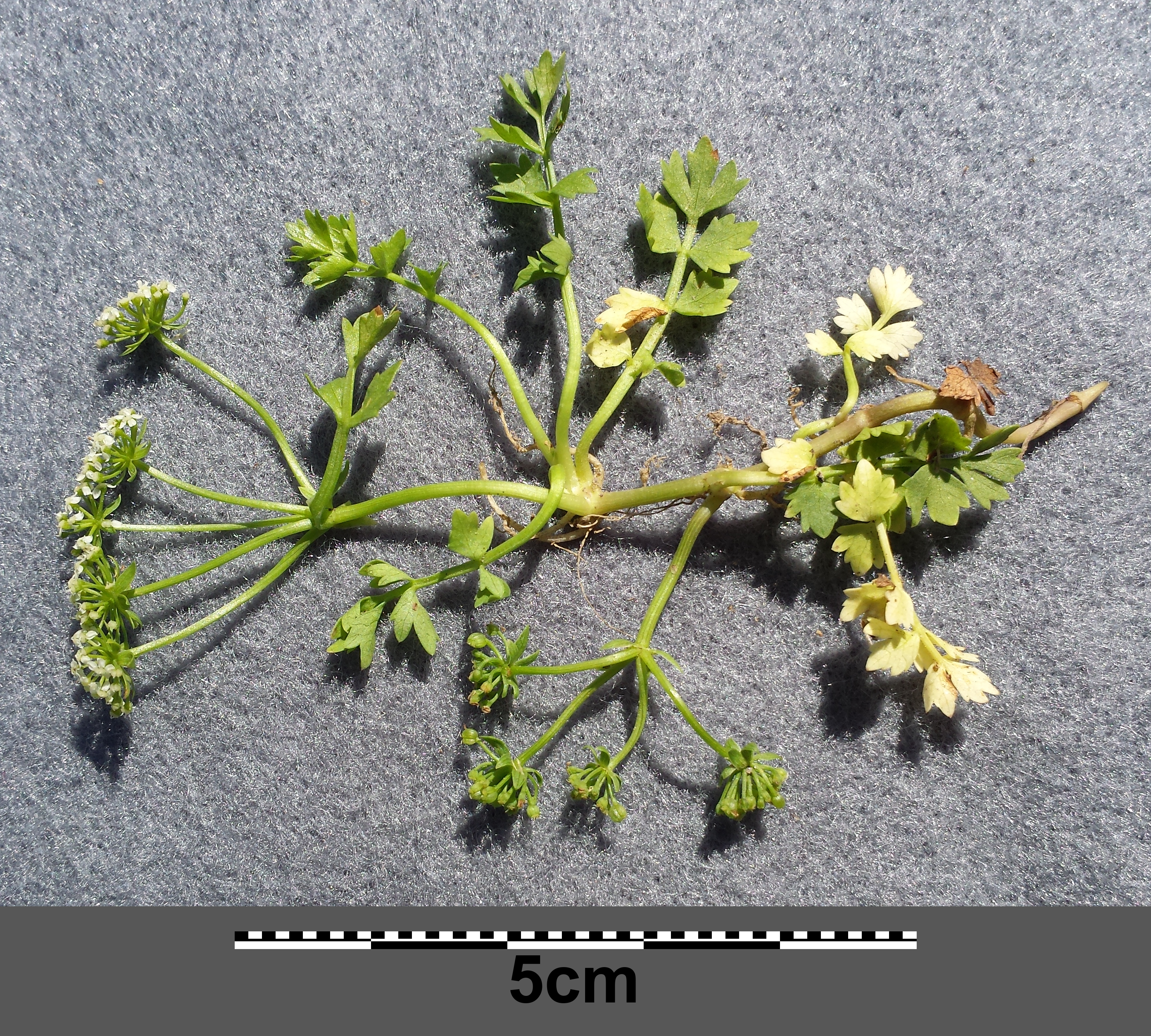
Shoot of creeping marshwort

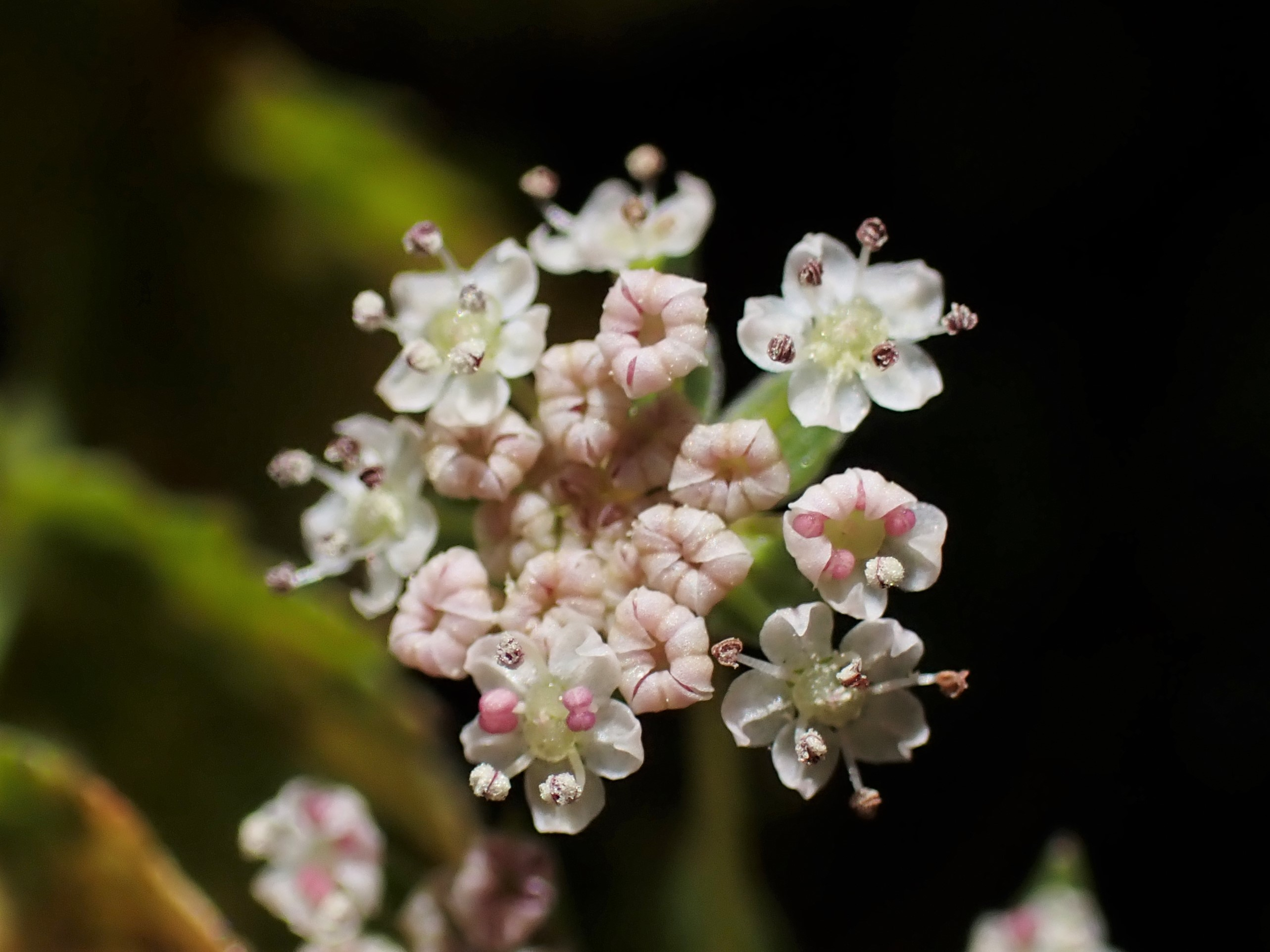
Umbella with flowers

=== Habit ===
The naked, shiny perennial with creeping stolons typically reaches 10–20 cm (3.9–7.9 in) in terrestrial habitats, sometimes up to 50 cm (20 in) or 60 cm (24 in), and when growing in water, even up to 1 m (3.3 ft) or 1.5 m (4.9 ft) in length. In the nodes, the stolons root and develop leaves, which are sometimes absent in the node from which the flower stalk emerges. There are no erect and leafy stems. The roots are filamentous. The stem is light green, smooth, and naked.

=== Leaves ===
They grow from the nodes of the stolons, reaching up to 10 cm (3.9 in), sometimes up to 20 cm (7.9 in) in length (in plants submerged in water, even up to 40 cm), but most often only up to 5 cm in length and 1.5 cm in width. The leaf sheaths are inconspicuous. The leaf blades are attached to long petioles and are individually, odd-pinnately compound. The leaflets, numbering 3–6 pairs, are sessile, ovate to rounded, with unevenly and coarsely toothed margins. They reach up to 1 cm in length. One of the notches between the teeth, especially on the third pair of leaflets from the bottom, is distinctly deeper, which is a significant diagnostic feature distinguishing this species from terrestrial forms of fool's watercress. The leaves are usually yellowish-green, lighter underneath, and naked.

=== Flowers ===
Gathered in umbellules arising from the node of the creeping stem, the umbels, along with their peduncles, reach a height of 1–3.5 cm (0.4–1.4 in), maximum up to 10 cm (3.9 in), sometimes 15 cm (5.9 in). The umbel consists of 2–7 umbellules, each supported by numerous, white-bordered, elliptic, and three-veined bracteoles. The pedicels of the umbellules are usually longer than the pedicels of the flowers, although they may be strongly shortened on heavily grazed pastures. At the base of the umbel peduncle, there are usually 3 to 7 quickly shedding, lanceolate bracts. The flowers are small, with white (sometimes cream or pinkish) corolla petals reaching about 0.5 mm in length, mostly with a pointed and inwardly bent tip. Sepals are absent. There are 5 stamens with white filaments and pale yellow anthers. The pistils are two, bent in two directions. The stigma is small and capitate. The pistils are seated on a stylopodium reaching half their length.

=== Fruits ===
The spherical schizocarps have a length of 1–1.3 mm and a width of 1.1–1.4 mm (the schizocarp is slightly wider than it is long), with persistent styles bent at the apex. The size of the fruits is influenced by the plant's growth conditions – they are larger under optimal conditions. Individual schizocarps are bluntly 5-angled in cross-section with weakly marked ribs. The fruit mass is 0.27 ± 0.04 mg.

=== Similar species ===
The creeping marshwort can be confused with common young specimens of the lesser water-parsnip (Berula erecta) and the great water-parsnip (Sium latifolium), which grow in similar habitats. However, the flowering stems of these species are erect and leafy, with the inflorescences almost sessile (in contrast, the stems of creeping marshwort are always prostrate, and the inflorescences are elevated on stalks several centimeters long). Very similar is the fool's watercress (Helosciadium nodiflorum), which, however, has a maximum of two bracts and shorter stalks of umbels compared to the stalks of umbellules. This species, in its terrestrial form, can coexist with creeping marshwort in meadows and can be almost indistinguishable to such an extent that genetic research is necessary to determine the taxonomic affiliation of the plants. Another similar species, Helosciadium inundatum, lacks bracts altogether, and its leaflets have wedge-shaped bases, not rounded as in creeping marshworts.

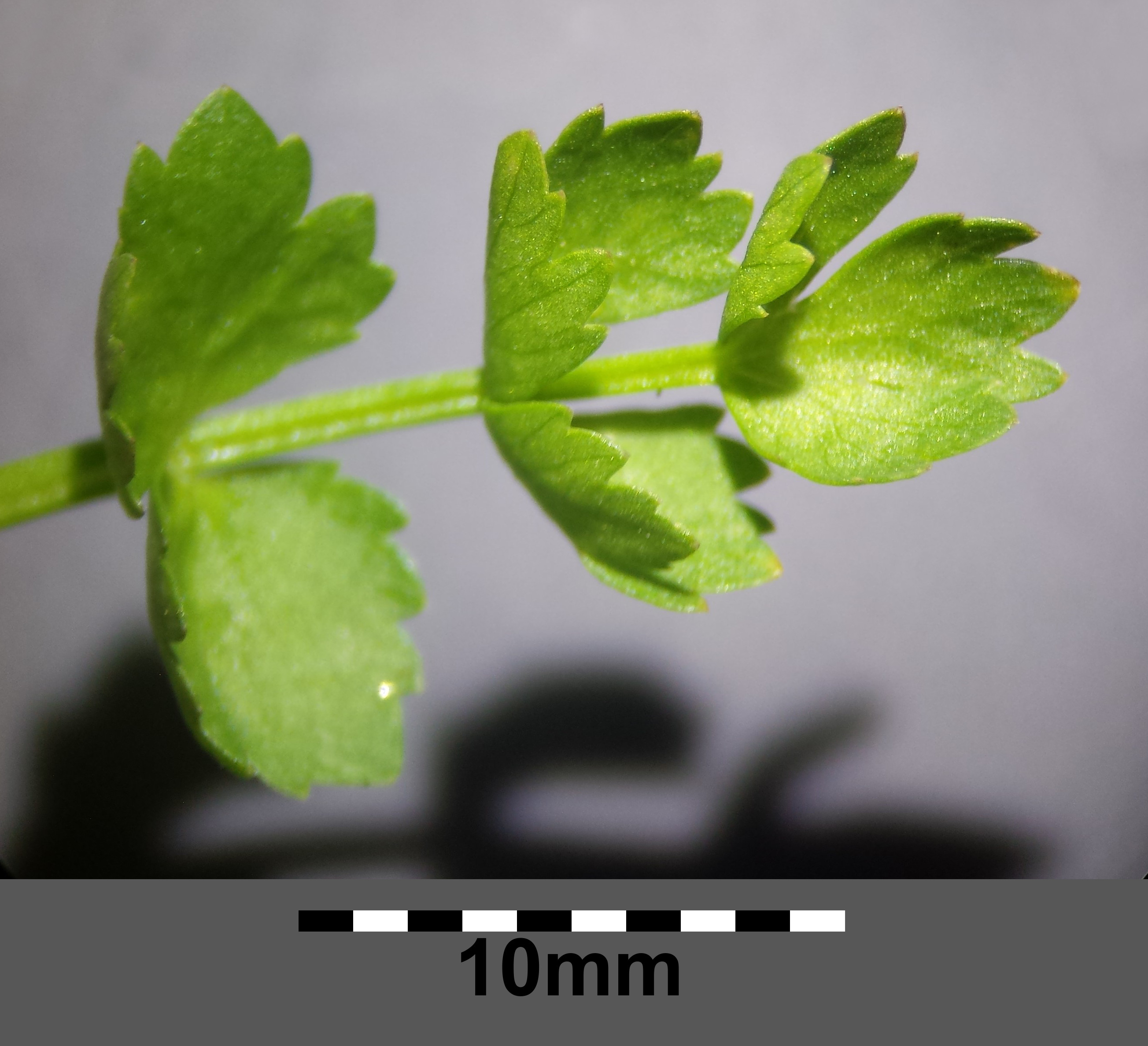
Leaf

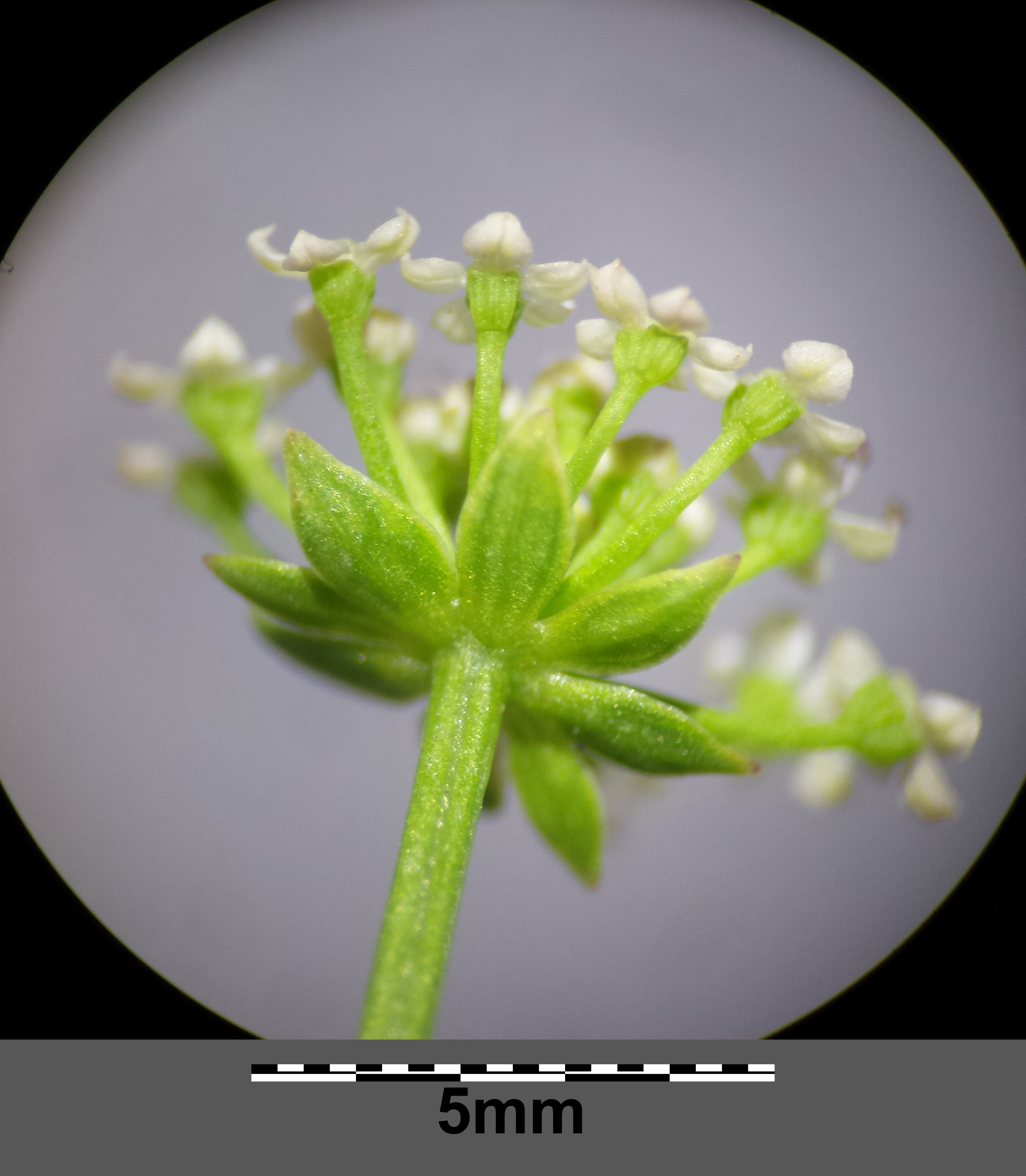
Umbellules

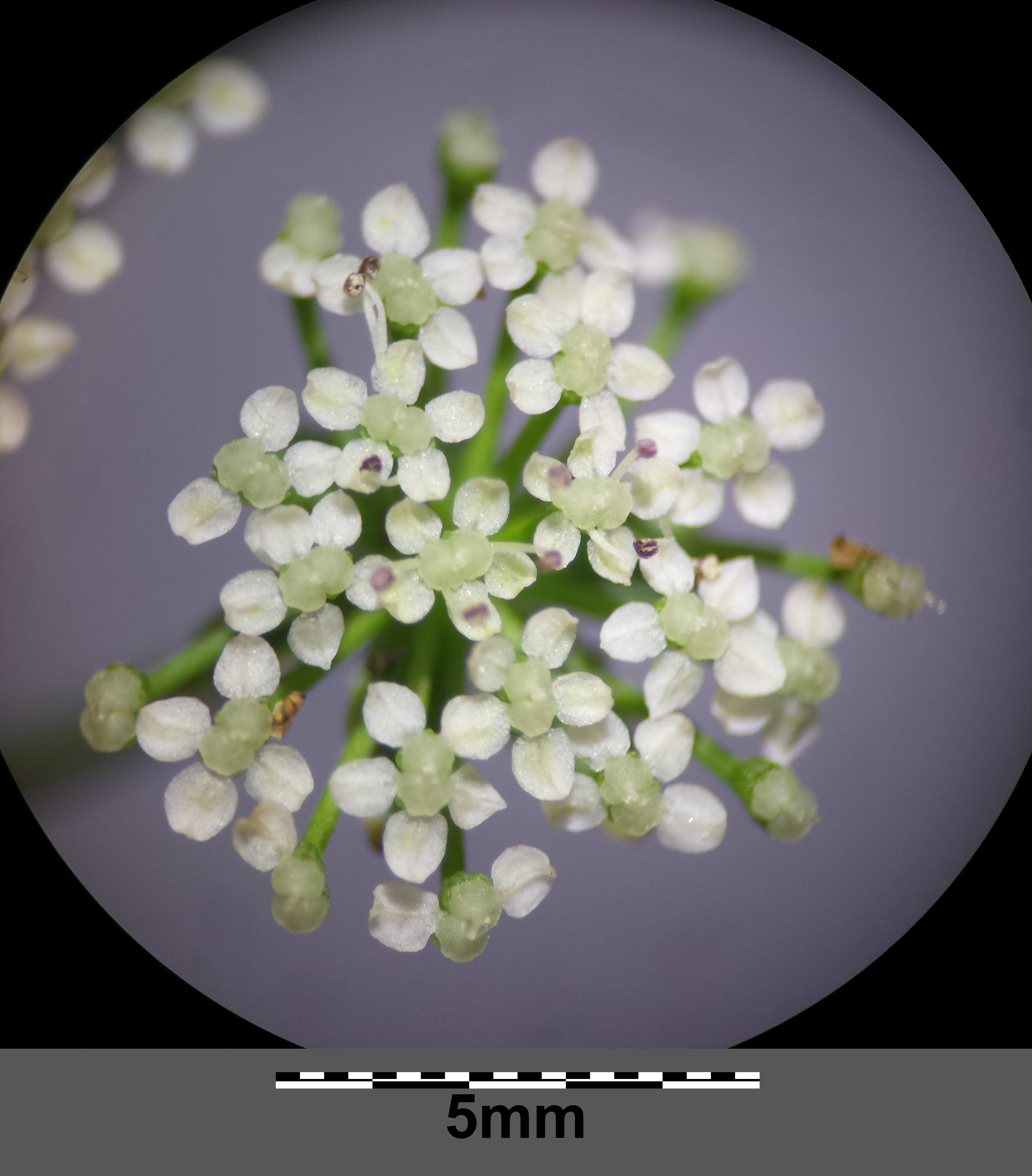
Flowers

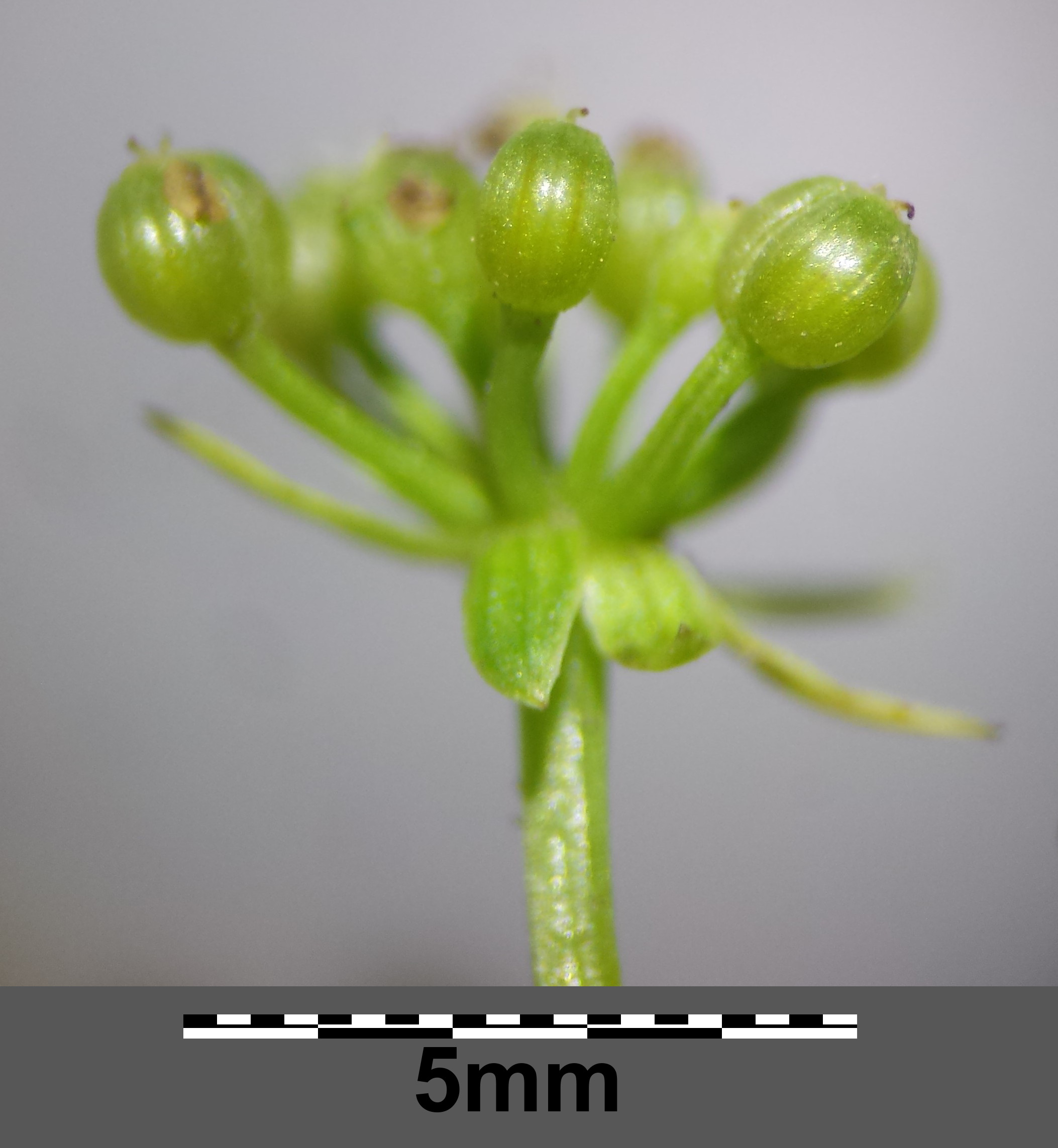
Fruits

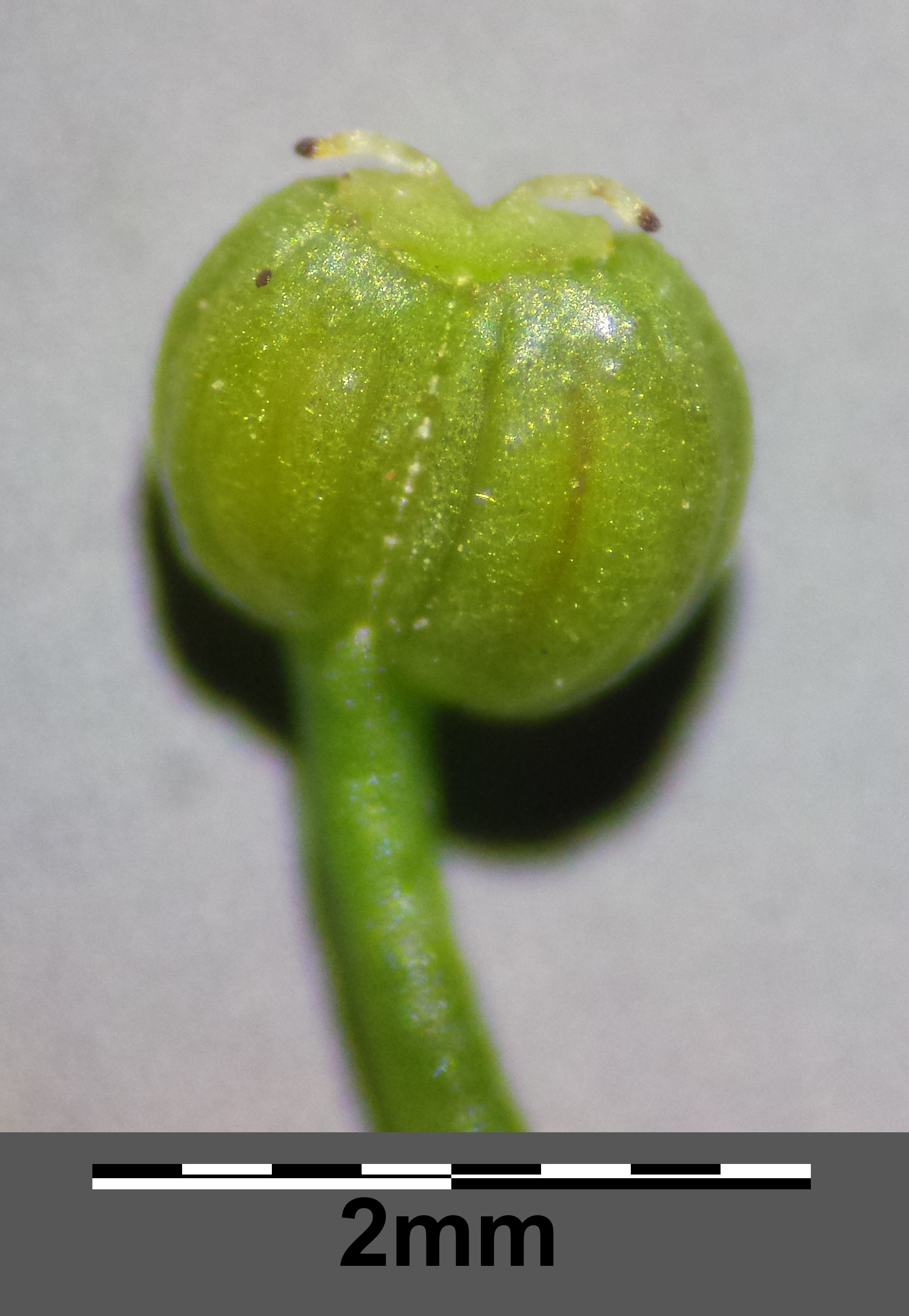
Fruit

== Biology ==
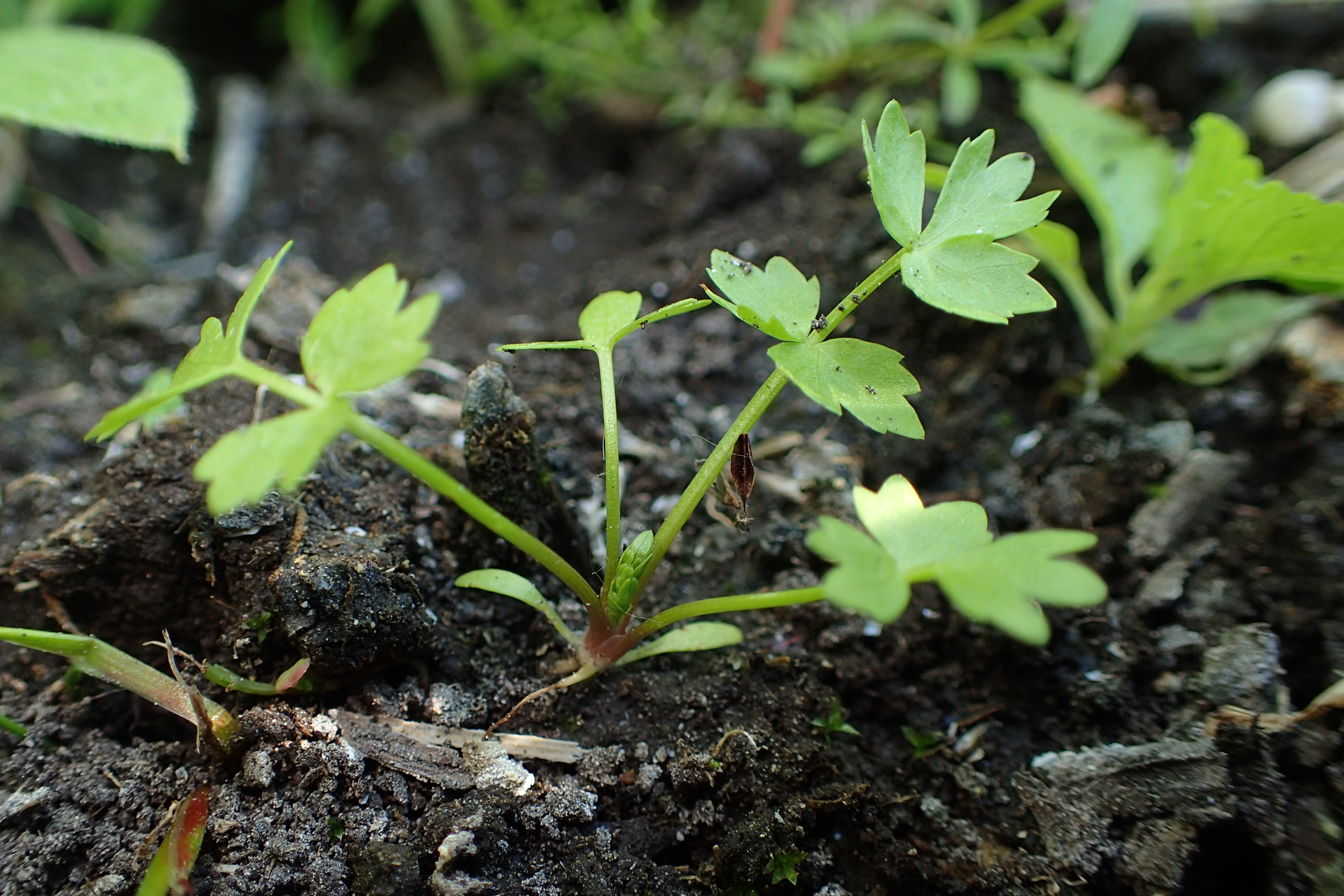
Seedling of creeping marshwort

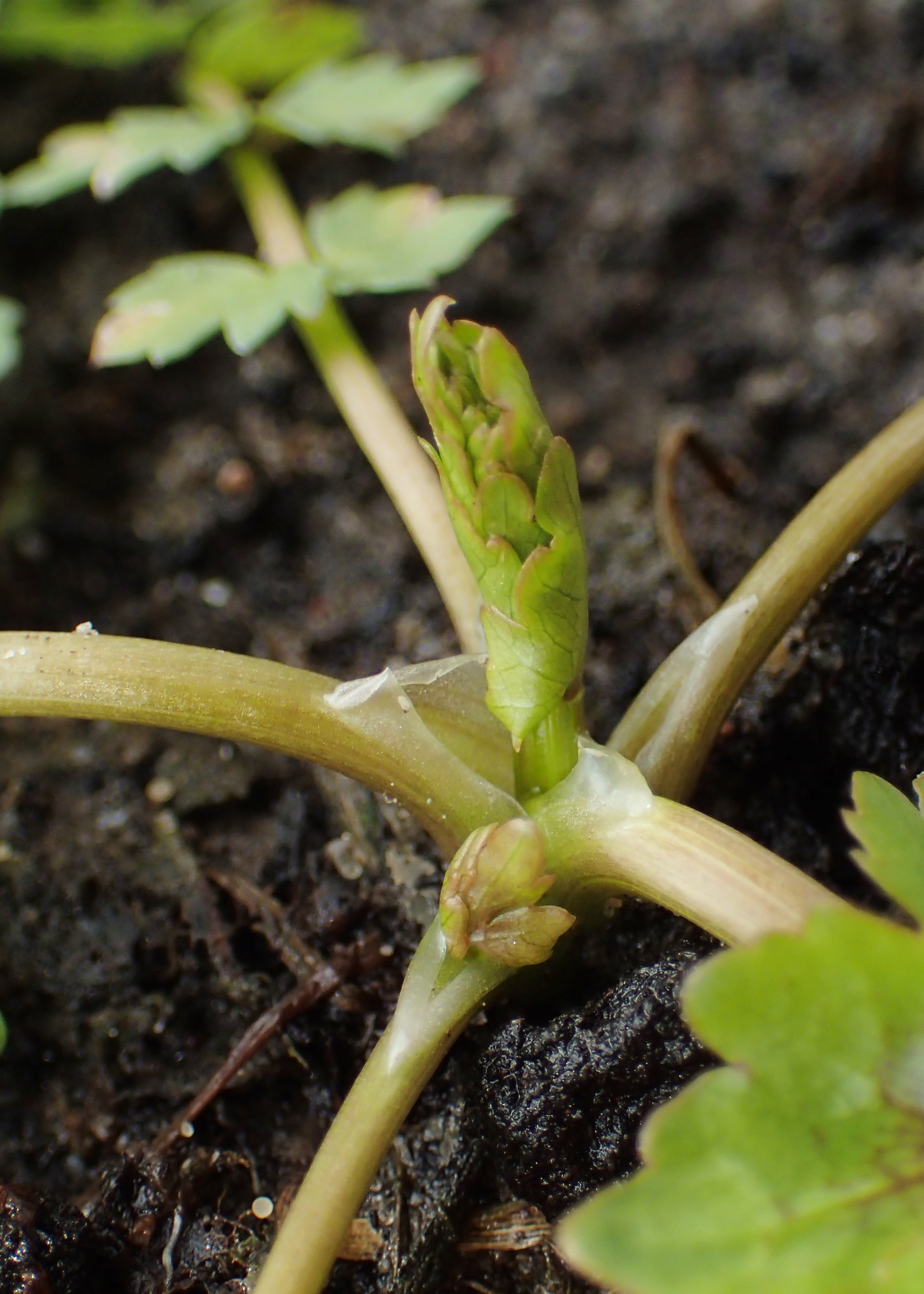
Node with developing leaves

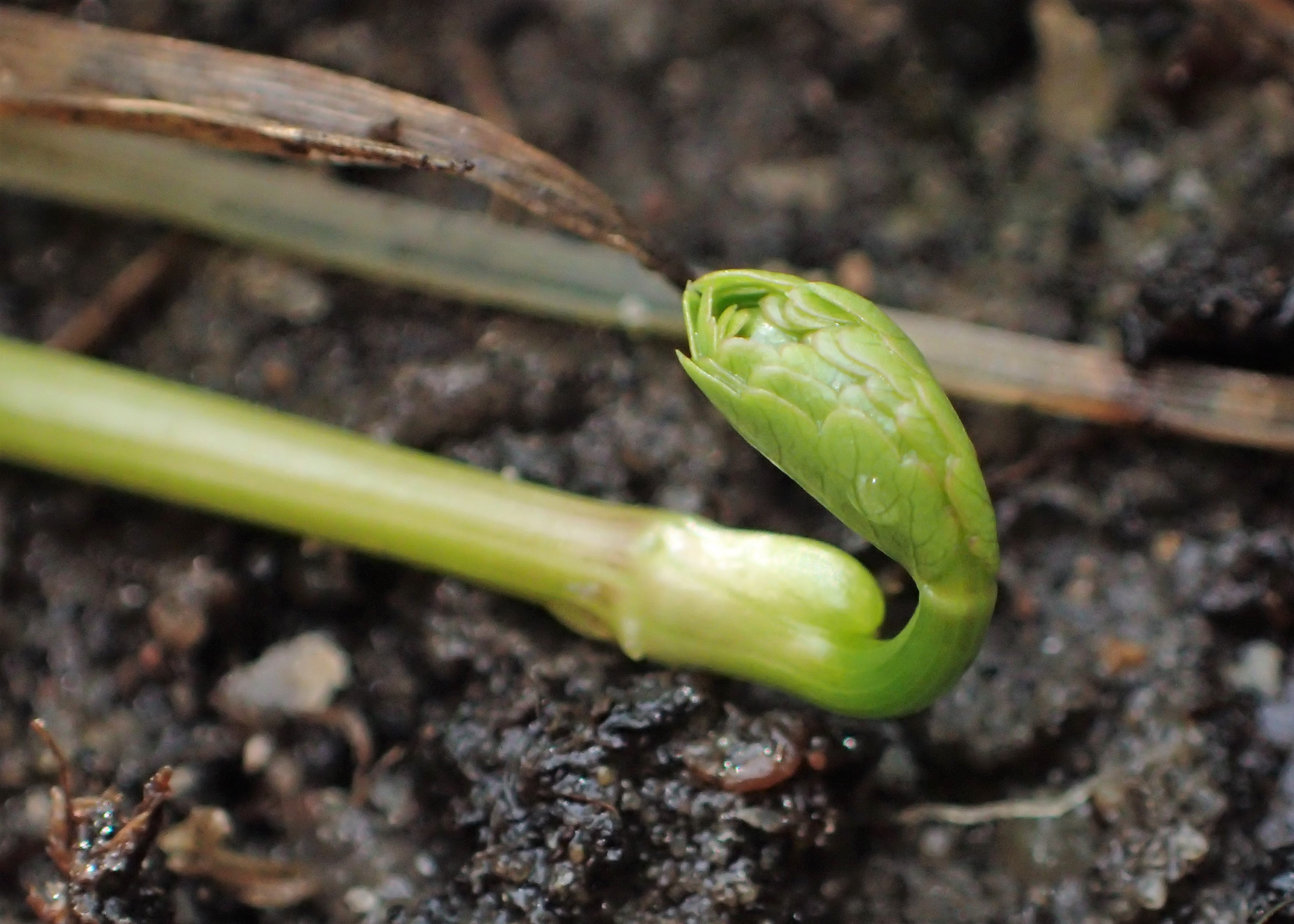
Stolon of creeping marshwort

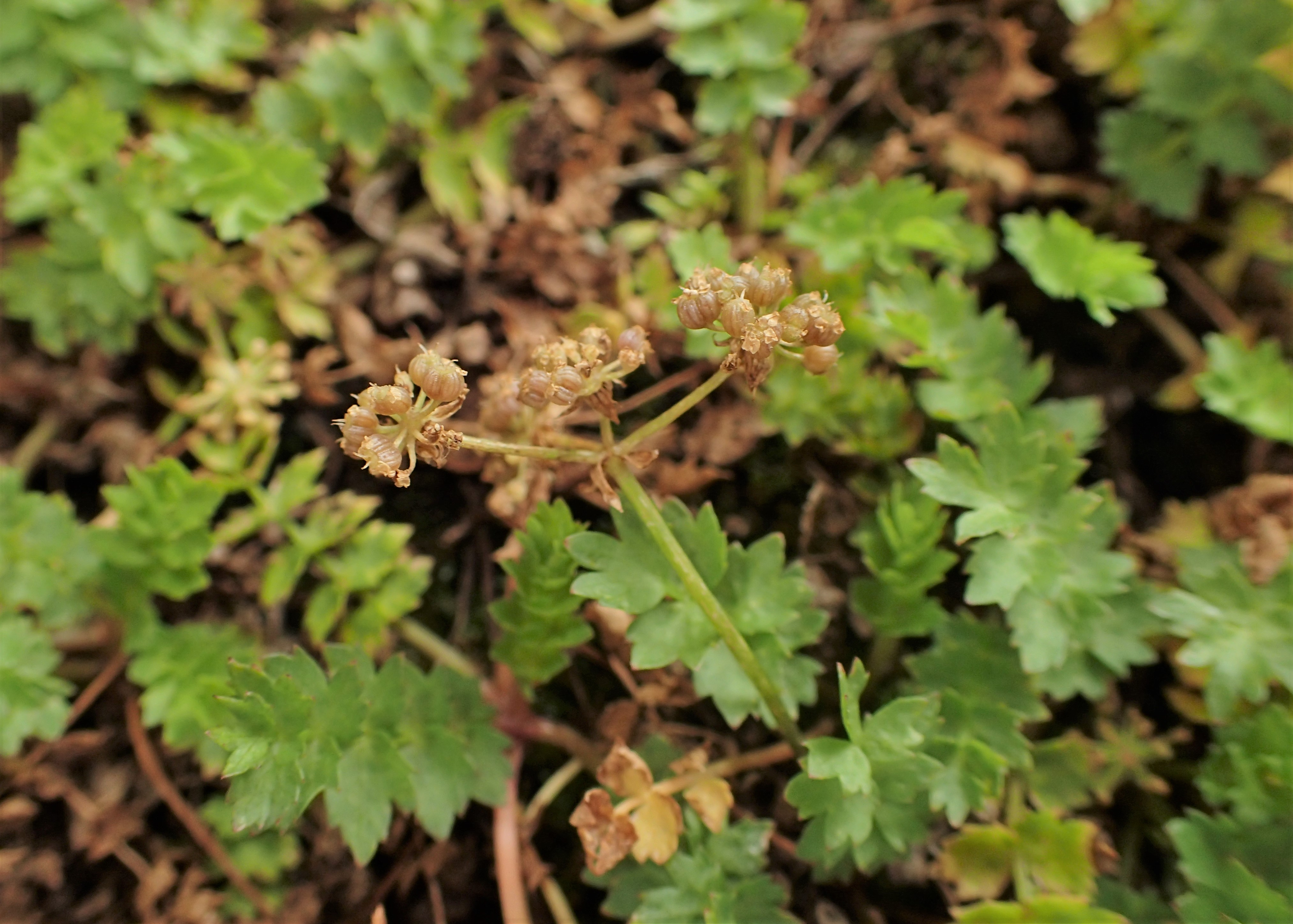
Fruiting creeping marshwort

=== Development ===
The creeping marshwort can be classified as a hemicryptophyte, helophyte, or hydrophyte depending on the habitat conditions. Among plants with a molecular cloning type, creeping marshwort is included in the Fragaria vesca group characterized by the predominance of spreading through stolons with relatively short individual ramet lifespans. Flowering occurs from June to October, with self-pollination playing a significant role. Fruits ripen from August to October.

In Central Europe, it is assumed that the species primarily reproduces vegetatively through stolons. On the other hand, studies on seed germination ecology suggest that, contrary to previous beliefs, at least in northern Germany, there are no significant problems or limitations for the species to spread via seeds. A complicating factor for generative reproduction may be excessive turf density and the lack of initial microsites free from vegetation.

The seeds have the ability to float in water for at least 50 days without losing their germination capacity, which is significant for their dispersal (hydrochory). They can be carried by water over long distances (in lake basins or along streams), but they can also be moved on a smaller scale within grassland communities during periodic floods, for example, after heavy rains. Outside of water, the fruits are transported by wind and animals, both attached to fur and hooves (epizoochory) and consumed (endozoochory).

Seeds partially germinate in the same season they mature, even those floating in water. The seeds form a persistent soil seed bank, retaining the ability to germinate when buried in the soil (even up to 70 years). The density of seeds on species' habitats is recorded at about a thousand seeds per square meter. Seed germination occurs under a wide range of abiotic conditions. In terms of temperature, germination is limited only by high temperatures, which rarely occur in habitats wet and humid enough for the species. It thrives in variable temperatures, although it is not necessary. Good light conditions are necessary for germination. Seeds germinate well on moist substrate, even when flooded for two weeks, which usually limits competition from other species (in places where water stagnates, seeds of most species enter a dormant phase).

Creeping marshwort populations exhibit large fluctuations in the number of individuals depending on prevailing water conditions or other interactions, such as grazing. In locations on pastures, plants may seemingly disappear during periods of intense cattle grazing, only to quickly recolonize gaps in the sward during breaks in grazing. Naked patches of soil exposed by the trampling of wet soil by cows' hooves are significant for maintaining creeping marshwort on pastures. Due to the length of the stolons, these plants utilize gaps in the sward up to 10–15 cm away from them. For creeping marshwort to persist on pastures, grazing frequency is important – too infrequent grazing results in strong development of vegetation competing with this species and, consequently, its decline.

=== Genetics ===
The chromosome number is 2n=22. A low genetic diversity within populations was observed, particularly in the lowland (northern) part of Germany, while in the southern part of the country (Bavaria), the differentiation between populations was slightly higher.

== Ecology ==
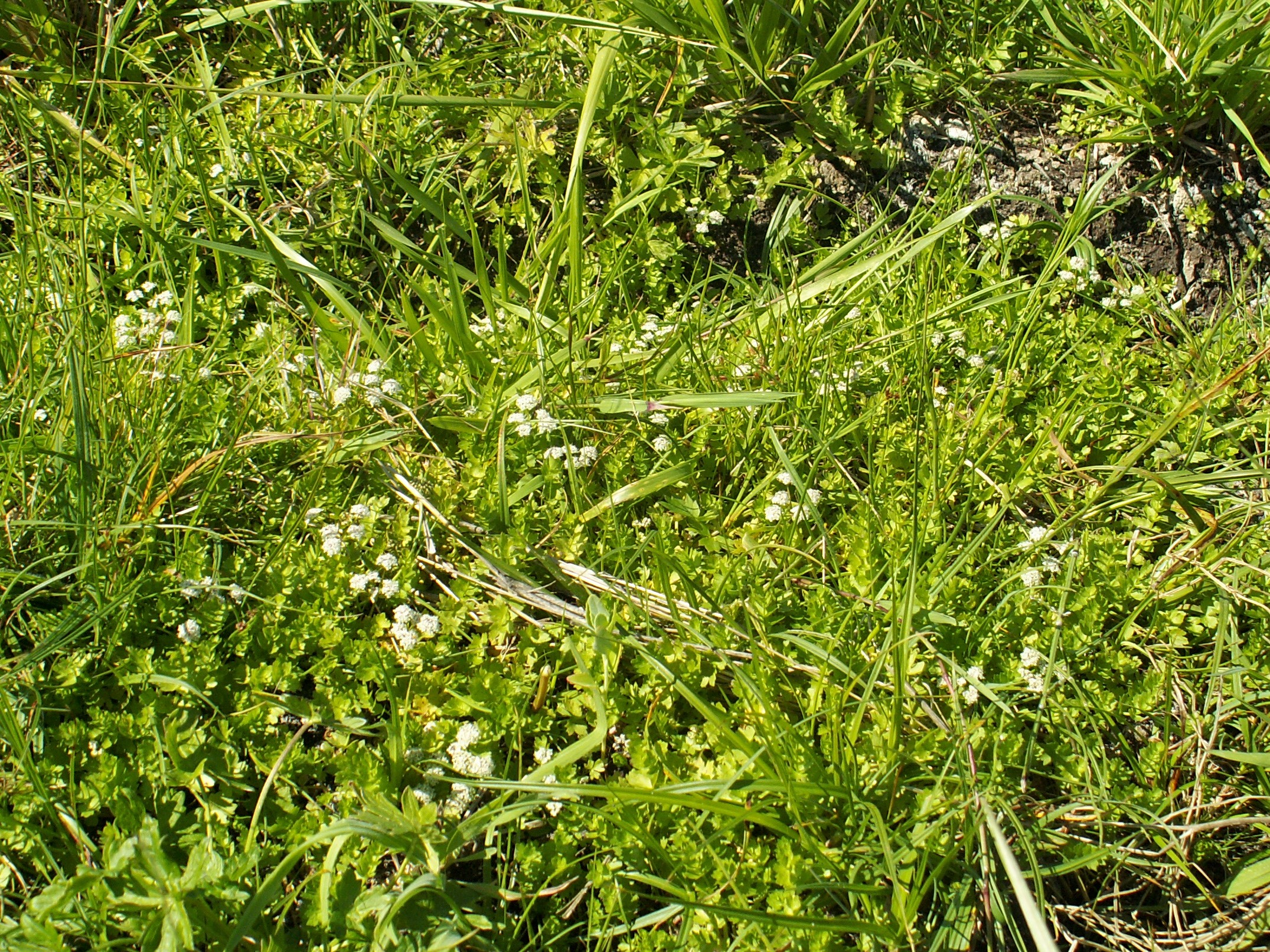
Creeping marshwort in a pasture on Lake Miedwie in Poland

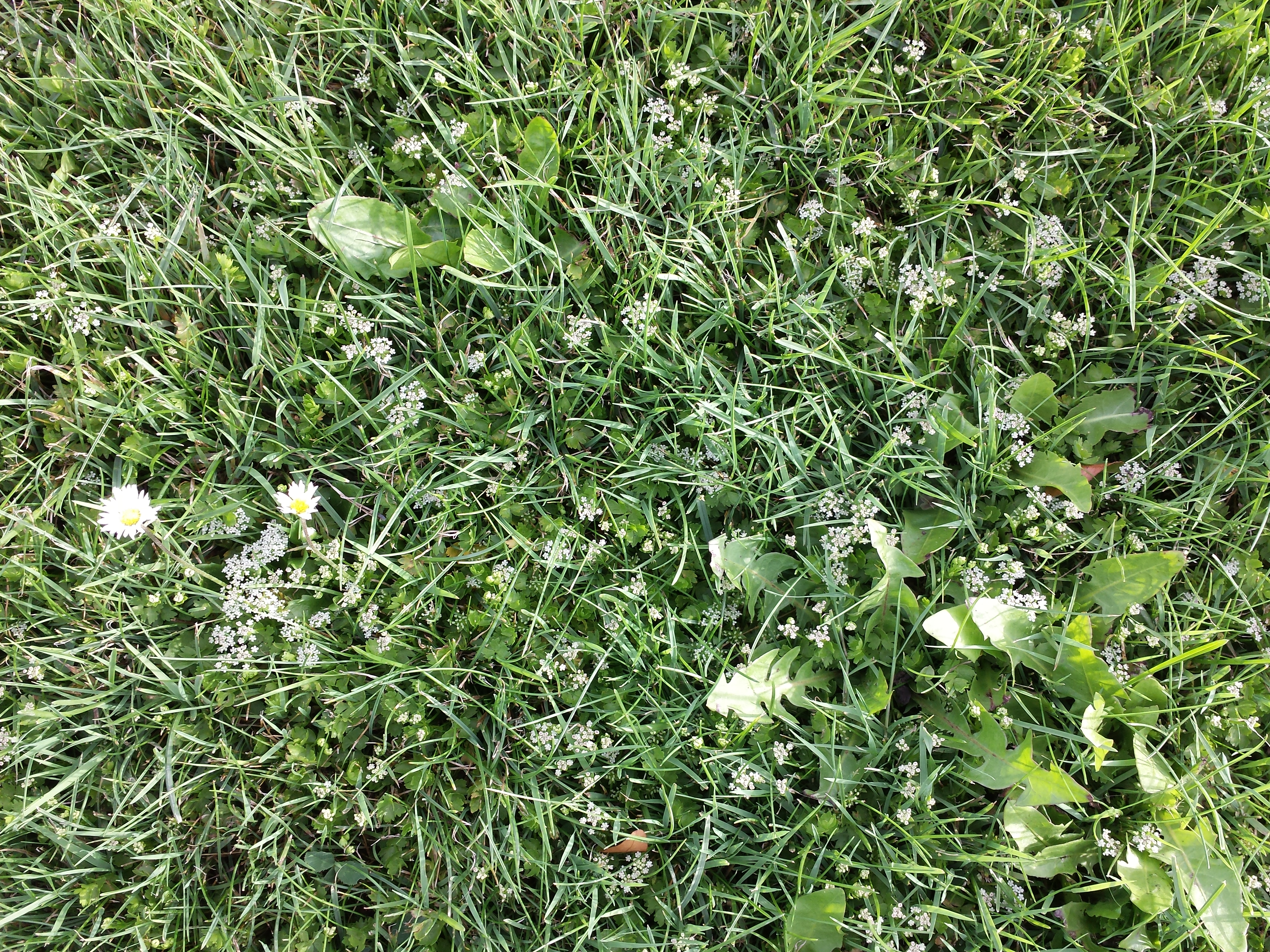
Creeping marshwort on a low-mowed lawn in Vienna

=== Habitat ===
Creeping marshwort is a light-demanding pioneer species on wet, nitrogen-rich soil. It occurs along water edges, especially lakeshores, in communities of low vegetation flooded outside the growing season, and in gaps in reed beds. Another primary habitat is small depressions in the terrain, flooded in the spring and later drying out, in the Netherlands also interdune depressions on the seaside. In places flooded in winter and spring, the bare soil surface is exposed after the water level drops, enabling the development of light-demanding creeping marshwort. Grazing by animals also favors its growth by chewing up competitive vegetation. Secondary habitats are pastures, usually extensive (over 50 ha), where cattle are extensively grazed, sometimes also horses, as well as places trampled on the edges of waters, e.g., on beaches and boat launching sites, and within recreational areas, including those landscaped as lawns. However, excessive trampling and grazing by animals can eliminate this species.

These plants inhabit fertile, moderately fertile, and poor soils, rich in nitrogen compounds, neutral to slightly acidic or slightly alkaline. The mechanical and chemical composition of soils varies at different sites. A constant feature of habitats is the near-neutral soil pH and high humidity (although often with a significant drop in water level by the end of summer). The species' habitats are periodically flooded or inundated with water for a longer period. In particular, places flooded in winter are preferred. While these plants tolerate winter flooding well, prolonged submergence in the summer can lead to plant death (plants die when flooded for more than 56 days or repeatedly inundated for shorter periods). These plants can tolerate shorter and less frequent floods, losing their roots and floating on the water surface. However, creeping marshwort growing in water does not flower. Submergence of the species' habitats in the summer stimulates seed germination. However, these plants wither when watered with saltwater, although sometimes they grow on slightly saline coastal alluvia.

Due to the pioneer character of the species, a constant feature of its occupied sites is the high frequency and intensity of interactions leading to the limited development of competitive vegetation. The habitat characteristics conditioning the development of creeping marshwort include low vegetation height (optimally not exceeding 20 cm) or at least the presence of gaps (e.g., in reed beds), lack of shading caused by trees and shrubs, and absence of competitive expansive species (strongly growing ones).

The plants tolerate frosts down to -20°C.

=== Phytosociology and interspecies interactions ===
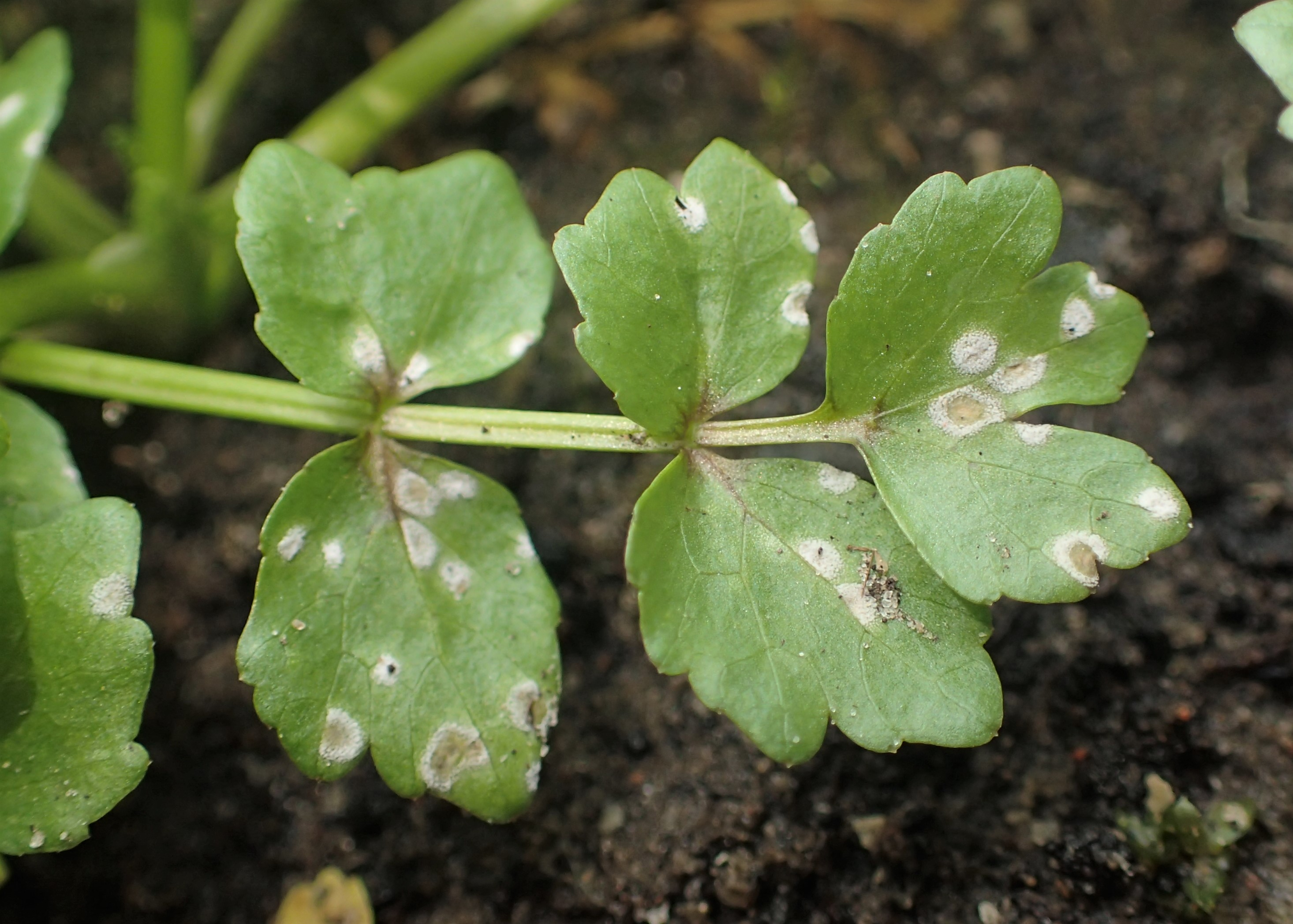
Leaf of creeping marshwort infested with Entyloma helosciadii fungus

Creeping marshwort grows in Central Europe in communities of floodplain meadows from the Lolio-Potentillion anserinae association (Agropyro-Rumicion crispi), usually species-poor, as well as in richer communities of Triglochino-Agrostietum stoloniferae and Ranunculo-Alopecuretum geniculati. The most common accompanying species of creeping marshwort (growing with them on over 50% of sites in northern Germany) include: creeping bentgrass (Agrostis stolonifera), creeping buttercup (Ranunculus repens), silverweed (Potentilla anserina), water mint (Mentha aquatica), jointleaf rush (Juncus articulatus), hairy sedge (Carex hirta), white clover (Trifolium repens), common marsh bedstraw (Galium palustre), and Kentucky bluegrass (Poa pratensis).

In the British Isles, creeping marshwort is recorded in grass communities dominated by creeping bentgrass (Agrostis stolonifera) and water foxtail (Alopecurus geniculatus) and creeping buttercup (Ranunculus repens), as well as in trampled grasslands of annual meadow grass (Poa annua) and broadleaf plantain (Plantago major). Alongside dominants in these communities, the most common species include: water mint (Mentha aquatica), common marsh bedstraw (Galium palustre), true forget-me-not (Myosotis scorpioides), great yellow-cress (Rorippa palustris), and marsh speedwell (Veronica scutellata).

In France, the species is indicated as associated with the association of Hydrocotylo vulgaris-Baldellion ranunculoidis communities, with vegetation typical of the shores of oligotrophic reservoirs. On the Iberian Peninsula, creeping marshwort grows on the banks of mountain streams accompanied by Glyceria declinata.

Grazing of creeping marshwort by herbivorous animals (e.g., cattle in pastures) may affect the condition of plants, hinder their development, including fruit formation, but it benefits the population and ensures its sustainability by limiting the development of competitive vegetation and creating microhabitats optimal for this species. This, in turn, enables the spread of creeping marshwort in pastures independently of microhabitats shaped solely by the influence of water conditions – without grazing, creeping marshwort retreats, and its distribution is limited only to local depressions.

Creeping marshwort leaves are readily consumed by snails and ducks. In Morocco, they are fed upon by Barbary macaques. Plants are also sometimes seriously attacked by aphids feeding on both leaves, root necks and roots. In Polish sites, no feeding on plants by invertebrates or signs of disease affecting the population have been observed.

== Systematics and variability ==
The species represents the genus Helosciadium, which includes all European species formerly classified in the genus Apium except for its type species – celeriac (Apium graveolens). Traditionally, the genus Helosciadium was classified as a section within Apium for much of the 20th century, resulting in widespread use of the scientific name attributing it to this genus in the literature. However, the separate genus Helosciadium is well supported by molecular, morphological, and chemical analyses. This genus belongs to the tribe Oenantheae, closely related to Berula and Sium, while the Apium genus represents another tribe – Apieae.

Within the genus, the species is most closely related to fool's watercress (Helosciadium nodiflorum), with which it forms a sister group relative to three species: Helosciadium inundatum, Helosciadium crassipes, and Helosciadium bermejoi.

Under the name Apium × longipedunculatum, a hybrid with fool's watercress (Helosciadium nodiflorum) has been described, confirmed in genetic studies. This hybrid differs from Helosciadium nodiflorum in having a creeping and more strongly rooting stem at the nodes. In some locations where parent specimens grew together, only this hybrid remained after creeping marshwort disappeared. Earlier, based solely on morphological observations, such a hybrid was also described (as Apium × riddelsdellii Druce), but the diagnosis from 1917 is considered doubtful (at the site, a morphologically very similar intergeneric hybrid between Helosciadium nodiflorum and lesser water-parsnip (Berula erecta) – × Beruladium – was also observed contemporarily, in addition to similar parent taxa).

== Nomenclature ==
The species was first scientifically described as Sium repens by Nikolaus Joseph von Jacquin in his work Flora Austriaca, published in 1775. Subsequently, Mariano Lagasca y Segura described the species as a representative of the Apium genus under the name Apium repens (Jacq.) Lag. (1821), and three years later, it was classified by Johann F.W. Koch as Helosciadium repens (Jacq.) W.D.J. Koch (1824), a classification currently considered appropriate from a systematic standpoint. However, in 1867, Heinrich Gustav Reichenbach again placed species from the genus Helosciadium within the genus Apium, and this generic name was subsequently established in the literature of the second half of the 19th century and the entire 20th century.

The name Helosciadium is derived from the combination of the Greek words hélos and skiás, meaning "swamp" and "canopy" respectively, inspired by the habitat occupied by these plants and the type of inflorescence. The specific epithet repens comes from the Latin word repo, meaning "creeping" or "trailing".

=== Synonyms ===
The species has been described under the following names currently recognized as synonyms:

- Apium repens (Jacq.) Lag.
- Apium nodiflorum subsp. repens (Jacq.) Thell. in Hegi
- Helodium repens (Jacq.) Dumort.
- Helosciadium palatinum F.W.Schultz ex Nyman
- Laoberdes repens (Jacq.) Raf.
- Sium repens Jacq.

== Threats and protection ==
The species has not been globally assessed for its endangerment status, but almost its entire geographical range is within Europe, where it has been considered near threatened (NT) at the continent scale. It is protected by the Berne Convention and the Habitats Directive. It is a subject of protection in 167 Natura 2000 sites in the European Union. In all countries where the species occurs, it is listed on red lists of threatened species. Among the threatened species of European plants, it ranks third in terms of distribution (measured by the number of countries where it grows).

This plant has been under strict protection in Poland since 2001. Since 2004, it has been under species protection with the reservation that the species requires active protection, and since 2012, legal protection also applies to activities related to conducting rational agricultural, forestry, or fishing management.

The main reasons for the decline of the species at its habitats include the cessation of meadow and pasture use, which leads to the development of tall, competitive meadow vegetation that displaces this heliophilous, low species. Another significant problem is the drainage of such habitats, especially eliminating winter water stagnation. Excessive grazing can also lead to the disappearance of the creeping marshwort. Destruction of lake shores due to tourism and recreation and displacement due to natural ecological succession by meadow, marsh, or forest vegetation are also considered threats. In the British Isles, populations of this species may be threatened by invasions of the alien species Crassula helmsii, and in Central Europe, locally, sweet flag (Acorus calamus) poses a problem. In Western Europe, potential threats also include hybridization of the species with fool's watercress (Helosciadium nodiflorum).

From climate change models, it follows that a significant area of the current range will be reduced due to forecasted climate changes in the coming decades (global warming). Outside the climatic optimum of the species, extensive areas will be found in southern Europe, but also in lowlands from France through Germany to Poland. Favorable conditions for the species will arise in higher mountain areas (mainly the Alps and the Carpathians) and in areas under the influence of an oceanic climate in Northern Europe (the central part of Great Britain, the Jutland Peninsula, the central part of the Scandinavian Peninsula). In Poland, the conditions for the occurrence of the species will worsen in lakeland areas but will be maintained or improved in mountainous and upland areas and on the coast.

Conservation actions include, among others, creating gaps in dense vegetation patches within the species' habitats, facilitating the germination of its seeds (germination is stimulated by access to light and can occur at different times of the year except winter). Due to the long viability of creeping marshwort's seeds in the soil seed bank, it is possible to restore this species to its habitats if habitat conditions improve (the species has been successfully restored to some sites in Great Britain in this way). Key to the species' conservation is maintaining floods in the winter-spring period and extensive grazing. Effective in creating surrogate sites and reintroductions is introducing seedlings to new locations with suitable habitat conditions.

Protective measures involving the collection of plants from nature, their multiplication, and reinforcement of threatened populations, as well as the restoration of vanished sites, have also been successfully carried out in Poland in Gniezno and in the Przemęt Landscape Park.

== Properties ==
=== Edible plant ===
Due to the traditional, albeit erroneous, inclusion of this species in the Apium genus, this species (and others in the Helosciadium genus) have likely been attributed with similar nutritional and medicinal properties as celery root, which is a popular vegetable. On the other hand, determining the true relationship and systematic position of this species may not change much in assessing its edibility (lesser water-parsnip (Berula erecta) from the closest related genus to Helosciadium, is also edible). The leaves of creeping marshwort have a pleasant, mild taste reminiscent of parsley.

The long-standing recognition of creeping marshwort as a species closely related to celeriac has led to initiatives aimed at protecting this species as a genetic reserve for celery.

=== Ornamental plant ===
Due to its prostrate growth habit and its ability to form dense mats in favorable conditions, the plant is used as ground cover in sunny areas along pond banks.

== Cultivation ==
=== Propagation ===
Plants of this species can be propagated by division and from seeds. Vegetatively, they can easily be multiplied by dividing the stolons. In an experiment, stolons cut into pieces (each including at least one node) rooted and produced new shoots on average in 86%.

In the case of cultivation aimed at increasing the species' resources in nature, especially for creating new replacement habitats, it is recommended to propagate plants from seeds obtained from different populations. This allows increasing the genetic diversity of populations at the established habitats. Stratification is recommended, involving storing the seeds in darkness and cool temperatures for two months (e.g., on moist substrate at 4°C). The seeds are then sown on standard horticultural substrate and kept in a moist greenhouse. For obtaining as many seedlings as possible, vegetative division of the obtained plants is recommended. After planting at the target habitats, particularly in areas grazed by animals, it is advisable to fence the newly planted plants in the initial period to allow them to establish well (shortly after transplantation, they are easily pulled out of the ground by foraging animals). It is also optimal to remove competitive plants by planting the creeping marshwort in strips of bare soil. The best results are achieved by planting during humid weather, preferably at the beginning of autumn. In case of drought, significant losses may occur among freshly planted plants. Since losses are usually expected in the first year of cultivation, to obtain a sustainable population, it is recommended to use as much plant material as possible when creating replacement habitats.

=== Maintenance ===
To maintain the species, it is necessary to limit competitive vegetation through grazing or mowing and to maintain disturbances in the vegetation at the species' occurrence site (e.g., trampling by animals, flooding, and water stagnation during the winter-spring period).
