= Apium insulare =

Scientific classification
- Kingdom: Plantae
- Clade: Tracheophytes
- Clade: Angiosperms
- Clade: Eudicots
- Clade: Asterids
- Order: Apiales
- Family: Apiaceae
- Genus: Apium
- Species: A. insulare

Binomial name
- Apium insulare P.S.Short

Species of flowering plant

Apium insulare, Flinders Island celery, or Island celery is a herb of the Bass Strait islands, and Lord Howe Island, Australia. It is a member of the Apiaceae (carrot family).

It was first described by Philip Short in 1979.

== Uses ==
It is considered to be "worth investigating" as a food plant.

== Physical characteristics ==
The species is hermaphrodite (has both male and female organs). It is suitable for light (sandy), medium (loamy) and heavy (clay) soils. The suitable pH for it to grow acid, neutral and basic (alkaline) soils. It can grow in semi-shade (light woodland) or no shade. It prefers moist soil.
