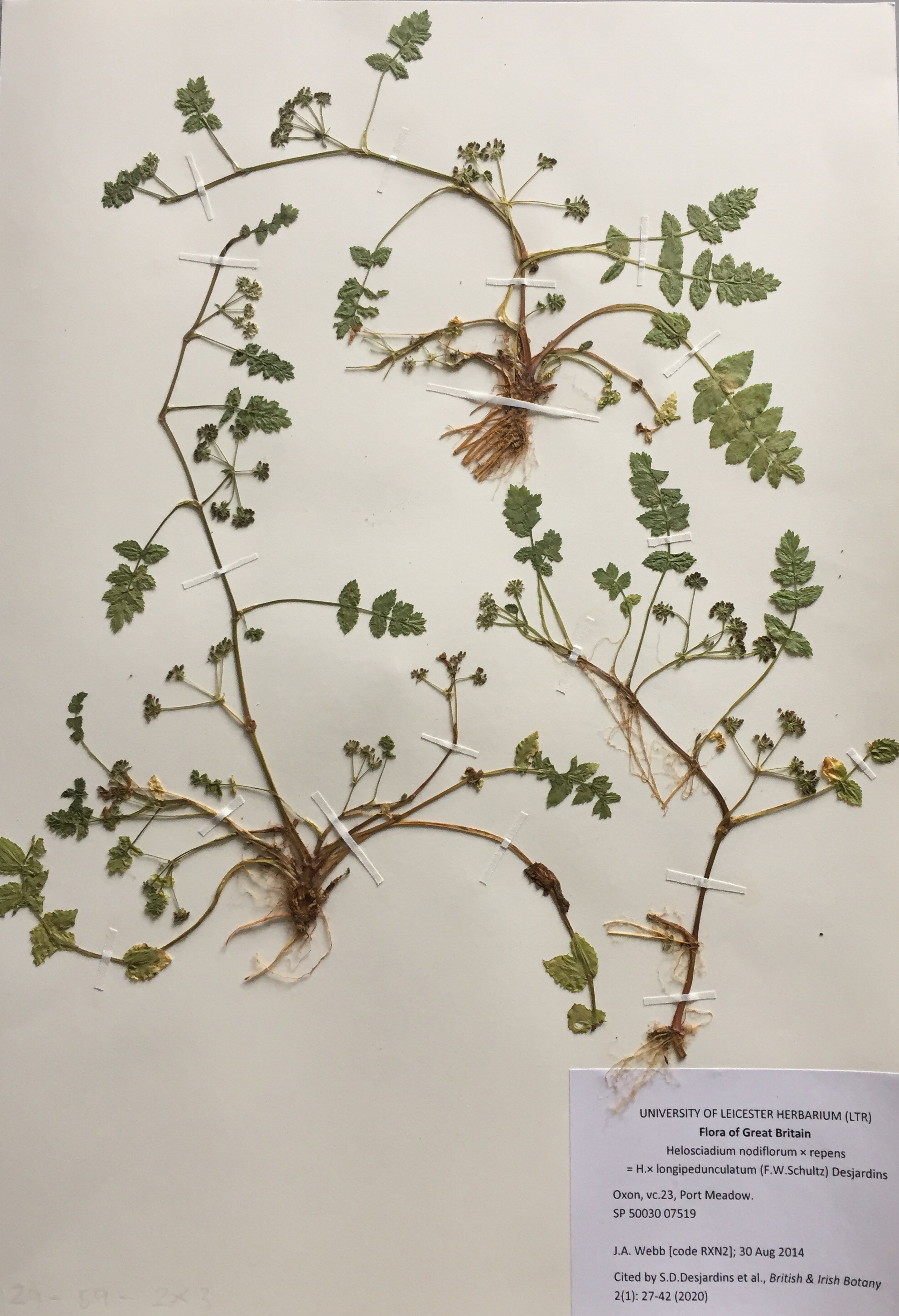

Scientific classification
- Kingdom: Plantae
- Clade: Tracheophytes
- Clade: Angiosperms
- Clade: Eudicots
- Clade: Asterids
- Order: Apiales
- Family: Apiaceae
- Genus: Helosciadium
- Species: H. × longipedunculatum

Binomial name
- Helosciadium × longipedunculatum (F.W.Schultz) Desjardins

Synonyms
- Helosciadium nodiflorum var. longipedunculatum F.W.Schultz; Apium × longipedunculatum (F.W.Schultz) Rothm., not validly publ.

= Helosciadium × longipedunculatum =

Species of flowering plant

Helosciadium × longipedunculatum, synonym Apium × longipedunculatum, is a hybrid plant in the umbellifer family (Apiaceae); the result of hybridisation between Helosciadium repens (creeping marshwort) and Helosciadium nodiflorum (fool's water cress).

== Discovery ==
The hybrid was first discovered by George Lawson in July 1845 at Gullane, East Lothian, Scotland, and two voucher specimens were deposited in the herbarium of William Gardiner, Dundee. Following Gardiner's death in 1852 the specimens were transferred as part of a bequest to the British Museum, and shortly afterward (ca. 1854) loaned to German botanist Friedrich W. Schultz, who described them as a new variety of Helosciadium nodiflorum, var. longipedunculatum. The variety was later (1906) described in further detail by Harry J. Riddelsdell and Edumund G. Baker, who examined a number of specimens from the original Gullane locality, as well as additional specimens from Duddingston Loch, Edinburgh, Scotland. While Riddelsdell did not consider var. longipedunuclatum to be of hybrid origin, during the course of the 20th century a number of eminent botanists (e.g. Werner Rothmaler, Clive Stace) suggested that it was the hybrid between H. repens and H. nodiflorum.

In 2014, plants matching H. nodiflorum var. longipedunculatum were collected at Port Meadow, Oxfordshire, England and a molecular analysis confirmed it as the hybrid H. repens × H. nodiflorum.

The original specimens are still housed in the Natural History Museum, London, under voucher number BM001144095, and the one situated to the left has been designated as the lectotype.

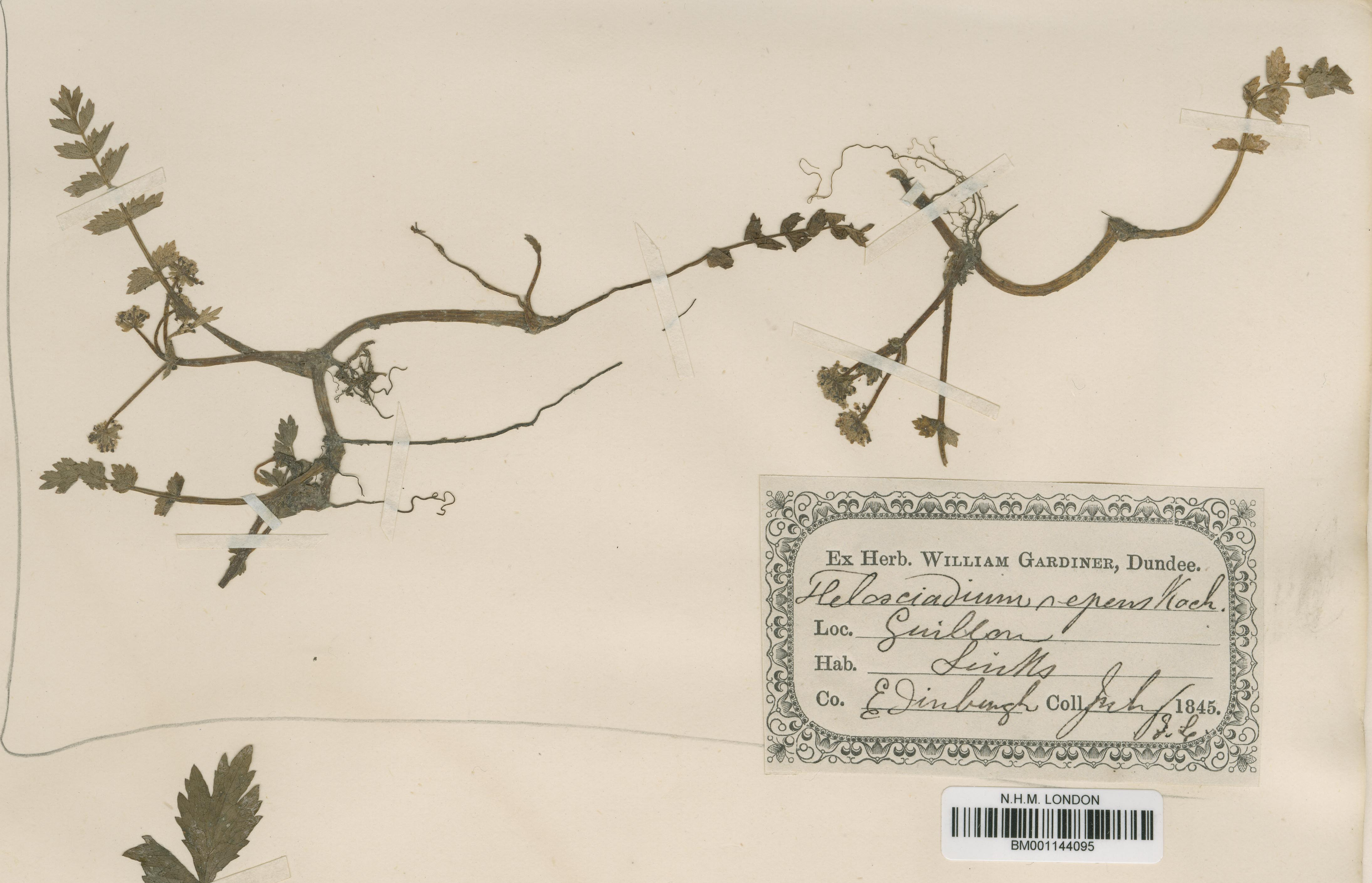
Syntypes of Helosciadium × longipedunculatum (as Apium × longipedunculatum) collected by G.L. ("George Lawson") from Gullane ("Guillon") Links, Scotland in July 1845 (BM001144095). Specimen to left is the lectotype.

== Description ==
Creeping perennial herb with slender stems and rooting at lower nodes. Leaves simply pinnate with 4 to 7 pairs of leaflets, which are ovate to broadly ovate, coarsely serrate and occasionally lobed. Flowering umbels are borne on peduncles, which are equal to or longer than the rays of the umbel, and subtended at the base by an involucre of 1 to 3 bracts. Ripe fruits broader than long.
