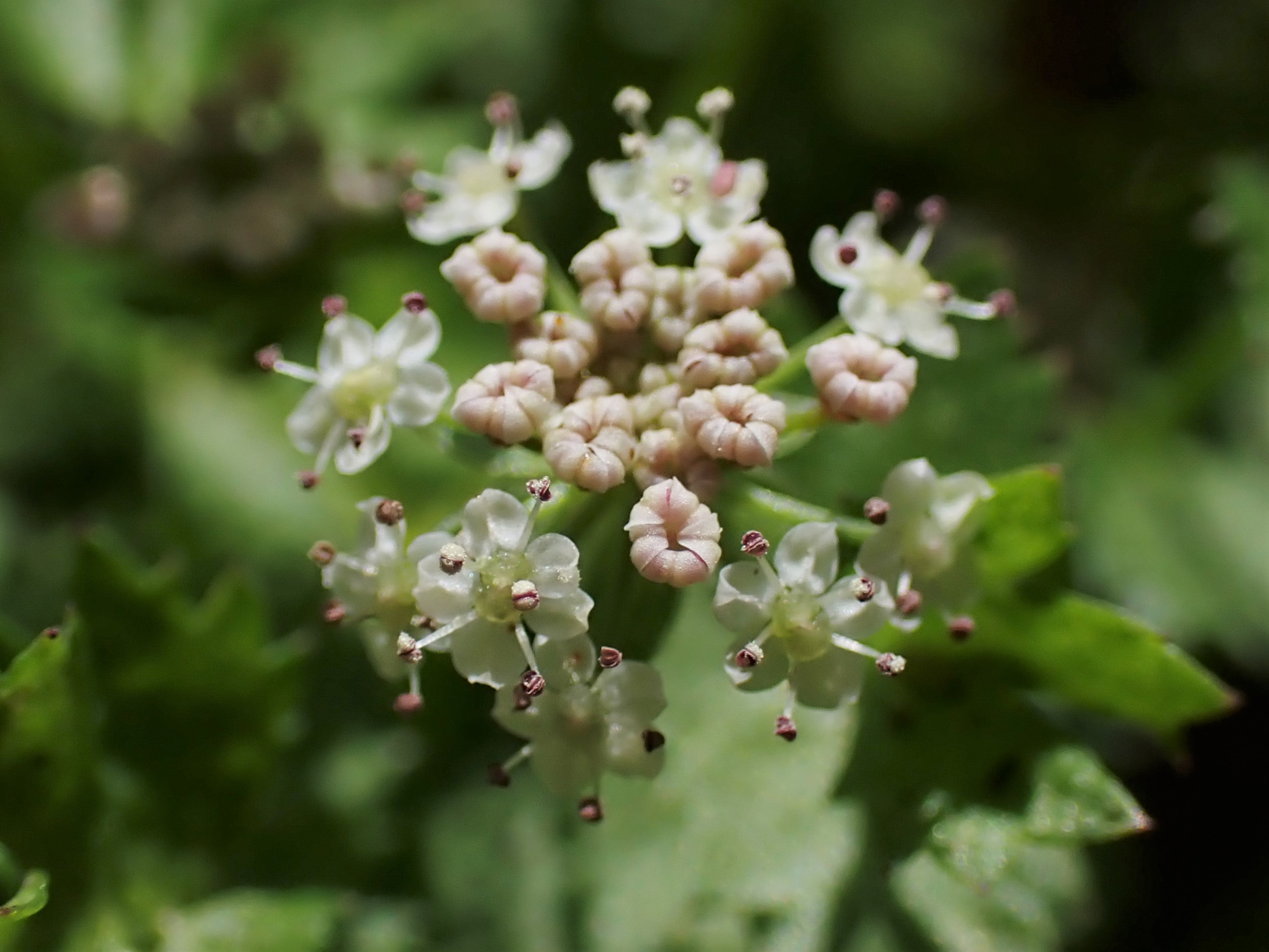
- Helosciadium repens

Scientific classification
- Kingdom: Plantae
- Clade: Embryophytes
- Clade: Tracheophytes
- Clade: Angiosperms
- Clade: Eudicots
- Clade: Asterids
- Order: Apiales
- Family: Apiaceae
- Subfamily: Apioideae
- Tribe: Oenantheae
- Genus: Helosciadium; W.D.J.Koch

Synonyms
- Helodium Dumort.; Heloscia Dumort.

= Helosciadium =

Genus of plants

Helosciadium is a genus of flowering plants belonging to the family Apiaceae.

Its native range is from Europe to Central Asia and Pakistan, Macaronesia to Arabian Peninsula and Tanzania. Helosciadium bermejoi from the island of Menorca is one of the rarest plants in Europe, with fewer than 100 individuals left.

== Species ==
As of January 2023, Plants of the World Online accepted the following species and hybrids:

- Helosciadium bermejoi (L.Llorens) Popper & M.F.Watson
- Helosciadium crassipes W.D.J.Koch ex Rchb.
- Helosciadium inundatum (L.) W.D.J.Koch
- Helosciadium × longipedunculatum (F.W.Schultz) Desjardins
- Helosciadium milfontinum Fern.Prieto, Pinto-Cruz, Nava & Cires
- Helosciadium × moorei (Syme) Bab.
- Helosciadium nodiflorum (L.) W.D.J.Koch
- Helosciadium repens (Jacq.) W.D.J.Koch
