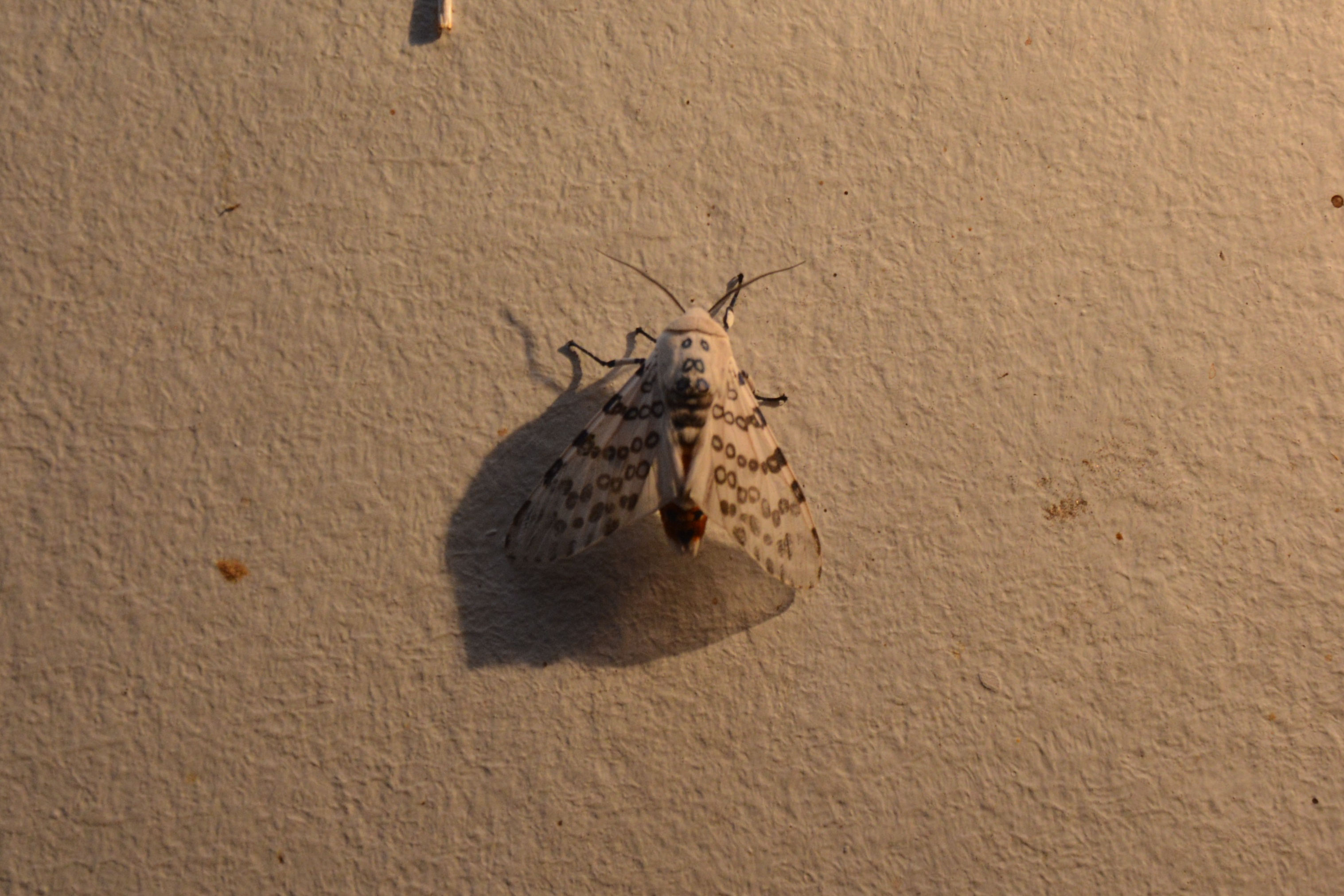

Scientific classification
- Domain: Eukaryota
- Kingdom: Animalia
- Phylum: Arthropoda
- Class: Insecta
- Order: Lepidoptera
- Superfamily: Noctuoidea
- Family: Erebidae
- Subfamily: Arctiinae
- Genus: Hypercompe
- Species: H. icasia

Binomial name
- Hypercompe icasia (Cramer, [1777])

Synonyms
- Phalaena icasia Cramer, [1777]; Bombyx lantanae Fabricius, 1793; Hypercombe eridane Hübner, [1819]

= Hypercompe icasia =

Species of moth

Hypercompe icasia is a moth of the family Erebidae first described by Pieter Cramer in 1777. It is widely distributed in South America and is also found on Martinique, Guadeloupe, Saint Martin, Dominica, St. Kitts, Nevis, St. Thomas, and Puerto Rico.

Larvae have been recorded feeding on Apium, Cecropia, Cissus, Citrus, Erechtites, Erythrina, Ipomoea, Musa, Phaseolus, Psidium, Solanum, and Vanilla species.
