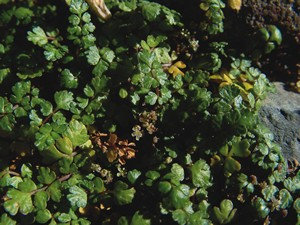

Conservation status
- Critically Endangered (IUCN 3.1)

Scientific classification
- Kingdom: Plantae
- Clade: Tracheophytes
- Clade: Angiosperms
- Clade: Eudicots
- Clade: Asterids
- Order: Apiales
- Family: Apiaceae
- Genus: Helosciadium
- Species: H. bermejoi

Binomial name
- Helosciadium bermejoi (L.Llorens) Popper & M.F.Watson

Synonyms
- Apium bermejoi L.Llorens

= Helosciadium bermejoi =

Species of flowering plant

Helosciadium bermejoi, synonym Apium bermejoi, is a critically endangered species of flowering plant in the family Apiaceae.

== Taxonomy ==
Formerly included in the genus Apium, genetic analysis showed it not to be closely related to the type species of that genus (wild celery Apium graveolens), and it has now been transferred to the genus Helosciadium in the tribe Oenantheae.

== Distribution ==
H. bermejoi is endemic to Menorca in the Balearic Islands of Spain, and the total population is now restricted to a single locality in the northeast part of the island. Across the two populations at this spot, there are fewer than a hundred individuals surviving.

== Ecology ==
Its natural habitat is Mediterranean-type shrubby vegetation, known as matorral.

== Conservation ==
It was classified as 'critically endangered' in the IUCN Red List in 2006. In the European Union it has been designated as a 'priority species' under Annex II of the Habitats Directive since 1992, which means areas in which it occurs can be declared Special Areas of Conservation, if these areas belong to one of the number of habitats listed in Annex I of the directive.
