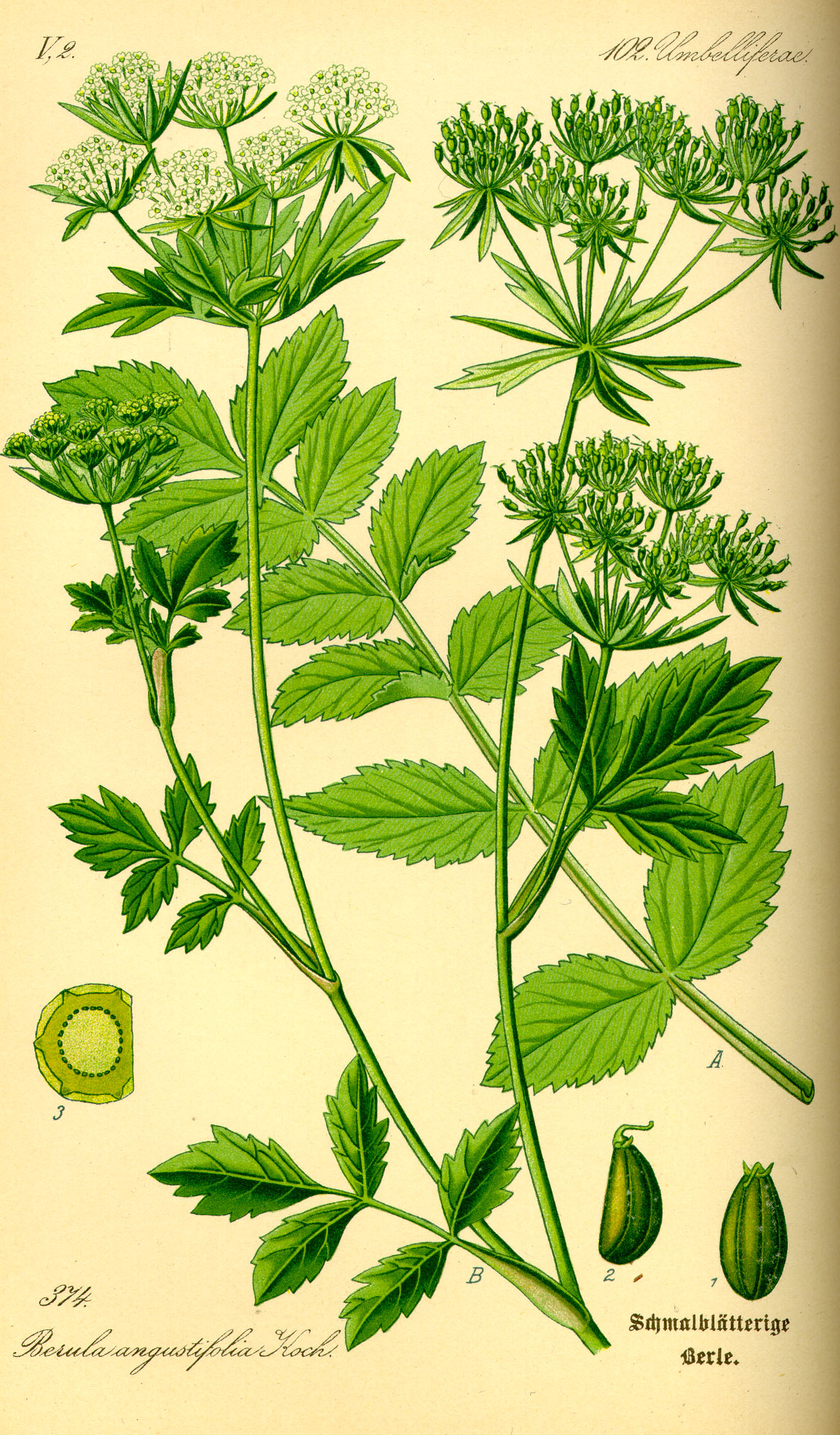
- 1885 illustration

Conservation status
- Least Concern (IUCN 3.1)

Scientific classification
- Kingdom: Plantae
- Clade: Tracheophytes
- Clade: Angiosperms
- Clade: Eudicots
- Clade: Asterids
- Order: Apiales
- Family: Apiaceae
- Genus: Berula
- Species: B. erecta

Binomial name
- Berula erecta (Huds.) Coville

Synonyms
- Synonymy: Apium berula Caruel; Apium sium Crantz; Berla monspeliensium Bubani; Berula angustifolia Greene; Berula incisa (Torr.) G.N.Jones; Berula orientalis Woronow ex Schischk.; Berula pusilla (Nutt.) Fernald; Carum sioides J.M.Black; Selinum berula E.H.L.Krause; Siella erecta (Huds.) Pimenov; Sium erectum Huds.; Sium incisum Torr.; Sium orientale Soó; Sium pusillum Nutt.; Sium thunbergii DC.

= Berula erecta =

Species of plant

Berula erecta, known as lesser water-parsnip, cutleaf waterparsnip, or narrow-leaved water-parsnip, is a member of the carrot family. Growing to around 1 m (3 ft) tall, it is found in or by water. It is widespread across much of Europe, Asia, Australia, and North America.

Berula erecta has a hollow stem. Underwater leaves consist of compound with thread-like lobes; leaves above the surface of the water are flatter and broader. The plant produces many small white flowers in a compound umbel.

== Description ==
Berula erecta occurs on poorly drained neutral and acidic soils of the lowlands and upland fringe. It is found in the South West of England, especially in Devon. It typically resides in shallow aquatic environments containing moderate nutrient levels. During the winter, its stem and body become completely submerged underwater. Berula erecta has been shown to survive and grow better after living in stressful conditions with either limiting or excess nutrients or mechanical stress.

Berula erecta has toothed leaves from one and a half to two inches across, each containing around twenty white flowers. The plant can grow from around one to three feet tall. The stalk has a pale ring at its base that makes the plant distinguishable, and has a scent of carrot or parsnip when crushed.

The natural communities for Berula erecta are as listed:

- Emergent marsh
- Floodplain forest
- Hardwood-conifer swamp
- Headwater stream (1st-2nd order), riffle
- Headwater stream (1st-2nd order), pool
- Headwater stream (1st-2nd order), run
- Prairie fen
- Rich conifer swamp
- Rich tamarack swamp
- Southern shrub-carr
- Southern wet meadow

== Uses ==
The Zuni people use Berula erecta as an ingredient of "schumaakwe cakes" and used it externally for rheumatism. An infusion of the whole plant is used as wash for rashes and athlete's foot infection.

Some Native American peoples have been known to use Berula erecta for medicinal purposes.

Berula erecta has been studied for its essential oil that has been believed to possibly have medicinal uses. The plant's essential oil has been shown to contain polyacetylenes. Polyacetylenes have a wide range of beneficial medicinal effects. One is its nematodicidal effects that could potentially be beneficial in agriculture as well its positive effects on human health. Polyacetylenes also are antifungal, antibacterial, and have antiallergenic and anti-inflammatory properties.

However, medicinal use of pure polyacetylenes is not feasible due to their high chemical instability as well as a tendency to evoke allergic reactions. For this reason, consuming smaller and less pure amounts of polyacetylenes from the essential oil of Berula erecta may be viable.

Following the first cut of the season, Berula erecta will likely regrow and produce flowers several times again in the same growing season.

== Conservation ==
Berula erecta (lesser water parsnip) is a component of Purple moor grass and rush pastures - a type of Biodiversity Action Plan habitat in the UK.

The species is globally classified as a least-concern species, but is a threatened species in the United States. In Estonia, it is a near-threatened species and an endangered species in Norway.

The species is threatened by invasive wetland species such as watercress that can quickly destroy its habitat.

Recommended steps to promote conservation of Berula erecta are keeping an open canopy for the species as well as maintenance of groundwater sources that may include periodic controlled burns.
