= Water parsnip =

Water parsnip is a common name given to a number of flowering plants in the family Apiaceae, including those from the Berula and Sium genera.

- Berula

- Berula erecta, cutleaf water parsnip or water parsnip

- Sium

- Sium latifolium, greater water parsnip, or water parsnip
- Sium suave, or water parsnip

== See also ==
- Parsnip (disambiguation)
