= Jellico =

Jellico may refer to:

== People ==
- John Jellico (1856–1925) Irish-British Olympic sailor

=== Fictional characters ===
- Edward Jellico, a Star Trek character
- Captain Jellico from the Solar Queen novel series by Andre Norton
- Mrs. Jellico, a fictional character from the 1941 film For Beauty's Sake

== Places ==
- Jellico, Tennessee, USA
- Jellico Creek, Kentucky and Tennessee, USA; a creek, see Jellico, Tennessee
- Jellico, Southlake, Texas, USA
- Jellico, Lassen County, California, USA; see List of places in California (J)

== Other uses ==
- Large jellico or jellico (Sium bracteatum), a flowering plant species
- Dwarf jellico or jellico (Sium burchellii), a flowering plant species
- Jellico (Sium), a genus of flowering plant

== See also ==
- Bon Jellico, Kentucky, USA; see List of ghost towns in Kentucky
- Jellicoe (disambiguation)
