= Parsnip (disambiguation) =

A parsnip is a root vegetable closely related to carrot and parsley.

Some varieties of parsnip include:

- Cow parsnip, also known as hogweed
- Northern Indian parsnip, also known as aromatic spring-parsley or turpentine cymopterus
- Water parsnip, a common name given to a number of flowering plants in the family Apiaceae
  - Cutleaf meadow-parsnip
  - Greater water-parsnip, also commonly known as great water-parsnip and wideleaf waterparsnip
  - Sium suave, also known as the water parsnip or hemlock waterparsnip
- Wild parsnip, a common name for several plants including and Garden angelica and Giant hogweed
  - Giant cow parsnip, commonly known as giant hogweed, also known as cartwheel-flower, giant cow parsley,or hogsbane
- Woollyhead parsnip, also known as anger's buttons, button parsley, and swamp white heads

Parsnip may also refer to:

- Parsnip (band), an Australian rock band
- Operation Parsnip, a World War II operation by the Netherlands East Indies Forces Intelligence Service on the island of Java
- Parsnip Moth, or parsnip webworm is a moth of the family Depressariidae

== See also ==
- Parsnip Peak Wilderness, a 43,693-acre (17,682 ha) wilderness in northeastern Lincoln County, Nevada
- Parsnip River, a 240-kilometre (150 mi) long river in central British Columbia, Canada
- Parsnip swallowtail, a butterfly found throughout much of North America
- Parsnip Swamp, a swamp in the U.S. state of Washington
- Parsnip yam, a species of true yam in the yam family, Dioscoreaceae
