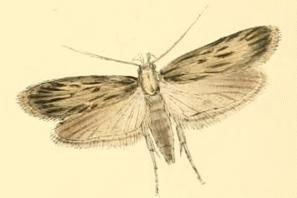

Scientific classification
- Kingdom: Animalia
- Phylum: Arthropoda
- Clade: Pancrustacea
- Class: Insecta
- Order: Lepidoptera
- Family: Depressariidae
- Genus: Depressaria
- Species: D. ultimella

Binomial name
- Depressaria ultimella Stainton, 1849

= Depressaria ultimella =

Species of moth

Depressaria ultimella is a moth of the family Depressariidae. It is found in most of Europe, except Spain, Norway, Finland, Lithuania, Switzerland, Italy and most of the Balkan Peninsula.

The wingspan is 17–21 mm. The terminal joint of palpi with two blackish bands. Forewings light reddish-fuscous, more or less sprinkled with ochreous-whitish; numerous dark fuscous dashes; two indicating discal stigmata, connected by a line of whitish scales; an obscure pale acutely angulated fascia about 3/4. Hindwings fuscous-whitish, more fuscous posteriorly; 5 separate. The larva is pale green; dots dark brown; head pale brownish.

Adults are on wing from August to (after overwintering) the following spring.

The larvae feed on Oenanthe, Sium, Berula and Apium nodiflorum.
