= Admiral Jellico =

Admiral Jellico may refer to:

- Edward Jellico, fictional character from Star Trek, who carried the rank of Admiral in Star Trek: Prodigy
- John Jellicoe, 1st Earl Jellicoe, UK Royal Navy admiral; misspelling of "Admiral Jellicoe"

== See also ==
- Jellicoe (disambiguation)
- Jellico (disambiguation)
