= Wild parsnip =

Wild parsnip is a common name for several plants and may refer to:

- Wild parsnip (Pastinaca sativa), is a Eurasian weed with edible root but toxic sap in the leaves and stems
- Garden angelica (wild celery)
- Giant hogweed (Heracleum mantegazzianum), which is extremely toxic
- Several Australian species in the genus Trachymene
  - Trachymene incisa

== See also ==
- Parsnip (disambiguation)
