= T. grandis =

T. grandis may refer to:

- Tectona grandis, the teak, a tropical hardwood tree species native to south and southeast Asia, mainly India, Indonesia, Malaysia and Myanmar
- Tenedos grandis, a spider species in the genus Tenedos
- Terataspis grandis, a huge trilobite species from the Devonian that lived in a shallow sea in what is now New York State and Ontario
- Tillandsia grandis, a synonym of Pseudalcantarea grandis, a plant species native to Mexico and Central America
- Tmarus grandis, a spider species in the genus Tmarus found in Brazil
- Toromys grandis, the giant tree rat or white-faced tree rat, a spiny rat species found in Brazil
- Trachymene grandis, a plant species in the genus Trachymene

== See also ==
- Grandis (disambiguation)
