= List of places in California (J) =

List of places in California - J

This list of current:

- cities
- towns, unincorporated communities
- counties, and other recognized places in the U.S. state of California.

Information on the number and names of counties in which the place lies, and its lower and upper ZIP Code bounds, if applicable are also included.

Name of place	Number of counties	Principal county	Lower zip code	Upper zip code
Jacinto	1	Glenn County		
Jacinto Grange	1	Glenn County	95943	
Jack McNamara Field	1	Del Norte County	95531	
Jacksnipe	1	Solano County		
Jackson	1	Amador County	95642	
Jackson Gate	1	Amador County	95642	
Jackson Rancheria	1	Amador County	95642	
Jacksonville	1	Tuolumne County	95309	
Jacumba	1	San Diego County	91934	
Jalama	1	Santa Barbara County	93436	
Jamacha	1	San Diego County		
Jamacha Junction	1	San Diego County	92077	
Jamesan	1	Fresno County		
Jamesburg	1	Monterey County	93924	
Jameson Beach	1	El Dorado County	95731	
Jamestown	1	Tuolumne County	95327	
Jamul	1	San Diego County	91935	
Jamul Village	1	San Diego County		
Janesville	1	Lassen County	96114	
Janney	1	San Joaquin County		
Jarbo	1	Butte County	95965	
Jarvis Landing	1	Alameda County		
Jasmin	1	Kern County		
Jastro	1	Kern County		
Java	1	San Bernardino County		
Jaybee	1	San Bernardino County		
Jefferson	1	Los Angeles County		
Jellico	1	Lassen County		
Jelly	1	Tehama County	96080	
Jenner	1	Sonoma County	95450	
Jenny Lind	1	Calaveras County	95252	
Jensen Spur	1	Mendocino County		
Jerome	1	Siskiyou County		
Jersey	1	Contra Costa County		
Jerseydale	1	Mariposa County		
Jesmond Dene	1	San Diego County	92025	
Jesus Maria	1	Calaveras County		
Jet	1	Stanislaus County		
Jet Propulsion Laboratory	1	Los Angeles County		
Jewell	1	Marin County		
Jewett	1	Imperial County		
Jimgrey	1	San Bernardino County		
Jimtown	1	Sonoma County	95448	
Jofegan	1	San Diego County		
Johannesburg	1	Kern County	93528	
John Adams	1	San Diego County	92116	
John Muir National Historic Site	1	Marin County	94553	
Johnsondale	1	Tulare County	93238	
Johnson Park	1	Shasta County	96013	
Johnsons	1	Humboldt County		
Johnson Tract	1	Tulare County	93291	
Johnson Valley	1	San Bernardino County	92285	
Johnston	1	Sacramento County		
Johnstons Corner	1	San Bernardino County		
Johnstonville	1	Lassen County	96130	
Johnstown	1	San Diego County	92020	
Johnsville	1	Plumas County	96103	
John Wayne-Orange County Airport	1	Orange County	92707	
Joint Union High School	1	Merced County		
Jolon	1	Monterey County	93928	
Jones Corner	1	Tulare County		
Jonesville	1	Butte County	95921	
Josephine	1	Sutter County		
Joshua	1	San Bernardino County		
Joshua Tree	1	San Bernardino County	92252	
Joshua Tree National Monument	2	Riverside County	92277	
Joshua Tree National Monument	2	San Bernardino County	92277	
Jovista	1	Tulare County		
Juan	1	San Bernardino County		
Julian	1	San Diego County	92036	
Junction City	1	Trinity County	96048	
Junction Station	1	Los Angeles County		
June Lake	1	Mono County	93529	
June Lake Junction	1	Mono County	93529	
Juniper Hills	1	Los Angeles County	93543	
Juniper Lake Resort	1	Lassen County	96020	
Juniper Springs	1	Riverside County	92381	
Jupiter	1	Tuolumne County		
Jurupa Valley	1	Riverside County	91752	92509
