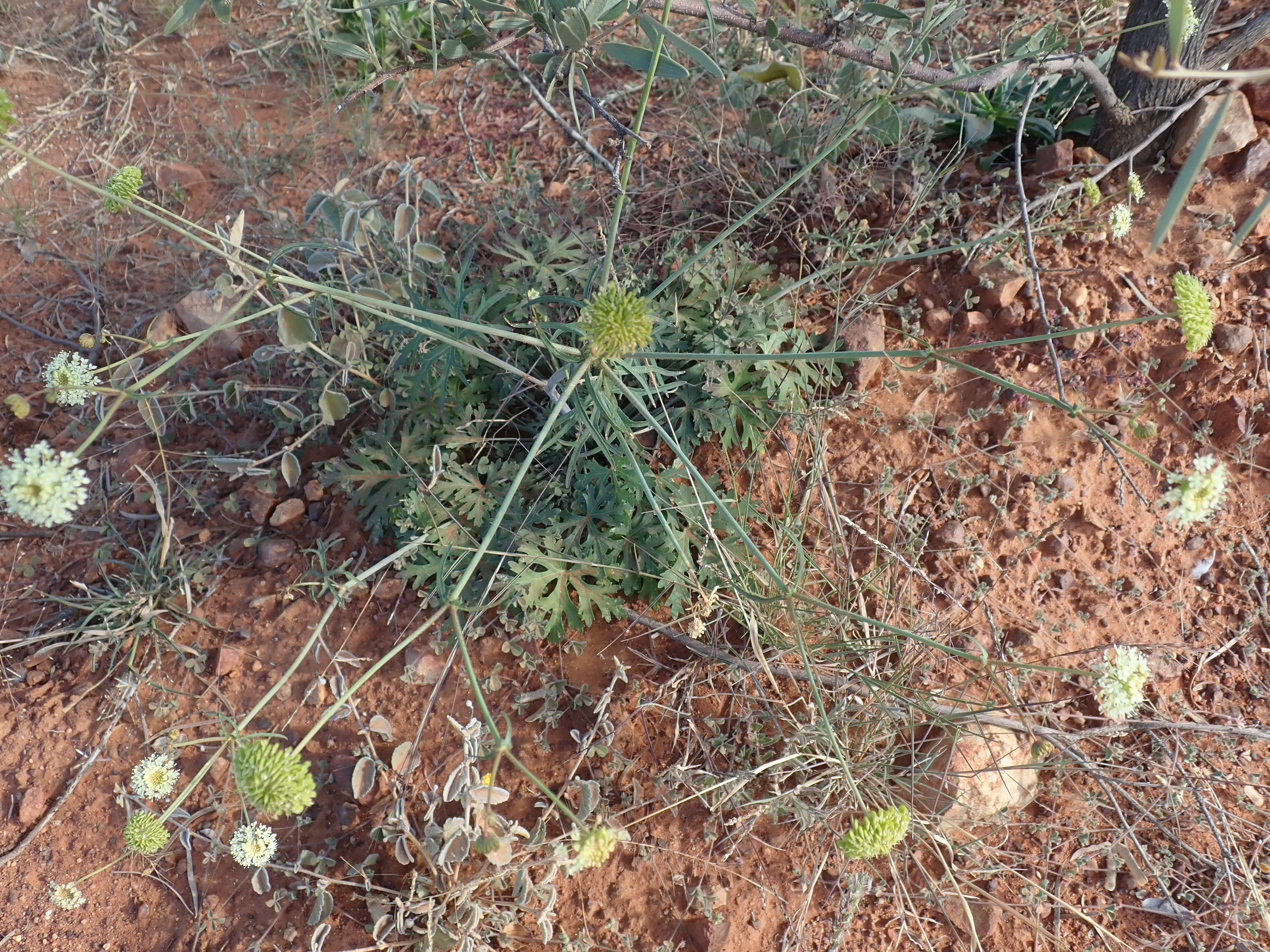

Scientific classification
- Kingdom: Plantae
- Clade: Tracheophytes
- Clade: Angiosperms
- Clade: Eudicots
- Clade: Asterids
- Order: Apiales
- Family: Araliaceae
- Genus: Trachymene
- Species: T. ochracea

Binomial name
- Trachymene ochracea L.A.S.Johnson

= Trachymene ochracea =

Species of plant

Trachymene ochracea (common names white parsnip, wild parsnip, yellow parsnip) is a herb in the family Araliaceae. It is native to Australia and found in New South Wales and Queensland.

== Description ==
Trachymene ochracea is an erect herb growing up to 75 centimetres (30 in) high. The leaves are consist of 3-5 deeply dissected lobes on stalks (petioles) up to 10 cm long. The inflorescences are umbels borne on dichasial cymes. The umbels have 30 to 60 flowers, are from 7 mm to 18 mm in diameter on stalks (peduncles) which are 3 to 8 cm long and are glandular-hairy near the stalk base. The flowers are bisexual, with white petals (pink in bud). The ovary has two locules.

The plant is prolific after rain, growing in mulga and mallee communities on red earths and on sand.

== Taxonomy ==
Trachymene ochracea was first described by Lawrence Alexander Sidney Johnson in 1962, from a specimen collected west of the Paroo River, in New South Wales, near Hungerford by J.L. Boorman in October 1912 (NSW 54006).

== Etymology ==
The species epithet, ochracea, is the Latin adjective, ochraceus,-a,-um which means "ovhre-yellow" or "yellowish-brown".

== Gallery ==
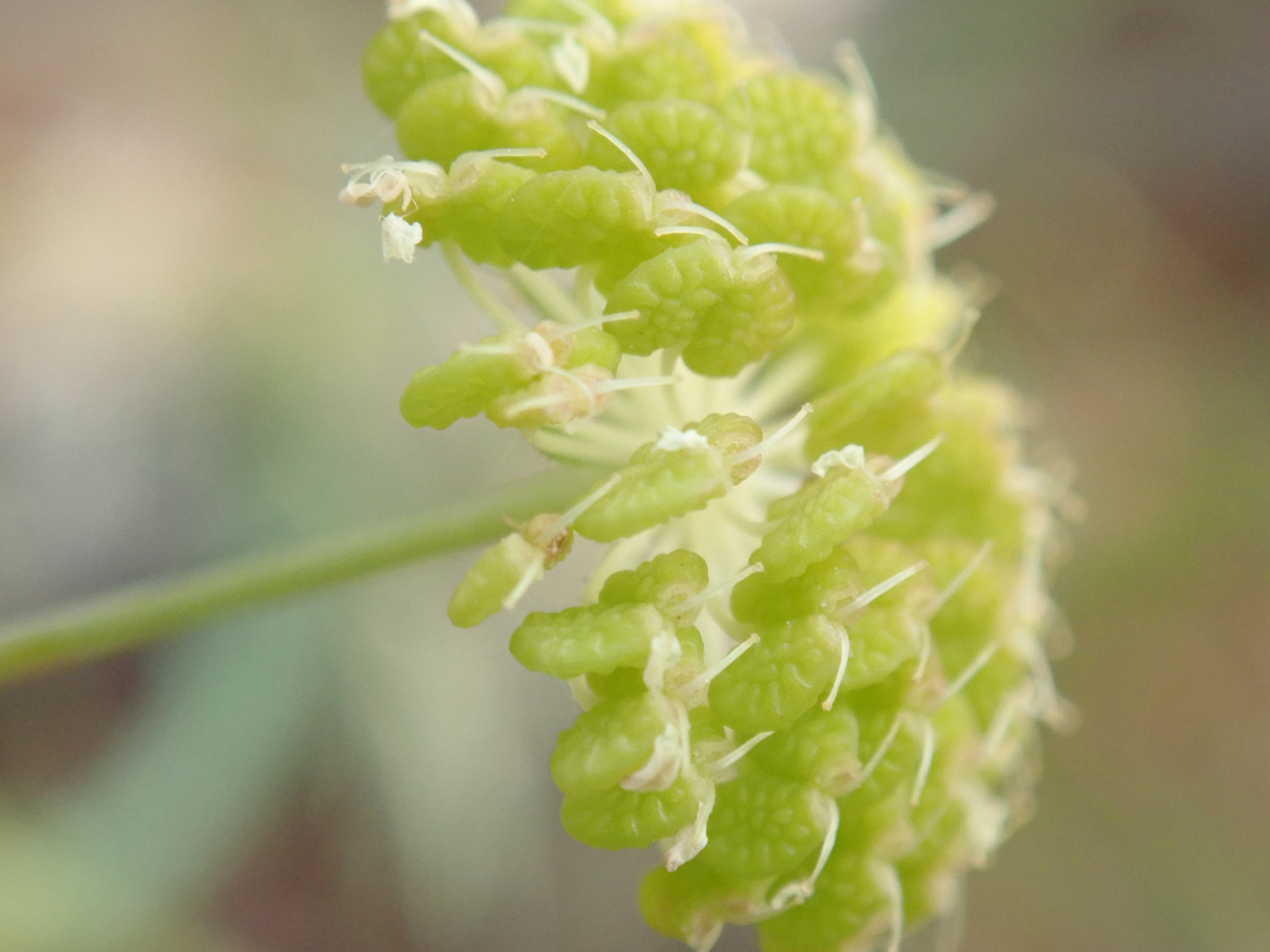
Fruit

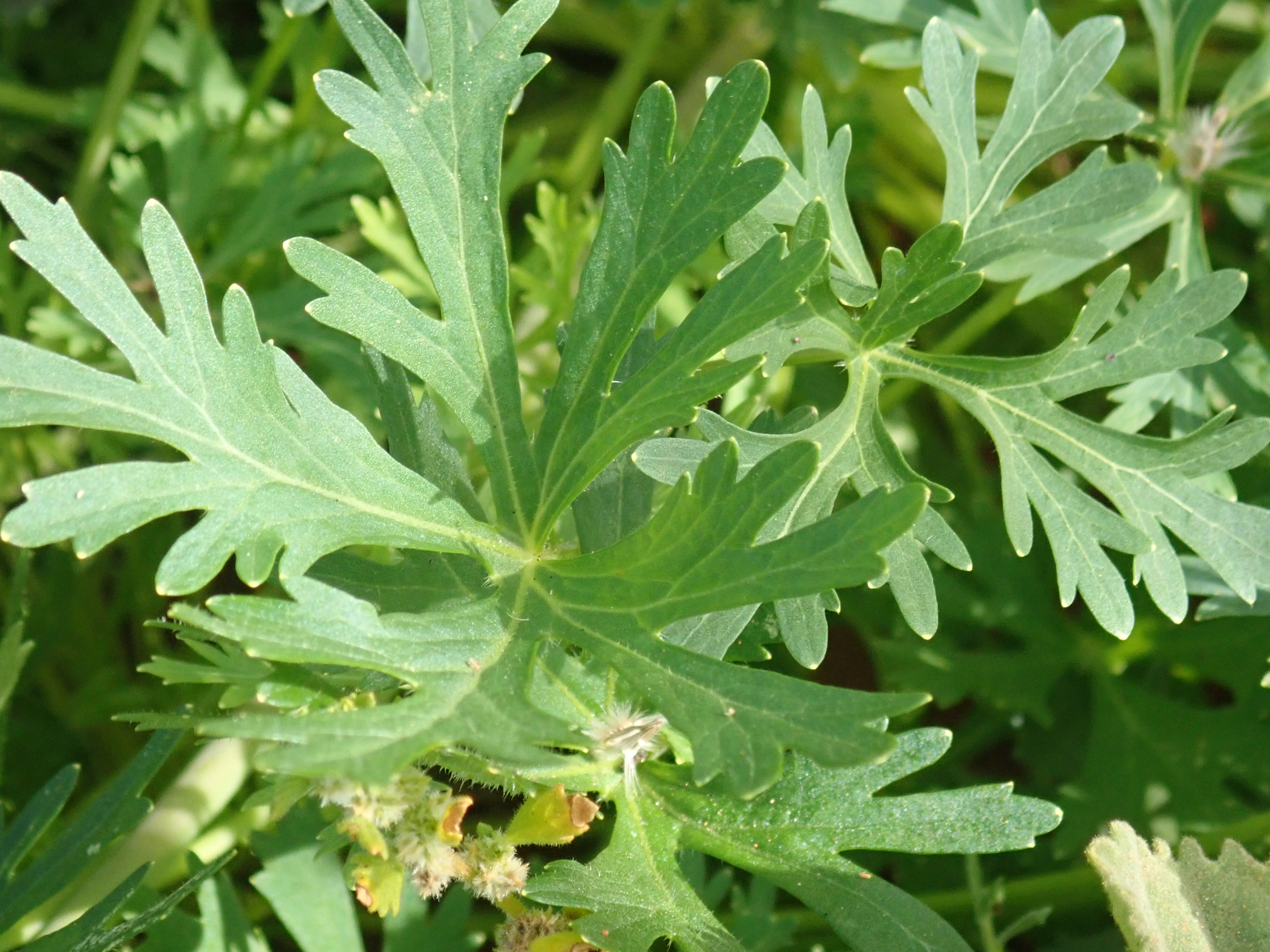
leaves

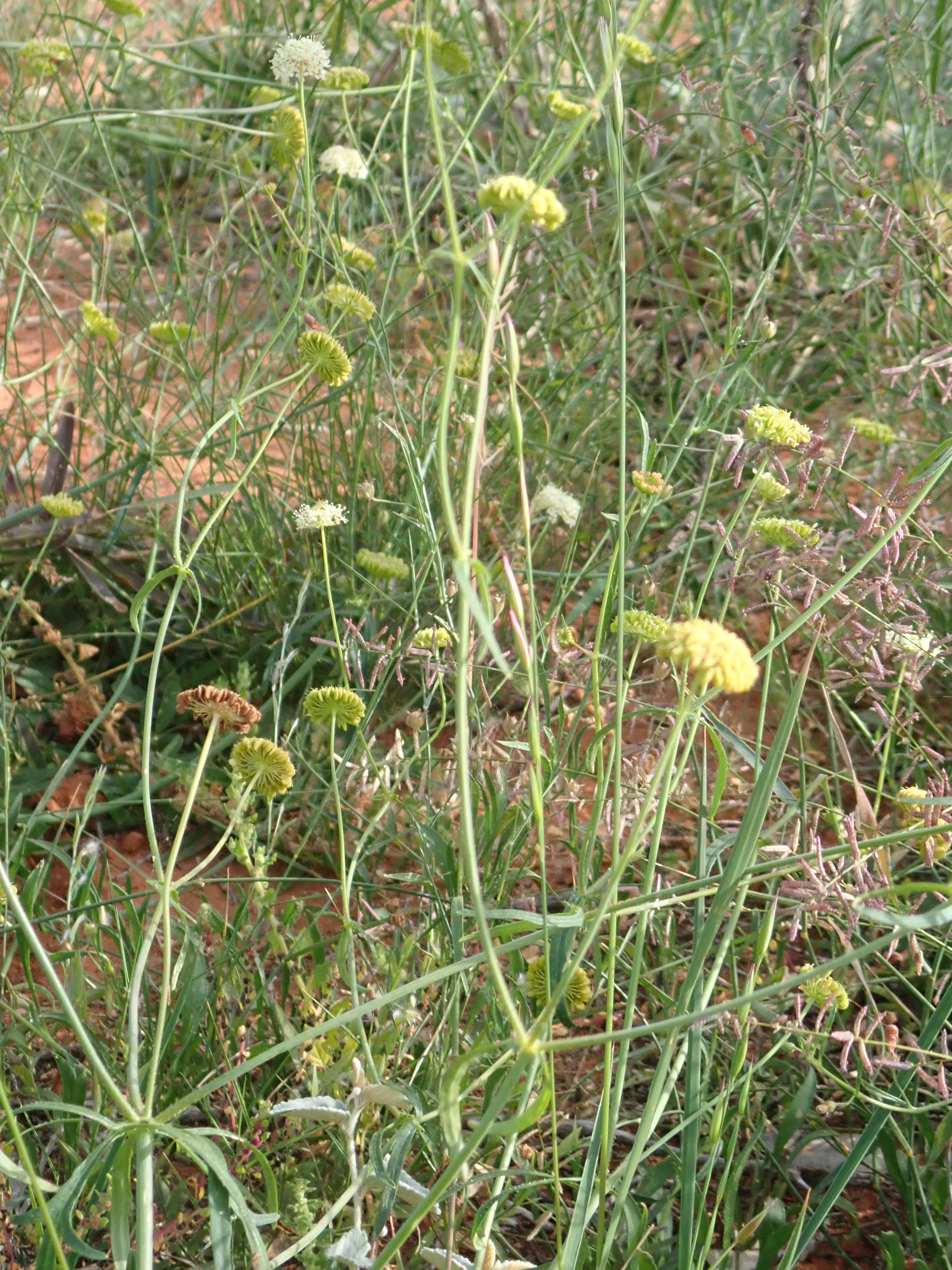
plant

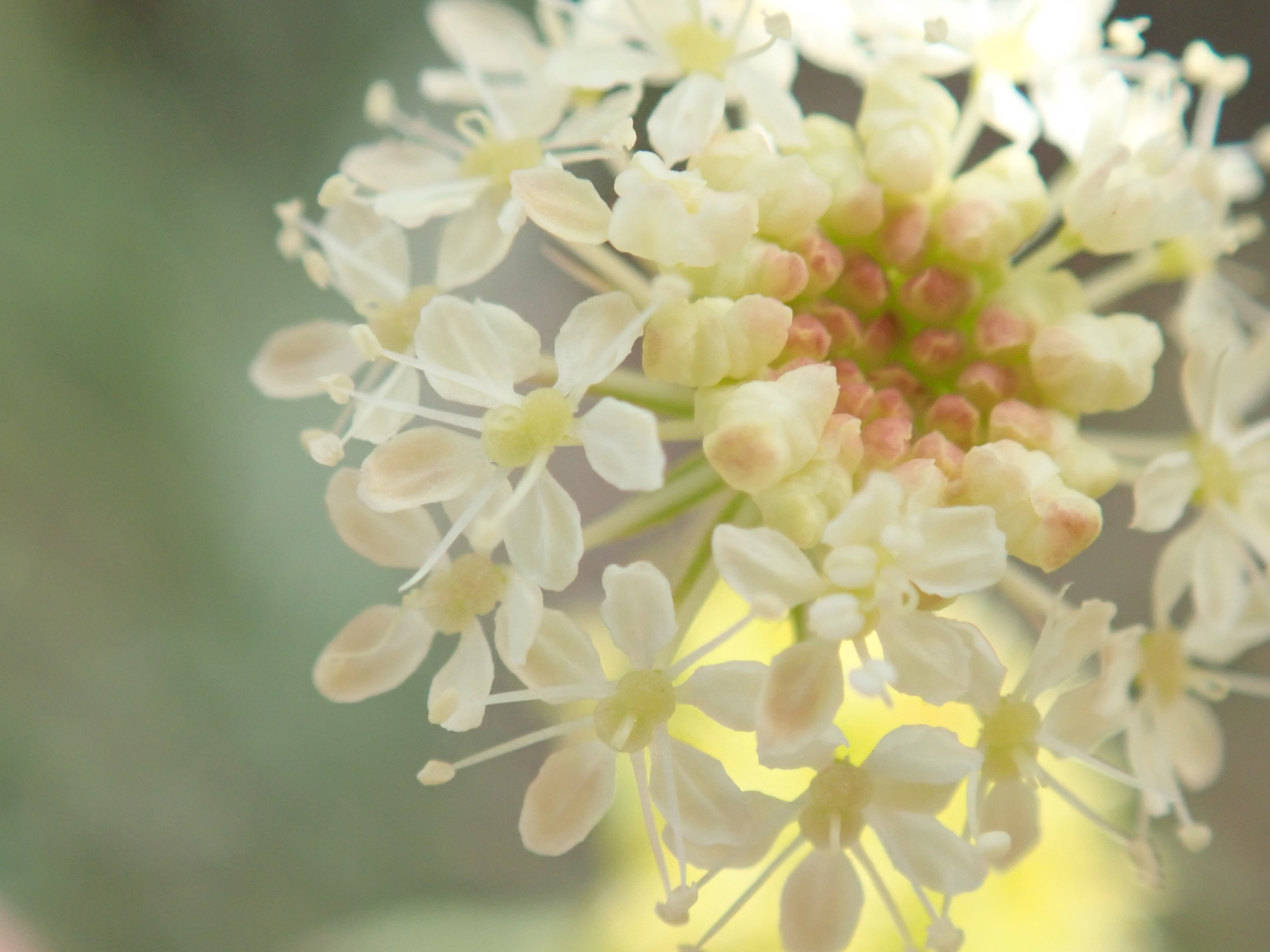
flower head
