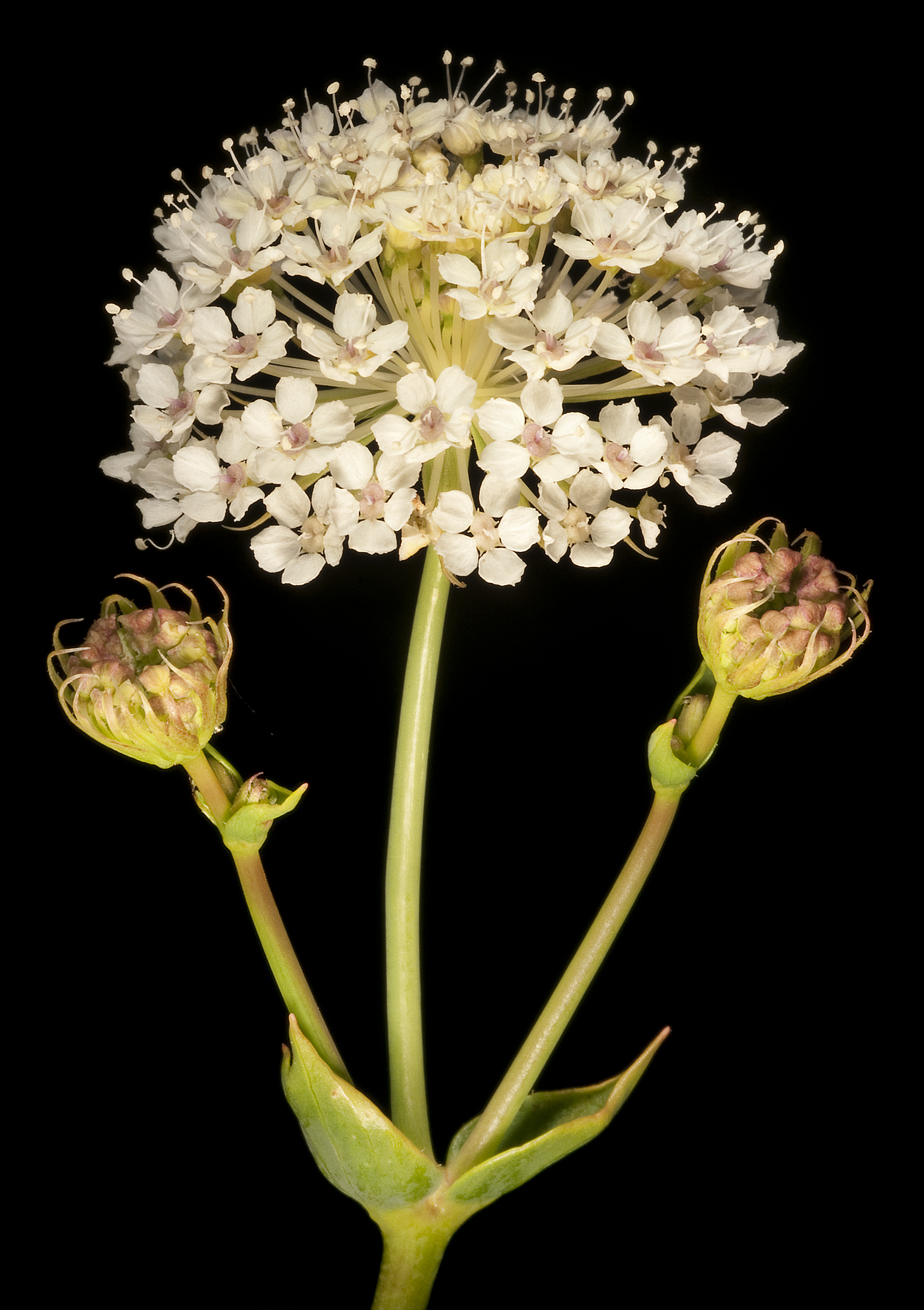

Scientific classification
- Kingdom: Plantae
- Clade: Tracheophytes
- Clade: Angiosperms
- Clade: Eudicots
- Clade: Asterids
- Order: Apiales
- Family: Araliaceae
- Genus: Trachymene
- Species: T. oleracea

Binomial name
- Trachymene oleracea (Domin) B.L.Burtt

= Trachymene oleracea =

Species of flowering plant

Trachymene oleracea is a flowering plant in the family Araliaceae and is endemic to Western Australia. It is an upright herb with blue, pink or white flowers.

== Description ==
Trachymene oleracea is an upright biennial or annual herb, 0.15–1.5 m (5.9 in – 4 ft 11.1 in) high, leaves wider and rounded at the tip, tapering to a point at the base, fine hairs and a petiole 20–60 mm (0.79–2.36 in) long. The flowers are an umbel consisting of 50-110 flowers, 10–30 mm (0.39–1.18 in) in diameter, pedicel 1–12 mm (0.039–0.472 in) long, petals mostly tinged blue to purple on undersurface, white or occasionally light blue on upper surface and 1.4–1.7 mm (0.055–0.067 in) long. Flowering occurs in March or May to October and the fruit is a warty monocarp.

== Taxonomy and naming ==
This species was described in 1928 by Karel Domin who gave it the name Didiscus oleraceus. In 1941 B.L.Burtt changed the name to Trachymene oleracea and the description was published in Journal of Botany, British and Foreign .

== Distribution and habitat ==
This species of Trachymene grows in a variety of situations including stony and sandy soils, rocky hills, watercourses and dry lake beds in Western Australia.
