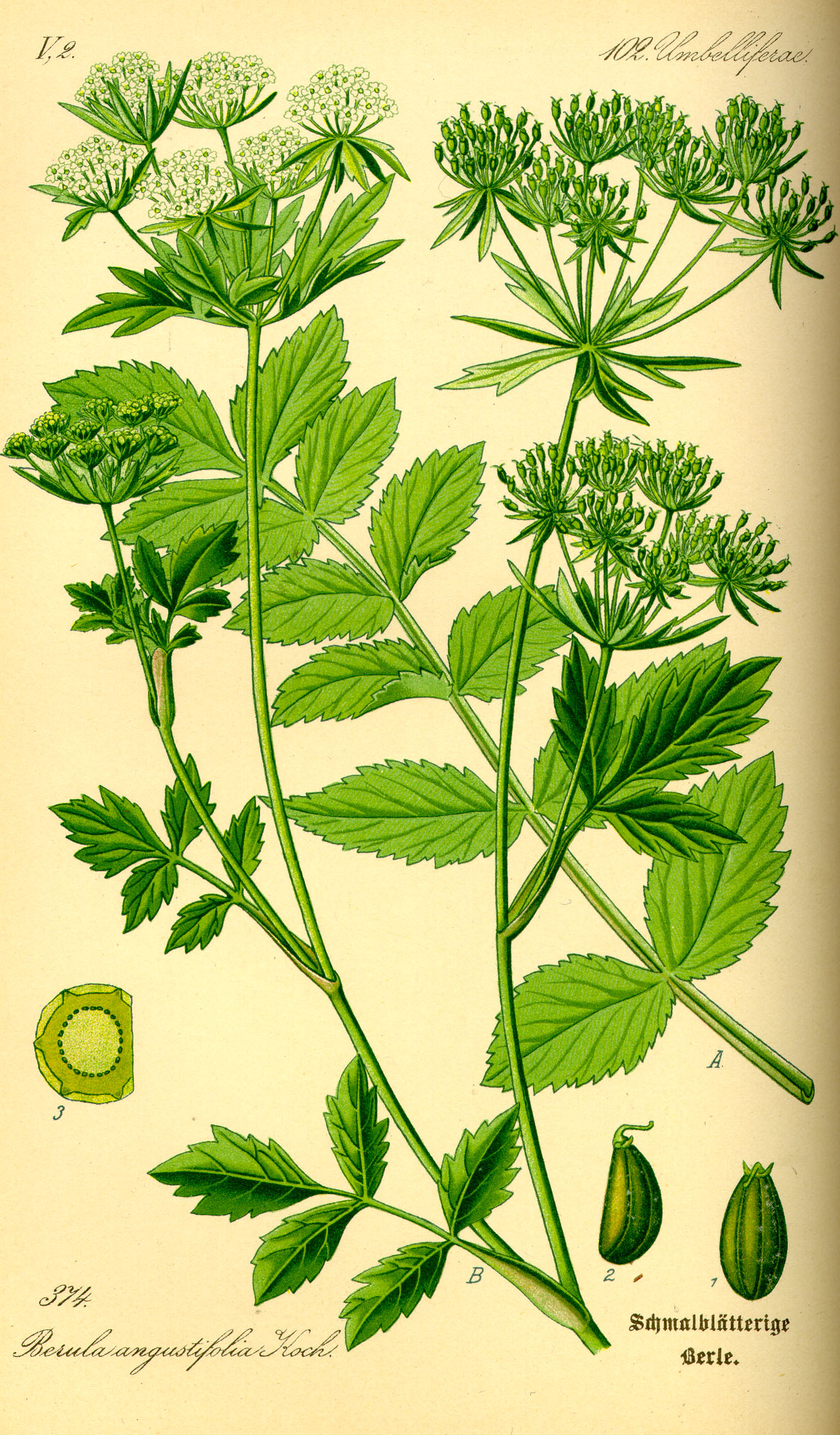
- Berula erecta

Scientific classification
- Kingdom: Plantae
- Clade: Embryophytes
- Clade: Tracheophytes
- Clade: Angiosperms
- Clade: Eudicots
- Clade: Asterids
- Order: Apiales
- Family: Apiaceae
- Subfamily: Apioideae
- Tribe: Oenantheae
- Genus: Berula; W.D.J.Koch

Synonyms
- Afrocarum Rauschert; Baumiella H.Wolff, nom. illeg. homonym. post.; Berla Bubani; Siella Pimenov, nom. illeg. superfl.

= Berula =

Genus of plants

Berula is a cosmopolitan genus of flowering plants in the family Apiaceae, whose species are known as water parsnips, as are some other plants in Apiaceae such as Sium latifolium and Sium suave. It is easily confused with the highly toxic water hemlock (Cicuta maculata).

Berula species are perennial, aquatic to semi-aquatic, herbaceous plants. The leaves are usually oppositely arranged. The flowerheads are arranged in umbels of small white flowers. Berula erecta is a widespread aquatic plant with fern-like leaves, found across Eurasia, Africa, North America, and elsewhere.

== Taxonomy ==
As of June 2026, Plants of the World Online accepts seven species:

- Berula bracteata (Roxb.) Spalik & S.R.Downie
- Berula burchellii (Hook.f.) Spalik & S.R.Downie
- Berula erecta (Huds.) Coville
- Berula imbricata (Schinz) Spalik & S.R.Downie
- Berula incisa (Torr.) G.N.Jones
- Berula repanda (Welw. ex Hiern) Spalik & S.R.Downie
- Berula thunbergii (DC.) H.Wolff
