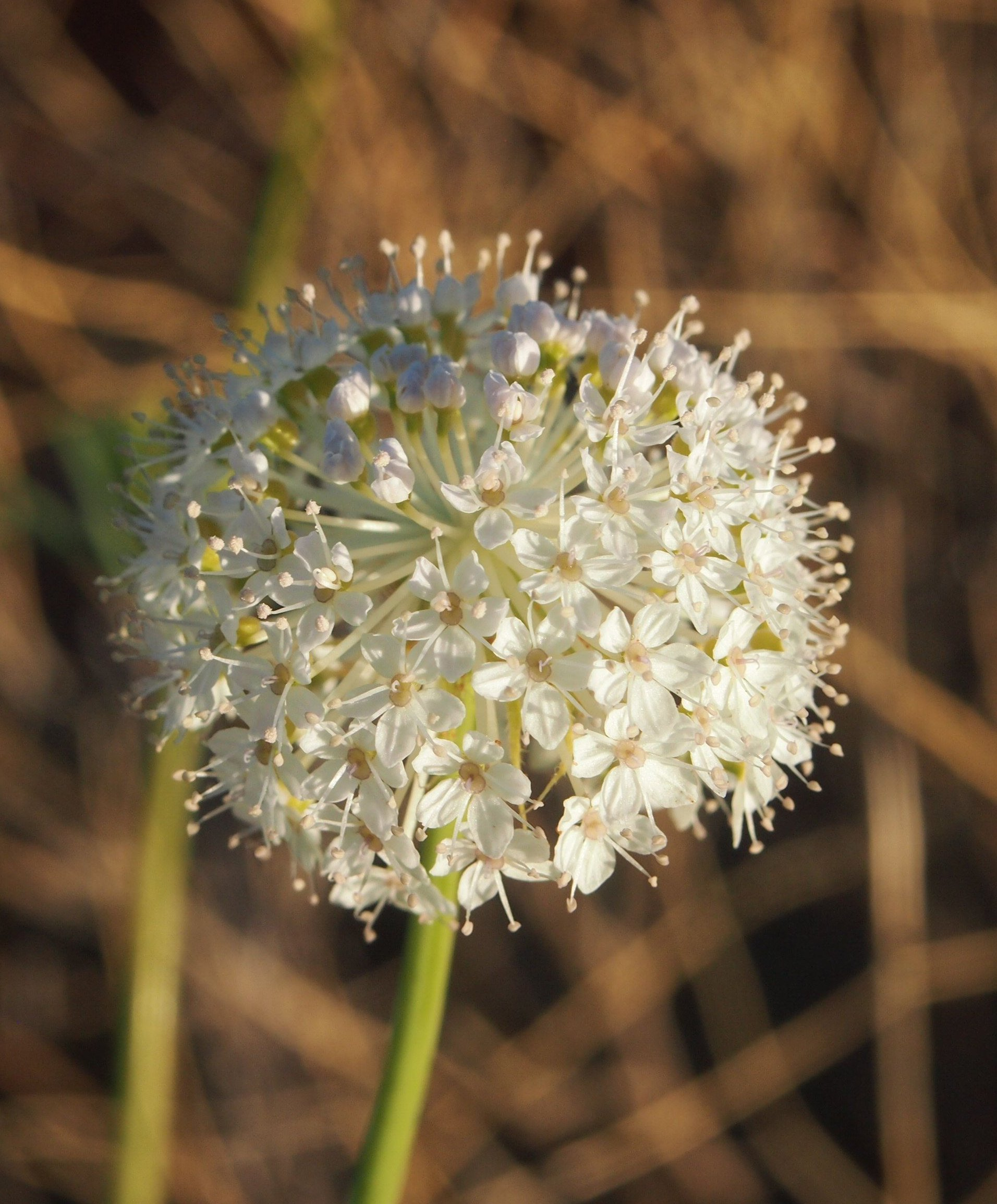
- Flowers

Scientific classification
- Kingdom: Plantae
- Clade: Tracheophytes
- Clade: Angiosperms
- Clade: Eudicots
- Clade: Asterids
- Order: Apiales
- Family: Araliaceae
- Genus: Trachymene
- Species: T. glaucifolia

Binomial name
- Trachymene glaucifolia (F.Muell)Benth.

= Trachymene glaucifolia =

Wild carrot

Species of flowering plant

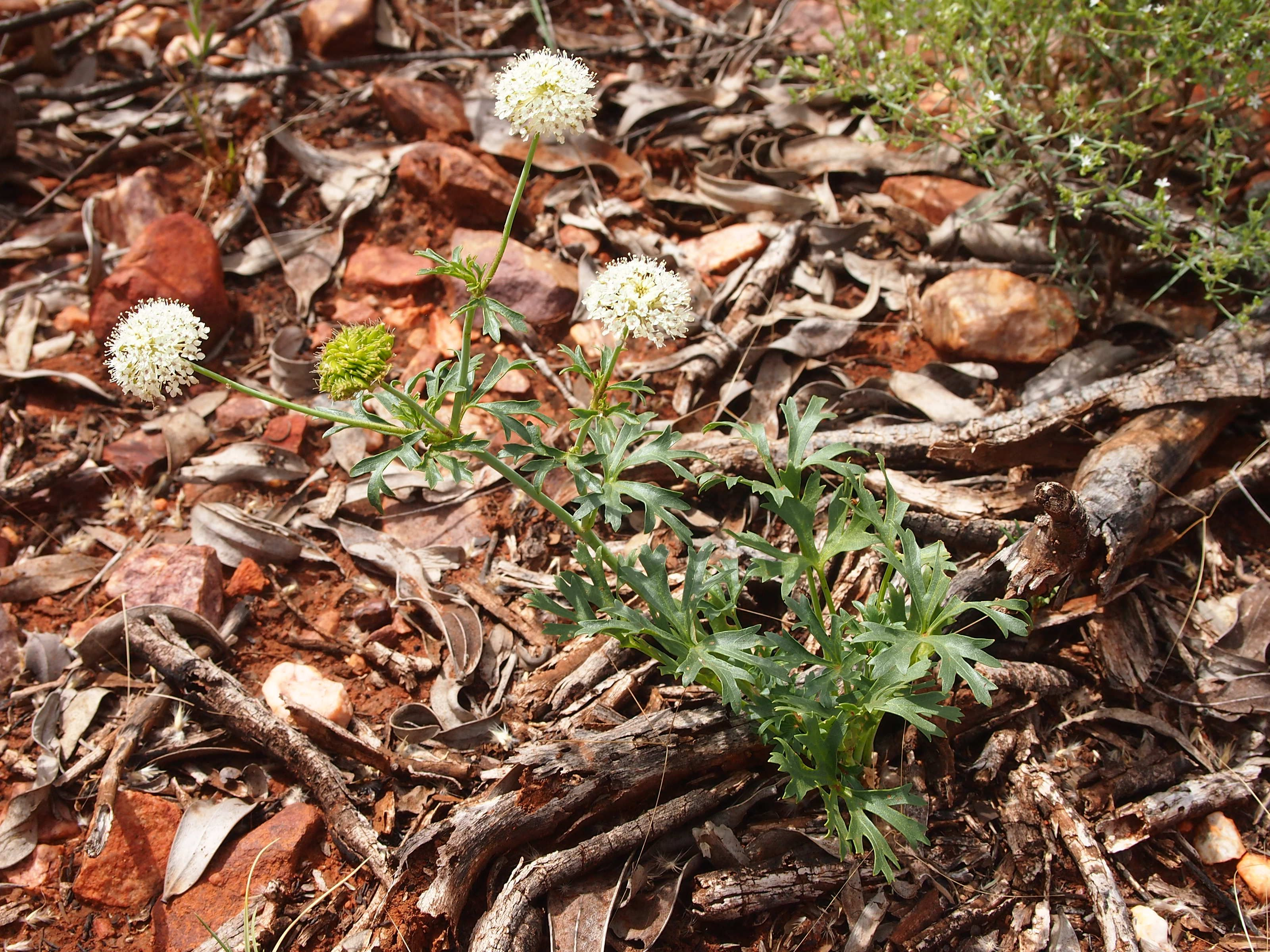
Habit

Trachymene glaucifolia commonly known as native carrot, is a flowering plant in the family Araliaceae and is endemic to Australia. It is an annual forb with white or bluish flowers on an upright stem.

== Description ==
Trachymene glaucifolia is an upright, annual herb to 60 cm (24 in) high, stems with few branches and smooth. The leaves usually near the base, dissected or with 3-5 lobes, egg-shaped in outline, 2–5 cm (0.79–1.97 in) long, 3–5 cm (1.2–2.0 in) wide, smooth or with occasional hairs and the petiole about 3.5–10.5 cm (1.4–4.1 in) long. The 80-120 flowers are in an umbel, 10–25 mm (0.39–0.98 in) in diameter, petals 1.6–1.9 mm (0.063–0.075 in) long, bluish becoming white and the peduncle 2–12 cm (0.79–4.72 in) long. Flowering occurs from August to October and the fruit is a semicircular mericarp, brown, 4.5–5.5 mm (0.18–0.22 in) long and 3.9–5.5 mm (0.15–0.22 in) wide.

== Taxonomy and naming ==
Trachymene glaucifolia was first formally described in 1867 by George Bentham and the description was published in Flora Australiensis. The specific epithet (glaucifolia) is derived from the Latin words glaucus meaning "bluish-green" and folium meaning "leaf".

== Distribution and habitat ==
Native carrot grows on a variety of soil types, including gravelly plains, sand dunes, sand plains, shrubland in Queensland, South Australia, Western Australia, New South Wales and the Northern Territory.
