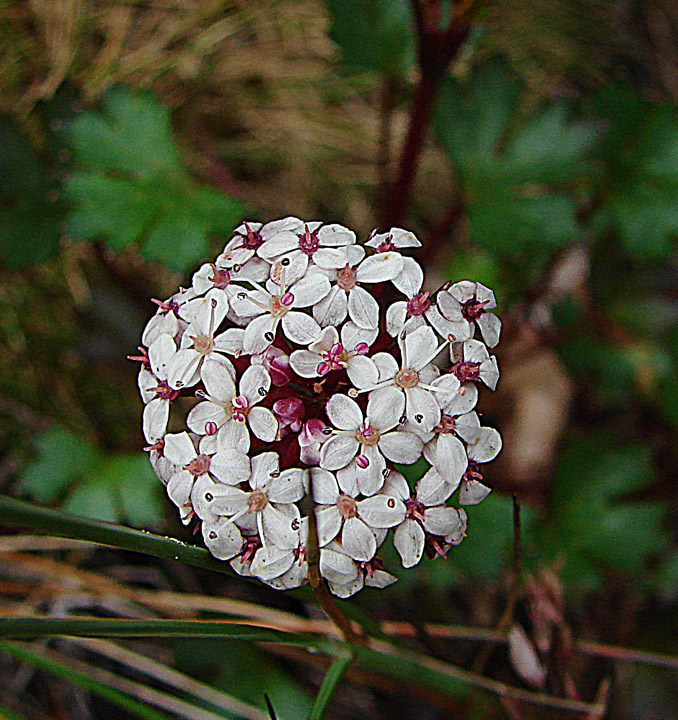
- Flowers

Conservation status
- Endangered (EPBC Act)

Scientific classification
- Kingdom: Plantae
- Clade: Tracheophytes
- Clade: Angiosperms
- Clade: Eudicots
- Clade: Asterids
- Order: Apiales
- Family: Araliaceae
- Genus: Trachymene
- Species: T. scapigera

Binomial name
- Trachymene scapigera (Domin) B.L.Burtt, 1992

Synonyms
- Didiscus scapiger Domin, 1908

= Trachymene scapigera =

Species of flowering plant

Trachymene scapigera, also known as mountain trachymene, is a species of plant in the ginseng family that is endemic to Australia.

== Description ==
The species is a robust rhizomatous perennial herb growing up to 50 cm high. The three- to five-lobed leaves form a basal rosette. Some 20–50 white to pinkish flowers are produced in an umbel borne on a 12–35 cm stem. Flowering takes place from December to March.

== Distribution and habitat ==
The species was originally known only from the type specimen collected in 1899 near the Jenolan Caves, west of Sydney. It was subsequently thought to be extinct until two adjacent populations were discovered in the 1980s along the banks of the Boyd River in Kanangra-Boyd National Park in the Central Tablelands district of New South Wales, where the plants grow on flat or gently sloping ground in the riparian zone.

== Conservation ==
The species has been listed as Endangered under Australia's EPBC Act. The main threat comes from human activities, as well as, potentially, inappropriate fire regimes and disturbance by feral pigs.
