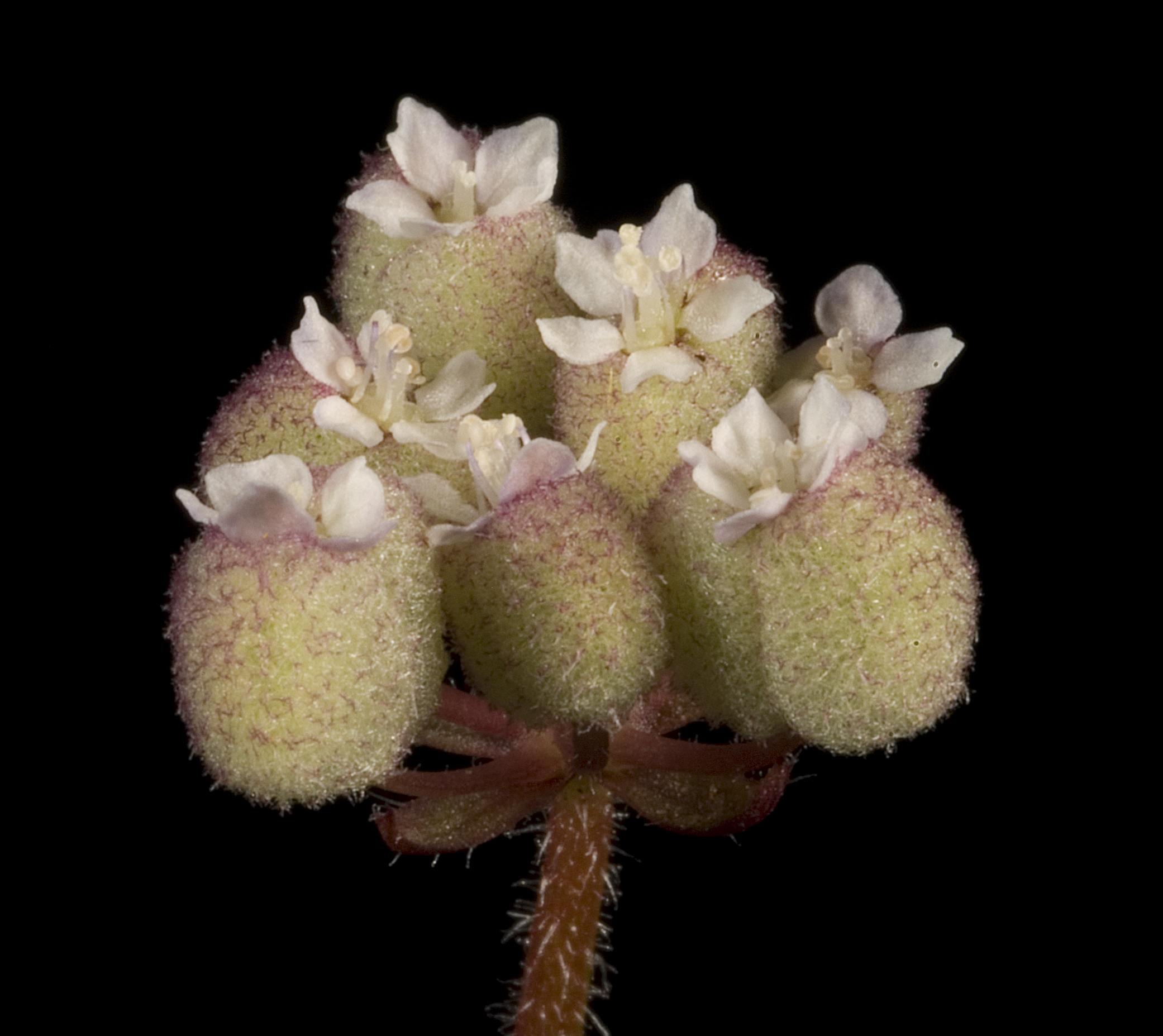

Scientific classification
- Kingdom: Plantae
- Clade: Tracheophytes
- Clade: Angiosperms
- Clade: Eudicots
- Clade: Asterids
- Order: Apiales
- Family: Araliaceae
- Genus: Trachymene
- Species: T. ornata

Binomial name
- Trachymene ornata (Endl.) Druce
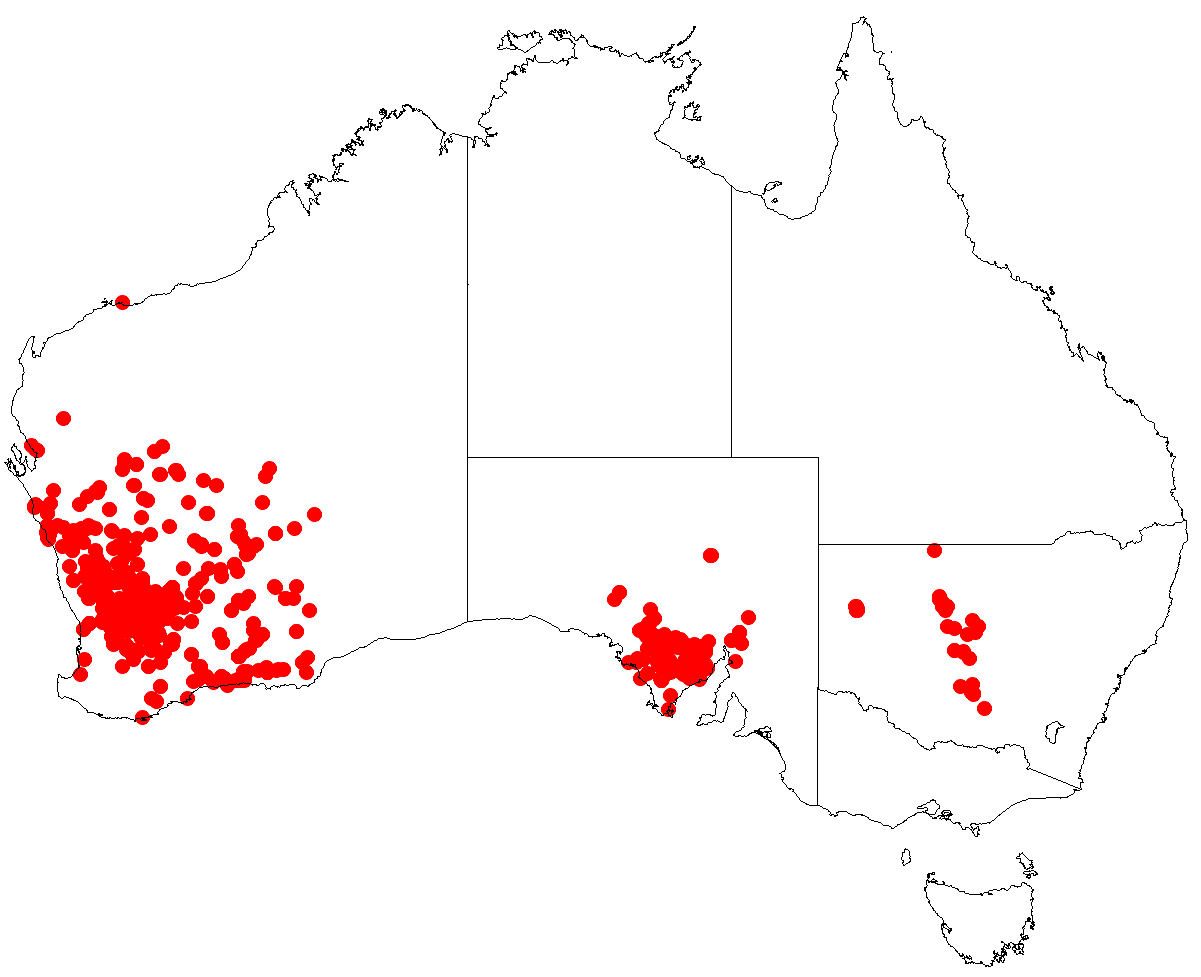
- Occurrence data from AVH

Synonyms
- Cesatia ornata Endl. Didiscus eriocarpus (F.Muell.) F.Muell. Didiscus ornatus (Endl.) Domin; Didiscus ornatus var. semilanatus J.M.Black; Dimetopia eriocarpa F.Muell. Trachymene eriocarpa (F.Muell.) Benth. Trachymene ornata var. semilanata (J.M.Black) H.Eichler

= Trachymene ornata =

Species of plant

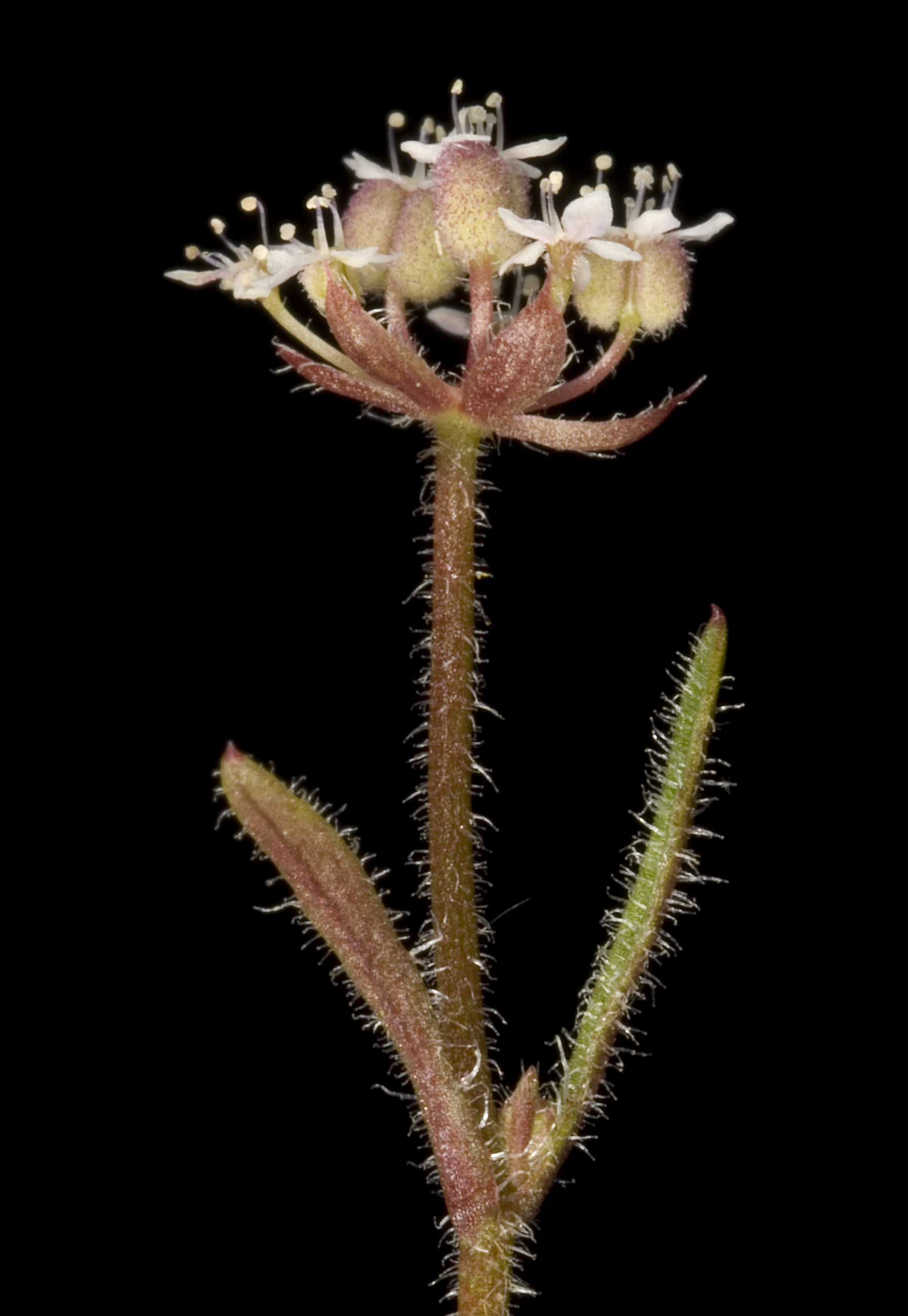
Trachymene ornata

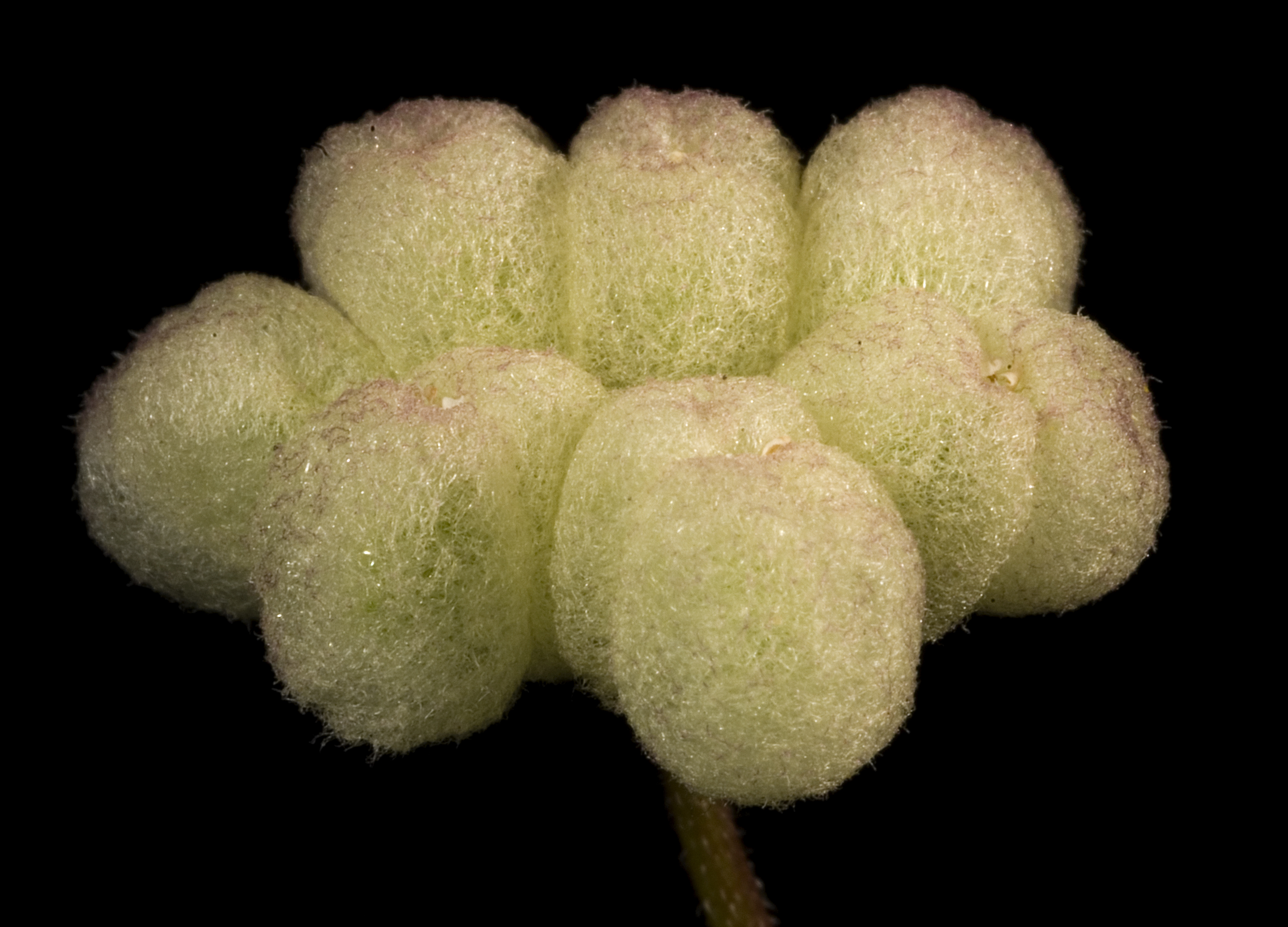
Trachymene ornata fruit

Trachymene ornata, or spongefruit, is a slender annual herb in the family Araliaceae. It is native to Australia and found in Western Australia, South Australia and New South Wales.

== Description ==
Trachymene ornata is an annual herb growing up to 15 centimetres (6 in) high, which has sparsely hairy stems. The sparsely hairy leaves are deeply three-lobed almost to dissected. The inflorescence is an umbel of 3-6 flowers which are bisexual, white or blue, and observed (in NSW) from July to October. The two-carpelled fruits split into two densely woolly mericarps with white (sometimes purplish) hairs.

== Habitat ==
It grows in rocky places, and in shallow soils

== Taxonomy ==
Trachymene ornata was first described by Stephan Endlicher in 1839, and redescribed by Druce in 1917 as belonging to the genus, Trachymene Rudge.
