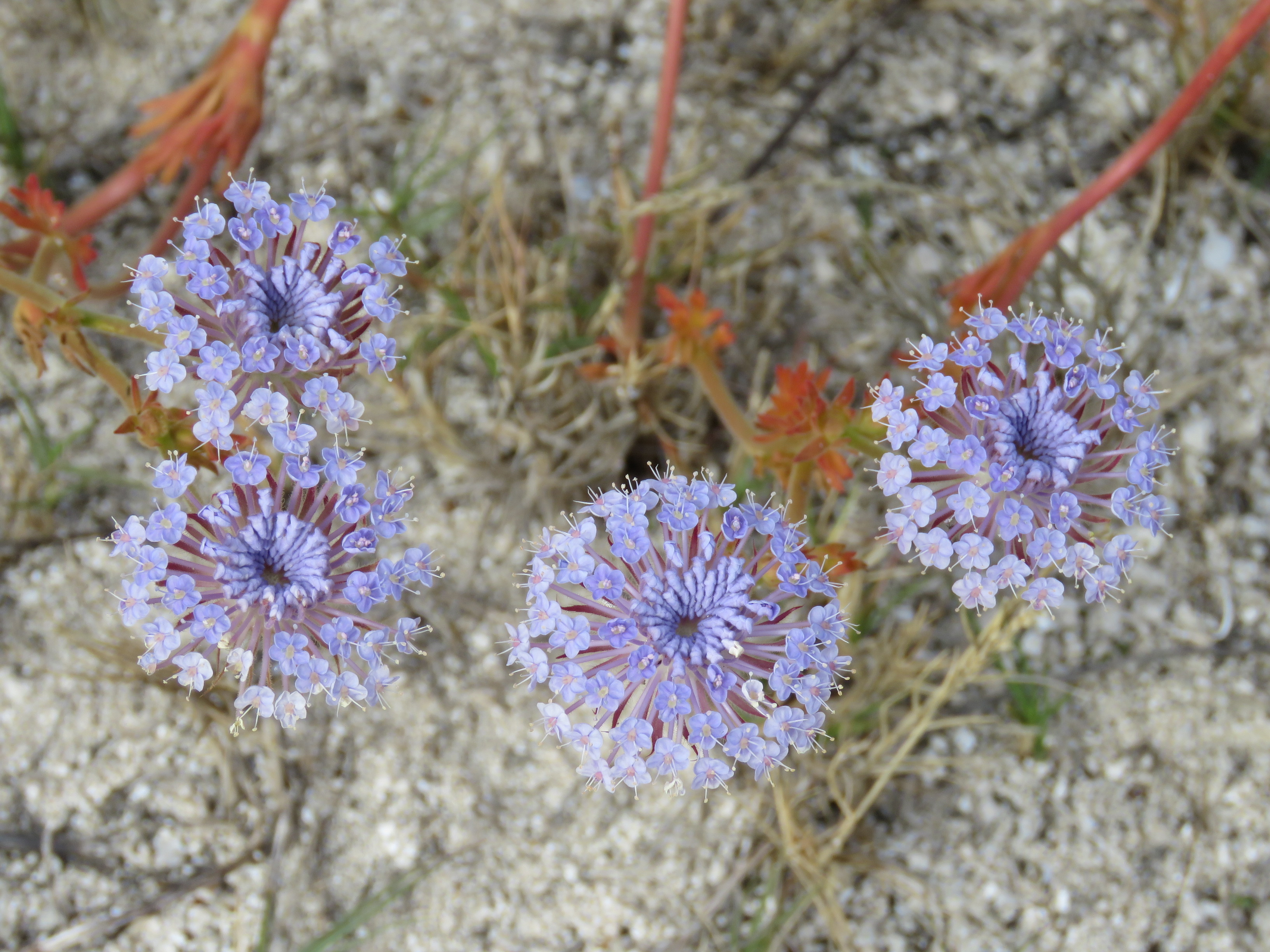
- Trachymene coerulea at Lake Walyungup, Rockingham Lakes Regional Park

Scientific classification
- Kingdom: Plantae
- Clade: Tracheophytes
- Clade: Angiosperms
- Clade: Eudicots
- Clade: Asterids
- Order: Apiales
- Family: Araliaceae
- Genus: Trachymene
- Species: T. coerulea

Binomial name
- Trachymene coerulea Graham

= Trachymene coerulea =

Species of plant

Trachymene coerulea (common name - blue-lace flower) is a herb in the family Araliaceae. It is native to Western Australia.

Trachymene coerulea was first described by Robert Graham in 1828, from a plant grown from seed sent to Edinburgh by Charles Fraser, the New South Wales colonial botanist.

The plant is endemic to the south-west of Western Australia. It can grow up to 1.2 meters tall, and has fan shaped leaves and clusters of blue, purple or white flower heads which each consist of 130 to 300 flowers.

== Aboriginal uses ==
Mashed bulbs and leaves were used as a body rub to relieve aches and pains. Vapours from the crushed leaves were inhaled for headaches.
