= Jofegan, California =

Abandoned settlement in San Diego, California

Coordinates: 33.315064°N 117.332059°W

Jofegan is an abandoned settlement in California. It is named after General Joseph Fegan, who was a commander at Camp Pendleton. The settlement predates the O'Neill Ranch at the center of the Marine Corps Base Camp Pendleton in San Diego County, California, United States. It is adjacent to an out-of-use railroad to the West of Vandegrift Boulevard, and South of Lake O'Neill.
