= Jellicoe =

Jellicoe may refer to:

== People ==
- John Jellicoe Blair, RAF pilot during WWII
- Ann Jellicoe (1927–2017), British actress, theatre director and playwright
- Sir Geoffrey Jellicoe (1900–1996), British landscape architect
- George Jellicoe, 2nd Earl Jellicoe (1918–2007), British army officer, politician and businessman
- John Jellicoe, 1st Earl Jellicoe (1859–1935), British Royal Navy officer

== Places ==
- Jellicoe, Ontario, a village located near Lake Nipigon in Greenstone, Ontario
- Jellicoe Channel connecting the Hauraki Gulf with the Pacific Ocean

== Other uses ==
- Jellicoe (band), a British band
- Earl Jellicoe, a title in the Peerage of the United Kingdom

== See also ==
- Jellico (disambiguation)
