= Operation Parsnip =

- Part of Pacific War of World War II
Date	6–8 June 1945
Location	Mandalika coast, northern Java
Result	Japanese victory

Belligerents
Netherlands; Australia	Empire of Japan

Commanders and leaders
Lt. Abimanjoe	Unknown

Strength
Unknown	Unknown

Casualties and losses
5 killed	Unknown

Operation Parsnip was a World War II operation by the Netherlands East Indies Forces Intelligence Service on the island of Java. Troops were landed by submarine on 6 June 1945. The party was spotted by the Japanese and picked up; two were killed.

On 6–8 June 1945, the Dutch submarine HNLMS K XV unsuccessfully tried three times to land the NEFIS shore party 'Parsnip' and supplies at the coast of Mandalika, north coast of Java. The shore party was under the command of Lt. Abimanjoe.

A Halifax Mk.II was ditched in this mission, after dropping 14 containers and a package. 3 of the crew were killed.
