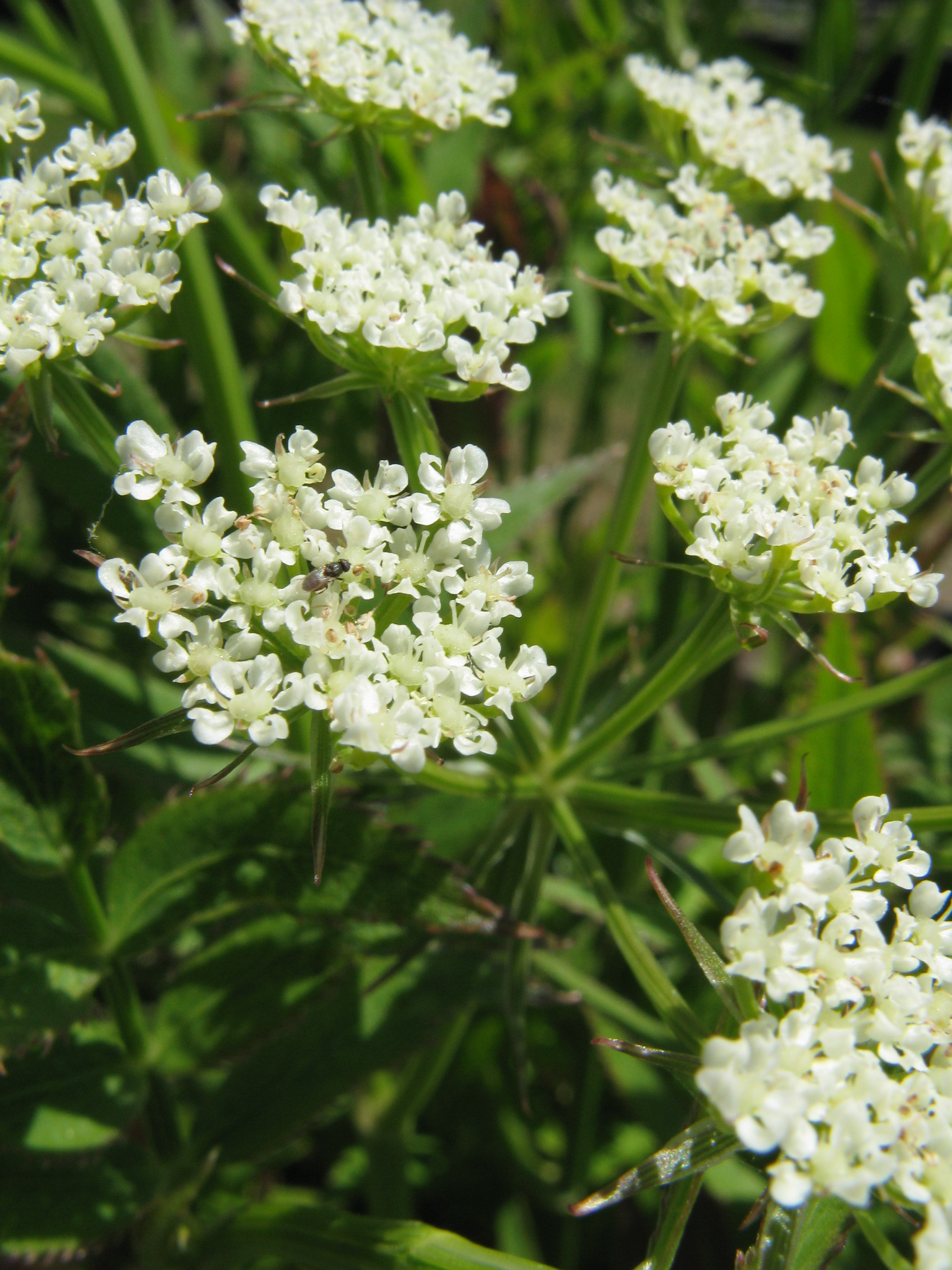
- Sium suave

Scientific classification
- Kingdom: Plantae
- Clade: Embryophytes
- Clade: Tracheophytes
- Clade: Spermatophytes
- Clade: Angiosperms
- Clade: Eudicots
- Clade: Asterids
- Order: Apiales
- Family: Apiaceae
- Subfamily: Apioideae
- Tribe: Oenantheae
- Genus: Sium; L.

Synonyms
- Sion Adans.; Sisarum Bubani, nom. illeg.; Sisarum Daubenton; Siumis Raf.

= Sium =

Genus of flowering plants

Sium is a genus of flowering plants in the family Apiaceae. It is widely distributed across Europe, Asia, Africa, and North America. Plants of this genus are commonly called water parsnips.

These are perennial herbs, including some fully aquatic plants and some species that grow near water. The branching stem roots at the nodes. The lower leaves are pinnate, divided into leaflets. They are borne on petioles that sheath the stem at their bases. The inflorescence is a compound umbel of flowers with white petals.

== Species ==
Ten species are accepted:

- Sium crispulifolium (H.Boissieu) Jing Zhou
- Sium latifolium L. – wideleaf water parsnip, great water parsnip
- Sium latijugum C.B.Clarke
- Sium medium Fisch. & C.A.Mey.
- Sium ninsi L.
- Sium serra (Franch. & Sav.) Kitag.
- Sium sisarum L. – skirret
- Sium suave Walter – common water parsnip, hemlock water parsnip
- Sium tenue (Kom.) Kom.
- Sium ventricosum (H.Boissieu) Li S.Wang & M.F.Watson

=== Formerly placed here ===
- Berula bracteata (Roxb.) Spalik & S.R.Downie (as Sium bracteatum (Roxb.) Cronk) – jellico, large jellico
- Berula burchellii (Hook.f.) Spalik & S.R.Downie (as Sium burchellii (Hook.f.) Hemsl.) – dwarf jellico
