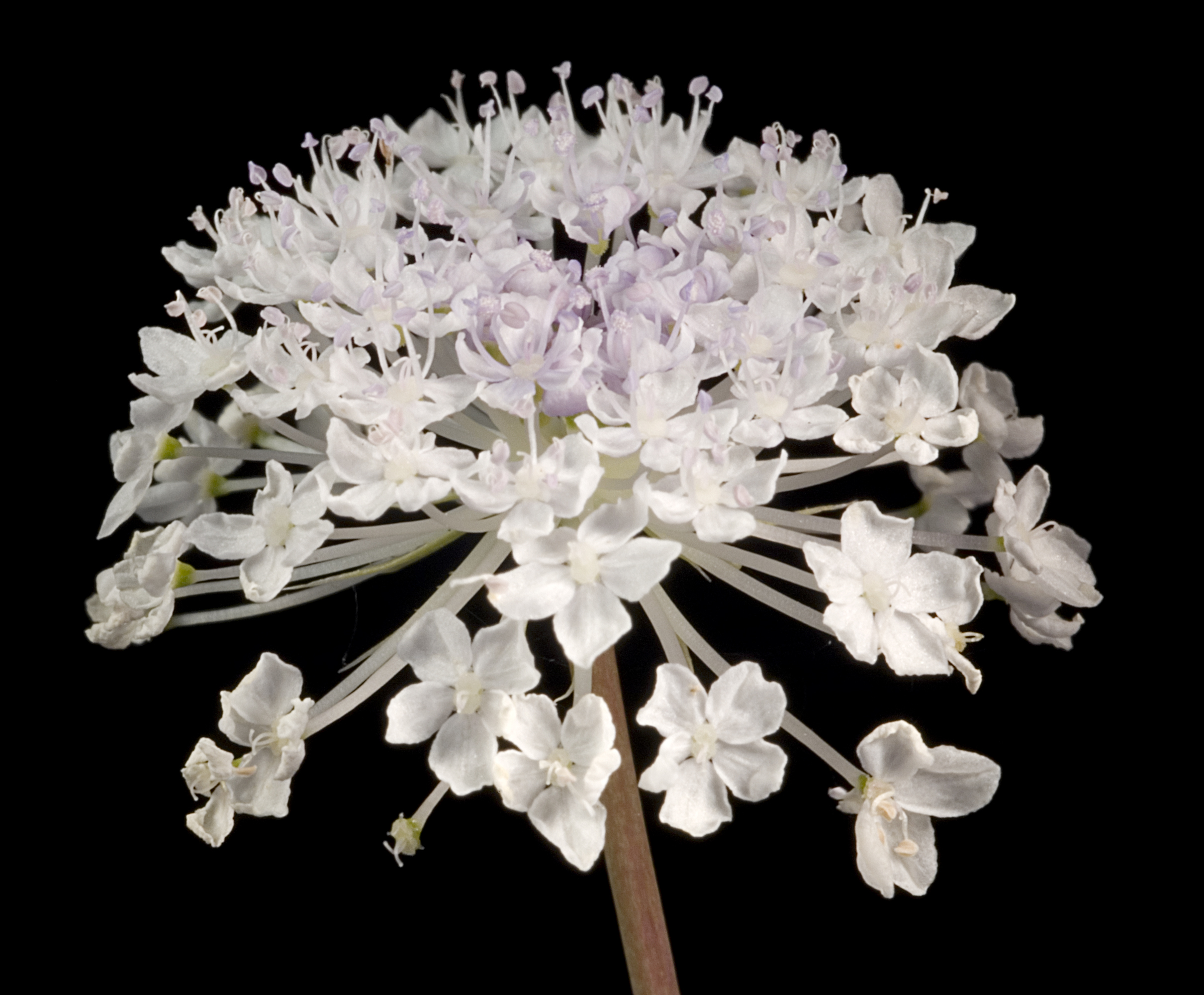

Scientific classification
- Kingdom: Plantae
- Clade: Tracheophytes
- Clade: Angiosperms
- Clade: Eudicots
- Clade: Asterids
- Order: Apiales
- Family: Araliaceae
- Genus: Trachymene
- Species: T. grandis

Binomial name
- Trachymene grandis (Turcz.) Rye

= Trachymene grandis =

Species of flowering plant

Trachymene grandis is a species of herb in the family Araliaceae. It is found only in southwestern Australia.

It grows up to 2.5 m high and has blue-white flowers, flowering between October and December or January to February. It grows on loamy, stoney soils, granite, peat, and ironstone, near creek banks, or in jarrah and karri forests.
