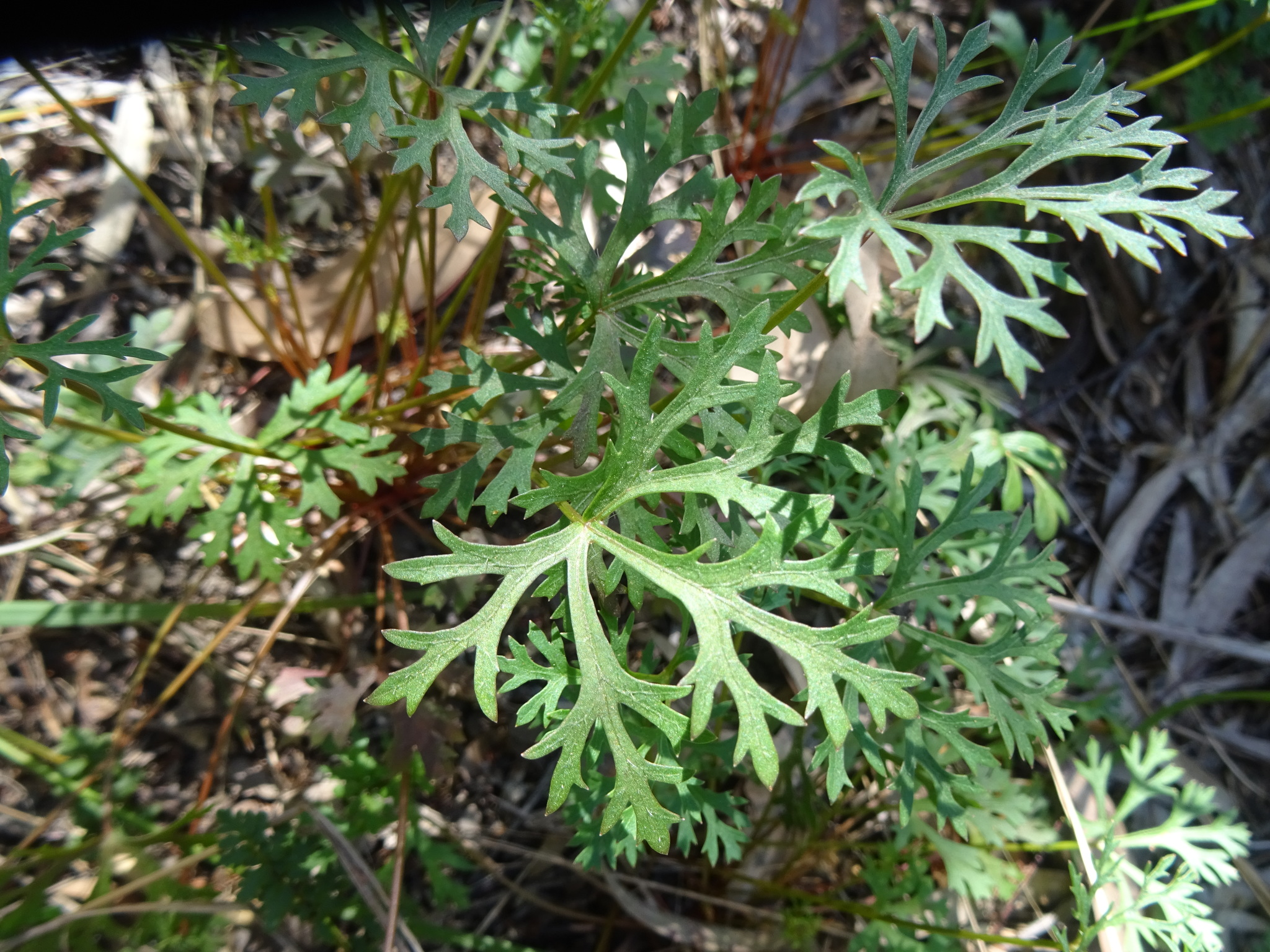
- Leaves
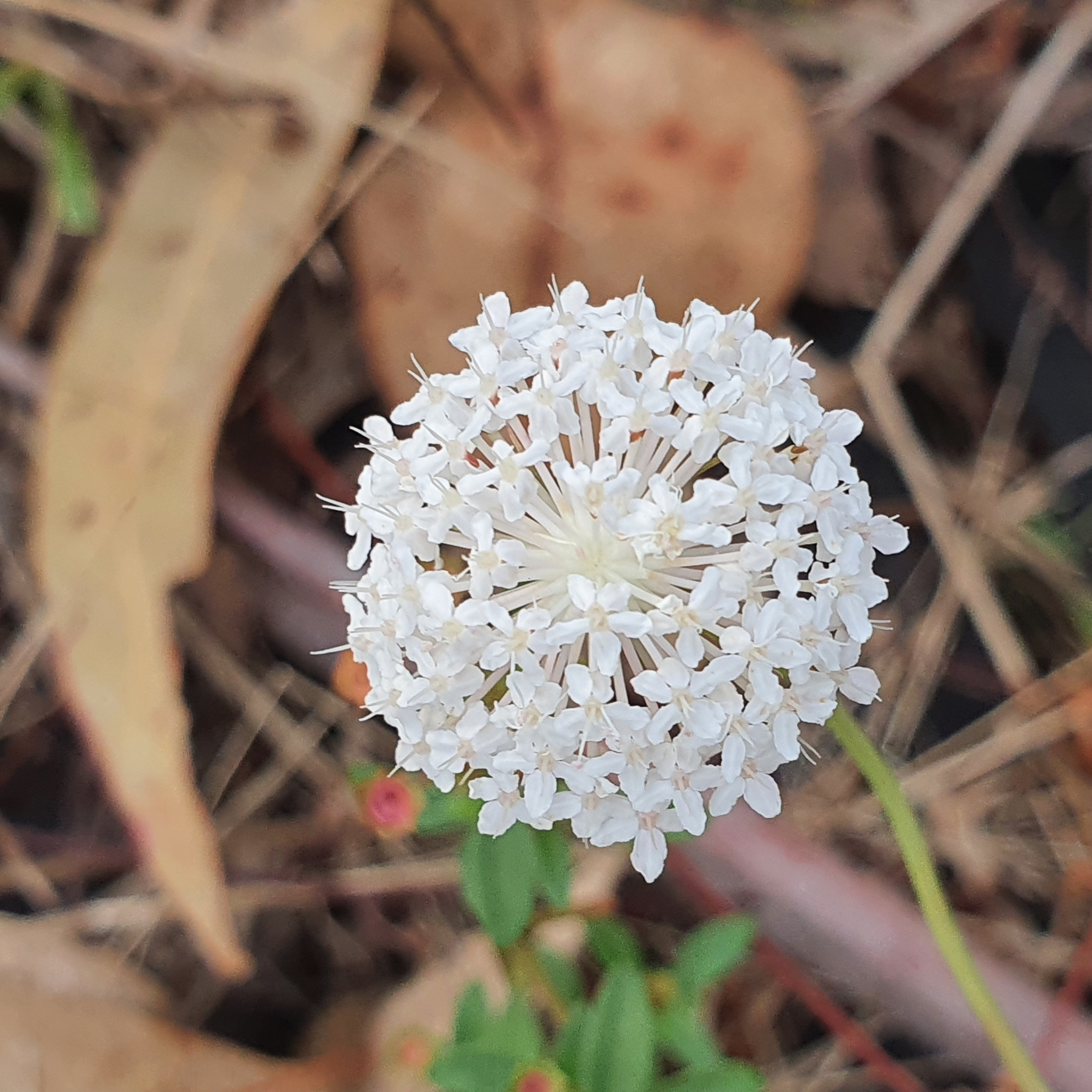
- The distinctive flowers

Scientific classification
- Kingdom: Plantae
- Clade: Tracheophytes
- Clade: Angiosperms
- Clade: Eudicots
- Clade: Asterids
- Order: Apiales
- Family: Araliaceae
- Genus: Trachymene
- Species: T. incisa

Binomial name
- Trachymene incisa Rudge

= Trachymene incisa =

Species of plant

Trachymene incisa, the wild parsnip, is a perennial herb native to eastern Australia growing in sclerophyll forest and cleared areas, with a preferences for sandy soils and rock crevices.

Wild parsnip is 80 cm high with thick perennial rootstock and is sparsely hairy to almost hairless. The leaves mostly emerge from the base of the plant, and are deeply 3–5-lobed to dissected, 1.4–6.5 cm long and 1.5–8 cm wide, with petioles to 13 cm long. Flowers are produced in umbels. Petals 0.9–2.2 mm long, white or rarely pink. Fruit broad ovate, 2.4–3.6 mm long, and brown.

== Uses ==
The roots are a traditional Aboriginal bushfood, and are eaten after baking in campfire coals or in earth ovens.
