= Jesmond Dene, California =

Unincorporated community in California, United States

Jesmond Dene
- Unincorporated community
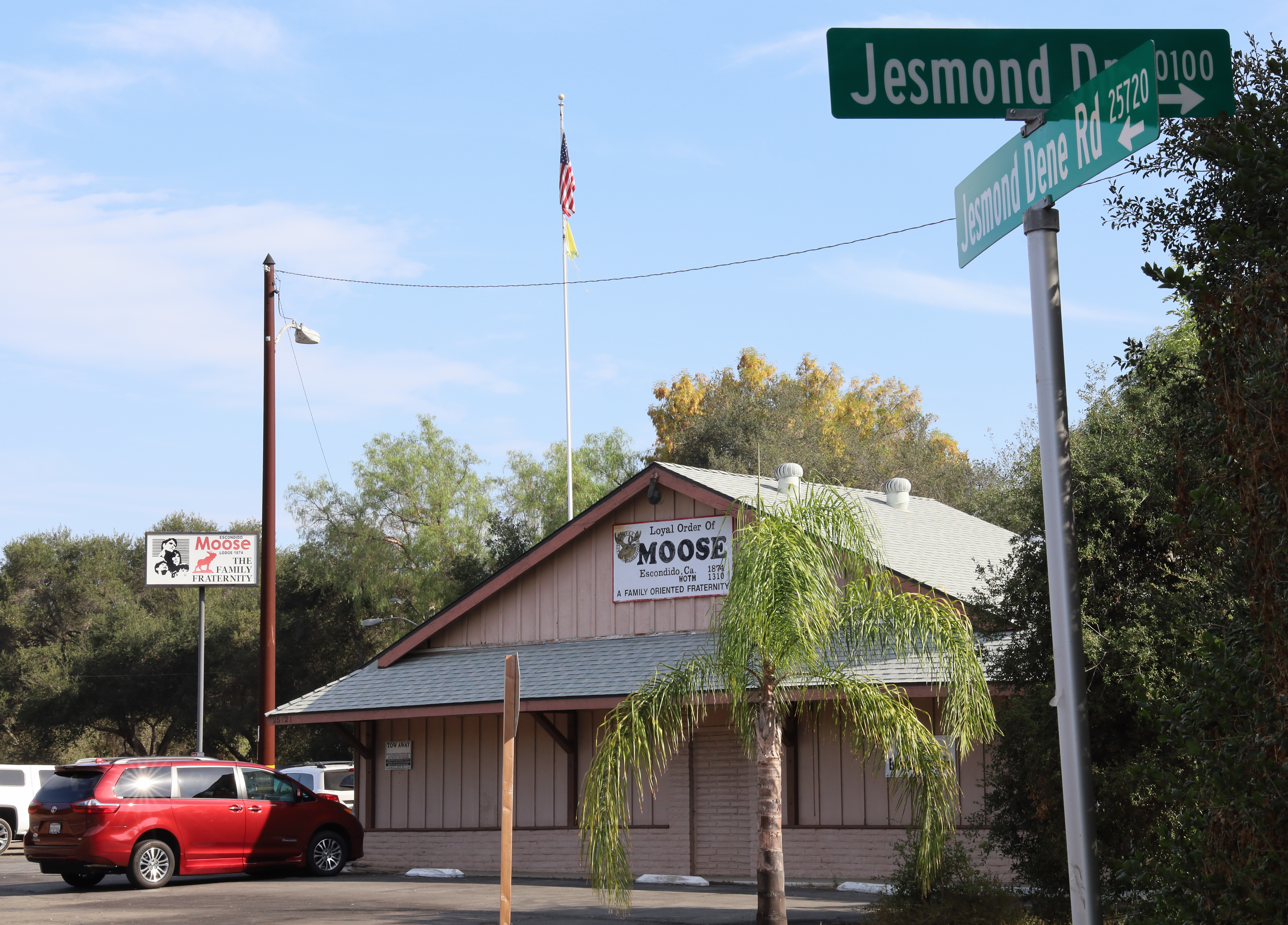
- Erstwhile Jesmond Dene Clubhouse, since the 1960s the Escondido Moose Lodge

- Location within the state of California Jesmond Dene (the United States)
- Coordinates: 33°10′49″N 117°6′30″W
- Country: United States
- State: California
- County: San Diego
- Elevation: 900 ft (270 m)
- Time zone: UTC-8 (Pacific (PST))
  - Summer (DST): UTC-7 (PDT)
- ZIP codes: 92026
- Area codes: 442/760
- FIPS code: 06-37330
- GNIS feature ID: 1660813

Jesmond Dene is an unincorporated community neighboring Escondido in San Diego County, California. It lies just east of Interstate 15 north of Escondido and has a ZIP Code of 92026 (as assigned to Escondido). The community is inside area code 760.

It was named after Jesmond Dene park in Newcastle upon Tyne.

== History ==
Jesmond Dene was established as a subdivision of a growing Escondido in the 1920s. The subdivision was created by the W. F. Moore company in 1926 with a US$50,000 investment to create a 160-acre (65 ha) suburban tract in Moosa Canyon. The new tract had tennis courts, a dance hall, and horseshoe courts. A creek in the area was dammed to create a swimming pool for residents. All of the amenities of the area were free to use for lodgers who constructed their home on one of the tract's 750 plots, each being 80 by 100 feet in dimension. The grand opening of Jesmond Dene took place on November 14, 1926.

The Desmond Jene post office opened on February 16, 1933, but only lasted until January 31, 1935, when it was moved to Escondido. For many years, the neighborhood had tall stone gateposts at its entrance on Jesmond Dene Road, initially known as Jesmond Drive. The stone gateposts were removed decades later by the county due to deterioration.

The neighborhood experienced a downturn in quality and upkeep due to discrepancies in some of the lodge deeds and effects of the Great Depression. After several years of operation, the Jesmond Dene Clubhouse was closed and only used for small, private affairs. The clubhouse was purchased by Henry and Ida Zilz in 1945, a couple that also managed the Jesmond Dene Water Co. until the tract joined the Valley Center Municipal Water District. The old clubhouse was divided into a grocery store and tavern while under Zilz ownership. The Fraternal Order of Eagles bought the clubhouse building in the late-1950s and turned it into Aerie 2175. It was sold to the Loyal Order of Moose in the 1960s and the organization still operates out of the building today.
