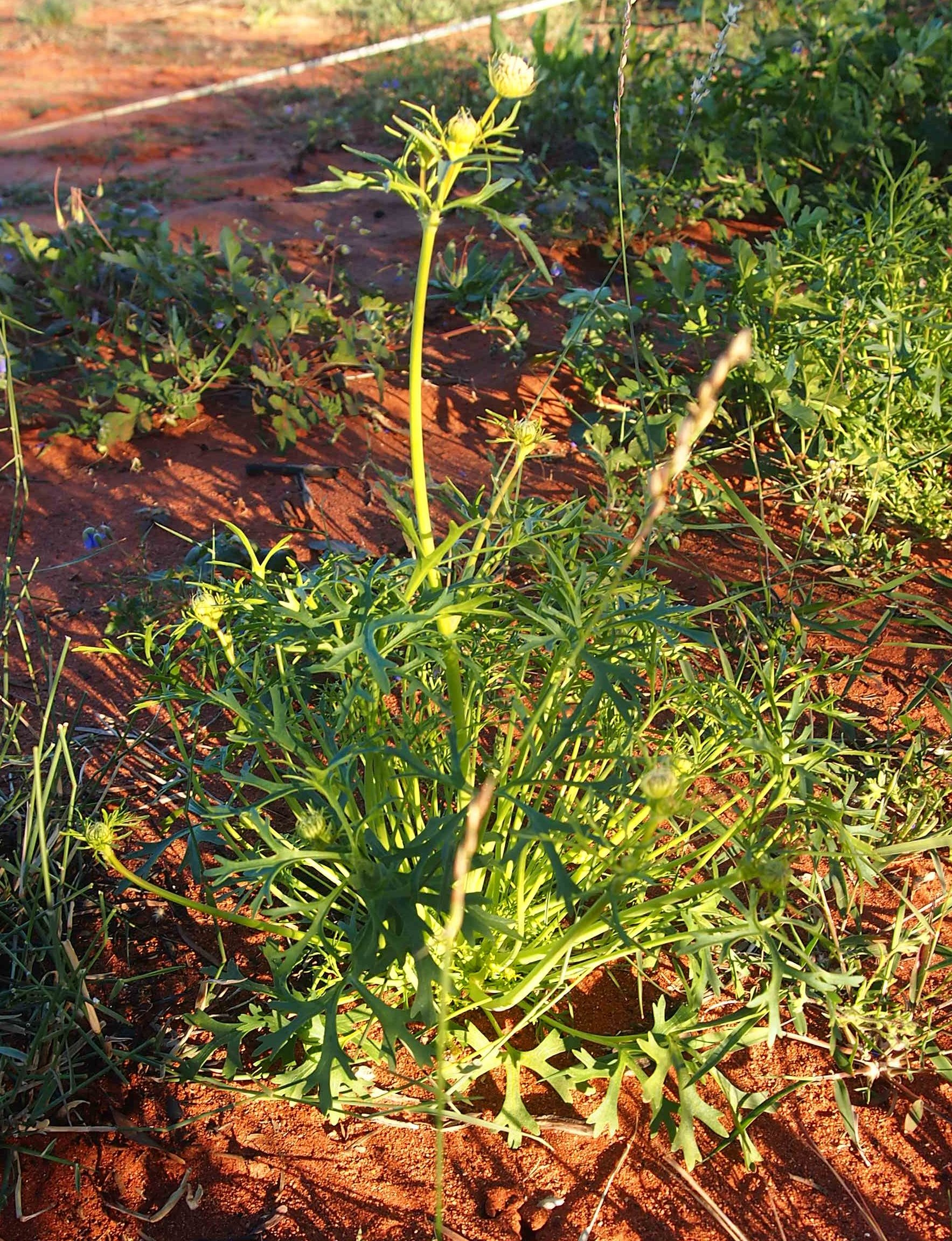
- Trachymene glaucifolia

Scientific classification
- Kingdom: Plantae
- Clade: Tracheophytes
- Clade: Angiosperms
- Clade: Eudicots
- Clade: Asterids
- Order: Apiales
- Family: Araliaceae
- Subfamily: Hydrocotyloideae
- Genus: Trachymene; Rudge

Synonyms
- Cesatia Endl.; Didiscus DC. ex Hook.; Dimetopia DC.; Dominia Fedde; Hemicarpus F.Muell.; Huegelia Rchb.; Lampra Lindl. ex DC; Maidenia Domin; Pritzelia Walp.; Uldinia J.M.Black

= Trachymene =

Genus of plants

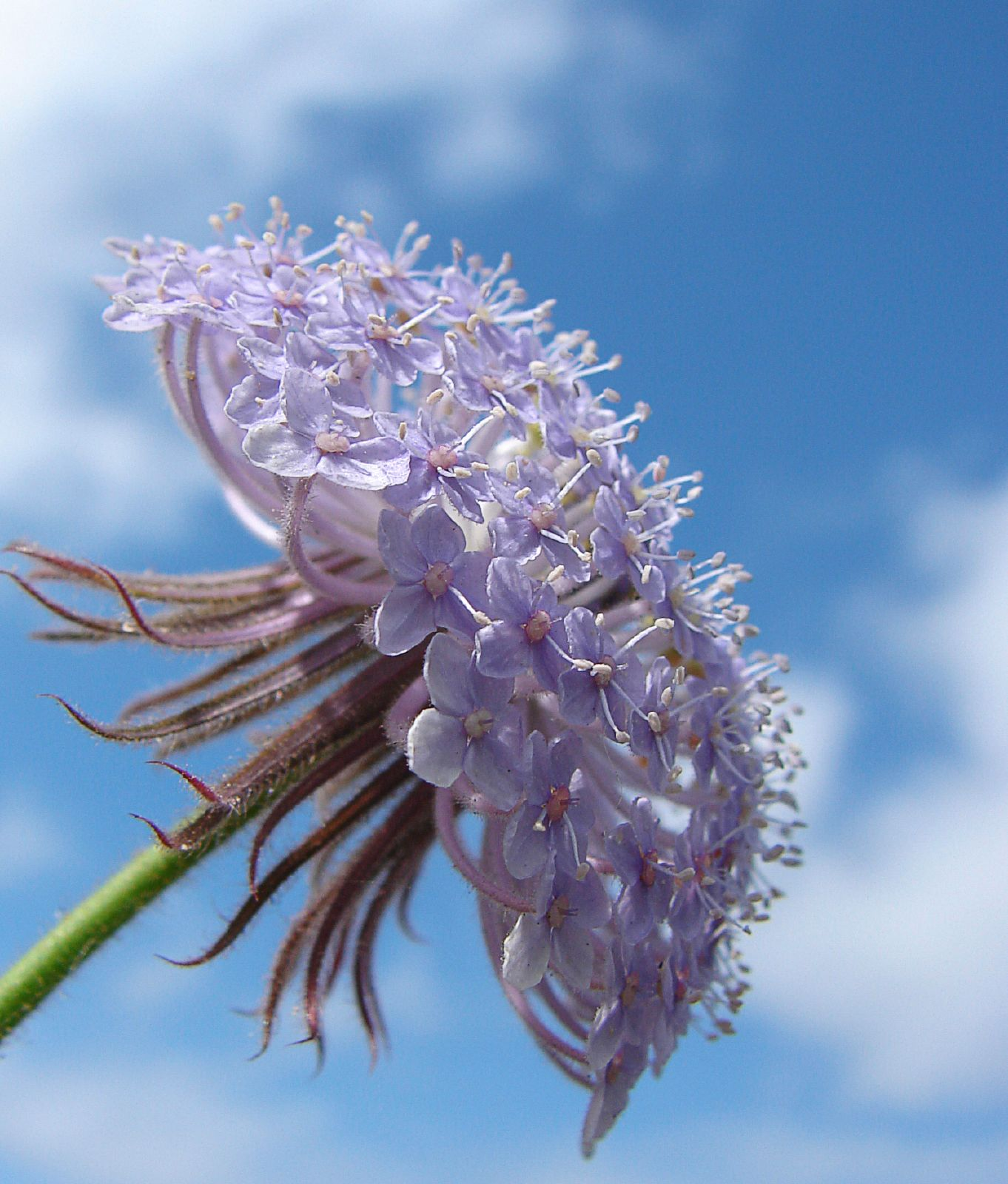
Trachymene coerulea (Australian lace flower)

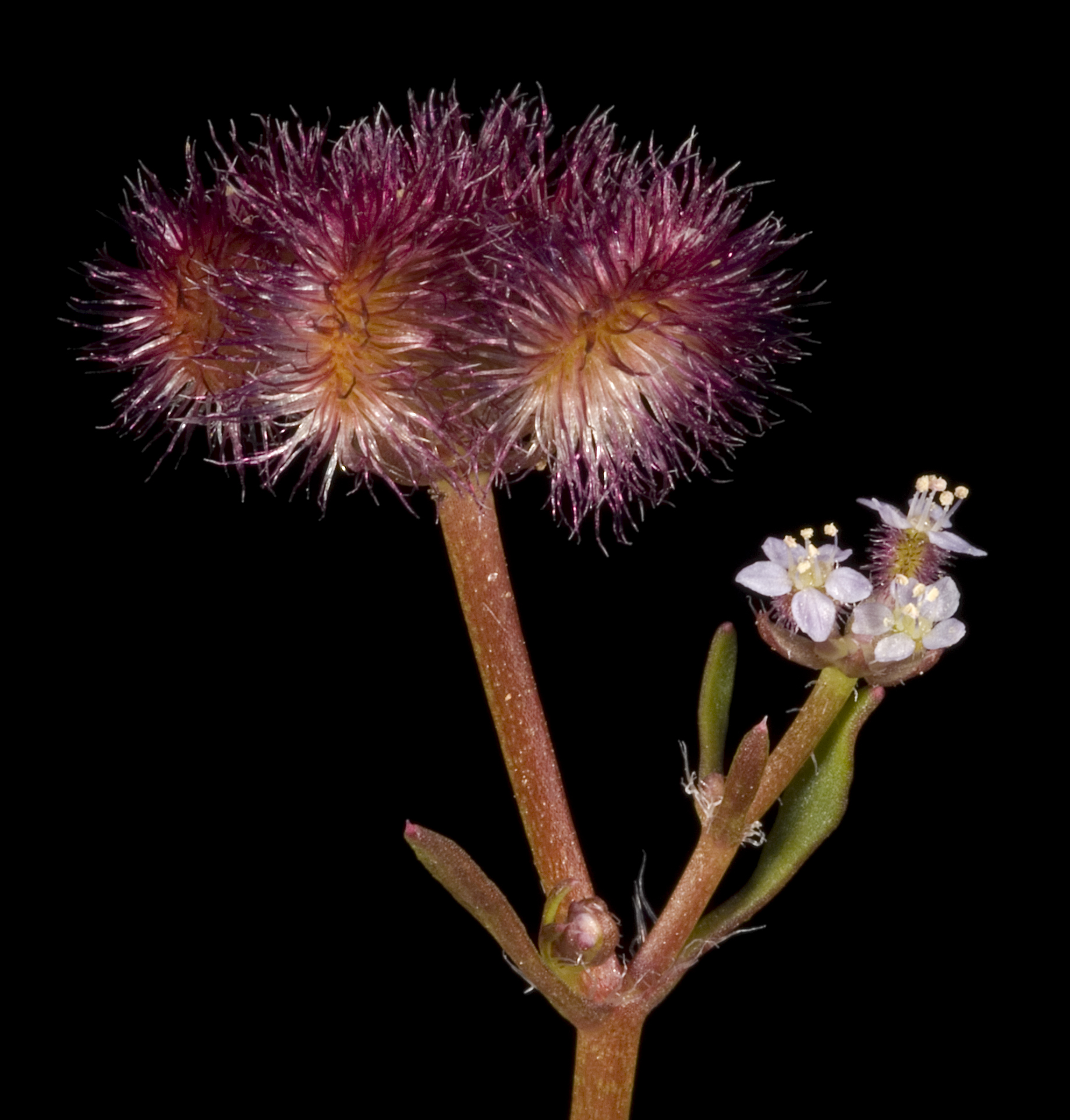
Trachymene cyanopetala

Trachymene is a genus of herbaceous plants in the family Araliaceae. The species are native to Australia, Malesia, New Caledonia and Fiji.

Species include:

- Trachymene anisocarpa (Turcz.)
- Trachymene bialata (Domin) B.L.Burtt
- Trachymene bivestita (Domin) L.A.S.Johnson
- Trachymene ceratocarpa (W. Fitzg.) Keighery & Rye
- Trachymene clivicola Boyland & A.E.Holland
- Trachymene coerulea Graham - Blue lace flower
- Trachymene composita (Domin) B.L.Burtt
- Trachymene croniniana (F.Muell.) T.Durand & B.D.Jacks.
- Trachymene cussonii (Montrouz.) B.L.Burtt
- Trachymene cyanantha Boyland
- Trachymene cyanopetala (F.Muell.) Benth. - Purple parsnip
- Trachymene dendrothrix Maconochie
- Trachymene didiscoides (F.Muell.) B.L.Burtt
- Trachymene dusenii (Domin) F.M.Bailey
- Trachymene elachocarpa (F.Muell.) B.L.Burtt
- Trachymene geraniifolia F.M.Bailey
- Trachymene gilleniae (Tate) B.L.Burtt
- Trachymene glandulosa (F.Muell.) Benth.
- Trachymene glaucifolia (F.Muell.) Benth. - Wild parsnip or wild carrot
- Trachymene grandis (Turcz.) Rye
- Trachymene hookeri (Domin) A.E.Holland
- Trachymene humilis (Hook.f.) Benth.
- Trachymene incisa Rudge - Wild parsnip
- Trachymene inflata Maconochie
- Trachymene longipedunculata Maconochie
- Trachymene microcephala (Domin) B.L.Burtt
- Trachymene ochracea L.A.S.Johnson - White parsnip or wild parsnip
- Trachymene oleracea (Domin) B.L.Burtt
- Trachymene ornata (Endl.) Druce - Sponge-fruit
- Trachymene pilbarensis Rye
- Trachymene pilosa Sm. - Native parsnip
- Trachymene pimpinellifolia (Domin) B.L.Burtt
- Trachymene procumbens (F.Muell.) Benth.
- Trachymene psammophila Maconochie
- Trachymene pyrophila Rye
- Trachymene rotundifolia (Benth.) Maconochie
- Trachymene scapigera (Domin) B.L.Burtt
- Trachymene setosa (O.Schwarz) B.L.Burtt
- Trachymene tenuifolia (Domin) B.L.Burtt
- Trachymene thysanocarpa J.M.Hart
- Trachymene umbratica J.M. Hart
- Trachymene villosa (F.Muell.) Benth.
