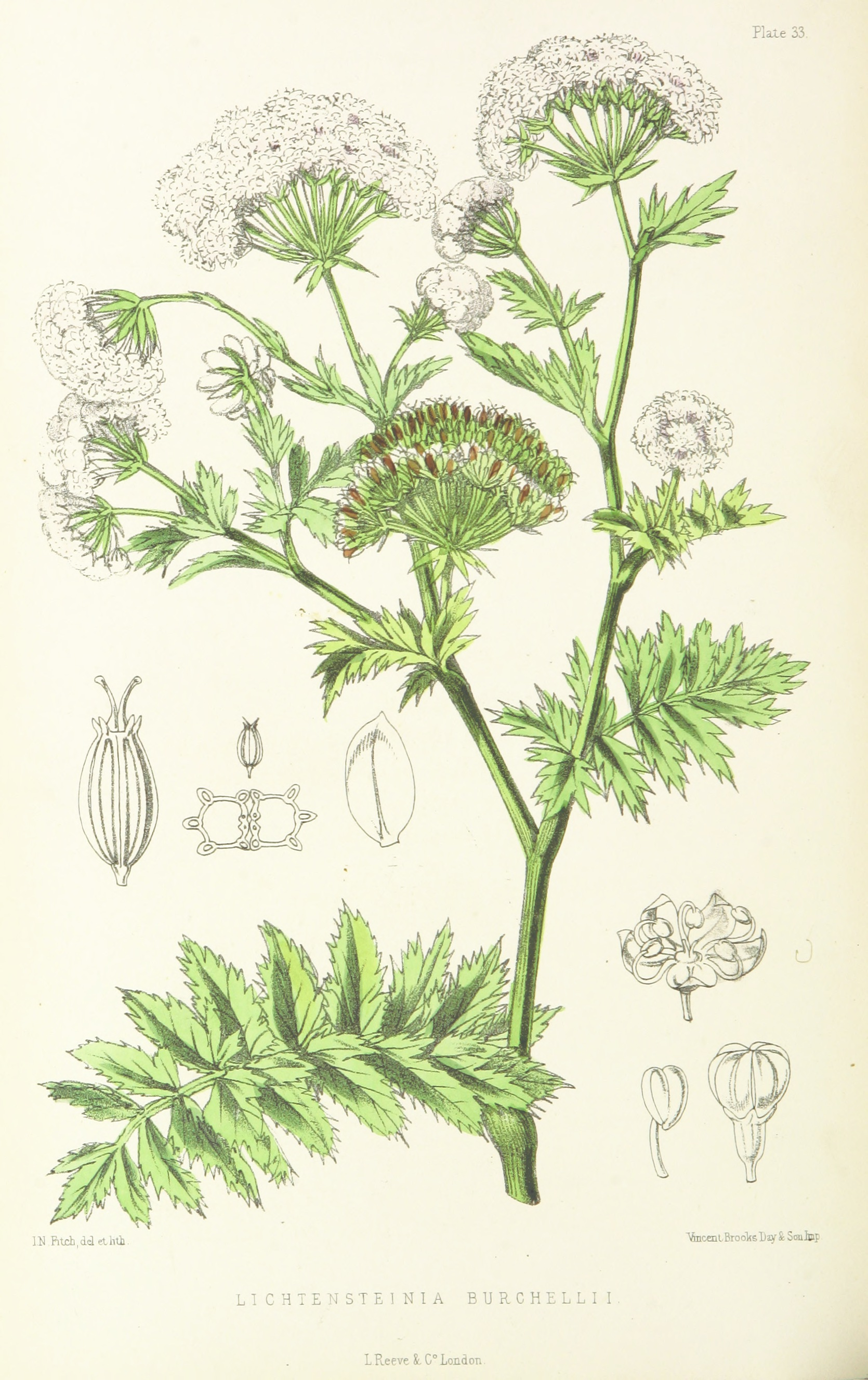

Conservation status
- Endangered (IUCN 3.1)

Scientific classification
- Kingdom: Plantae
- Clade: Embryophytes
- Clade: Tracheophytes
- Clade: Spermatophytes
- Clade: Angiosperms
- Clade: Eudicots
- Clade: Asterids
- Order: Apiales
- Family: Apiaceae
- Genus: Berula
- Species: B. burchellii

Binomial name
- Berula burchellii (Hook.f.) Spalik & S.R.Downie

Synonyms
- Gliopsis burchellii (Hook.f.) Rauschert; Lichtensteinia burchellii Hook.f.; Ruthea burchellii (Hook.f.) Drude; Sium burchellii (Hook.f.) Hemsl.

= Berula burchellii =

Species of flowering plant

Berula burchellii, known commonly as dwarf jellico, is a species of flowering plant in the family Apiaceae. It is endemic to Saint Helena. It grows on steep island cliffs. It is threatened by the fragmentation of its small populations, introduced species of plants, landslides, and possibly hybridization with Berula bracteata.
