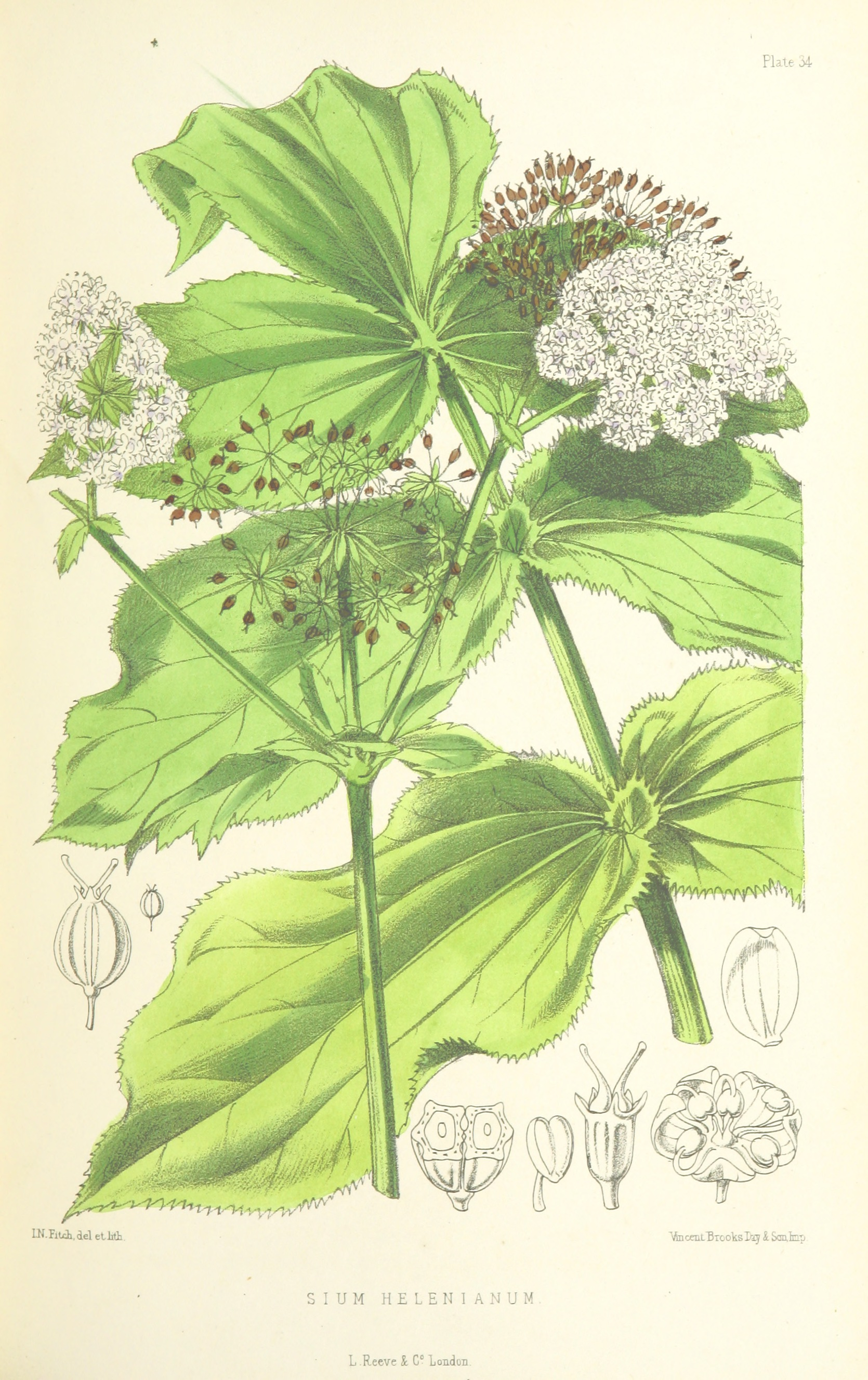

Conservation status
- Vulnerable (IUCN 3.1)

Scientific classification
- Kingdom: Plantae
- Clade: Embryophytes
- Clade: Tracheophytes
- Clade: Spermatophytes
- Clade: Angiosperms
- Clade: Eudicots
- Clade: Asterids
- Order: Apiales
- Family: Apiaceae
- Genus: Berula
- Species: B. bracteata

Binomial name
- Berula bracteata (Roxb.) Spalik & S.R.Downie

Synonyms
- Angelica bracteata Roxb.; Sium bracteatum (Roxb.) Cronk; Sium helenianum Hook.f.

= Berula bracteata =

Species of flowering plant

Berula bracteata (known commonly as jellico and large jellico) is a species of flowering plant in the family Apiaceae. It is endemic to Saint Helena. It is protected in Diana's Peak National Park, but proper management practices have not yet been established. It is threatened by fragmentation of its populations, introduced species of plants, and possibly hybridization with Berula burchellii.

This species was once eaten by the island residents as a raw vegetable like celery.
