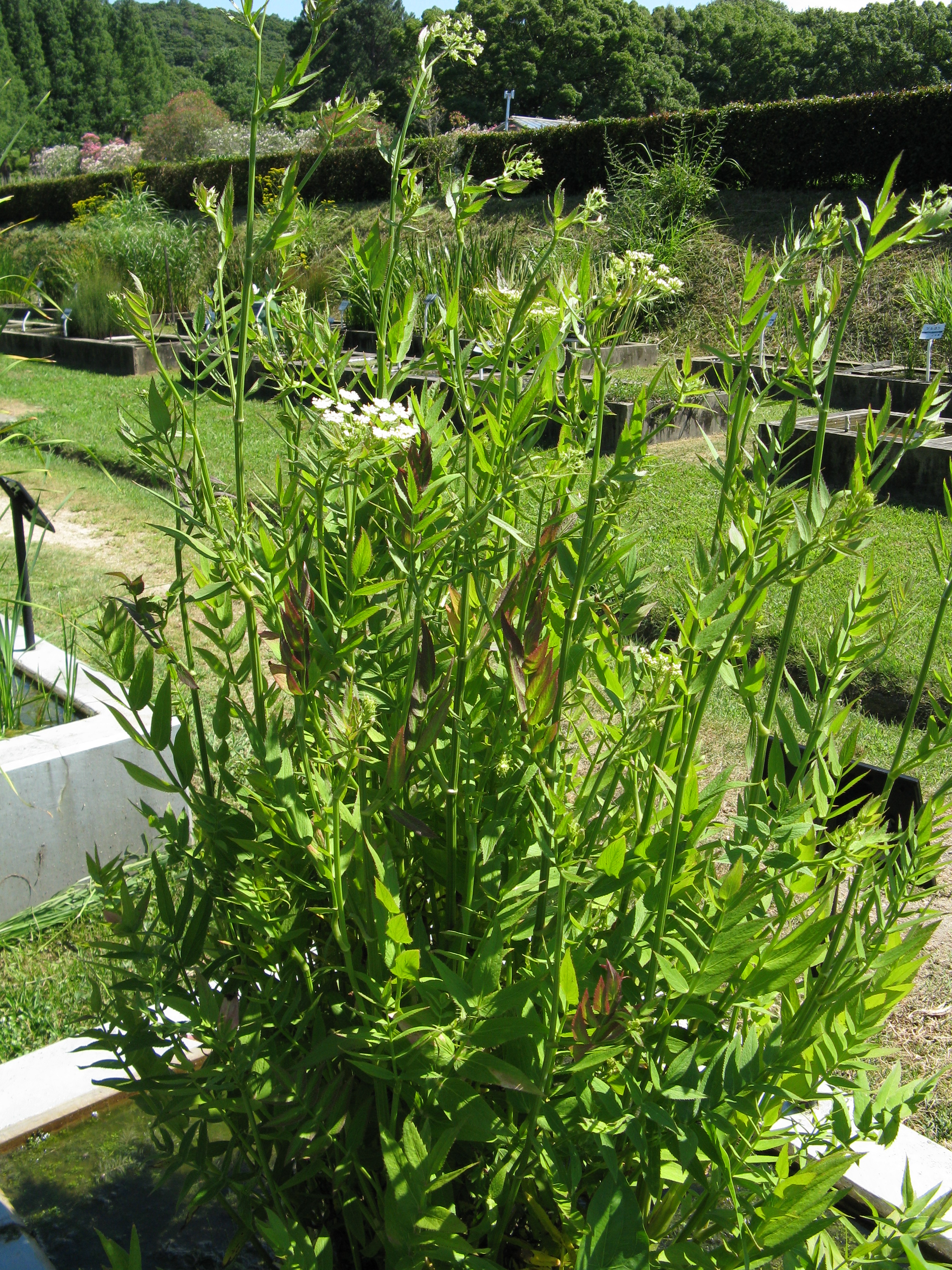

Conservation status
- Secure (NatureServe)

Scientific classification
- Kingdom: Plantae
- Clade: Tracheophytes
- Clade: Angiosperms
- Clade: Eudicots
- Clade: Asterids
- Order: Apiales
- Family: Apiaceae
- Genus: Sium
- Species: S. suave

Binomial name
- Sium suave Walter (1788)

Synonyms
- Apium cicutifolia (Schrank) Benth. & Hook.f. ex F.B.Forbes & Hemsl. (1887); Apium lineare (Michx.) Alph.Wood (1870); Cicuta davurica (Hoffm.) Fisch. ex F.Dietr. (1826); Critamus dauricus Hoffm. (1816); Drepanophyllum heterophyllum (Greene) Koso-Pol. (1914); Drepanophyllum lineare (Michx.) Koso-Pol. (1914); Falcaria dahurica DC. (1830); Sium californicum Baill. (1879); Sium cicutarium W.H.Baxter (1850); Sium cicutifolium Schrank (1789); Sium floridanum Small (1933); Sium formosanum Hayata (1921); Sium heterophyllum Greene (1890); Sium lineare Michx. (1803); Sium nipponicum Maxim. (1873); Sium ovatum Yatabe (1891); Sium rugosum Raf. (1830); Sium tenuifolium Muhl. (1813); Sium turfosum H.Wolff (1921); Siumis heterophyla Raf. (1838)

= Sium suave =

Species of flowering plant

Sium suave, the water parsnip or hemlock waterparsnip, is a perennial wildflower in the family Apiaceae. It is native to many areas of both Asia and North America. The common name water parsnip is due to its similarity to parsnip (Pastinaca sativa) and its wetland habitat. The alternate common name hemlock waterparsnip is due to its similarity to the highly poisonous spotted water hemlock (Cicuta maculata).

== Introduction ==
Sium suave, also widely known as water parsnip, is a wildflower native to parts of the northern hemisphere and thriving in primarily wetland habitats. Sium suave belongs to the carrot family, Apiaceae. Water parsnip blooms from July to August and creates many small white flowers with umbel inflorescences. Sium suave resembles a few quite poisonous plants, and consumption should be avoided. There is a vast number of insect species of bees, beetles, wasps, butterflies, and flies that visit this plant for its nectar and pollen. Sium come from the Latin sion meaning water parsley, and suave comes from the Latin suâvis meaning sweet.

== Description ==
The shape and size of the leaves depends on the environment in which S. suave grows. Basal rosette leaves form on moist ground at around 3.8 cm long, and in shallow water they grow in clusters of aquatic leaves. Once leaves are formed this flowering plant stands up to 3 meters tall with stems that are 5 cm in diameter. Water parsnip has light green and glabrous stems with longitudinal veins and few branches. Leaves along the stems are alternate and odd-pinnate. Water parsnip flowers are perfect (both male and female) and are self-fertile. The pedicels are 3–5 mm long and the fruit is ovoid. The fruit is dry but does not split open when ripe. The flowers have umbellule inflorescence with 10-20 white flowers. These white flowers are small (~3.2 mm across) with 5 petals. The petals can sometimes be of unequal size and are somewhat heart shaped.

== Taxonomy ==
Sium suave is a member of the order Apiales and the family Apiaceae, the celery, carrot and parsley family (also known as Umbelliferae). This family contains about 445 genera and about 3540 species. Some distinctive characteristics of this family include compound leaf, simple or compound umbel inflorescence containing many small flowers, 2 styles, 2-carpellate ovary, and a schizocarp fruit that splits into 2 mericarps. This species belongs to the genus Sium which is made up of about 9 species. Species in Sium are all perennial herbs of the northern hemisphere. Some common characteristics of this genus include serrate leaves with teeth turned inward and slightly overlapping, flowers in bracteate umbels with conspicuous involucels, five small teeth on calyx, white petals that are obcordate with inflexed apex, styles with depressed conical base which spread or recurve above, fruit that are laterally flattened with mericarp exhibiting 5 ridges, and subterete seeds. The diploid number of chromosomes for Suim suave is 22. The Kutenai call water parsnip nakhankam (Ktunaxa: naq̓an̓kam). Sium suave (from the Latin sium, the Latinization of Greek sion, meaning "water parsley," and suâvis, meaning "sweet."), the hemlock waterparsnip or water parsnip, is a herb native to parts of Canada, Asia, and North America. Synonyms for S. suave include Sium cicutifolium Schrank, Sium floridanum Small, Sium suave Walter var. floridanum (Small) C.F. Reed, Apium cicutifolia (J.F.Gmel.) Benth. & Hook.f. ex F.B.Forbes & Hemsl., Cicuta dahurica Fisch. ex Schultz, Sium cicutifolium Schrenk, Sium formosanum Hayata, and Sium nipponicum Maxim. According to a molecular phylogeny created with maximum parsimony heuristic searches using a 59-sequence data set of Sium s.l., Helosciadium, Cryptotaenia, and outgroups, the sister groups of S. suave are Sium medium found in Central Asia and Sium latifolium found in Western Europe, Eastern Europe, and Western Asia.

== Distribution and habitat ==
Sium suave grows in wetland habitats (sandy and non-sandy). These wetland habits include wet prairies, bottoms of seeps, low areas along springs, soggy thickets, swamps, borders and shallow water of ponds, marshes, and ditches. It is native to both North America and Asia in Canada, the United States, Japan, Russian Federation, South Korea, and China.

== Uses ==
Extreme caution should be practiced when using this plant for food because it resembles the very poisonous Cicuta maculata (Spotted Water Hemlock). (Note: The Spotted Water Hemlock possesses a few traits that water parsnip does not: purplish mottling on the stem, multiple leaflet divisions, and leaflet veins ending in notches.) Edible parts of Sium suave include the root in the spring and fall, either raw or cooked; it has a nutty flavor. The leaves are also sometimes used for condiments such as relish. Crushed water parsnip roots have also been used as an analgesic (pain reliever) in cases of broken limbs.

== Cultivation ==
Water parsnip should be grown in wet mucky soil / sand or in standing water up to an inch and a half deep. It also prefers partial to full sun. The seeds should be sown in late winter to early spring during a cold frame. Sium suave is in flower from July to August while the seeds ripen from September to October. It has been shown to accumulate arsenic and heavy metals near abandoned mine tailings in South Korea. In the presence of added N03-N to the ground, water parsnip shows increased production.

== Faunal associations ==
These flowers attract a wide variety of insects. While most insects are attracted to the nectar of the flower, bees seek both their nectar and pollen. These include 21 species of bees, 73 species of flies, 91 species of wasps,4 species of plant bugs, 5 species of butterflies, and 19 species of beetles. Two types of physodermas have been found to parasitize S. suave. Type I physoderm causes conspicuous black pustules on several parts of the plant including the stem, petiole, leaflet lemina, and flowers. Type II physoderma formed abundant resting spores and epibiotic sporangia on seedlings of S. suave. The stems and leaves of this plant are toxic to livestock.
