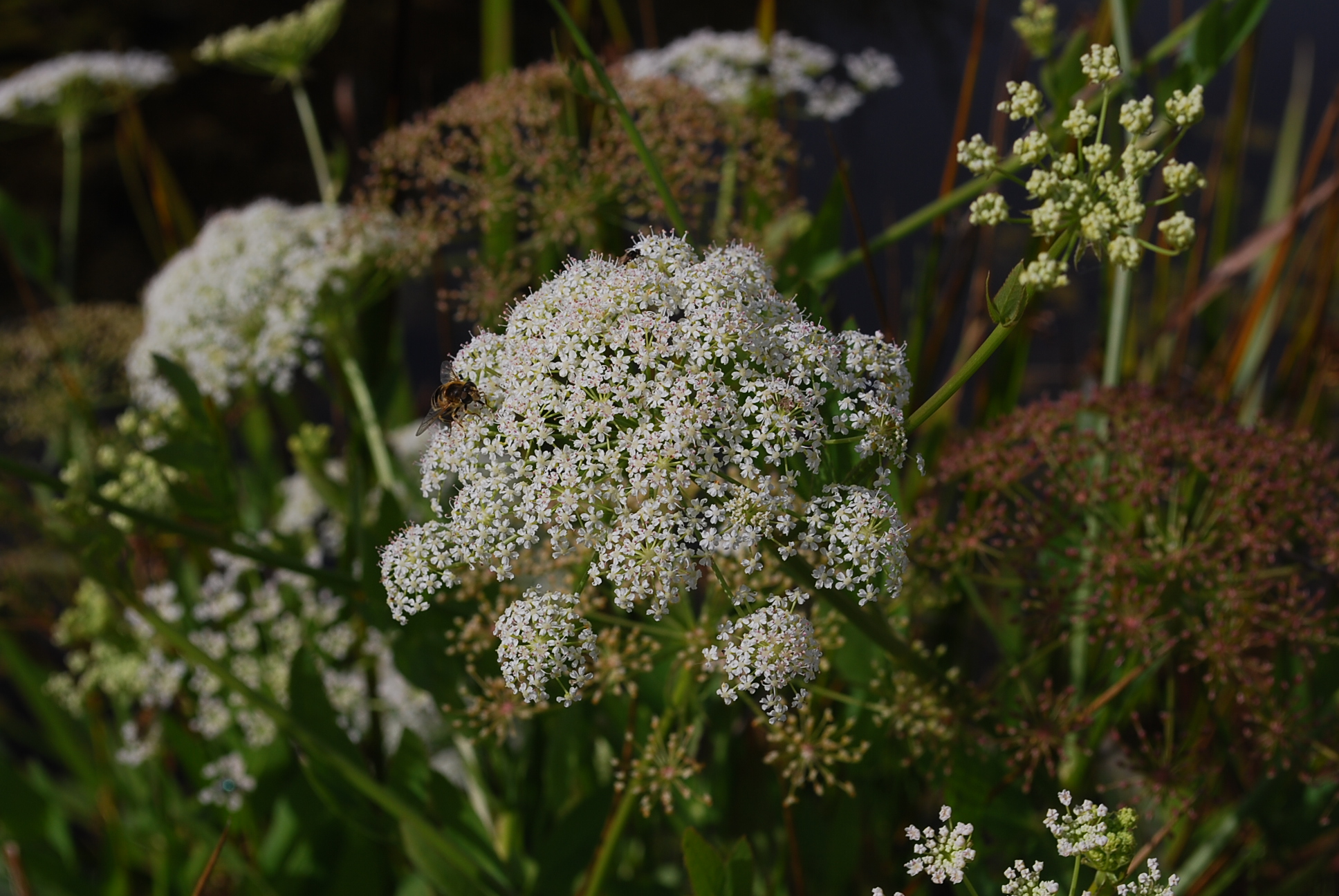

Scientific classification
- Kingdom: Plantae
- Clade: Tracheophytes
- Clade: Angiosperms
- Clade: Eudicots
- Clade: Asterids
- Order: Apiales
- Family: Apiaceae
- Genus: Sium
- Species: S. latifolium

Binomial name
- Sium latifolium L.

= Sium latifolium =

Species of flowering plant

Sium latifolium is a species of flowering plant in the family Apiaceae known by the common names great water-parsnip, greater water-parsnip, and wideleaf waterparsnip. It is native to much of Europe, Kazakhstan, and Siberia.

This plant grows in wet habitat such as swamps and lakeshores, sometimes in the water. It is a perennial herb with a hollow, grooved stem up to 2 meters tall. The herbage is green and hairless. The leaves are up to 30 centimeters long with blades borne on hollow petioles that clasp the stem at their bases. The inflorescence is an umbel of white flowers.

When eaten by dairy cows, the plant tends to imbue their milk with an unpleasant taste.

== Toxicity/edibility ==
The rootstock is acrid and poisonous, but the leaves have been cooked and eaten as a vegetable in Italy and the ripe seeds - which are aromatic due to their limonene content - have been used (in small quantities) as a spice or seasoning in Scandinavian cuisine.
