= Primulina drakei =

Conservation status
- Least Concern (IUCN 3.1)

Scientific classification
- Kingdom: Plantae
- Clade: Embryophytes
- Clade: Tracheophytes
- Clade: Spermatophytes
- Clade: Angiosperms
- Clade: Eudicots
- Clade: Asterids
- Order: Lamiales
- Family: Gesneriaceae
- Genus: Primulina
- Species: P. drakei

Binomial name
- Primulina drakei (B.L.Burtt) Mich.Möller & A.Weber

Synonyms
- Chirita bracteosa Drake; Chirita drakei B.L.Burtt

Species of flowering plant

Primulina drakei is a plant in the family Gesneriaceae, native to Vietnam. The species was formerly placed in the genus Chirita.

== Description ==
Primulina drakei grows as a bushy shrub, with a woody trunk of diameter up to 4 centimetres (2 in). The plant may grow to 100 cm (40 in) tall and 60 cm (24 in) wide. The inflorescences bear two or three violet flowers.

== Distribution and habitat ==
Primulina drakei is endemic to Vietnam, where it is confined to the islands of Hạ Long Bay, a UNESCO World Heritage Site. Its habitat is on rocks, cliffs and scree from sea level to 100 m (300 ft) altitude.
