= Primulina hiepii =

Conservation status
- Least Concern (IUCN 3.1)

Scientific classification
- Kingdom: Plantae
- Clade: Embryophytes
- Clade: Tracheophytes
- Clade: Spermatophytes
- Clade: Angiosperms
- Clade: Eudicots
- Clade: Asterids
- Order: Lamiales
- Family: Gesneriaceae
- Genus: Primulina
- Species: P. hiepii

Binomial name
- Primulina hiepii (Kiew) Mich.Möller & A.Weber

Synonyms
- Chirita hiepii Kiew

Species of flowering plant

Primulina hiepii is a plant in the family Gesneriaceae, native to Vietnam. It is named for the Vietnamese botanist Tiên Hiêp Nguyên. The species was formerly placed in the genus Chirita.

== Description ==
Primulina hiepii grows as a perennial herb. The leaves are lanceolate. The inflorescences bear up to 14 purple flowers and measure up to 36 cm (14 in) long.

== Distribution and habitat ==
Primulina hiepii is endemic to Vietnam, where it is confined to the islands of Hạ Long Bay, a UNESCO World Heritage Site. Its habitat is in shaded cracks on the islands' limestone rocks, near sea level.
