= Primulina modesta =

Conservation status
- Critically Endangered (IUCN 3.1)

Scientific classification
- Kingdom: Plantae
- Clade: Embryophytes
- Clade: Tracheophytes
- Clade: Spermatophytes
- Clade: Angiosperms
- Clade: Eudicots
- Clade: Asterids
- Order: Lamiales
- Family: Gesneriaceae
- Genus: Primulina
- Species: P. modesta

Binomial name
- Primulina modesta (Kiew & T.H.Nguyên) Mich.Möller & A.Weber

Synonyms
- Chirita modesta Kiew & T.H.Nguyên

Species of flowering plant

Primulina modesta is a plant in the family Gesneriaceae, native to Vietnam. It was formerly placed in the genus Chirita.

== Description ==
Primulina modesta grows as a perennial herb. The leaves are dark green above, pale beneath and measure up to 3 cm (1 in) long. The inflorescences bear up to 16 white flowers and measure up to 11 cm (4 in) long.

== Distribution and habitat ==
Primulina modesta is endemic to Vietnam, where it is confined to Tam Cung Cave, on an island in Hạ Long Bay, a UNESCO World Heritage Site. Its habitat is in shaded crevices on the vertical cliffs near the mouth of the cave.

== Conservation ==
Primulina modesta has been assessed as critically endangered on the IUCN Red List. The species is confined to a small area and the population has been estimated at fewer than 50 plants.
