= Primulina halongensis =

Conservation status
- Least Concern (IUCN 3.1)

Scientific classification
- Kingdom: Plantae
- Clade: Embryophytes
- Clade: Tracheophytes
- Clade: Spermatophytes
- Clade: Angiosperms
- Clade: Eudicots
- Clade: Asterids
- Order: Lamiales
- Family: Gesneriaceae
- Genus: Primulina
- Species: P. halongensis

Binomial name
- Primulina halongensis (Kiew & T.H.Nguyên) Mich.Möller & A.Weber

Synonyms
- Chirita halongensis Kiew & T.H.Nguyên

Species of flowering plant

Primulina halongensis is a plant in the family Gesneriaceae, native to Vietnam. The specific epithet halongensis is for Hạ Long Bay, where the species is found. It was formerly placed in the genus Chirita.

== Description ==
Primulina halongensis grows as a perennial herb. Its brittle leaves are glabrous.The inflorescences bear up to 30 purple flowers and measure up to 26 cm (10 in) long. The fruit is reddish brown.

== Distribution and habitat ==
Primulina halongensis is endemic to Vietnam, where it is confined to the islands of Hạ Long Bay, a UNESCO World Heritage Site. Its habitat is in cracks and rocks near the sea to exposed scree higher up on the limestone islands.
