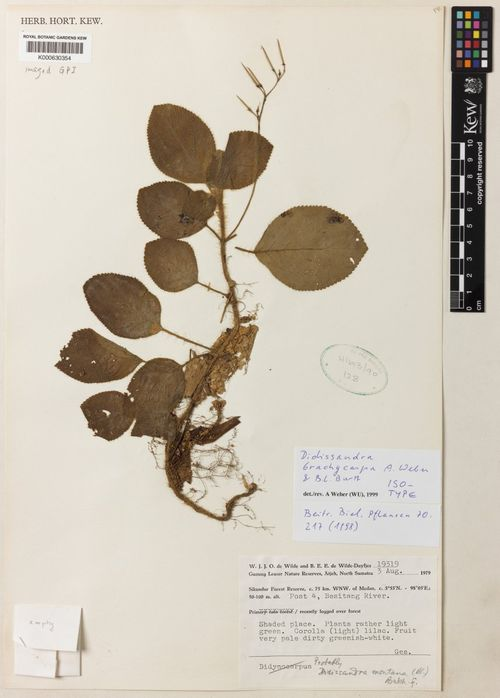

Scientific classification
- Kingdom: Plantae
- Clade: Embryophytes
- Clade: Tracheophytes
- Clade: Spermatophytes
- Clade: Angiosperms
- Clade: Eudicots
- Clade: Asterids
- Order: Lamiales
- Family: Gesneriaceae
- Genus: Didissandra
- Species: D. brachycarpa

Binomial name
- Didissandra brachycarpa A.Weber & B.L.Burtt

= Didissandra brachycarpa =

Species of flowering plant

Didissandra brachycarpa is a species of flowering plant in the family Gesneriaceae.

It is a subshrub, native to the wet tropical biome of Sumatra.

== Taxonomy ==
Anton Weber and Brian Laurence Burtt described Didissandra brachycarpa in 1998. The type material was collected in Gunung Leuser National Park, Aceh, Indonesia, in 1979.
