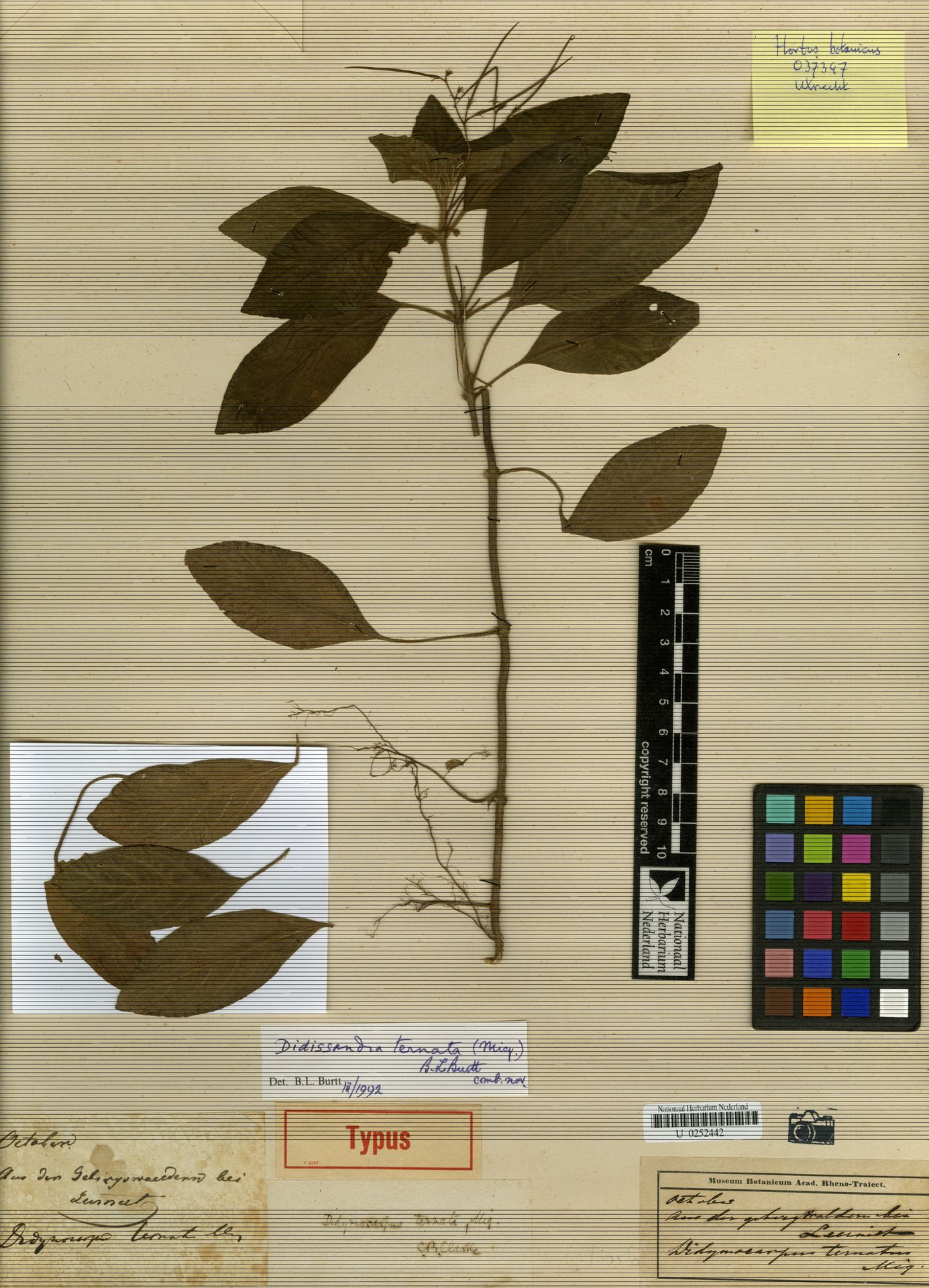

Scientific classification
- Kingdom: Plantae
- Clade: Embryophytes
- Clade: Tracheophytes
- Clade: Spermatophytes
- Clade: Angiosperms
- Clade: Eudicots
- Clade: Asterids
- Order: Lamiales
- Family: Gesneriaceae
- Genus: Didissandra
- Species: D. ternata

Binomial name
- Didissandra ternata (Miq.) A.Weber & B.L.Burtt

Synonyms
- Didymocarpus ternatus Miq.; Roettlera ternata (Miq.) Kuntze

= Didissandra ternata =

Species of flowering plant

Didissandra ternata is a species of flowering plant in the family Gesneriaceae. It is a subshrub.

The species is native to Sumatra, and was first described in 1861.

== Distribution ==
Didissandra ternata is native to the wet tropical biome of northern Sumatra.

== Taxonomy ==
Friedrich Anton Wilhelm Miquel described the species in 1861, as Didymocarpus ternatus. In 1891, Otto Kuntze transferred the species to the genus Roettlera. In 1998, Anton Weber and Brian Laurence Burtt transferred the species to the genus Didissandra.
