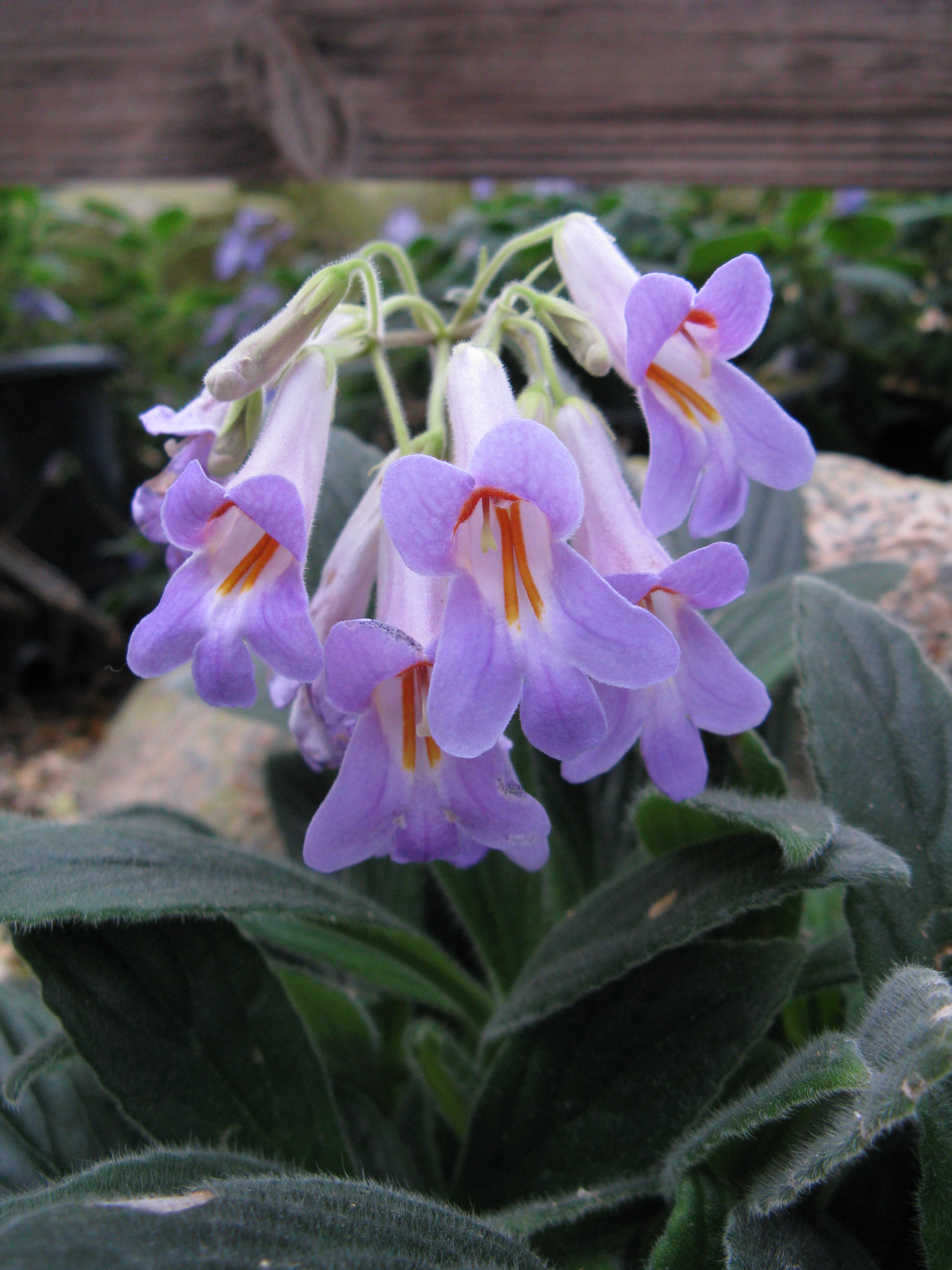
- A Primulina hybrid, Primulina linearifolia × Primulina sinensis

Scientific classification
- Kingdom: Plantae
- Clade: Tracheophytes
- Clade: Angiosperms
- Clade: Eudicots
- Clade: Asterids
- Order: Lamiales
- Family: Gesneriaceae
- Subfamily: Didymocarpoideae
- Genus: Primulina; Hance (1883)

Species
- 232; see text

Synonyms
- Chiritopsis W.T.Wang (1981); Deltocheilos W.T.Wang (1981); Wentsaiboea D.Fang & D.H.Qin (2004)

= Primulina =

Genus of flowering plants

Primulina is a genus of flowering plants in the African violet family Gesneriaceae. It includes 232 species native to southern and north-central China and northern Vietnam. The species are mostly calciphilous, and typically grow in the extensive limestone karst regions of China and Vietnam.

In 2011 the genus was expanded with the transfer of many species that had previously been placed in the genus Chirita. In 2016 five species were moved to the genus Deinostigma, which was merged into Metapetrocosmea in 2022. A phylogenetic study published in 2023 concluded that the southernmost three species of Primulina, endemic to the Langbiang Plateau in southern Vietnam, constitute a separate genus which was named Langbiangia.

== Species ==
232 species are accepted.

- Primulina alba R.F.Li & B.Pan
- Primulina albicalyx B.Pan & Li H.Yang
- Primulina alutacea F.Wen, B.Pan & B.M.Wang
- Primulina anisocymosa F.Wen, Xin Hong & Z.J.Qiu
- Primulina arcuata G.L.Xu & L.Ding
- Primulina argentea Xin Hong, F.Wen & S.B.Zhou
- Primulina atroglandulosa (W.T.Wang) Mich.Möller & A.Weber
- Primulina atropurpurea (W.T.Wang) Mich.Möller & A.Weber
- Primulina baishouensis (Y.G.Wei, H.Q.Wen & S.H.Zhong) Yin Z.Wang
- Primulina balansae (Drake) Mich.Möller & A.Weber
- Primulina beiliuensis B.Pan & S.X.Huang
- Primulina bicolor (W.T.Wang) Mich.Möller & A.Weber
- Primulina bipinnatifida (W.T.Wang) Yin Z.Wang & J.M.Li
- Primulina bobaiensis Q.K.Li, Qiang Zhang & Wen L.Li
- Primulina bogneriana (B.L.Burtt) Mich.Möller & A.Weber
- Primulina brachystigma (W.T.Wang) Mich.Möller & A.Weber
- Primulina brachytricha (W.T.Wang & D.Y.Chen) R.B.Mao & Yin Z.Wang
- Primulina brassicoides (W.T.Wang) Mich.Möller & A.Weber
- Primulina bullata S.N.Lu & F.Wen
- Primulina cangwuensis Xin Hong & F.Wen
- Primulina carinata Y.G.Wei, F.Wen & H.Z.Lü
- Primulina carnosifolia (C.Y.Wu ex H.W.Li) Yin Z.Wang
- Primulina cataractarum X.L.Yu & A.Liu
- Primulina cerina F.Wen, Yi Huang & W.C.Chou
- Primulina chingipengii W.B.Xu & K.F.Chung
- Primulina chizhouensis Xin Hong, S.B.Zhou & F.Wen
- Primulina clausa P.W.Li & M.Kang
- Primulina colaniae (Pellegr.) Mich.Möller & A.Weber
- Primulina confertiflora (W.T.Wang) Mich.Möller & A.Weber
- Primulina cordata Mich.Möller & A.Weber
- Primulina cordifolia (D.Fang & W.T.Wang) Yin Z.Wang
- Primulina cordistigma F.Wen, B.D.Lai & B.M.Wang
- Primulina crassifolia (Aver. & K.S.Nguyen) T.P.Anh, F.Wen & Mich.Möller
- Primulina crassirhizoma F.Wen, Bo Zhao & Xin Hong
- Primulina crassituba (W.T.Wang) Mich.Möller & A.Weber
- Primulina cruciformis (Chun) Mich.Möller & A.Weber
- Primulina curvituba B.Pan, L.H.Yang & M.Kang
- Primulina danxiaensis (W.B.Liao, S.S.Lin & R.J.Shen) W.B.Liao & K.F.Chung
- Primulina davidioides F.Wen & Xin Hong
- Primulina debaoensis N.Jiang & Hong Li
- Primulina demissa (Hance) Mich.Möller & A.Weber
- Primulina depressa (Hook.f.) Mich.Möller & A.Weber
- Primulina dichroantha F.Wen, Y.G.Wei & S.B.Zhou
- Primulina diffusa Xin Hong, F.Wen & S.B.Zhou
- Primulina dongguanica F.Wen, Y.G.Wei & R.Q.Luo
- Primulina drakei (B.L.Burtt) Mich.Möller & A.Weber
- Primulina dryas (Dunn) Mich.Möller & A.Weber
- Primulina duanensis F.Wen & S.L.Huang
- Primulina eburnea (Hance) Yin Z.Wang
- Primulina effusa F.Wen & B.Pan
- Primulina elegans B. M. Wang, Y. H. Tong & N. H. Xia
- Primulina fangdingii B.M.Wang, B.Pan & B.D.Lai
- Primulina fangii (W.T.Wang) Mich.Möller & A.Weber
- Primulina fengkaiensis Z.L.Ning & M.Kang
- Primulina fengshanensis F.Wen & Yue Wang
- Primulina fimbrisepala (Hand.-Mazz.) Yin Z.Wang
- Primulina flavimaculata (W.T.Wang) Mich.Möller & A.Weber
- Primulina flexusa F.Wen, T.Peng & B.Pan
- Primulina floribunda (W.T.Wang) Mich.Möller & A.Weber
- Primulina fordii (Hemsl.) Yin Z.Wang
- Primulina gemella (D.Wood) Yin Z.Wang
- Primulina gigantea F.Wen, B.Pan & W.H.Luo
- Primulina glabrescens (W.T.Wang & D.Y.Chen) Mich.Möller & A.Weber
- Primulina glandaceistriata X.X.Zhu, F.Wen & H.Sun
- Primulina glandulosa (D.Fang, L.Zeng & D.H.Qin) Yin Z.Wang
- Primulina gongchengensis Y.S.Huang & Yan Liu
- Primulina gracilipes X.L.Yu & A.Liu
- Primulina grandibracteata (J.M.Li & Mich.Möller) Mich.Möller & A.Weber
- Primulina gueilinensis (W.T.Wang) Yin Z.Wang & Yan Liu
- Primulina guigangensis L.Wu & Qiang Zhang
- Primulina guihaiensis (Y.G.Wei, B.Pan & W.X.Tang) Mich.Möller & A.Weber
- Primulina guizhongensis Bo Zhao, B.Pan & F.Wen
- Primulina halongensis (Kiew & T.H.Nguyên) Mich.Möller & A.Weber
- Primulina hedyotidea (Chun) Yin Z.Wang
- Primulina hengshanensis L.H.Liu & K.M.Liu
- Primulina heterochroa F.Wen & B.D.Lai
- Primulina heterotricha (Merr.) Y.Dong & Yin Z.Wang
- Primulina hezhouensis (W.H.Wu & W.B.Xu) W.B.Xu & K.F.Chung
- Primulina hiemalis Xin Hong & F.Wen
- Primulina hiepii (Kiew) Mich.Möller & A.Weber
- Primulina hochiensis (C.C.Huang & X.X.Chen) Mich.Möller & A.Weber
- Primulina huaijiensis Z.L.Ning & Jing Wang
- Primulina huangii F.Wen & Z.B.Xin
- Primulina huangjiniana W.B.Liao, Q.Fan & C.Y.Huang
- Primulina hunanensis K.M.Liu & X.Z.Cai
- Primulina inflata Li H.Yang & M.Z.Xu
- Primulina jianghuaensis K.M.Liu & X.Z.Cai
- Primulina jiangyongensis X.L.Yu & Ming Li
- Primulina jingxiensis (Yan Liu, W.B.Xu & H.S.Gao) W.B.Xu & K.F.Chung
- Primulina jiulianshanensis F.Wen & G.L.Xu
- Primulina jiuwanshanica (W.T.Wang) Yin Z.Wang
- Primulina jiuyishanica Kun Liu, D.C.Meng & Z.B.Xin
- Primulina juliae (Hance) Mich.Möller & A.Weber
- Primulina langshanica (W.T.Wang) Yin Z.Wang
- Primulina latinervis (W.T.Wang) Mich.Möller & A.Weber
- Primulina lechangensis Xin Hong, F.Wen & S.B.Zhou
- Primulina leeii (F.Wen, Yue Wang & Q.X.Zhang) Mich.Möller & A.Weber
- Primulina leiophylla (W.T.Wang) Yin Z.Wang
- Primulina leiyyi F.Wen, Z.B.Xin & W.C.Chou
- Primulina lepingensis Z.L.Ning & Ming Kang
- Primulina leprosa (Yan Liu & W.B.Xu) W.B.Xu & K.F.Chung
- Primulina lianchengensis B.J.Ye & S.P.Chen
- Primulina liangwaniae B.M.Wang & Y.H.Tong
- Primulina lianpingensis Li Hua Yang, H.H.Kong & M.Kang
- Primulina liboensis (W.T.Wang & D.Y.Chen) Mich.Möller & A.Weber
- Primulina lienxienensis (W.T.Wang) Mich.Möller & A.Weber
- Primulina liguliformis (W.T.Wang) Mich.Möller & A.Weber
- Primulina lijiangensis (B.Pan & W.B.Xu) W.B.Xu & K.F.Chung
- Primulina linearicalyx F.Wen, B.D.Lai & Y.G.Wei
- Primulina linearifolia (W.T.Wang) Yin Z.Wang
- Primulina lingchuanensis (Yan Liu & Y.G.Wei) Mich.Möller & A.Weber
- Primulina linglingensis (W.T.Wang) Mich.Möller & A.Weber
- Primulina liujiangensis (D.Fang & D.H.Qin) Yan Liu
- Primulina lobulata (W.T.Wang) Mich.Möller & A.Weber
- Primulina longgangensis (W.T.Wang) Yan Liu & Yin Z.Wang
- Primulina longicalyx (J.M.Li & Yin Z.Wang) Mich.Möller & A.Weber
- Primulina longii (Z.Yu Li) Z.Yu Li
- Primulina longzhouensis (B.Pan & W.H.Wu) W.B.Xu & K.F.Chung
- Primulina lunglinensis (W.T.Wang) Mich.Möller & A.Weber
- Primulina lungzhouensis (W.T.Wang) Mich.Möller & A.Weber
- Primulina luochengensis (Yan Liu & W.B.Xu) Mich.Möller & A.Weber
- Primulina lutea (Yan Liu & Y.G.Wei) Mich.Möller & A.Weber
- Primulina lutescens B.Pan & H.S.Ma
- Primulina lutvittata F.Wen & Y.G.Wei
- Primulina luzhaiensis (Yan Liu, Y.S.Huang & W.B.Xu) Mich.Möller & A.Weber
- Primulina mabaensis K.F.Chung & W.B.Xu
- Primulina maciejewskii F.Wen, R.L.Zhang & A.Q.Dong
- Primulina macrodonta (D.Fang & D.H.Qin) Mich.Möller & A.Weber
- Primulina macrorhiza (D.Fang & D.H.Qin) Mich.Möller & A.Weber
- Primulina maguanensis (Z.Yu Li, H.Jiang & H.Xu) Mich.Möller & A.Weber
- Primulina malingheensis X.X.Bai, F.Wen & Y.L.Zhou
- Primulina malipoensis Li H.Yang & M.Kang
- Primulina medica (D.Fang) Yin Z.Wang
- Primulina melanofilamenta Y.Liu & F.Wen
- Primulina minor F.Wen & Y.G.Wei
- Primulina minutimaculata (D.Fang & W.T.Wang) Yin Z.Wang
- Primulina modesta (Kiew & T.H.Nguyên) Mich.Möller & A.Weber
- Primulina moi F.Wen & Y.G.Wei
- Primulina mollifolia (D.Fang & W.T Wang) J.M.Li & Yin Z.Wang
- Primulina multifida B.Pan & K.F.Chung
- Primulina nana C.Xiong, W.C.Chou & F.Wen
- Primulina nandanensis (S.X.Huang, Y.G.Wei & W.H.Luo) Mich.Möller & A.Weber
- Primulina napoensis (Z.Yu Li) Mich.Möller & A.Weber
- Primulina ningmingensis (Yan Liu & W.H.Wu) W.B.Xu & K.F.Chung
- Primulina niveolanosa F.Wen, S.Li & W.C.Chou
- Primulina nymphaeoides Y.G.Wei & W.C.Chou
- Primulina obtusidentata (W.T.Wang) Mich.Möller & A.Weber
- Primulina ophiopogoides (D.Fang & W.T.Wang) Yin Z.Wang
- Primulina orthandra (W.T.Wang) Mich.Möller & A.Weber
- Primulina papillosa Z.B.Xin, W.C.Chou & F.Wen
- Primulina parvifolia (W.T.Wang) Yin Z.Wang & J.M.Li
- Primulina pengii W.B.Xu & K.F.Chung
- Primulina persica F.Wen, Yi Huang & W.C.Chou
- Primulina petrocosmeoides B.Pan & F.Wen
- Primulina pingleensis Ying Qin & Yan Liu
- Primulina pingnanensis Xin Hong, Z.L.Li & W.C.Chou
- Primulina pinnata (W.T.Wang) Yin Z.Wang
- Primulina pinnatifida (Hand.-Mazz.) Yin Z.Wang
- Primulina polycephala (Chun) Mich.Möller & A.Weber
- Primulina porphyrea X.L.Yu & Ming Li
- Primulina pseudoeburnea (D.Fang & W.T.Wang) Mich.Möller & A.Weber
- Primulina pseudoglandulosa W.B.Xu & K.F.Chung
- Primulina pseudoheterotricha (T.J.Zhou, B.Pan & W.B.Xu) Mich.Möller & A.Weber
- Primulina pseudomollifolia W.B.Xu & Yan Liu
- Primulina pseudoroseoalba Jian Li, F.Wen & L.J.Yan
- Primulina pteropoda (W.T.Wang) Yan Liu
- Primulina pungentisepala (W.T.Wang) Mich.Möller & A.Weber
- Primulina purpurea F.Wen, Bo Zhao & Y.G.Wei
- Primulina purpureokylin F.Wen, Yi Huang & W.C.Chou
- Primulina qingyuanensis Z.L.Ning & Ming Kang
- Primulina qintangensis Z.B.Xin, W.C.Chou & F.Wen
- Primulina quanbaensis Aver., K.S.Nguyen, T.P.Anh & F.Wen
- Primulina renifolia (D.Fang & D.H.Qin) J.M.Li & Yin Z.Wang
- Primulina repanda (W.T.Wang) Yin Z.Wang
- Primulina ronganensis (D.Fang & Y.G.Wei) Mich.Möller & A.Weber
- Primulina rongshuiensis (Yan Liu & Y.S.Huang) W.B.Xu & K.F.Chung
- Primulina roseoalba (W.T.Wang) Mich.Möller & A.Weber
- Primulina rosulata (F.Wen & Y.G.Wei) Z.L.Ning & X.Y.Zhuang
- Primulina rotundifolia (Hemsl.) Mich.Möller & A.Weber
- Primulina rubella L.H.Yang & M.Kang
- Primulina rubribracteata Z.L.Ning & M.Kang
- Primulina rufipes Y.L.Su, P.Yang & Yan Liu
- Primulina sclerophylla (W.T.Wang) Yan Liu
- Primulina secundiflora (Chun) Mich.Möller & A.Weber
- Primulina semicontorta (Pellegr.) Mich.Möller & A.Weber
- Primulina serrulata R.B.Zhang & F.Wen
- Primulina shaowuensis X.X.Su, Liang Ma & S.P.Chen
- Primulina shouchengensis (Z.Yu Li) Z.Yu Li
- Primulina sichuanensis (W.T.Wang) Mich.Möller & A.Weber
- Primulina silaniae X.X.Bai & F.Wen
- Primulina sinovietnamica W.H.Wu & Qiang Zhang
- Primulina skogiana (Z.Yu Li) Mich.Möller & A.Weber
- Primulina spadiciformis (W.T.Wang) Mich.Möller & A.Weber
- Primulina speluncae (Hand.-Mazz.) Mich.Möller & A.Weber
- Primulina spinulosa (D.Fang & W.T.Wang) Yin Z.Wang
- Primulina spiradiclioides Z.B.Xin & F.Wen
- Primulina subrhomboidea (W.T.Wang) Yin Z.Wang
- Primulina subulata (W.T.Wang) Mich.Möller & A.Weber
- Primulina subulatisepala (W.T.Wang) Mich.Möller & A.Weber
- Primulina suichuanensis X.L.Yu & J.J.Zhou
- Primulina swinglei (Merr.) Mich.Möller & A.Weber
- Primulina tabacum Hance
- Primulina tenuifolia (W.T.Wang) Yin Z.Wang
- Primulina tenuituba (W.T.Wang) Yin Z.Wang
- Primulina tiandengensis (F.Wen & H.Tang) F.Wen & K.F.Chung
- Primulina titan Z.B.Xin, W.C.Chou & F.Wen
- Primulina tribracteata (W.T.Wang) Mich.Möller & A.Weber
- Primulina tsoongii H.L.Liang, Bo Zhao & F.Wen
- Primulina varicolor (D.Fang & D.H.Qin) Yin Z.Wang
- Primulina verecunda (Chun) Mich.Möller & A.Weber
- Primulina versicolor F.Wen, B.Pan & B.M.Wang
- Primulina vestita (D.Wood) Mich.Möller & A.Weber
- Primulina villosissima (W.T.Wang) Mich.Möller & A.Weber
- Primulina wangiana (Z.Yu Li) Mich.Möller & A.Weber
- Primulina weii Mich.Möller & A.Weber
- Primulina wenii Jian Li & L.J.Yan
- Primulina wentsaii (D.Fang & L.Zeng) Yin Z.Wang
- Primulina wuae F.Wen & L.F.Fu
- Primulina xinningensis (W.T.Wang) Mich.Möller & A.Weber
- Primulina xiuningensis (X.L.Liu & X.H.Guo) Mich.Möller & A.Weber
- Primulina xiziae F.Wen, Yue Wang & G.J.Hua
- Primulina xuansonensis W.H.Chen & Y.M.Shui
- Primulina yandongensis Ying Qin & Yan Liu
- Primulina yangchunensis Y.L.Zheng & Y.F.Deng
- Primulina yangshanensis W.B.Xu & B.Pan
- Primulina yangshuoensis Y.G.Wei & F.Wen
- Primulina yingdeensis Z.L.Ning, M.Kang & X.Y.Zhuang
- Primulina yulinensis Ying Qin & Yan Liu
- Primulina yungfuensis (W.T.Wang) Mich.Möller & A.Weber
- Primulina zixingensis L.H.Yang & B.Pan

=== Formerly placed here ===
- Langbiangia annamensis (Pellegr.) Luu, C.L.Hsieh & K.F.Chung (as P. annamensis (Pellegr.) Mich.Möller & A.Weber)
- Langbiangia poilanei (Pellegr.) Luu, C.L.Hsieh & K.F.Chung (as P. poilanei (Pellegr.) Mich.Möller & A.Weber)
- Langbiangia scutellifolia (Luu, N.L.Vu & T.Q.T.Nguyen) Luu, C.L.Hsieh & K.F.Chung (as P. scutellifolia Luu, N.L.Vu & T.Q.T.Nguyen)
- Metapetrocosmea cycnostyla (B.L.Burtt) Yin Z.Wang & P.W.Li (as P. cycnostyla (B.L.Burtt) Mich.Möller & A.Weber)
- Metapetrocosmea cyrtocarpa (D.Fang & L.Zeng) Yin Z.Wang & P.W.Li (as P. cyrtocarpa (D.Fang & L.Zeng) Mich.Möller & A.Weber)
- Metapetrocosmea eberhardtii (Pellegr.) Yin Z.Wang & P.W.Li (as P. eberhardtii (Pellegr.) Mich.Möller & A.Weber)
- Metapetrocosmea minutihamata (D.Wood) Yin Z.Wang & P.W.Li (as P. minutihamata (D.Wood) Mich.Möller & A.Weber)
- Metapetrocosmea tamiana (B.L.Burtt) Yin Z.Wang & P.W.Li (as P. tamiana (B.L.Burtt) Mich.Möller & A.Weber)
