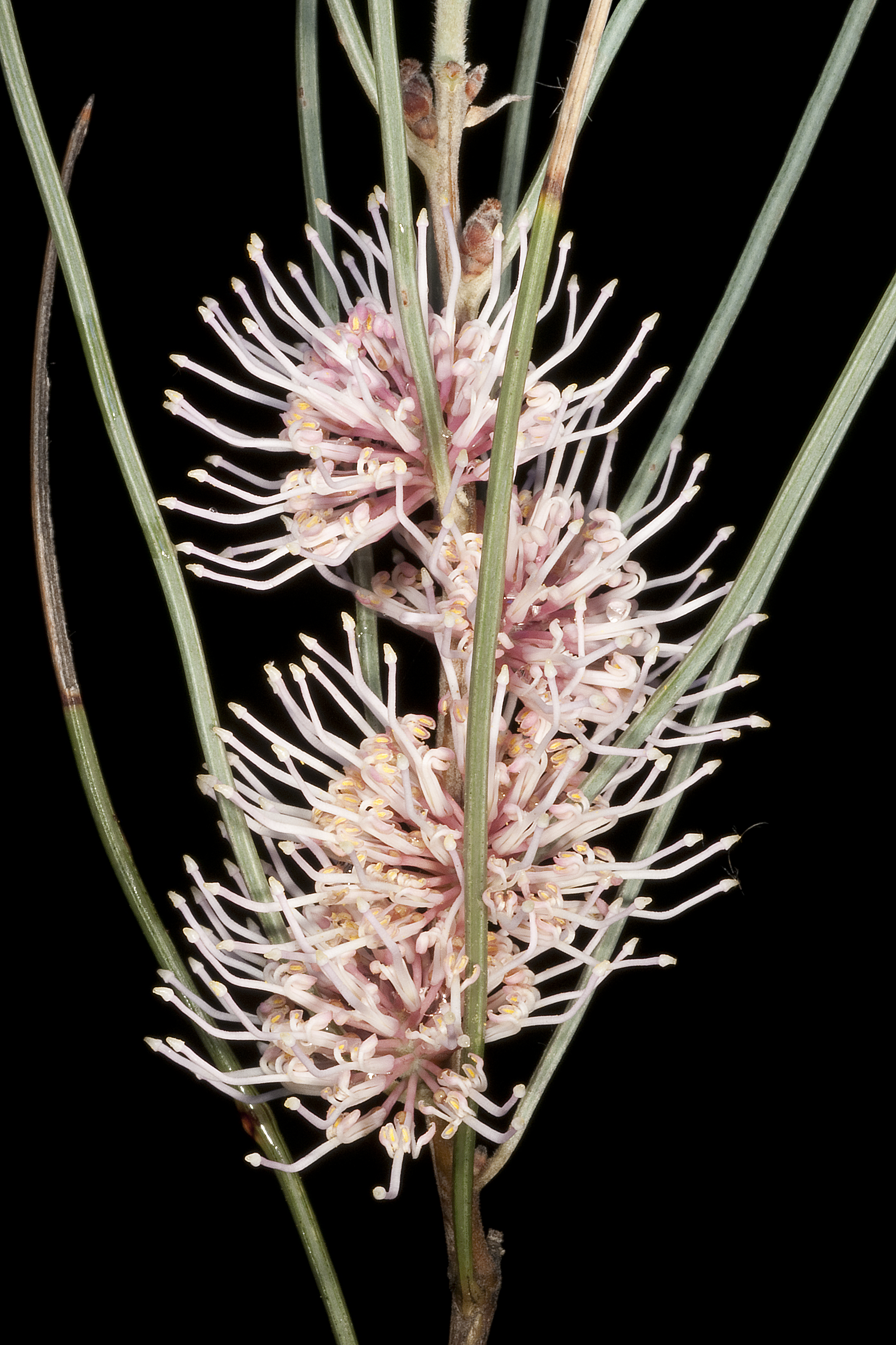

Scientific classification
- Kingdom: Plantae
- Clade: Tracheophytes
- Clade: Angiosperms
- Clade: Eudicots
- Order: Proteales
- Family: Proteaceae
- Genus: Hakea
- Species: H. invaginata

Binomial name
- Hakea invaginata B.L.Burtt
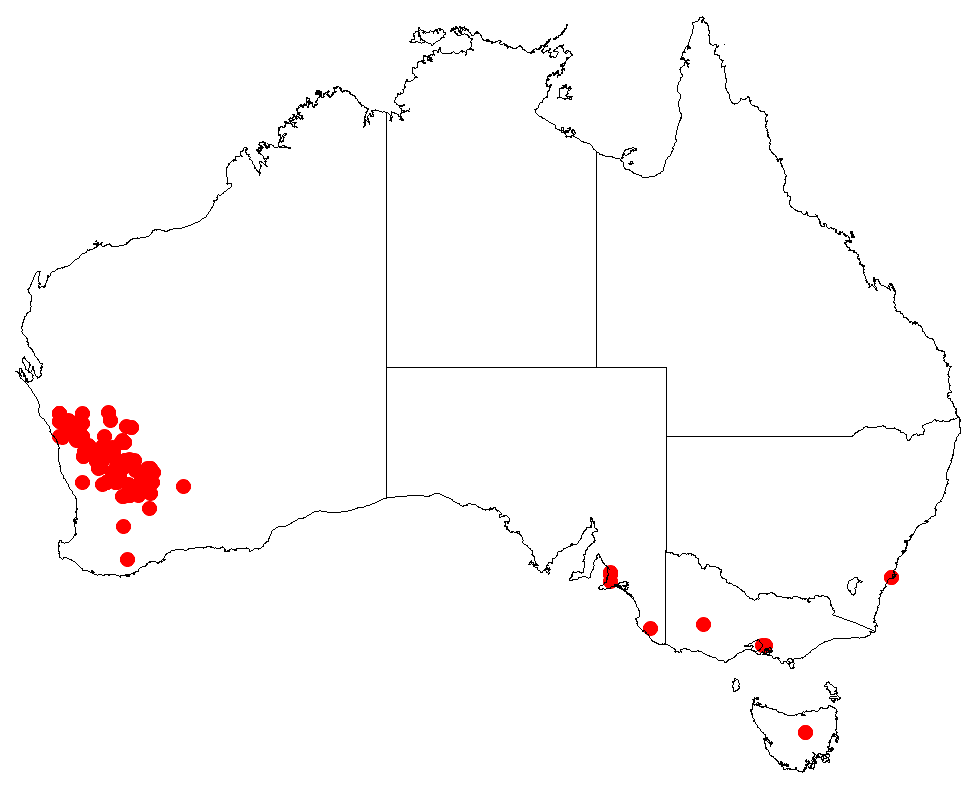
- Occurrence data from AVH

= Hakea invaginata =

Species of shrub endemic to Western Australia

Hakea invaginata is a shrub in the family Proteaceae and is endemic to Western Australia. It has purplish-pink flowers, smooth needle-shaped leaves and the branchlets are thickly covered in hairs.

== Description ==
Hakea invaginata is a spreading shrub typically growing to a height of 1.5 to 3 metres (5 to 10 ft) and does not form a lignotuber. The branchlets are densely covered in fine matted hairs. The terete evergreen leaves have five deep narrow grooves running through the entirety of their length. The leaves are glabrous on their face and have a length of 7 to 22 centimetres (2.8 to 8.7 in) and a diameter of 1.2 to 1.5 millimetres (0.047 to 0.059 in). It blooms from June to September and produces pink-purple flowers. Each solitary axillary inflorescence has an umbelliform raceme and is grouped to form a long brush-like structure containing 60 to 80 flowers along the axil. The perianth is most often pink and less often is white. The pistil has a length of 10 to 12.5 mm (0.394 to 0.492 in) with a sub-globular gland. Following flowering one to six stalked fruits will form per axil. Fruits have an obliquely elliptic shape that is sometimes curved with a length of 1.6 to 2.2 cm (0.63 to 0.87 in) and a width of 0.8 to 1.1 cm (0.315 to 0.433 in). The light to dark brown seeds within have blackish patches. Each seed has an obliquely ovate to elliptic shape and a length of 11 to 14 mm (0.433 to 0.551 in) and a width of 5 to 6 mm (0.197 to 0.236 in) with a wing down both sides of the body.

== Taxonomy ==
Hakea invaginata was first formally described by the botanist Brian Burtt in 1950 as part of the work Hooker's Icones Plantarum. Known synonyms are Hakea invaginata var. invaginata, Hakea sulcata var. intermedia and Hakea invaginata var. pachycarpa.

The specific epithet is taken from the Latin word invaginatus meaning enclose or fold in, referring to the longitudinally grooved leaves.

== Distribution ==
It is endemic to an area in the Wheatbelt and Mid West regions of Western Australia from around Northampton in the north west to Mount Magnet in the northeast to around Merredin in the south and grows in sandy, loamy or gravelly soils. It is often found on sandplains where it is part of shrubland communities that are dominated by species of Acacia or Melaleuca.
