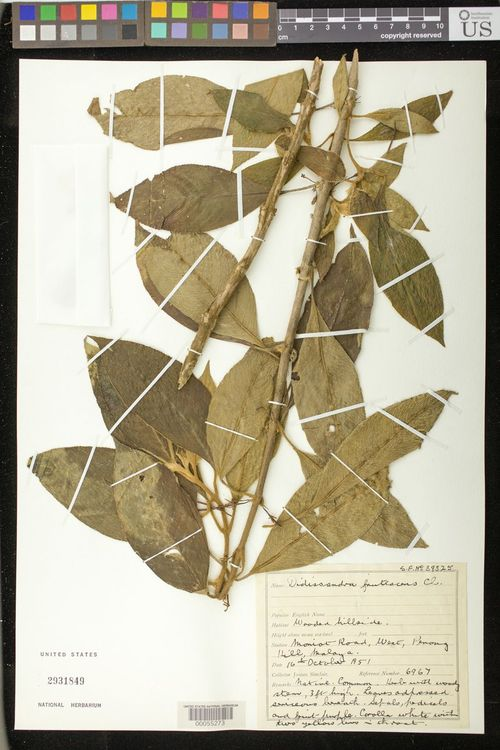

Scientific classification
- Kingdom: Plantae
- Clade: Embryophytes
- Clade: Tracheophytes
- Clade: Spermatophytes
- Clade: Angiosperms
- Clade: Eudicots
- Clade: Asterids
- Order: Lamiales
- Family: Gesneriaceae
- Genus: Didissandra
- Species: D. frutescens

Binomial name
- Didissandra frutescens (Jack) C.B.Clarke

Synonyms
- Didymocarpus frutescens Jack; Henckelia frutescens Spreng.

= Didissandra frutescens =

Species of flowering plant

Didissandra frutescens is a species of flowering plant in the family Gesneriaceae. It is native to Malaysia, and was first described in 1820.

== Distribution ==
Didissandra frutescens is native to the wet tropical biome of Peninsular Malaysia (Penang and Perak).

== Taxonomy ==
The species was described by William Jack, as Didymocarpus frutescens, in 1820. In 1827, Kurt Polycarp Joachim Sprengel moved the species to Henckelia. In 1883, Charles Baron Clarke gave the species its current name.

== Description ==
Didissandra frutescens has broad, oblanceolate leaves, which are 24 centimetres (9.4 in) long, and 7 centimetres (2.8 in) long.
