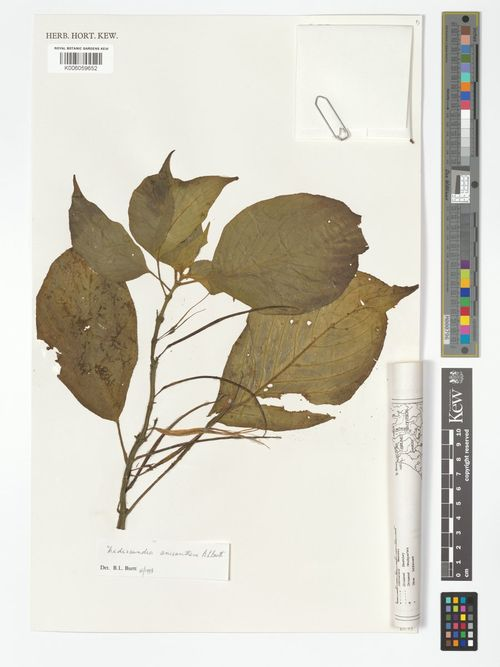

Scientific classification
- Kingdom: Plantae
- Clade: Tracheophytes
- Clade: Angiosperms
- Clade: Eudicots
- Clade: Asterids
- Order: Lamiales
- Family: Gesneriaceae
- Genus: Didissandra
- Species: D. anisanthera

Binomial name
- Didissandra anisanthera B.L.Burtt

= Didissandra anisanthera =

Species of flowering plant

Didissandra anisanthera is a species of flowering plant in the family Gesneriaceae. It is a shrub or subshrub.

Didissandra anisanthera is native to the wet tropical biome of Sarawak, Borneo. The species was described by Brian Laurence Burtt in 1982.
