= Primulina gemella =

Conservation status
- Least Concern (IUCN 3.1)

Scientific classification
- Kingdom: Plantae
- Clade: Embryophytes
- Clade: Tracheophytes
- Clade: Spermatophytes
- Clade: Angiosperms
- Clade: Eudicots
- Clade: Asterids
- Order: Lamiales
- Family: Gesneriaceae
- Genus: Primulina
- Species: P. gemella

Binomial name
- Primulina gemella (D.Wood) Yin Z.Wang

Synonyms
- Chirita gemella D.Wood

Species of flowering plant

Primulina gemella is a plant in the family Gesneriaceae, native to Vietnam. The species was formerly placed in the genus Chirita.

== Description ==
Primulina gemella grows as a perennial herb, with a rhizome measuring up to 7 centimetres (3 in) long. Its leaves are dark green above, whitish green below and measure up to 5 cm (2 in) long. Mauve flowers grow singly, only the type specimen had an inflorescence.

== Distribution and habitat ==
Primulina gemella is endemic to Vietnam, where it is confined to the islands of Hạ Long Bay, a UNESCO World Heritage Site. In 2000, the species was considered confined to a single island, but by 2012 had been found on numerous islands. Its habitat is on soil-covered limestone rocks.
