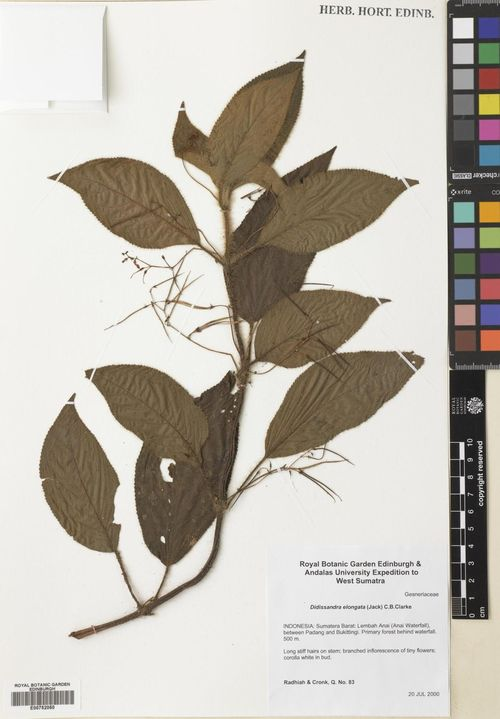

Scientific classification
- Kingdom: Plantae
- Clade: Embryophytes
- Clade: Tracheophytes
- Clade: Spermatophytes
- Clade: Angiosperms
- Clade: Eudicots
- Clade: Asterids
- Order: Lamiales
- Family: Gesneriaceae
- Genus: Didissandra
- Species: D. elongata

Binomial name
- Didissandra elongata (Jack) C.B.Clarke

Subspecies
- Didissandra elongata ssp. burleyi; Didissandra elongata ssp. elongata; Didissandra elongata ssp. minor; Didissandra elongata ssp. montana

Synonyms
- Didymocarpus elongatus Jack; Henckelia elongata (Jack) Spreng.

= Didissandra elongata =

Species of flowering plant

Didissandra elongata is a species of flowering plant in the family Gesneriaceae.

Didissandra elongata is a subshrub. The species is native to the wet tropical biome of Sumatra and Java.

== Taxonomy ==
In 1823, William Jack described the species as Didymocarpus elongatus. In 1827, Kurt Polycarp Joachim Sprengel moved it to the genus Henckelia. The species was given its current name by Charles Baron Clarke, in 1883.

Four subspecies are recognised.
