= Primulina swinglei =

Scientific classification
- Kingdom: Plantae
- Clade: Tracheophytes
- Clade: Angiosperms
- Clade: Eudicots
- Clade: Asterids
- Order: Lamiales
- Family: Gesneriaceae
- Genus: Primulina
- Species: P. swinglei

Binomial name
- Primulina swinglei (Merr.) Mich.Möller & A.Weber

Synonyms
- Chirita elegans Merrill; Chirita swinglei (Merr.) W.T. Wang; Didymocarpus swinglei Merr.

Species of flowering plant

Primulina swinglei is a species of plants in the family Gesneriaceae. It is found in China and Vietnam.
