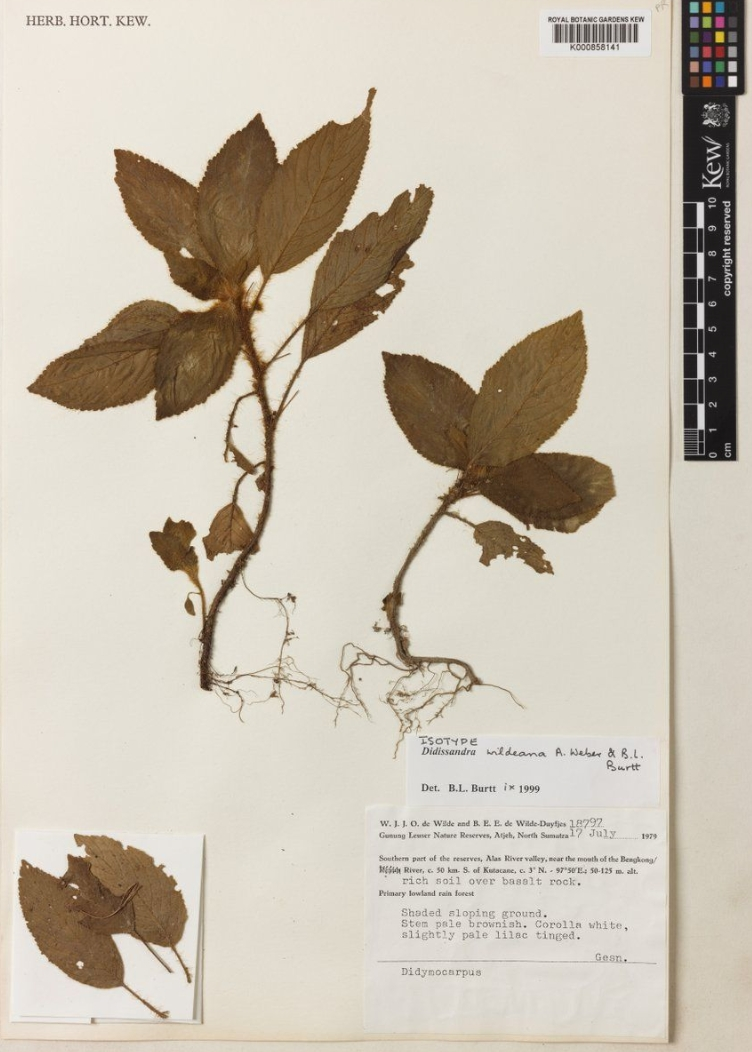

Scientific classification
- Kingdom: Plantae
- Clade: Embryophytes
- Clade: Tracheophytes
- Clade: Spermatophytes
- Clade: Angiosperms
- Clade: Eudicots
- Clade: Asterids
- Order: Lamiales
- Family: Gesneriaceae
- Genus: Didissandra
- Species: D. wildeana

Binomial name
- Didissandra wildeana A.Weber & B.L.Burtt

= Didissandra wildeana =

Species of flowering plant

Didissandra wildeana is a species of flowering plant in the family Gesneriaceae. It is a subshrub native to Sumatra. The species was described in 1998.

== Distribution ==
Didissandra wildeana is native to the wet tropical biome of northern Sumatra.

== Taxonomy ==
Anton Weber and Brian Laurence Burtt described the species in 1998. The type material was collected in 1979, in the Alas River valley, Sumatra.
