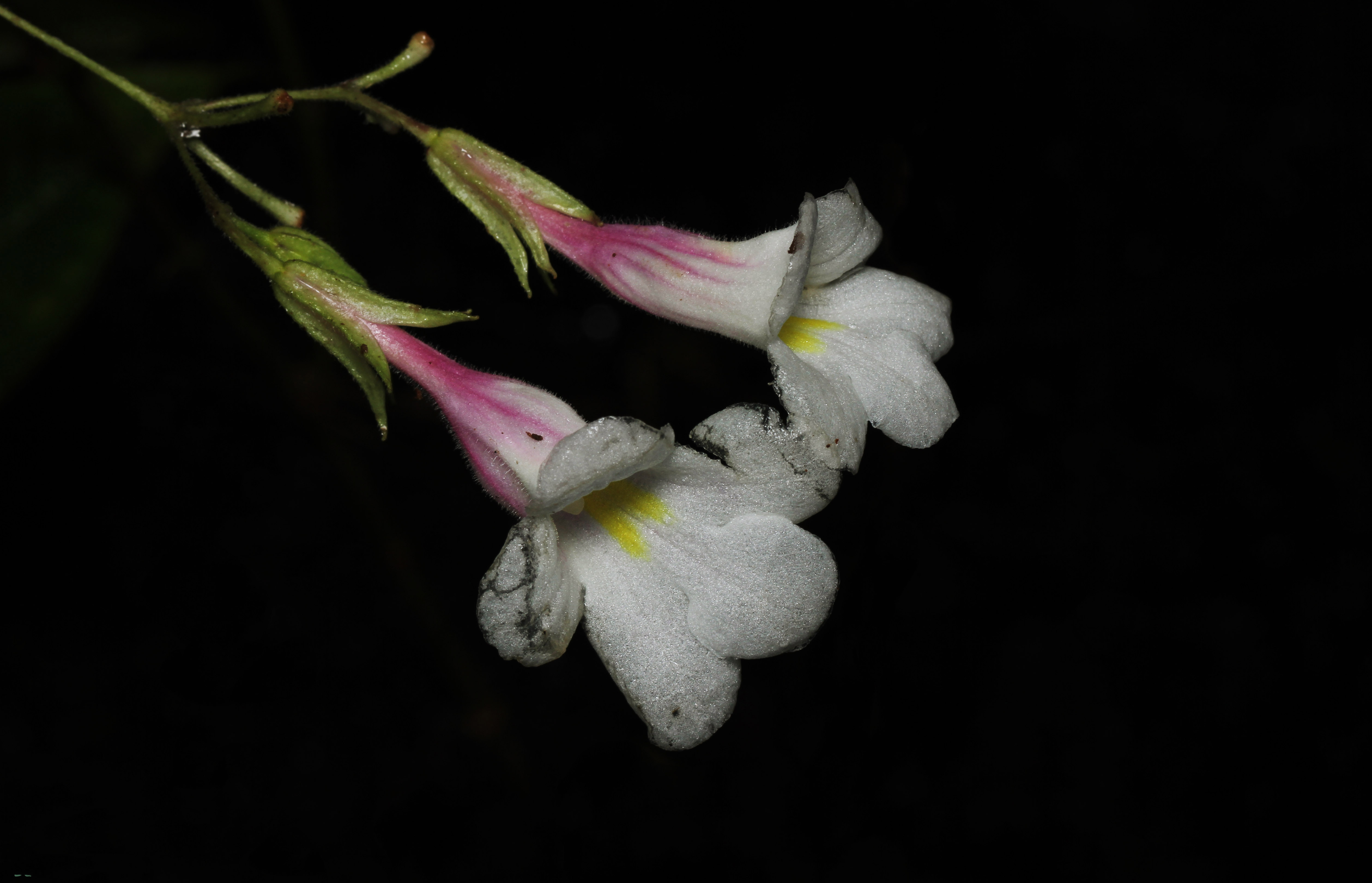

Scientific classification
- Kingdom: Plantae
- Clade: Tracheophytes
- Clade: Angiosperms
- Clade: Eudicots
- Clade: Asterids
- Order: Lamiales
- Family: Gesneriaceae
- Genus: Henckelia
- Species: H. wijesundarae

Binomial name
- Henckelia wijesundarae Ranasinghe et al., 2016

= Henckelia wijesundarae =

Species of flowering plant

Henckelia wijesundarae is a species of flowering plants in the family Gesneriaceae. It is endemic to Sri Lanka.
