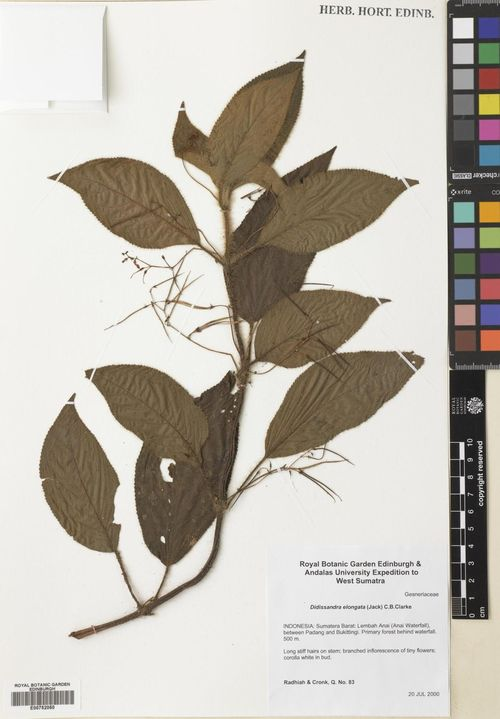
- Didissandra elongata

Scientific classification
- Kingdom: Plantae
- Clade: Embryophytes
- Clade: Tracheophytes
- Clade: Spermatophytes
- Clade: Angiosperms
- Clade: Eudicots
- Clade: Asterids
- Order: Lamiales
- Family: Gesneriaceae
- Genus: Didissandra; C.B.Clarke (1883), nom. cons.

Species
- 8; see text

Synonyms
- Ellobum Blume (1826)

= Didissandra =

Genus of plants

Didissandra is a genus of flowering plants belonging to the family Gesneriaceae. It includes eight species native to Western Malesia, ranging from Peninsular Malaysia to Sumatra, Java, and Borneo.

Species:

- Didissandra anisanthera B.L.Burtt
- Didissandra brachycarpa A.Weber & B.L.Burtt
- Didissandra elongata (Jack) C.B.Clarke
- Didissandra frutescens (Jack) C.B.Clarke
- Didissandra sprengelii C.B.Clarke
- Didissandra ternata (Miq.) A.Weber & B.L.Burtt
- Didissandra triflora C.B.Clarke
- Didissandra wildeana A.Weber & B.L.Burtt
