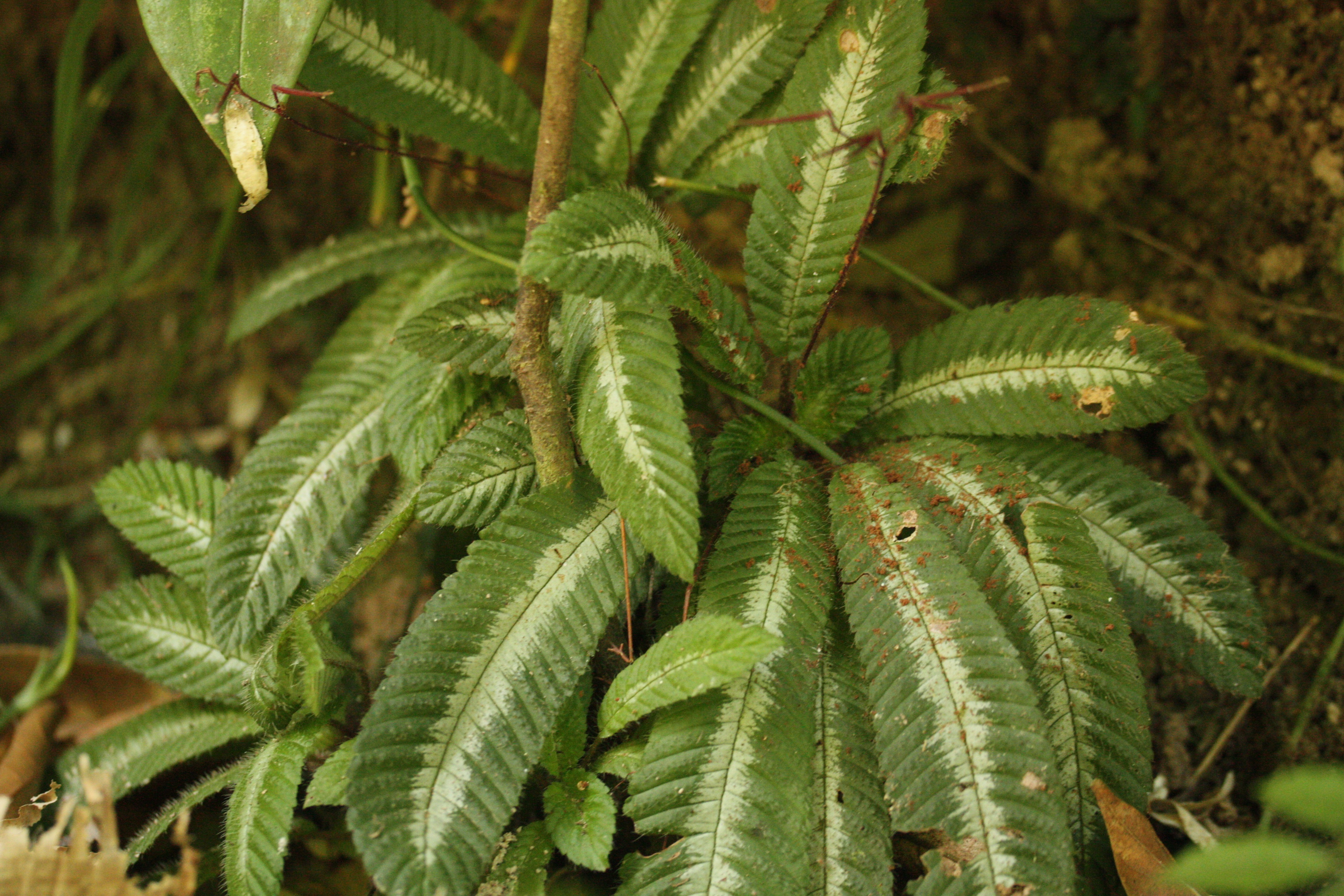
- Codonoboea woodii

Scientific classification
- Kingdom: Plantae
- Clade: Tracheophytes
- Clade: Angiosperms
- Clade: Eudicots
- Clade: Asterids
- Order: Lamiales
- Family: Gesneriaceae
- Genus: Codonoboea; Ridl. (1923)

Species
- 129; see text

Synonyms
- Platyadenia B.L.Burtt (1971)

= Codonoboea =

Genus of flowering plants

Codonoboea is a genus of flowering plants in the family Gesneriaceae. It includes 129 species which range from Myanmar and Thailand through northern Malesia (Peninsular Malaysia, Sumatra, Borneo, Sulawesi, the Philippines, and Maluku) to New Guinea.

Many of its species were formerly placed in the genus Henckelia.

== Species ==
129 species are accepted.

- Codonoboea alba (Ridl.) C.L.Lim
- Codonoboea albina (Ridl.) Kiew
- Codonoboea albomarginata (Hemsl.) Kiew
- Codonoboea alternans (Ridl.) Kiew
- Codonoboea alternifolia (C.B.Clarke) A.Weber
- Codonoboea amoena (C.B.Clarke) A.Weber
- Codonoboea angustifolia (C.B.Clarke) A.Weber
- Codonoboea anthonyi (Kiew) C.L.Lim
- Codonoboea appressipilosa (B.L.Burtt) D.J.Middleton
- Codonoboea ascendens (Ridl.) C.L.Lim
- Codonoboea atrosanguinea (Ridl.) C.L.Lim
- Codonoboea bakoensis (B.L.Burtt) A.Weber
- Codonoboea battamensis (Ridl.) A.Weber
- Codonoboea beccarii (C.B.Clarke) A.Weber
- Codonoboea bombycina (Ridl.) C.L.Lim
- Codonoboea breviflora (Ridl.) Kiew
- Codonoboea bullata (C.B.Clarke) A.Weber
- Codonoboea caelestis Ridl.
- Codonoboea calcarea (Ridl.) Kiew
- Codonoboea castaneifolia (Ridl.) Kiew
- Codonoboea codonion (Kiew) C.L.Lim
- Codonoboea corneri (Kiew) Kiew
- Codonoboea corniculata (Jack) D.J.Middleton
- Codonoboea corrugata (Mendum) D.J.Middleton
- Codonoboea craspedodroma (Kiew) Kiew
- Codonoboea crenata (Baker) A.Weber
- Codonoboea crinita (Jack) C.L.Lim
- Codonoboea crocea (Ridl.) C.L.Lim
- Codonoboea curtisii (Ridl.) C.L.Lim
- Codonoboea davisonii (Kiew) Kiew
- Codonoboea dawnii (Kiew) Kiew
- Codonoboea densifolia (Ridl.) C.L.Lim
- Codonoboea dentata (Ridl.) A.Weber
- Codonoboea descendens (B.L.Burtt) A.Weber
- Codonoboea doryphylla (B.L.Burtt) C.L.Lim
- Codonoboea elata (Ridl.) Rafidah
- Codonoboea elegans (C.B.Clarke) A.Weber
- Codonoboea ericiflora (Ridl.) Ridl.
- Codonoboea falcata (Kiew) Kiew
- Codonoboea fasciata (Ridl.) C.L.Lim
- Codonoboea filicalyx (B.L.Burtt) D.J.Middleton
- Codonoboea flava (Ridl.) Kiew
- Codonoboea flavescens (Ridl.) Kiew
- Codonoboea flavobrunnea (Ridl.) Kiew
- Codonoboea floribunda (M.R.Hend.) C.L.Lim
- Codonoboea follicularis (C.B.Clarke) A.Weber
- Codonoboea geitleri (A.Weber) C.L.Lim
- Codonoboea glabrata (Ridl.) Kiew
- Codonoboea gracilipes (C.B.Clarke) A.Weber
- Codonoboea grandifolia (Ridl.) Kiew
- Codonoboea heterophylla (Ridl.) C.L.Lim
- Codonoboea hirsuta (Ridl.) C.L.Lim
- Codonoboea hirta (Ridl.) Kiew
- Codonoboea hispida (Ridl.) Kiew
- Codonoboea holttumii (M.R.Hend.) C.L.Lim
- Codonoboea humilis (Miq.) D.J.Middleton & Mich.Möller
- Codonoboea inaequalis (Ridl.) Kiew
- Codonoboea johorica (Ridl.) Kiew
- Codonoboea kelantanensis (Kiew) Kiew
- Codonoboea kenaboiensis Syahida-Emiza, Y.Y.Sam & Siti-Munirah
- Codonoboea kjellbergii (B.L.Burtt) Karton.
- Codonoboea koerperi (B.L.Burtt) A.Weber
- Codonoboea kolokensis (B.L.Burtt) D.J.Middleton
- Codonoboea kompsoboea (C.B.Clarke) A.Weber
- Codonoboea lanceolata (C.B.Clarke) A.Weber
- Codonoboea lancifolia (M.R.Hend.) C.L.Lim
- Codonoboea leiophylla (Kiew) C.L.Lim
- Codonoboea leptocalyx (C.B.Clarke) A.Weber
- Codonoboea leucantha (Kiew) Kiew
- Codonoboea leucocodon (Ridl.) Ridl.
- Codonoboea lilacina (Ridl.) Ridl.
- Codonoboea longipes (C.B.Clarke) Kiew
- Codonoboea malayana (Hook.f.) Kiew
- Codonoboea marginata (C.B.Clarke) C.L.Lim
- Codonoboea mentigiensis Kiew
- Codonoboea miniata (Kiew) C.L.Lim
- Codonoboea murutorum (B.L.Burtt) A.Weber
- Codonoboea myricifolia (Ridl.) A.Weber
- Codonoboea nervosa (C.B.Clarke) A.Weber
- Codonoboea nitida (Kiew & A.Weber) Kiew
- Codonoboea nivea Kiew
- Codonoboea norakhirrudiniana Kiew
- Codonoboea oreophila Kiew ex C.L.Lim
- Codonoboea padangensis Kiew
- Codonoboea pagonensis (B.L.Burtt) A.Weber
- Codonoboea parviflora (Ridl.) Kiew
- Codonoboea pauziana (Kiew) Kiew
- Codonoboea pectinata (C.B.Clarke ex Oliv.) Kiew
- Codonoboea personatiflora Kiew & Y.Y.Sam
- Codonoboea platypus (C.B.Clarke) C.L.Lim
- Codonoboea pleuropogon (B.L.Burtt) A.Weber
- Codonoboea polyanthoides (Kiew) C.L.Lim
- Codonoboea poopathii D.J.Middleton
- Codonoboea porphyrea (B.L.Burtt) D.J.Middleton
- Codonoboea primulina (Ridl.) Kiew
- Codonoboea pulchella (Ridl.) C.L.Lim
- Codonoboea pumila (Ridl.) C.L.Lim
- Codonoboea punctata (C.B.Clarke) A.Weber
- Codonoboea puncticulata (Ridl.) C.L.Lim
- Codonoboea pyroliflora (Ridl.) Kiew
- Codonoboea quinquevulnera (Ridl.) C.L.Lim
- Codonoboea racemosa (Jack) A.Weber
- Codonoboea ramosa (Ridl.) Kiew
- Codonoboea reptans (Jack) C.L.Lim
- Codonoboea reticulosa (C.B.Clarke) A.Weber
- Codonoboea rheophytica Kiew
- Codonoboea robinsonii (Ridl.) Kiew
- Codonoboea rubiginosa (Ridl.) C.L.Lim
- Codonoboea rugosa (Ridl.) C.L.Lim
- Codonoboea ruthiae Syahida-Emiza, Y.Y.Sam & Siti-Munirah
- Codonoboea salicina (Ridl.) C.L.Lim
- Codonoboea salicinoides (Kiew) C.L.Lim
- Codonoboea sallehuddiniana C.L.Lim
- Codonoboea scabrinervia (C.B.Clarke) A.Weber
- Codonoboea serrata (R.Br.) A.Weber
- Codonoboea serratifolia (Ridl.) Kiew
- Codonoboea simplex (Kraenzl.) A.Weber
- Codonoboea soldanella (Ridl.) C.L.Lim
- Codonoboea stolonifera (Kiew) Kiew
- Codonoboea tembatensis Kiew
- Codonoboea teres (C.B.Clarke) A.Weber
- Codonoboea tiumanica (Burkill ex Ridl.) C.L.Lim
- Codonoboea urticoides (A.Weber) Kiew
- Codonoboea venusta (Ridl.) Kiew
- Codonoboea virginea (B.L.Burtt) A.Weber
- Codonoboea viscida (Ridl.) Kiew
- Codonoboea vulcanica (Ridl.) A.Weber
- Codonoboea woodii (Merr.) A.Weber
- Codonoboea yongii (Kiew) C.L.Lim
