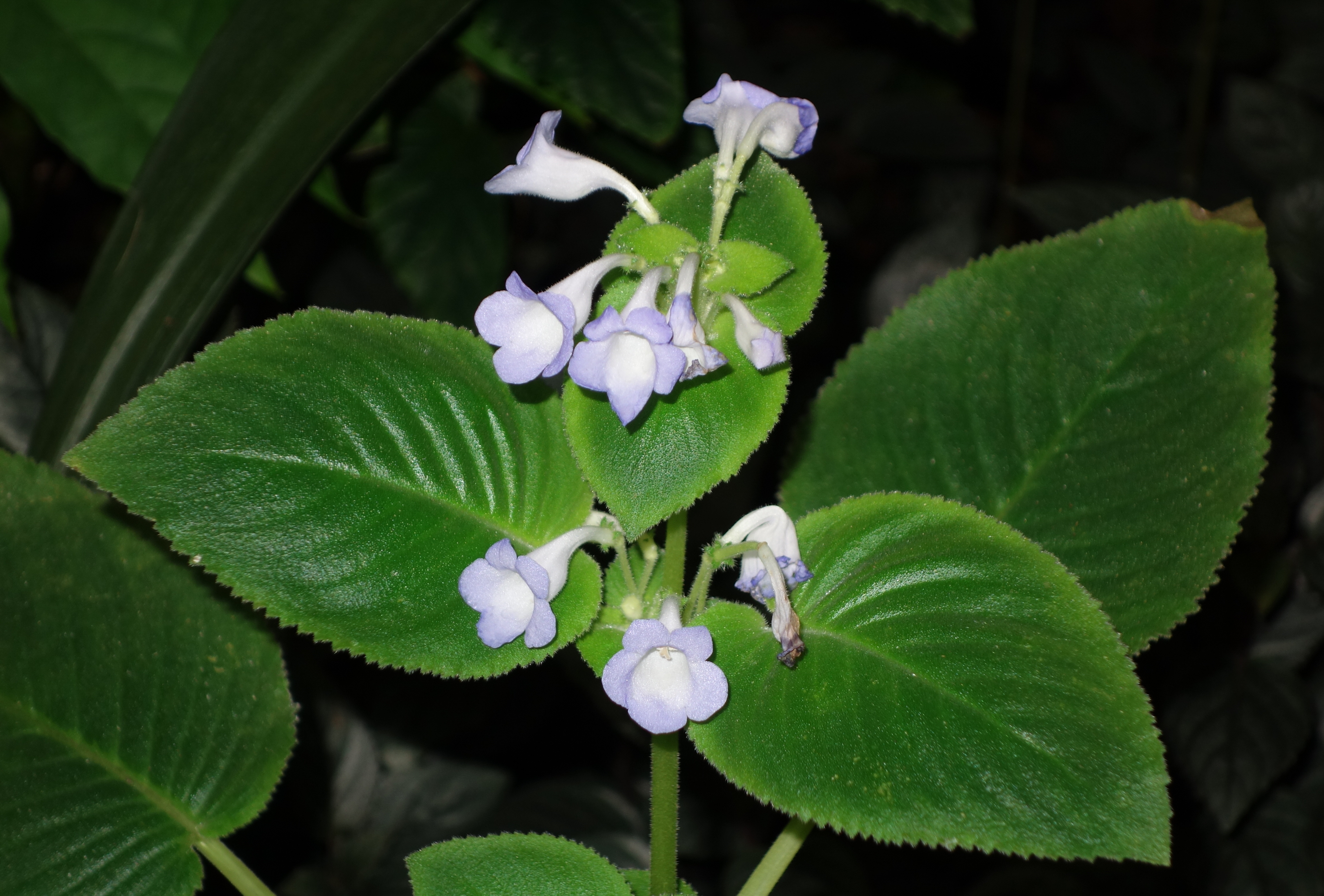
- At the Dresden Botanical Garden
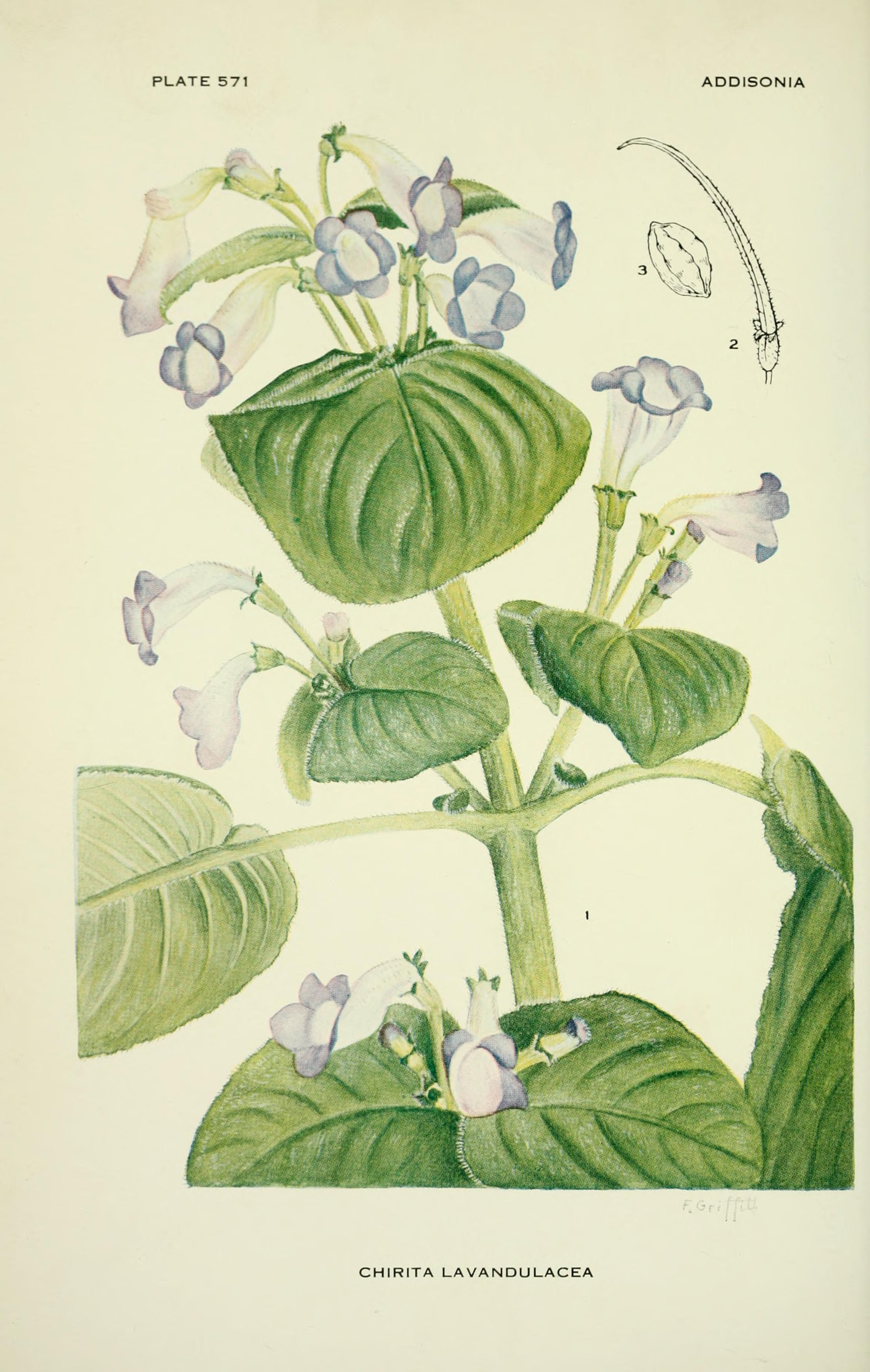
- Botanical illustration

Scientific classification
- Kingdom: Plantae
- Clade: Embryophytes
- Clade: Tracheophytes
- Clade: Spermatophytes
- Clade: Angiosperms
- Clade: Eudicots
- Clade: Asterids
- Order: Lamiales
- Family: Gesneriaceae
- Genus: Microchirita
- Species: M. lavandulacea

Binomial name
- Microchirita lavandulacea (Stapf) Yin Z.Wang

Synonyms
- Chirita lavandulacea Stapf

= Microchirita lavandulacea =

Species of flowering plant

Microchirita lavandulacea, called the lavender microchirita, is a species of flowering plant in the genus Microchirita, native to southern Vietnam. It has gained the Royal Horticultural Society's Award of Garden Merit.
