= Henckelia monophylla =

Scientific classification
- Kingdom: Plantae
- Clade: Embryophytes
- Clade: Tracheophytes
- Clade: Spermatophytes
- Clade: Angiosperms
- Clade: Eudicots
- Clade: Asterids
- Order: Lamiales
- Family: Gesneriaceae
- Genus: Henckelia
- Species: H. monophylla

Binomial name
- Henckelia monophylla (C.B.Clarke) D.J.Middleton & Mich.Möller

Species of flowering plant

Henckelia monophylla is a species of flowering plant in the family Gesneriaceae.

== Description ==
It is native to parts of South and Southeast Asia, where it typically grows in moist, shaded habitats. The species is characterized by its simple, often solitary leaves and delicate tubular flowers. Like other members of the genus Henckelia, it is adapted to rocky or forested environments.
