= Loxocarpus =

- Loxocarpus taeniophyllus

Scientific classification
- Kingdom: Plantae
- Clade: Tracheophytes
- Clade: Angiosperms
- Clade: Eudicots
- Clade: Asterids
- Order: Lamiales
- Family: Gesneriaceae
- Subfamily: Didymocarpoideae
- Genus: Loxocarpus; R.Br. (1840)

Type species
- Loxocarpus incanus R.Br.

Species
- 26; see text

Genus of flowering plants

Loxocarpus is a genus of flowering plants in the family Gesneriaceae. It includes 26 species native to Malesia, ranging from southern Thailand to Peninsular Malaysia, Sumatra, and Borneo. Many of its species were formerly placed in the genus Henckelia.

== Species ==
26 species are accepted.

- Loxocarpus argenteus L.Burtt
- Loxocarpus burttii T.L.Yao
- Loxocarpus caeruleus (Ridl.) Ridl.
- Loxocarpus caulescens B.L.Burtt
- Loxocarpus conicapsularis (C.B.Clarke) B.L.Burtt
- Loxocarpus coodei (B.L.Burtt) T.L.Yao
- Loxocarpus holttumii M.R. Hend.
- Loxocarpus incanus R.Br.
  - L. incanus var. incanus
  - L. incanus var. sekayuensis (Banka & Kiew) T.L.Yao
- Loxocarpus littoralis T.L.Yao
- Loxocarpus longipetiolatus B.L.Burtt
- Loxocarpus meijeri B.L.Burtt
- Loxocarpus minimus Ridl.
- Loxocarpus papillosus M.R.Hend.
- Loxocarpus pauzii T.L.Yao
- Loxocarpus petiolaris (C.B.Clarke) B.L.Burtt
- Loxocarpus repens B.L.Burtt
- Loxocarpus rufescens (C.B. Clarke) B.L.Burtt
- Loxocarpus segelamensis T.L.Yao
- Loxocarpus semitortus (C.B.Clarke) Ridl.
- Loxocarpus sericeus (Ridl.) B.L.Burtt
- Loxocarpus sericiflavus (Banka & Kiew) T.L.Yao
- Loxocarpus stapfii (Kraenzl.) B.L.Burtt
- Loxocarpus taeniophyllus (B.L.Burtt) T.L.Yao
- Loxocarpus tunkui Kiew
- Loxocarpus verbeniflos (C.B.Clarke) B.L.Burtt
- Loxocarpus violoides (C.B.Clarke) T.L.Yao.
