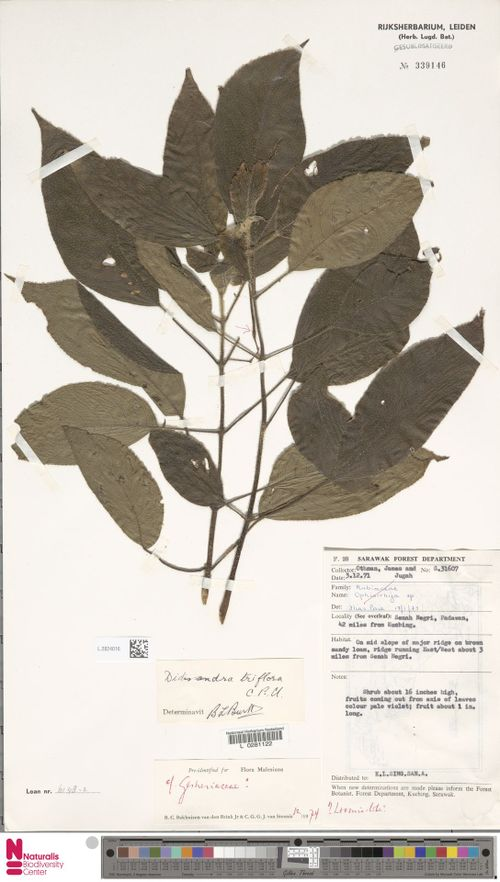

Scientific classification
- Kingdom: Plantae
- Clade: Embryophytes
- Clade: Tracheophytes
- Clade: Spermatophytes
- Clade: Angiosperms
- Clade: Eudicots
- Clade: Asterids
- Order: Lamiales
- Family: Gesneriaceae
- Genus: Didissandra
- Species: D. triflora

Binomial name
- Didissandra triflora C.B.Clarke

Synonyms
- Didymocarpus triflorus (C.B.Clarke) B.L.Burtt

= Didissandra triflora =

Species of flowering plant

Didissandra triflora is a species of flowering plant in the family Gesneriaceae. It is a shrub or subshrub native to Borneo. The species was described in 1883.

== Taxonomy ==
The species was described by Charles Baron Clarke in 1883.

== Distribution ==
Didissandra triflora is native to the wet tropical biome of western Borneo.

== Description ==
Didissandra triflora is a shrub or subshrub. The stalk is 20–30 centimetres (7.9–11.8 in) high.

The leaves are around 17 centimetres (6.7 in) long, and around 4.5 centimetres (1.8 in) wide. The corolla is around 9 millimetres (0.35 in) long. The fruits are capsules, around 4 centimetres (1.6 in) long.
