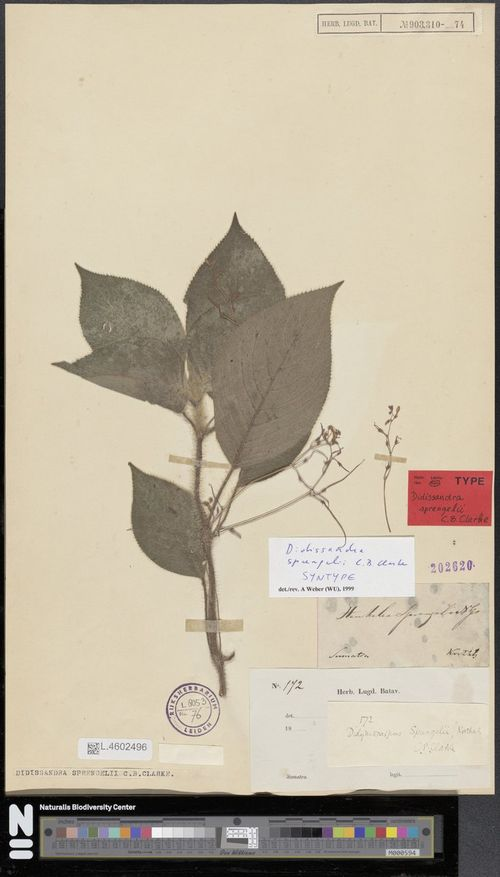

Scientific classification
- Kingdom: Plantae
- Clade: Embryophytes
- Clade: Tracheophytes
- Clade: Spermatophytes
- Clade: Angiosperms
- Clade: Eudicots
- Clade: Asterids
- Order: Lamiales
- Family: Gesneriaceae
- Genus: Didissandra
- Species: D. sprengelii

Binomial name
- Didissandra sprengelii C.B.Clarke

= Didissandra sprengelii =

Species of flowering plant

Didissandra sprengelii is a species of flowering plant in the family Gesneriaceae. It is a subshrub native to the wet tropical biome of western Sumatra. The species was named in 1883, by Charles Baron Clarke.

== Description ==
Didissandra sprengelii is a subshrub. The corolla is a straight tube. The fruits are capsules.
