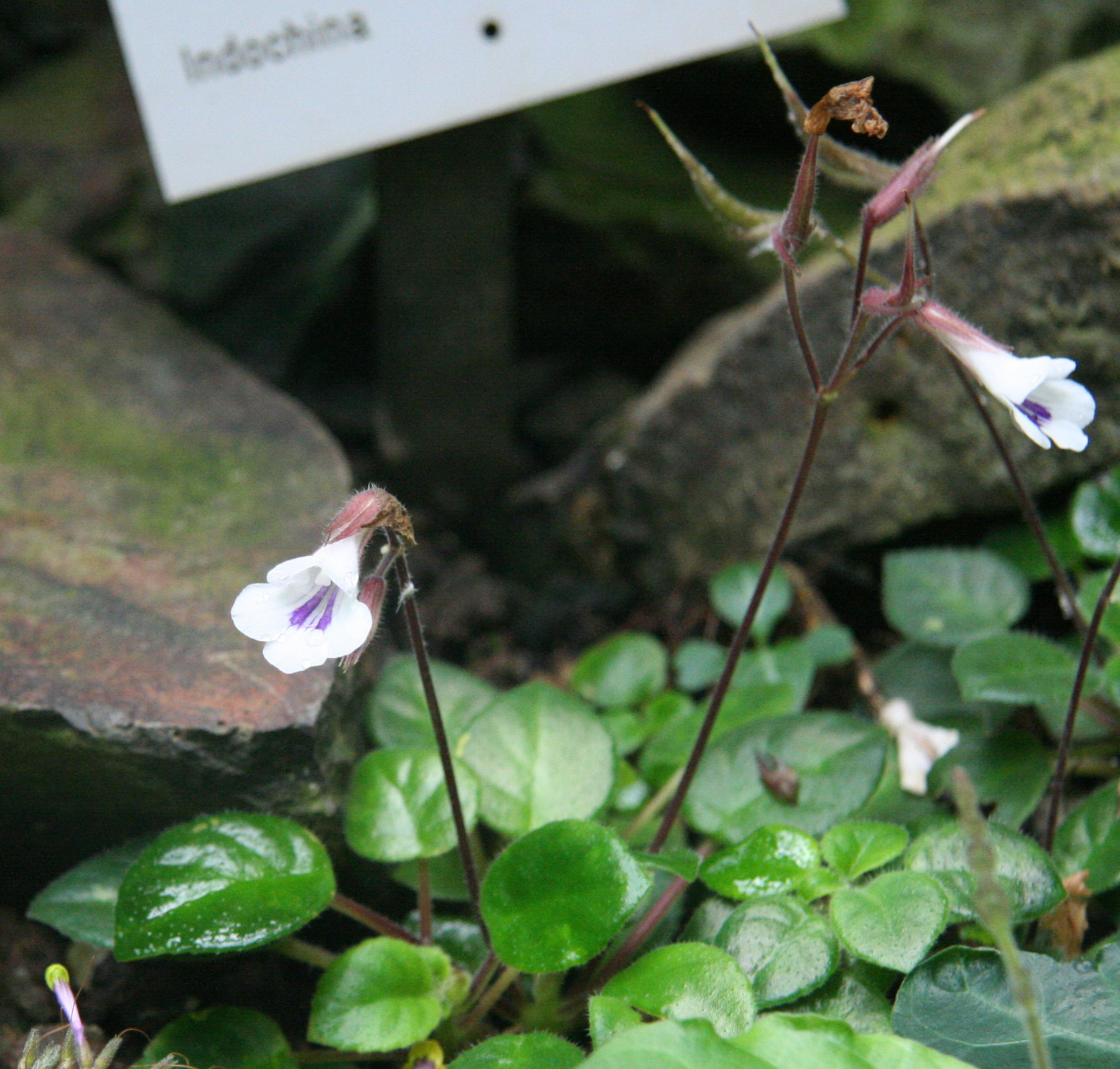
- Metapetrocosmea eberhardtii

Scientific classification
- Kingdom: Plantae
- Clade: Tracheophytes
- Clade: Angiosperms
- Clade: Eudicots
- Clade: Asterids
- Order: Lamiales
- Family: Gesneriaceae
- Genus: Metapetrocosmea
- Species: M. eberhardtii

Binomial name
- Metapetrocosmea eberhardtii (Pellegr.) Yin Z.Wang & P.W.Li (2022)

Synonyms
- Chirita eberhardtii Pellegr. (1926); Deinostigma eberhardtii (Pellegr.) D.J.Middleton & H.J.Atkins (2016); Primulina eberhardtii (Pellegr.) Mich.Möller & A.Weber

= Metapetrocosmea eberhardtii =

Species of flowering plant

Metapetrocosmea eberhardtii is a species of flowering plant in the family Gesneriaceae. It is a perennial native to central Vietnam.

It was first described as Chirita eberhardtii in 1926 by François Pellegrin, and was moved to the genus Deinostigma in 2016 by Möller and others. In 2022 Yin Z. Wang and Peng-Wei Li moved it to genus Metapetrocosmea.
