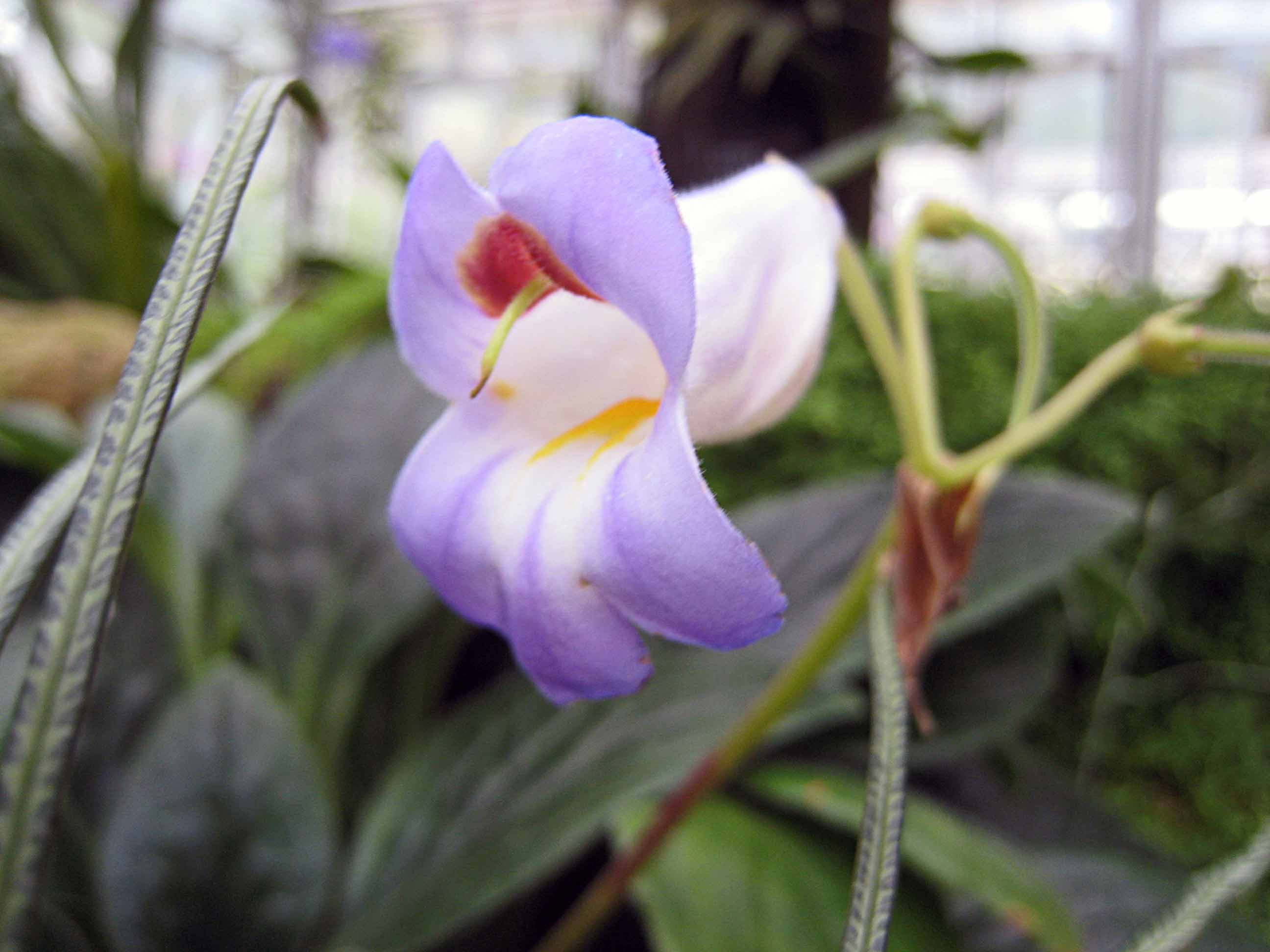
- In bloom in Hong Kong
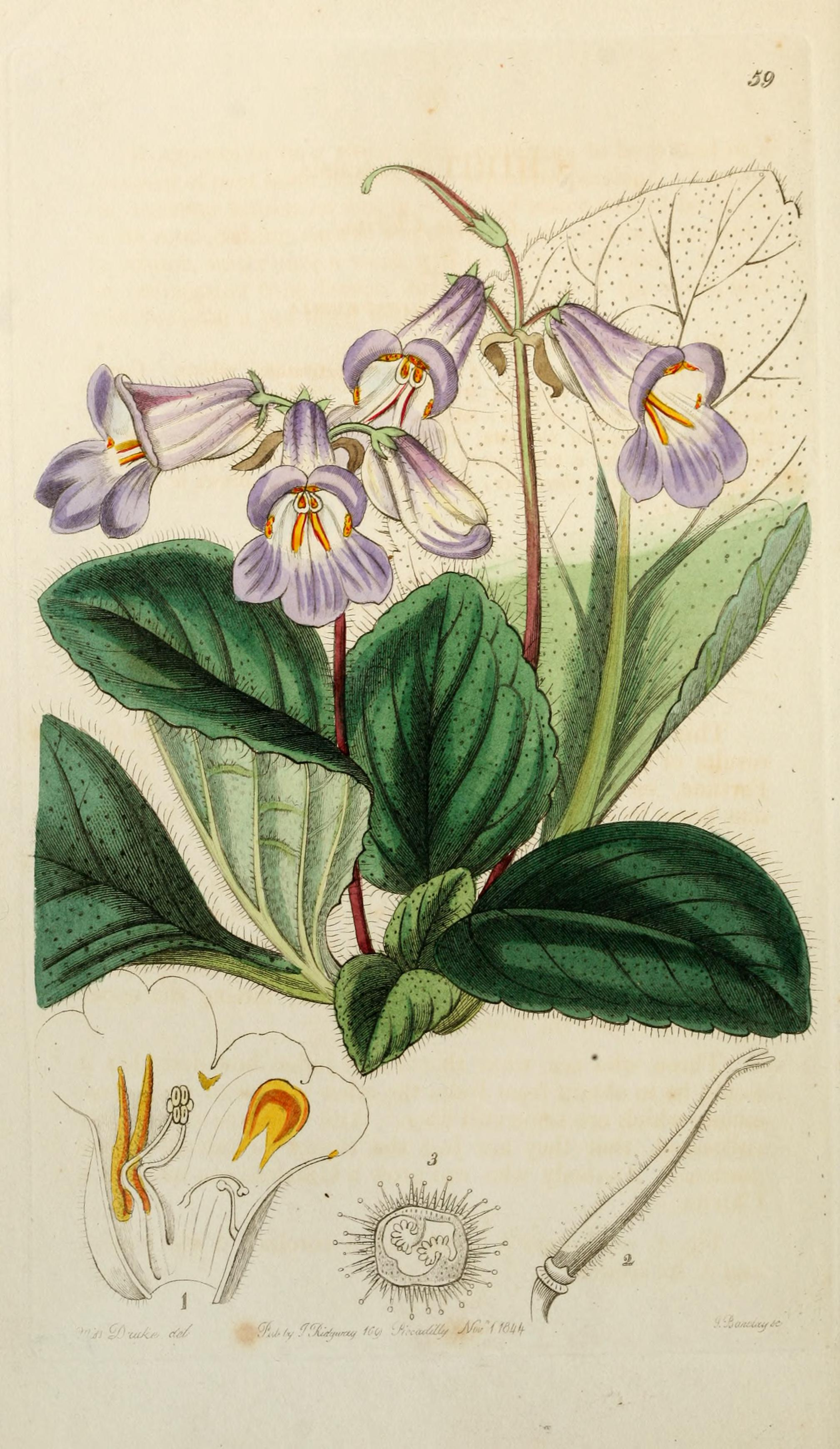
- Botanical illustration

Scientific classification
- Kingdom: Plantae
- Clade: Embryophytes
- Clade: Tracheophytes
- Clade: Spermatophytes
- Clade: Angiosperms
- Clade: Eudicots
- Clade: Asterids
- Order: Lamiales
- Family: Gesneriaceae
- Genus: Primulina
- Species: P. dryas

Binomial name
- Primulina dryas (Dunn) Mich.Möller & A.Weber

Synonyms
- List: Chirita dryas Dunn; Chirita sinensis Lindl.; Didymocarpus sinensis (Lindl.) H.Lév.; Primulina sinensis (Lindl.) Yin Z.Wang; Roettlera sinensis (Lindl.) Kuntze

= Primulina dryas =

Species of flowering plant

Primulina dryas, called the oak-nymph-leaved primulina, is a species of flowering plant in the genus Primulina, native to southeast China. It has gained the Royal Horticultural Society's Award of Garden Merit.
