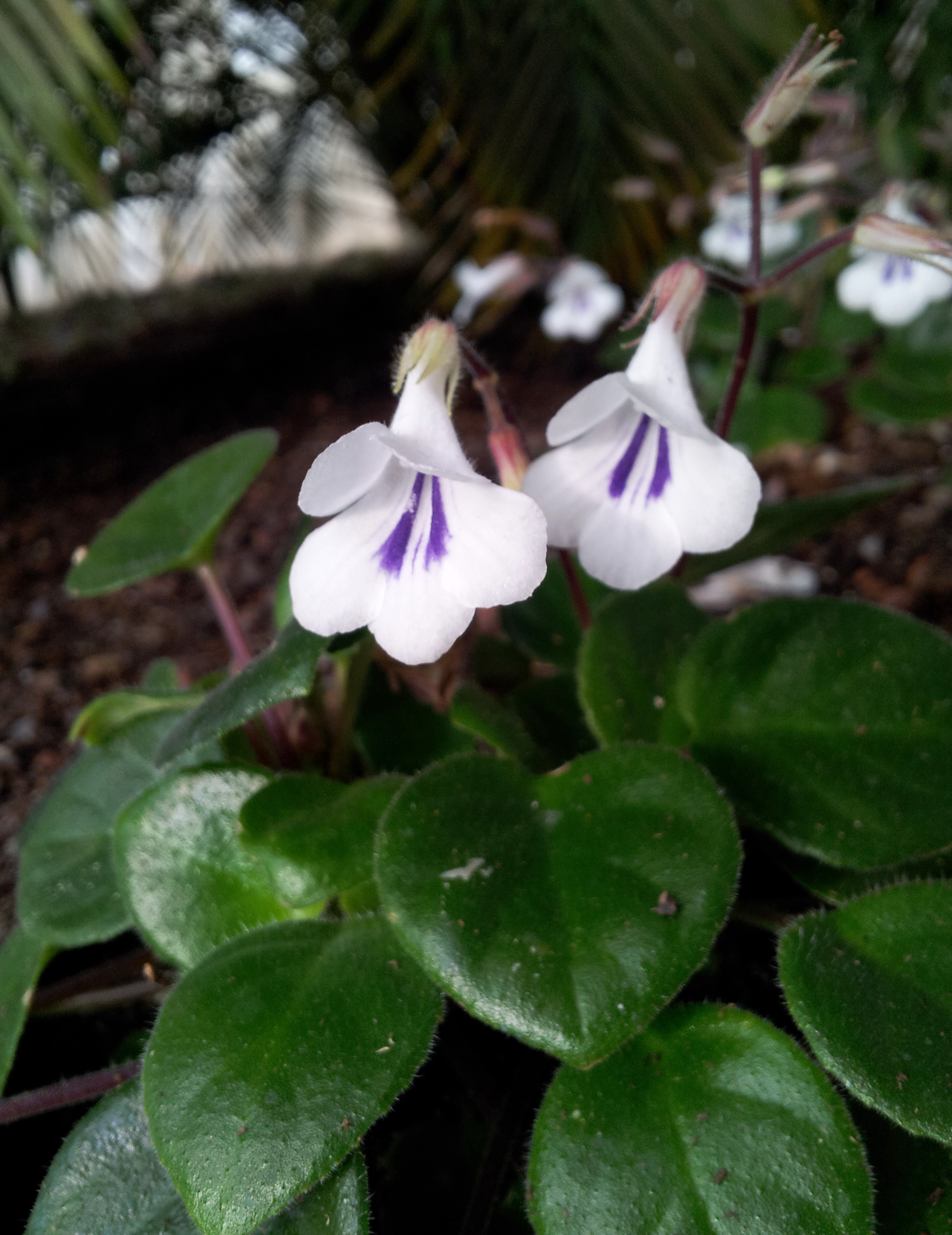
- Metapetrocosmea tamiana

Scientific classification
- Kingdom: Plantae
- Clade: Tracheophytes
- Clade: Angiosperms
- Clade: Eudicots
- Clade: Asterids
- Order: Lamiales
- Family: Gesneriaceae
- Subfamily: Didymocarpoideae
- Genus: Metapetrocosmea; W.T.Wang (1981)

Species
- 10; see text

Synonyms
- Deinostigma W.T.Wang & Z.Y.Li (1992)

= Metapetrocosmea =

Genus of plants

Metapetrocosmea is a genus of flowering plants belonging to the family Gesneriaceae. It includes ten species native to southern China, Hainan, and Vietnam.

A 2022 phylogenetic and morphological study by Peng-Wei Li et al. concluded that genus Deinostigma should be included in Metapetrocosmea. In 2016 Deinostigma had been expanded with the transfer of several species that had previously been place in the genus Primulina.

== Species ==
Ten species are accepted.

- Metapetrocosmea alba X.R.Zheng, P.S.Zou & S.P.Dai
- Metapetrocosmea cicatricosa (W.T.Wang) Yin Z.Wang & P.W.Li
- Metapetrocosmea cycnostyla (B.L.Burtt) Yin Z.Wang & P.W.Li
- Metapetrocosmea cyrtocarpa (D.Fang & L.Zeng) Yin Z.Wang & P.W.Li
- Metapetrocosmea eberhardtii (Pellegr.) Yin Z.Wang & P.W.Li
- Metapetrocosmea fasciculata (W.H.Chen & Y.M.Shui) Yin Z.Wang & P.W.Li
- Metapetrocosmea minutihamata (D.Wood) Yin Z.Wang & P.W.Li
- Metapetrocosmea peltata (Merr. & Chun) W.T.Wang
- Metapetrocosmea poilanei (Pellegr.) Yin Z.Wang & P.W.Li
- Metapetrocosmea tamiana (B.L.Burtt) Yin Z.Wang & P.W.Li
