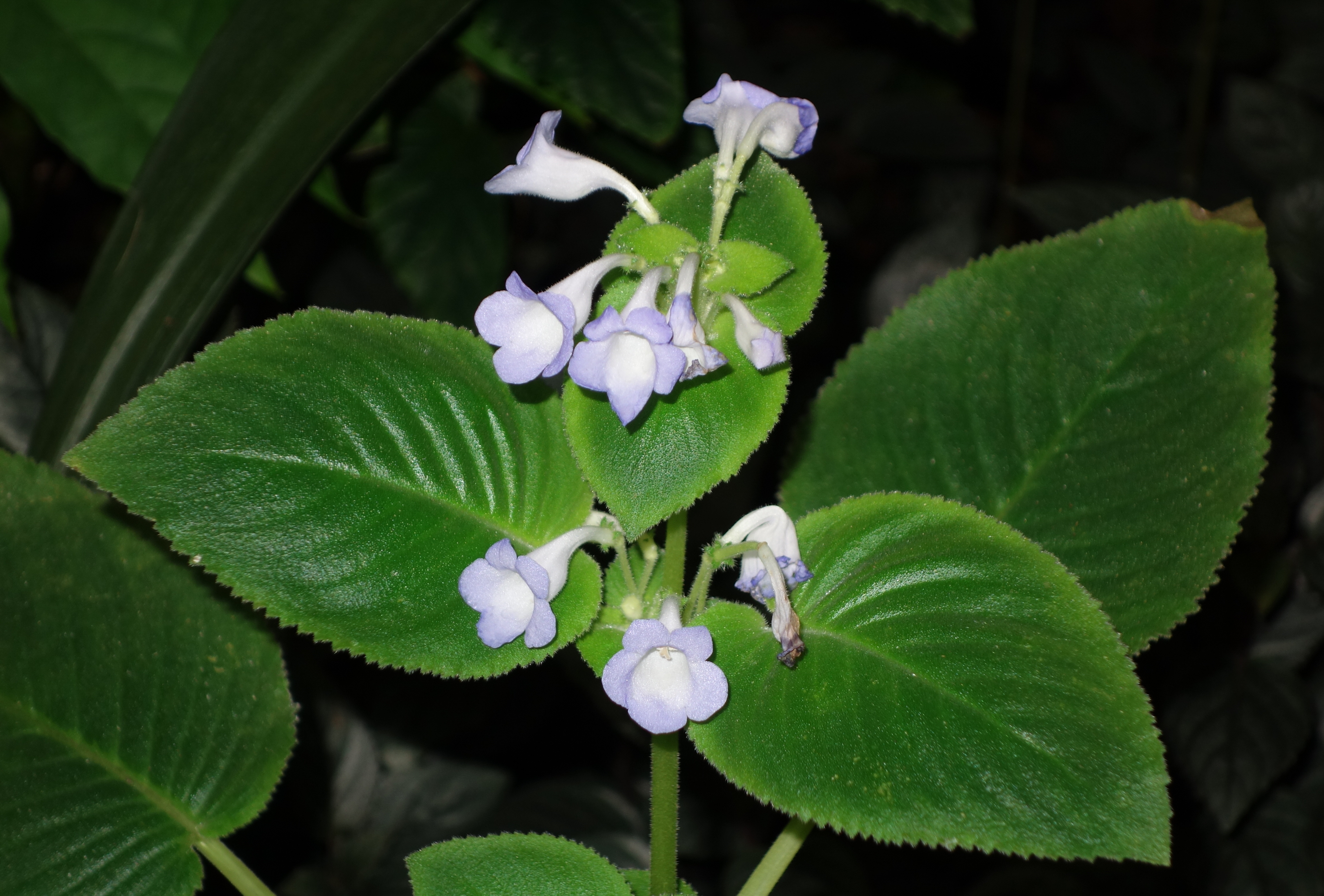
- Microchirita lavandulacea

Scientific classification
- Kingdom: Plantae
- Clade: Tracheophytes
- Clade: Angiosperms
- Clade: Eudicots
- Clade: Asterids
- Order: Lamiales
- Family: Gesneriaceae
- Subfamily: Didymocarpoideae
- Genus: Microchirita (C.B.Clarke) Yin Z.Wang (2011)

Species
- 48; see text

= Microchirita =

Genus of flowering plants

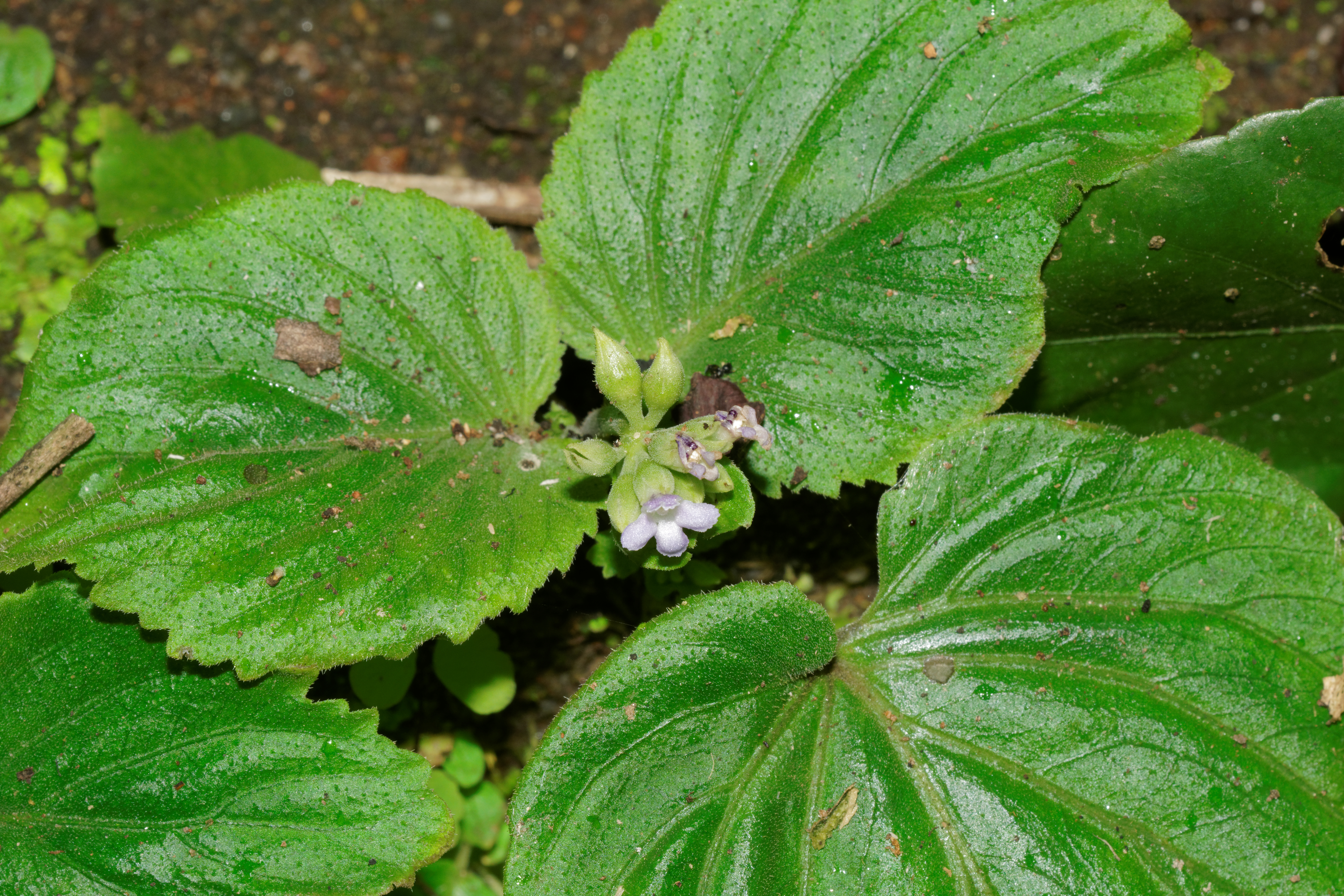
Microchirita hamosa in Silent Valley

Microchirita is a genus of flowering plants in the family Gesneriaceae, subfamily Didymocarpoideae. It contains 48 species native to tropical Asia, ranging from the Indian subcontinent to Indochina, southern China, and Malesia.

== Species ==
48 species are accepted.

- Microchirita albiflora D.J.Middleton & Triboun
- Microchirita albocyanea C.Puglisi
- Microchirita aratriformis (D.Wood) A.Weber & D.J.Middleton
- Microchirita barbata (Sprague) A.Weber & D.J.Middleton
- Microchirita bimaculata (D.Wood) A.Weber & D.J.Middleton
- Microchirita caerulea (R.Br.) Yin Z.Wang
- Microchirita caliginosa (C.B.Clarke) Yin Z.Wang
- Microchirita candida C.Puglisi & D.J.Middleton
- Microchirita chonburiensis D.J.Middleton & C.Puglisi
- Microchirita cristata (Dalzell) D.J.Middleton
- Microchirita elphinstonia (Craib) A.Weber & D.J.Middleton
- Microchirita formosa D.J.Middleton
- Microchirita fuscifaucia C.Puglisi & D.J.Middleton
- Microchirita glandulosa C.Puglisi
- Microchirita hairulii Rafidah
- Microchirita hamosa (R.Br.) Yin Z.Wang
- Microchirita hemratii C.Puglisi
- Microchirita huppatatensis C.Puglisi
- Microchirita hypocrateriformis C.Puglisi
- Microchirita involucrata (Craib) Yin Z.Wang
- Microchirita karaketii D.J.Middleton & Triboun
- Microchirita lavandulacea (Stapf) Yin Z.Wang
- Microchirita lilacina C.Puglisi
- Microchirita limbata C.Puglisi
- Microchirita luteola C.Puglisi
- Microchirita marcanii (Craib) A.Weber & D.J.Middleton
- Microchirita micromusa (B.L.Burtt) A.Weber & D.J.Middleton
- Microchirita minor Z.B.Xin, T.V.Do & F.Wen
- Microchirita mollissima (Ridl.) A.Weber & D.J.Middleton
- Microchirita oculata (Craib) A.Weber & D.J.Middleton
- Microchirita personata C.Puglisi
- Microchirita poomae D.J.Middleton
- Microchirita prostrata J.M.Li & Z.Xia
- Microchirita purpurea D.J.Middleton & Triboun
- Microchirita rayongensis C.Puglisi & D.J.Middleton
- Microchirita rupestris (Ridl.) A.Weber & D.J.Middleton
- Microchirita ruthiae Rafidah
- Microchirita sahyadriensis (Punekar & Lakshmin.) A.Weber & D.J.Middleton
- Microchirita sericea (Ridl.) A.Weber & Rafidah
- Microchirita striata D.J.Middleton & C.Puglisi
- Microchirita suddeei D.J.Middleton & Triboun
- Microchirita suwatii D.J.Middleton & C.Puglisi
- Microchirita tadphoensis C.Puglisi
- Microchirita tetsanae C.Puglisi
- Microchirita thailandica C.Puglisi
- Microchirita tubulosa (Craib) A.Weber & D.J.Middleton
- Microchirita viola (Ridl.) A.Weber & Rafidah
- Microchirita woodii D.J.Middleton & Triboun
