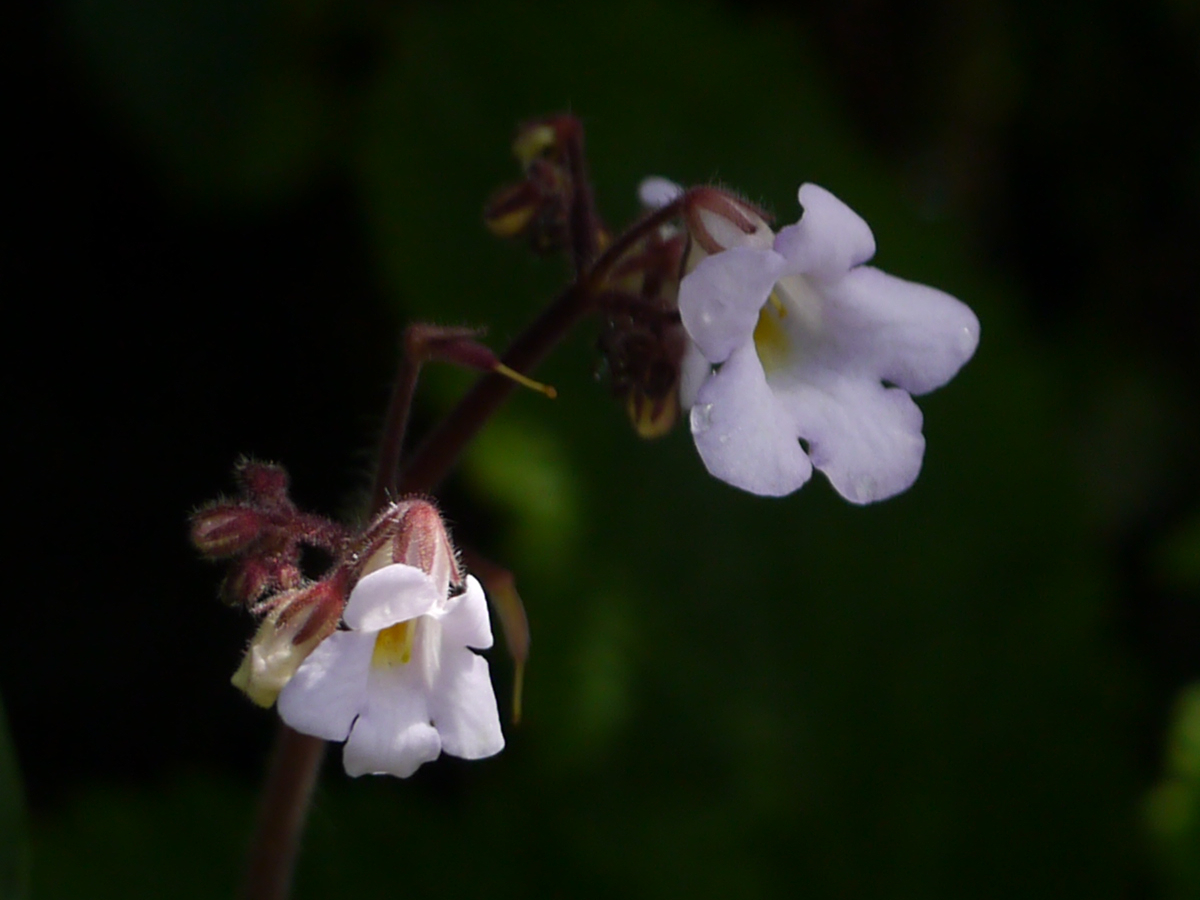
- Henckelia meeboldii

Scientific classification
- Kingdom: Plantae
- Clade: Tracheophytes
- Clade: Angiosperms
- Clade: Eudicots
- Clade: Asterids
- Order: Lamiales
- Family: Gesneriaceae
- Subfamily: Didymocarpoideae
- Genus: Henckelia; Spreng. (1817)

Species
- 82; see text

Synonyms
- Babactes DC. (1840); Calosacme Wall. (1829), nom. nud.; Ceratoscyphus Chun (1946); Chirita Buch.-Ham. ex D.Don (1825); Gonatostemon Regel (1866); Hemiboeopsis W.T.Wang (1984)

= Henckelia =

Genus of flowering plants

Henckelia is a genus of flowering plants in the family Gesneriaceae. Many of its species were formerly placed in Didymocarpus sect. Orthoboea and in the genus Chirita. Many species formerly placed in Henckelia have been moved to Codonoboea and Loxocarpus.

== Species ==
82 species are accepted.

- Henckelia adenocalyx (Chatterjee) D.J.Middleton & Mich.Möller
- Henckelia amplexifolia Sirim.
- Henckelia anachoreta (Hance) D.J.Middleton & Mich.Möller
- Henckelia angusta (C.B.Clarke) D.J.Middleton & Mich.Möller
- Henckelia anthonysamyi Banka
- Henckelia auriculata (J.M.Li & S.X.Zhu) D.J.Middleton & Mich.Möller
- Henckelia bifolia (D.Don) A.Dietr.
- Henckelia briggsioides (W.T.Wang) D.J.Middleton & Mich.Möller
- Henckelia burttii D.J.Middleton & Mich.Möller
- Henckelia calva (C.B.Clarke) D.J.Middleton & Mich.Möller
- Henckelia campanuliflora Sirim.
- Henckelia candida Sirim.
- Henckelia ceratoscyphus (B.L.Burtt) D.J.Middleton & Mich.Möller
- Henckelia collegii-sancti-thomasii A.Joe, D.Borah, Taram & Sandhya
- Henckelia communis (Gardner) D.J.Middleton & Mich.Möller
- Henckelia connata X.Z.Shi & Li H.Yang
- Henckelia dasycalyx Sirim. & D.J.Middleton
- Henckelia dibangensis (B.L.Burtt, S.K.Srivast. & Mehrotra) D.J.Middleton & Mich.Möller
- Henckelia dielsii (Borza) D.J.Middleton & Mich.Möller
- Henckelia diffusa B.L.Burtt
- Henckelia dimidiata (Wall. ex C.B.Clarke) D.J.Middleton & Mich.Möller
- Henckelia fasciculiflora (W.T.Wang) D.J.Middleton & Mich.Möller
- Henckelia fischeri (Gamble) A.Weber & B.L.Burtt
- Henckelia floccosa (Thwaites) A.Weber & B.L.Burtt
- Henckelia forrestii (J.Anthony) D.J.Middleton & Mich.Möller
- Henckelia fruticola (H.W.Li) D.J.Middleton & Mich.Möller
- Henckelia gambleana (C.E.C.Fisch.) A.Weber & B.L.Burtt
- Henckelia grandifolia A.Dietr.
- Henckelia heterostigma (B.L.Burtt) D.J.Middleton & Mich.Möller
- Henckelia hookeri (C.B.Clarke) D.J.Middleton & Mich.Möller
- Henckelia humboldtiana (Gardner) A.Weber & B.L.Burtt
- Henckelia inaequalifolia Li H.Yang & X.Z.Shi
- Henckelia incana (Vahl) Spreng.
- Henckelia infundibuliformis (W.T.Wang) D.J.Middleton & Mich.Möller
- Henckelia innominata (B.L.Burtt) A.Weber & B.L.Burtt
- Henckelia insignis (C.B.Clarke) D.J.Middleton & Mich.Möller
- Henckelia khasiana Nampy & M.K.Akhil
- Henckelia lacei (W.W.Sm.) D.J.Middleton & Mich.Möller
- Henckelia lachenensis (C.B.Clarke) D.J.Middleton & Mich.Möller
- Henckelia lallanii Taram, D.Borah, Tag & R.Kr.Singh
- Henckelia longipedicellata (B.L.Burtt) D.J.Middleton & Mich.Möller
- Henckelia longisepala (H.W.Li) D.J.Middleton & Mich.Möller
- Henckelia lyrata (Wight) A.Weber & B.L.Burtt
- Henckelia macrostachya (E.Barnes) A.Weber & B.L.Burtt
- Henckelia medogensis W.G.Wang, J.Y.Shen & F.Wen
- Henckelia meeboldii (W.W.Sm. & Ramaswami) A.Weber & B.L.Burtt
- Henckelia mishmiensis (Debb. ex Biswas) D.J.Middleton & Mich.Möller
- Henckelia missionis (Wall. ex R.Br.) A.Weber & B.L.Burtt
- Henckelia monantha (W.T.Wang) D.J.Middleton & Mich.Möller
- Henckelia monophylla (C.B.Clarke) D.J.Middleton & Mich.Möller
- Henckelia moonii (Gardner) D.J.Middleton & Mich.Möller
- Henckelia multinervia Lei Cai & Z.L.Dao
- Henckelia nakianensis Sirim., J.Parn. & Hodk.
- Henckelia nanxiheensis Lei Cai & Z.L.Dao
- Henckelia oblongifolia (Roxb.) D.J.Middleton & Mich.Möller
- Henckelia ovalifolia (Wight) A.Weber & B.L.Burtt
- Henckelia pathakii G.Krishna & Lakshmin.
- Henckelia peduncularis (B.L.Burtt) D.J.Middleton & Mich.Möller
- Henckelia pradeepiana Nampy, Manudev & A.Weber
- Henckelia primulacea (C.B.Clarke) D.J.Middleton & Mich.Möller
- Henckelia puerensis (Y.Y.Qian) D.J.Middleton & Mich.Möller
- Henckelia pumila (D.Don) A.Dietr.
- Henckelia pycnantha (W.T.Wang) D.J.Middleton & Mich.Möller
- Henckelia repens (Bedd.) A.Weber & B.L.Burtt
- Henckelia rotundata (Barnett) D.J.Middleton & Mich.Möller
- Henckelia scortechinii (Ridl.) A.Weber
- Henckelia shuii (Z.Yu Li) D.J.Middleton & Mich.Möller
- Henckelia siangensis Taram, D.Borah & Tag
- Henckelia speciosa (Kurz) D.J.Middleton & Mich.Möller
- Henckelia stenophylla A.Weber
- Henckelia tibetica (Franch.) D.J.Middleton & Mich.Möller
- Henckelia umbellata Kanthraj & K.Narayanan
- Henckelia urticifolia (Buch.-Ham. ex D.Don) A.Dietr
- Henckelia viridiflora J.Mathew & P.M.Salim
- Henckelia walkerae (Gardner) D.J.Middleton & Mich.Möller
- Henckelia wayanadensis Janeesha & Nampy
- Henckelia wightii (C.B.Clarke) A.Weber & B.L.Burtt
- Henckelia wijesundarae Ranasinghe et al.
- Henckelia xinpingensis Y.H.Tan & Bin Yang
- Henckelia zeylanica (R.Br.) A.Weber & B.L.Burtt
