= Chirita =

Obsolete genus of flowering plants

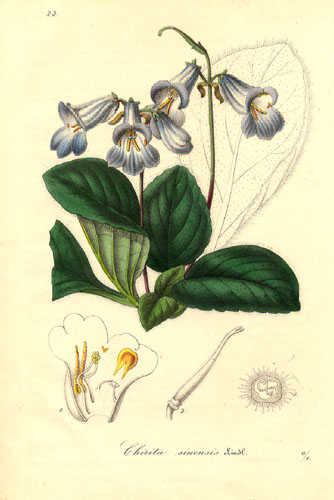
Primulina dryas, formerly Chirita dryas

Chirita was a formerly recognised genus of plants in the family Gesneriaceae, native to the Indo-Malayan realm of South and Southeast Asia and southern China. In 2011, the species in the genus were reassigned to several genera, so that Chirita became a synonym, no longer recognized. The type species C. urticifolia was assigned to the genus Henckelia as H. urticifolia (Buch.-Ham. ex D. Don.) A. Dietr.

About (80-)150 species were recognized, about 100 of which are endemic to China. Most of the species have showy tubular flowers with five, usually rounded, petal lobes and are becoming increasingly popular as houseplants in temperate regions, much like their cousins the African violets.

Chirita comes from a Nepalese common name for a gentian.

== Taxonomic changes ==
The genus Chirita is no longer recognized, with many species transferred to the genera Primulina, Microchirita, and Deinostigma, and several more (including the type species) to Henckelia. However, the former genus name is still sometimes used in horticultural literature, especially for the most commonly cultivated species, Chirita sinensis (now Primulina dryas).

== General cultivation ==
Most can be grown in pots in warm (though some are known to tolerate colder conditions), humid conditions and can be propagated from seed (sown in the late winter) or by taking cuttings in the spring and summer.

Chirita sinensis (now Primulina dryas) and Chirita lavandulacea (now Microchirita lavandulacea) have gained the Royal Horticultural Society's Award of Garden Merit (confirmed 2017).
