= Anton Weber =

German art director

- Born: 30 April 1904; Bollschweil, Baden-Württemberg, German Empire
- Died: 4 June 1979 (aged 75); Fréland, Haut-Rhin, France
- Occupation: Art director
- Years active: 1935-1950 (film)

Anton Weber (1904 – 1979) was a German art director. He designed the film sets for a number of productions during the Nazi era, including Ball at the Metropol (1937) and Germanin (1943).

== Selected filmography ==
- Ball at the Metropol (1937)
- Rubber (1938)
- Adrienne Lecouvreur (1938)
- Coral Reefs (1939)
- The Girl at the Reception (1940)
- Stukas (1941)
- Germanin (1943)
- Young Hearts (1944)
- A Cheerful House (1944)
- After the Rain Comes Sunshine (1949)

== Bibliography ==
- Giesen, Rolf. Nazi Propaganda Films: A History and Filmography. McFarland & Company, 2003.
- Nicolella, Henry. Frank Wisbar: The Director of Ferryman Maria, from Germany to America and Back. McFarland, 2018.
