= B. L. Burtt =

English botanist and taxonomist

Bill Burtt with Streptocarpus grandis leaf in the Nkandla Forest, South Africa

Brian Laurence "Bill" Burtt FRSE FLS (27 August 1913 – 30 May 2008), was an English botanist and taxonomist who is noted for his contributions to the family Gesneriaceae. In a career that spanned 74 years, he worked first at the Royal Botanic Gardens, Kew, and then at the Royal Botanic Garden Edinburgh (RBGE). He made numerous field trips to South Africa and Sarawak and described a total of 637 new plant species. Burtt is denoted by the author abbreviation B.L.Burtt when citing a botanical name.

== Education and career ==
Brian Laurence Burtt, known to colleagues as Bill, was born 27 August 1913 in Claygate, Surrey, to Mabel Johnston and Laurence Buckley Burtt. He was educated at Dulwich College, excelling in Latin. After Dulwich he was employed at Kew as herbarium assistant to Arthur William Hill, the Director. Here he learnt to work with dried plant material from all over the world, painstakingly dissecting and classifying. Burtt wrote his first paper in 1932 with the assistance of John Hutchinson, the authority on South African plants. This was the first of 384 papers, the final being published in 2006.

Another of his papers appeared in 1935 and was co-authored by the Director, Arthur William Hill, dealing with two genera from New Zealand, Tasmania and Australia, Gaultheria and Pernettya. He took night classes in botany at Chelsea Polytechnic, and was awarded an external Bachelor of Science in Biology from the University of London in 1936.

No work had been done at RBGE on Zingiberaceae until the 1960s when Burtt and Paddy Woods went on a collecting trip to Sarawak. By the 1980s RBGE led the world in their extensive living collection of Zingiberaceae from Malaysia and Borneo, only being rivalled in recent years by that of the Smithsonian Institution.

In 1962 Burtt left Edinburgh on the first of five strenuous collecting trips to Sarawak. He made the first of 19 visits to South Africa in 1964, to collect and study Streptocarpus. Here he made the acquaintance of fellow botanist Olive Hilliard of Natal University, and started a collaboration which would last some 44 years.

Their botanical collaboration was extraordinarily prolific, resulting in numerous papers and three books, Streptocarpus: an African Plant Study (1971), The Botany of the Southern Natal Drakensberg (1987), and Dierama: The Hairbells of Africa (1991). They revised the taxonomy of the twinspur, Diascia, a South African member of the Scrophulariaceae. The diascias with which they returned to Scotland were noticed by the nurseryman Hector Harrison, who raised cultivars from this original stock and turned the plant in the space of ten years into one of the most popular subjects for gardeners throughout Britain.

Through Burtt's work, Edinburgh became an important research centre for Gesneriaceae, and led to the popularity in Britain of African violet and Streptocarpus as window-sill plants. Another favoured family were the Zingiberaceae, among which are ginger, turmeric, cardamom and some species of medicinal interest.

=== Honours and awards ===
In 2003 the Edinburgh Journal of Botany published a festschrift for his 90th birthday, including numerous contributions from friends and colleagues scattered throughout the world. An attractive tree-dwelling Aeschynanthus from Sulawesi, Aeschynanthus burttii Mendum was named in his honour.

Burtt was a fellow of the Royal Society of Edinburgh and the Linnean Society of London, and a holder of the Veitch Memorial Medal of the Royal Horticultural Society, the Linnean Society of London's Medal for Botany and the Gesneriad Society’s Award of Appreciation.

=== Personal ===
Burtt was married to Joyce Daughtry in 1942 with whom he had two sons. They separated in the 1960s, and after a long relationship with Olive Hilliard, Burtt married her in 2006. He died 30 May 2008 at Loanhead, Midlothian, Scotland.

== See also ==
- Category:Taxa named by Brian Laurence Burtt
