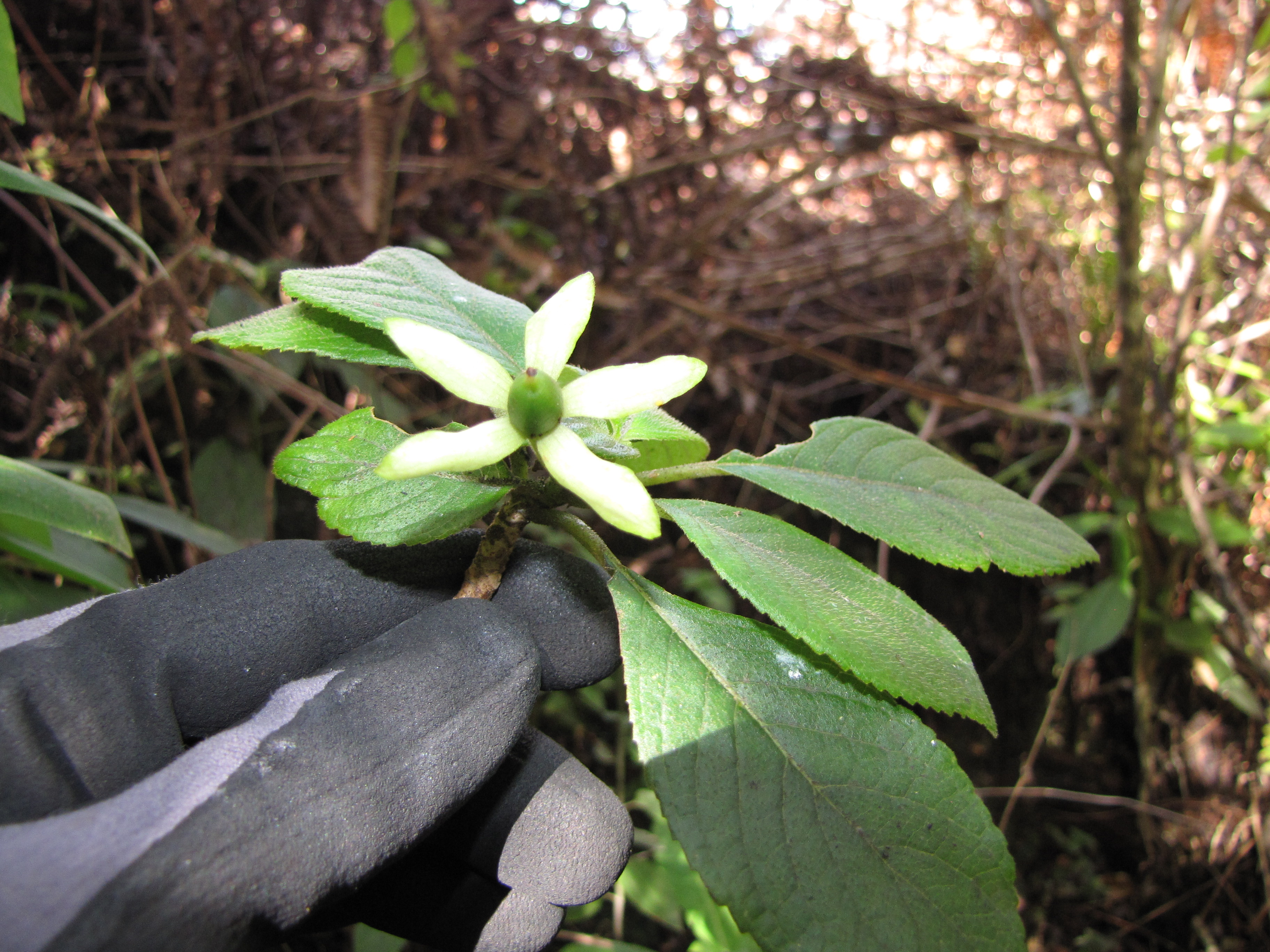
- Cyrtandra grayi

Scientific classification
- Kingdom: Plantae
- Clade: Embryophytes
- Clade: Tracheophytes
- Clade: Angiosperms
- Clade: Eudicots
- Clade: Asterids
- Clade: Lamiids
- Order: Lamiales
- Family: Gesneriaceae
- Subfamily: Didymocarpoideae; Arn.

= Didymocarpoideae =

Subfamily of flowering plants

The Didymocarpoideae are a subfamily of plants in the family Gesneriaceae. It was formerly the subfamily Cyrtandroideae. This subfamily consists mostly of tropical and subtropical Old World genera, found in Africa, Asia and the Pacific. One species (Rhynchoglossum azureum) is native to Central and South America.

== Description ==
Didymocarpoideae is one of two main subfamilies in the Gesneriaceae, the other being Gesnerioideae. (The third subfamily, Sanangoideae, contains only the genus Sanango.) Didymocarpoideae seedlings usually have cotyledons which become different in size and shape (anisocotylous). One cotyledon ceases to grow at some point and then withers away. The other continues to grow, and in extreme cases may grow to become very large and be the only leaf on the plant (Monophyllaea, some Streptocarpus). Didymocarpoideae flowers usually have two fertile stamens, less often four and rarely one or five. The ovary is always superior. The fruit is usually a dry capsule, although other kinds of fruit, such as a fleshy berry, are also found.

== Tribes and genera ==
A classification published in 2020 divides the subfamily into two tribes.

- Tribe Epithemateae
- Epithema
- Gyrogyne
- Loxonia
- Monophyllaea
- Rhynchoglossum
- Stauranthera
- Whytockia
- Tribe Trichosporeae
- Aeschynanthus
- Agalmyla
- Allocheilos
- Allostigma
- Anna
- Beccarinda
- Billolivia
- Boea
- Boeica
- Bournea
- Briggsiopsis
- Cathayanthe
- Championia
- Chayamaritia
- Codonoboea
- Conandron
- Corallodiscus
- Cyrtandra
- Damrongia
- Deinostigma
- Didissandra
- Didymocarpus
- Didymostigma
- Dorcoceras
- Emarhendia
- Glabrella
- Gyrocheilos
- Haberlea
- Hemiboea
- Henckelia
- Hexatheca
- Jerdonia
- Kaisupeea
- Langbiangia
- Leptoboea
- Liebigia
- Litostigma
- Loxocarpus
- Loxostigma
- Lysionotus
- Metapetrocosmea
- Michaelmoelleria
- Microchirita
- Middletonia
- Orchadocarpa
- Oreocharis
- Ornithoboea
- Paraboea
- Petrocodon
- Petrocosmea
- Platystemma
- Primulina
- Pseudochirita
- Rachunia
- Ramonda, including Jankaea
- Raphiocarpus
- Rhabdothamnopsis
- Rhynchotechum
- Ridleyandra
- Senyumia
- Sepikea
- Somrania
- Spelaeanthus
- Streptocarpus, including Saintpaulia
- Tetraphyllum (syn. Tetraphylloides)
- Tribounia
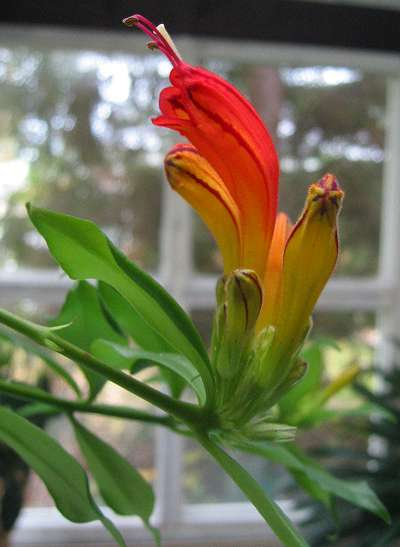
Aeschynanthus speciosus

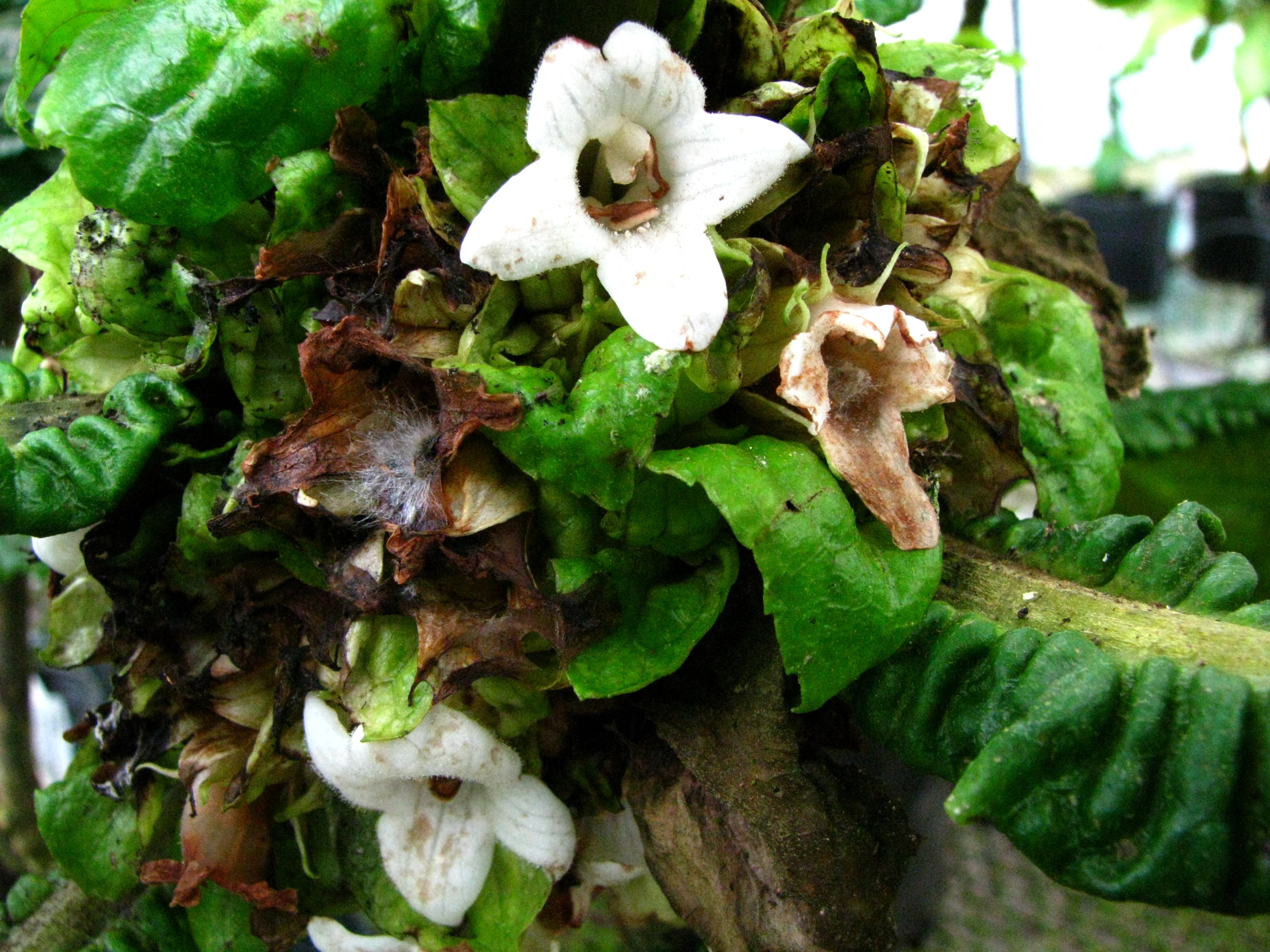
Cyrtandra cyaneoides

Damrongia orientalis

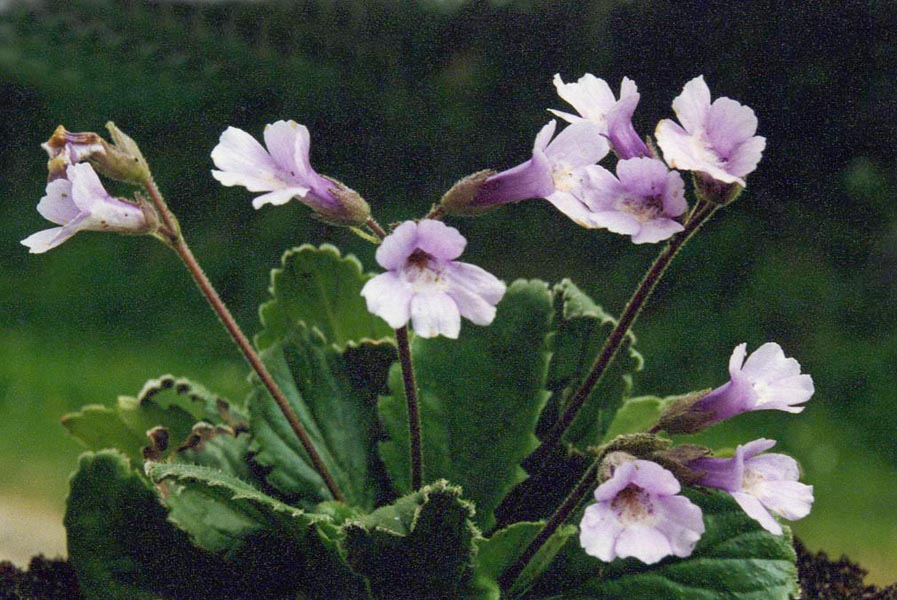
Haberlea rhodopensis

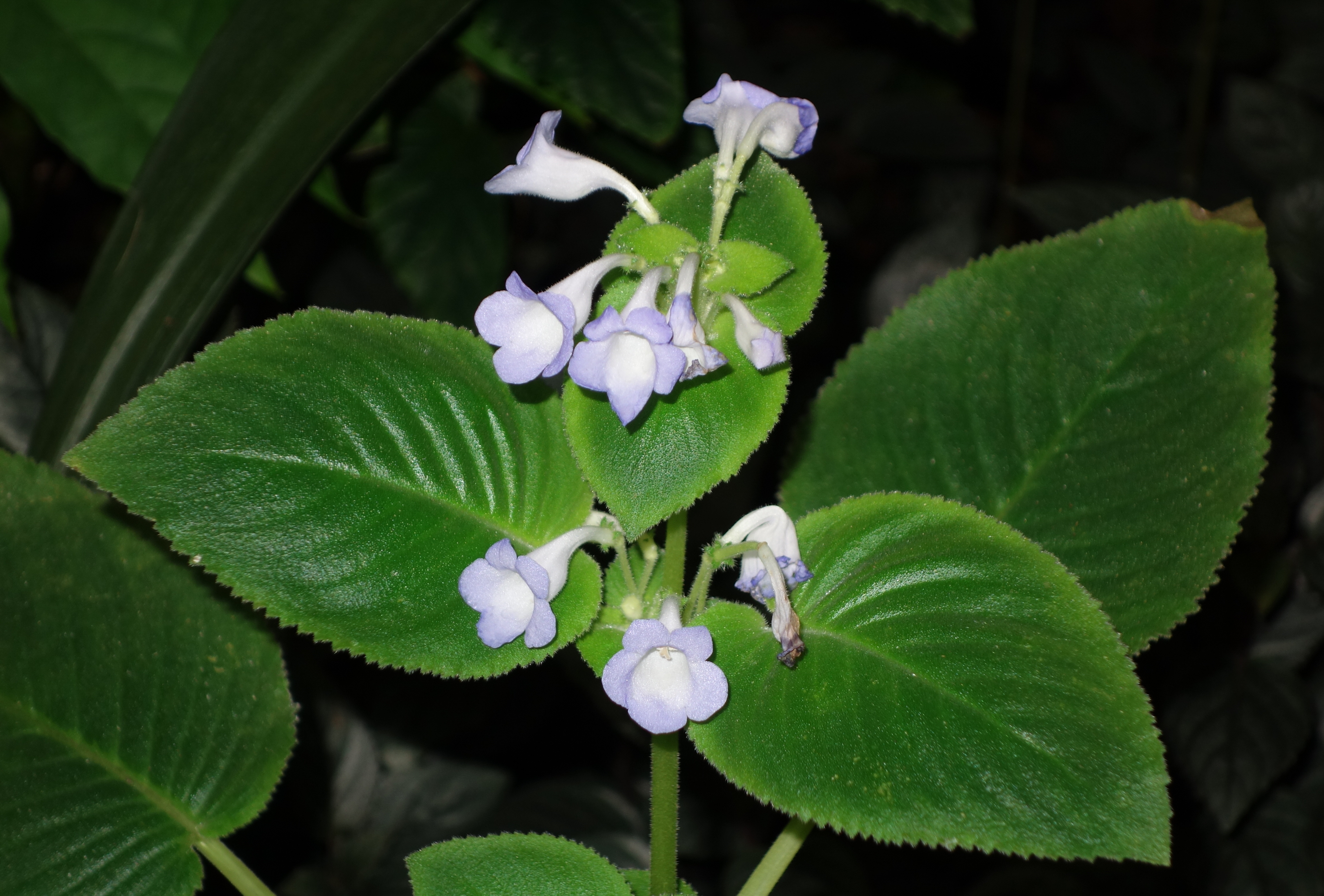
Microchirita lavandulacea

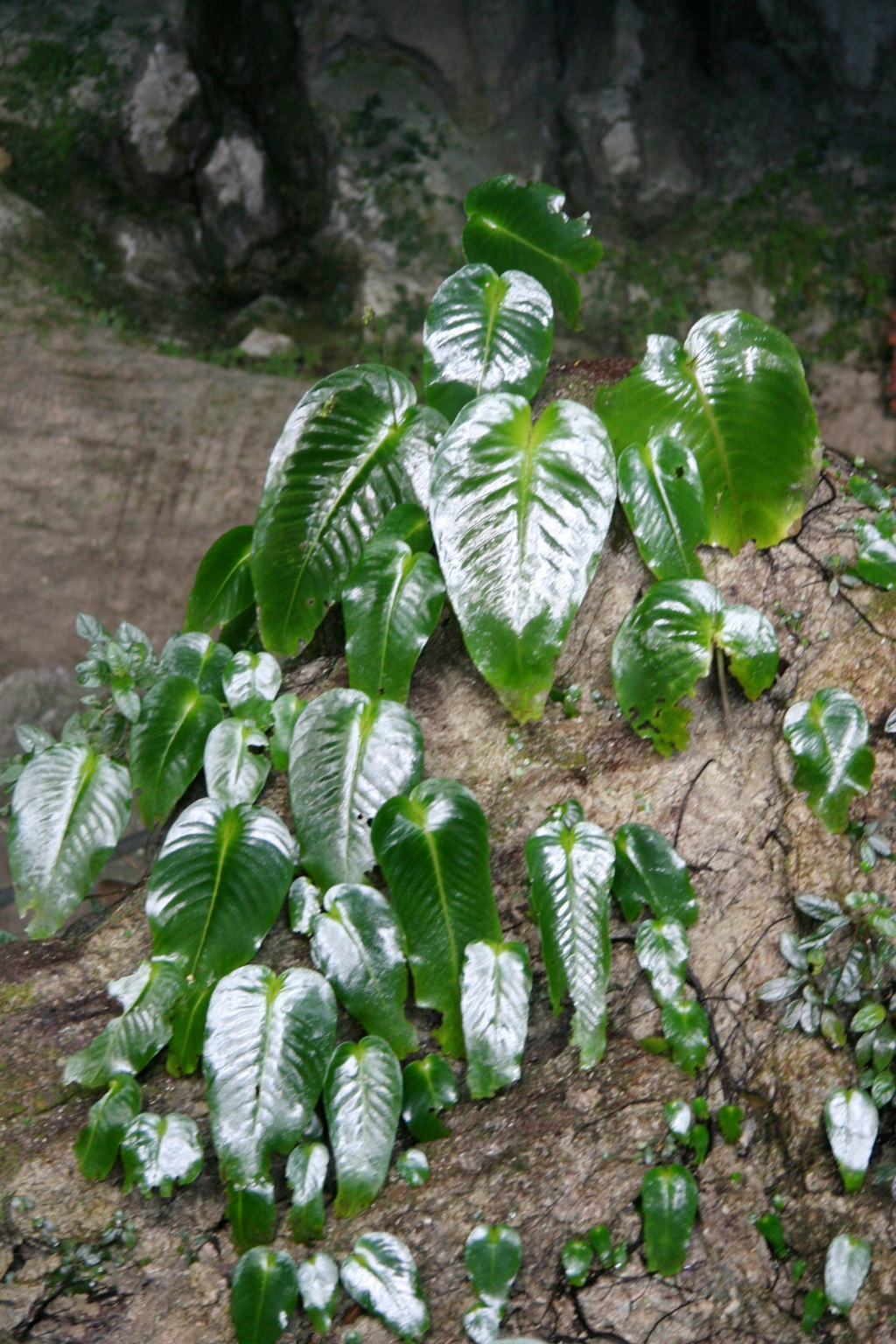
Monophyllaea glauca – each leaf is one separate plant

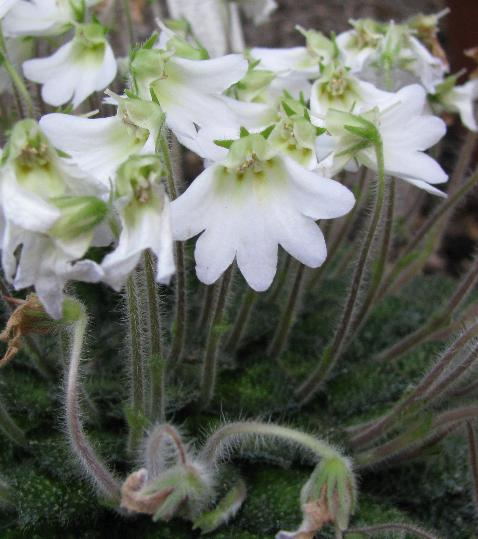
Petrocosmea rosettifolia

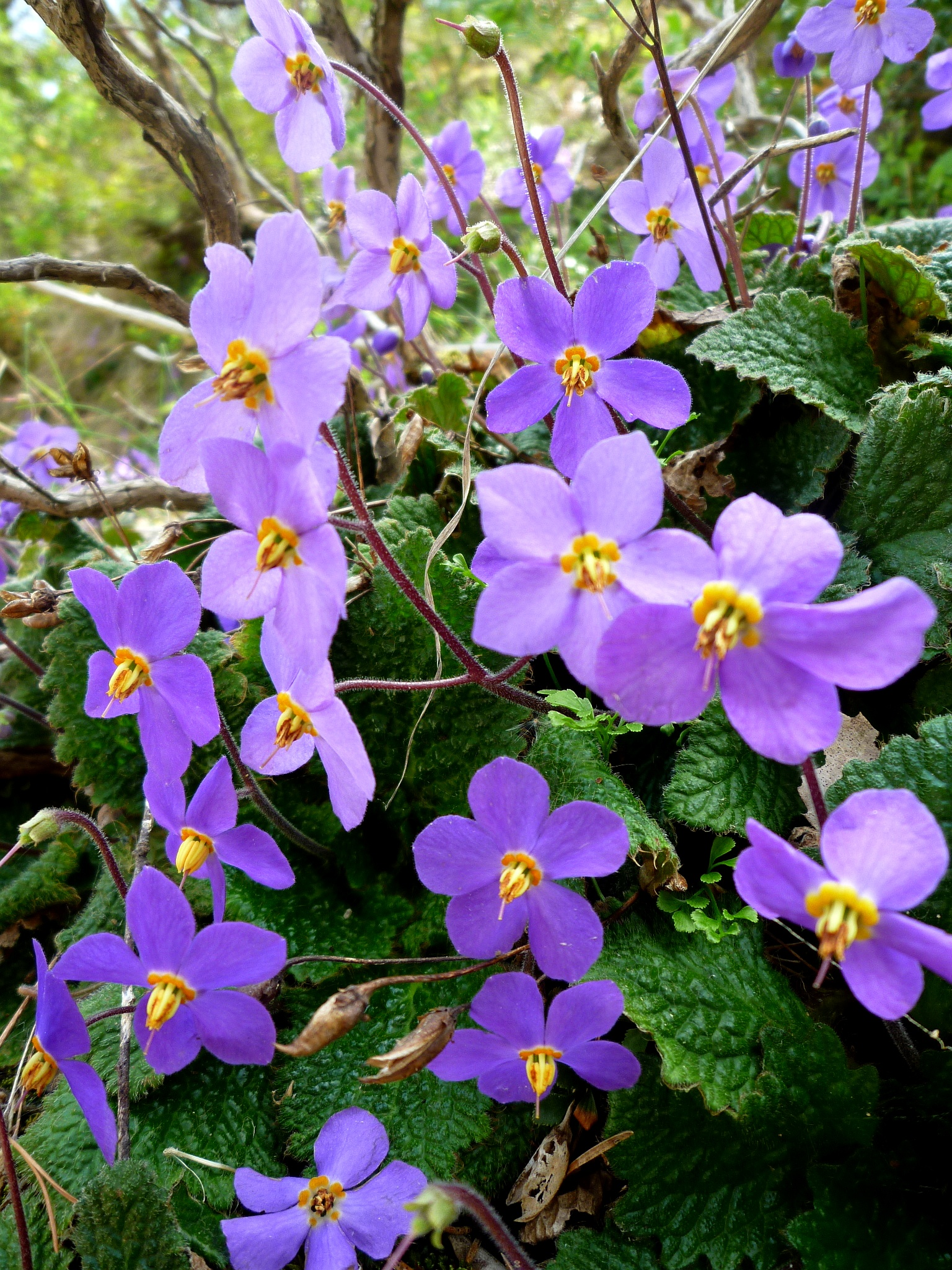
Ramonda myconi

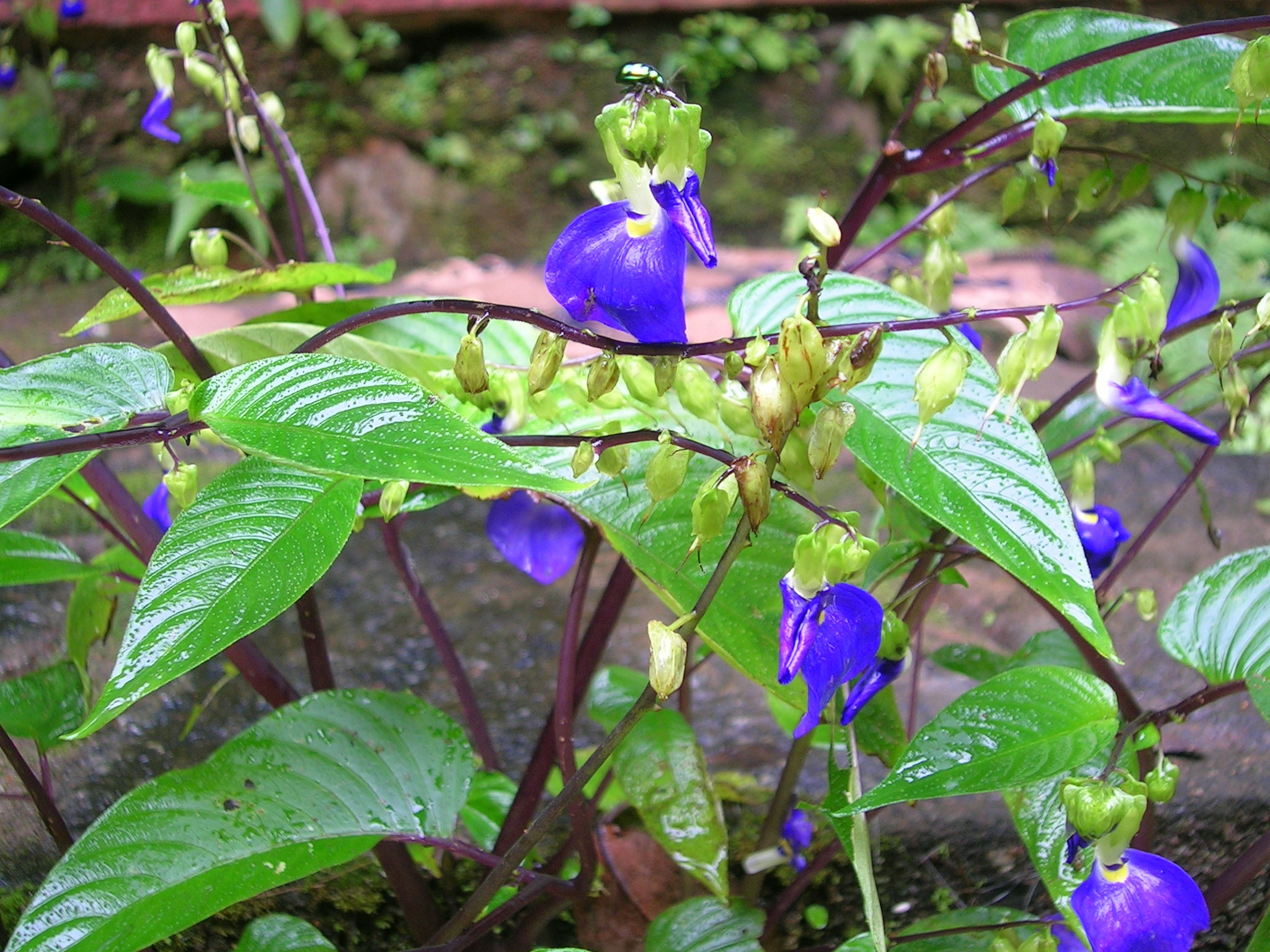
Rhynchoglossum notonianum

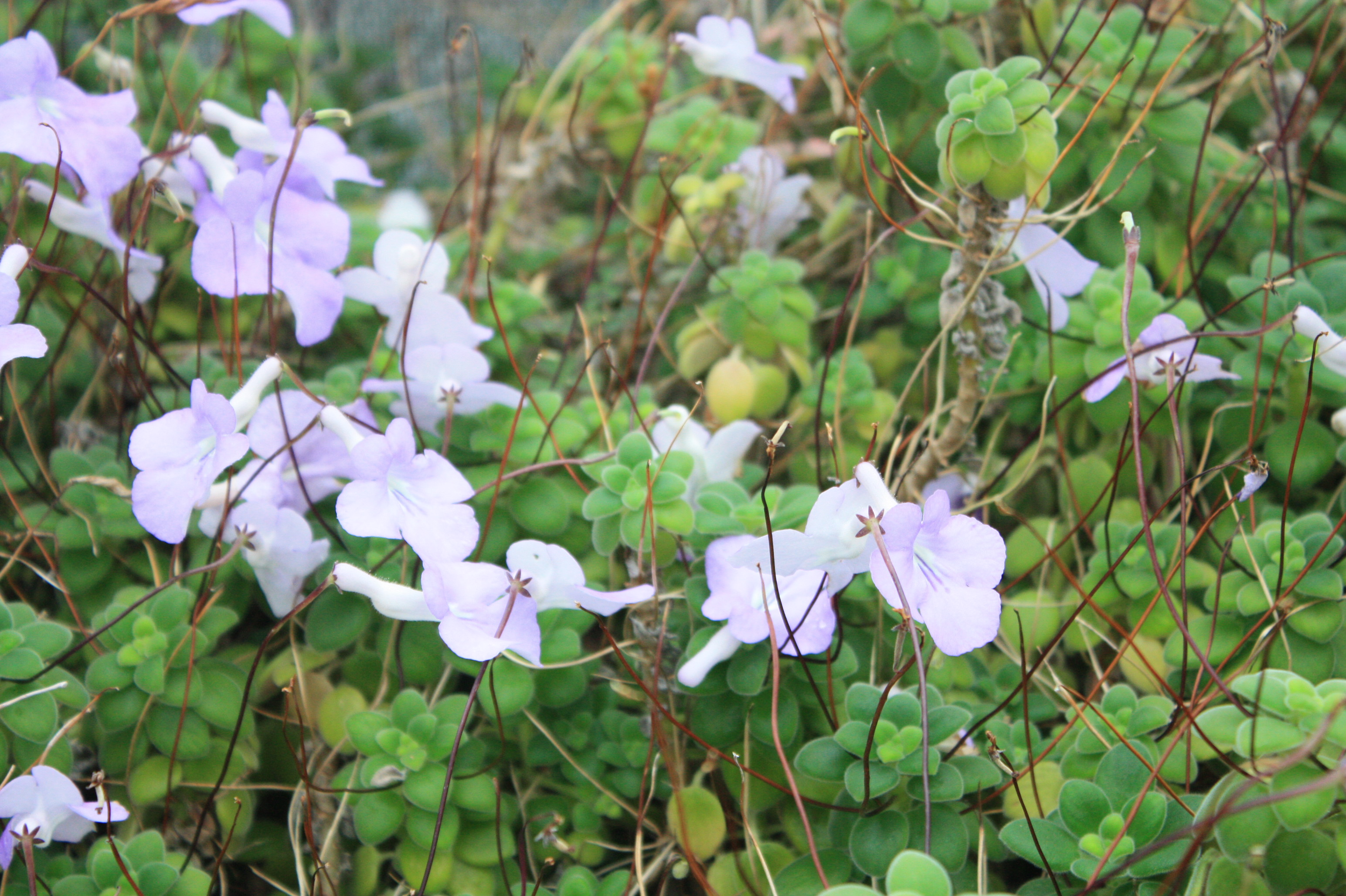
Streptocarpus saxorum

== Distribution ==
The species of the subfamily Didymocarpoideae are native to Europe, Africa, Asia, Malesia, the Pacific and Australia, except for a single species, Rhynchoglossum azureum, which is native to the Neotropics (Central and South America).
