= Pultenaea pauciflora =

Conservation status
- Vulnerable (EPBC Act)

Scientific classification
- Kingdom: Plantae
- Clade: Tracheophytes
- Clade: Angiosperms
- Clade: Eudicots
- Clade: Rosids
- Order: Fabales
- Family: Fabaceae
- Subfamily: Faboideae
- Genus: Pultenaea
- Species: P. pauciflora

Binomial name
- Pultenaea pauciflora M.B.Scott

Species of legume

Pultenaea pauciflora, commonly known as Narrogin pea, is a species of flowering plant in the family Fabaceae and is endemic to the south-west of Western Australia. It is a dense, erect, much-branched shrub with sickle-shaped leaves with a sharp point on the tip, and uniformly yellow flowers.

== Description ==
Pultenaea pauciflora is a dense, erect, much-branched shrub that typically grows to a height of up to 80 cm (31 in). The leaves are sickle-shaped, 12–25 mm (0.47–0.98 in) long and 1–2.5 mm (0.039–0.098 in) wide with stipules 1.4–1.6 mm (0.055–0.063 in) long at the base. There is a sharp point 1.5–2 mm (0.059–0.079 in) long on the end of the leaves. The flowers are uniform yellow, borne singly or in pairs in leaf axils at the ends of the branchlets, and are sessile. The sepals are hairy and 5.5–7.5 mm (0.22–0.30 in) long with hairy bracteoles 2.3–4.5 mm (0.091–0.177 in) long at the base. The standard petal is 12–13 mm (0.47–0.51 in) long, the wings 10.5–11.2 mm (0.41–0.44 in) long and the keel 10.5–11 mm (0.41–0.43 in) long. Flowering occurs from October to November and the fruit is an egg-shaped about pod 9 mm (0.35 in) long.

== Taxonomy ==
Pultenaea pauciflora was first formally described in 1914 by Munro Briggs Scott in Bulletin of Miscellaneous Information, Royal Gardens, Kew from specimens collected at the Narrogin Experiment Farm. The specific epithet, pauciflora, is derived from the Latin words, paucus (pauci-), meaning "few", and flos (floris) meaning "flower" to give a compound Botanical Latin adjective meaning "few-flowered" or "having few flowers".

== Distribution and habitat ==
Narrogin pea grows in sandy soil in woodland in scattered populations, including near Narrogin, Boddington and Brookton, in the Avon Wheatbelt and Jarrah Forest biogeographic regions of south-western Western Australia.

== Conservation status ==
Pultenaea ochreata is classified as "vulnerable" under the Australian Government Environment Protection and Biodiversity Conservation Act 1999 and as "Threatened Flora (Declared Rare Flora — Extant)" by the Department of Environment and Conservation (Western Australia).
