= Stauranthera =

Scientific classification
- Kingdom: Plantae
- Clade: Embryophytes
- Clade: Tracheophytes
- Clade: Spermatophytes
- Clade: Angiosperms
- Clade: Eudicots
- Clade: Asterids
- Order: Lamiales
- Family: Gesneriaceae
- Subfamily: Didymocarpoideae
- Genus: Stauranthera; Benth. (1835)

Species
- See text

Synonyms
- Anomorhegmia Meisn. (1840); Cyananthus Griff. (1854), nom. illeg.; Miquelia Blume (1838), nom. illeg.; Quintilia Endl. (1841)

Genus of flowering plants

Stauranthera is a genus of flowering plants in the family Gesneriaceae, native to Bangladesh, the Nicobar Islands, Assam, the eastern Himalayas, south-central and southeast China (including Hainan), Southeast Asia, and Malesia to New Guinea. It is very close morphologically and genetically to Loxonia.

== Species ==
Currently accepted species include:

- Stauranthera argyrescens Hallier f.
- Stauranthera coerulea (Blume) Merr.
- Stauranthera floribunda F.Su, C.Y.Hao & K.Tan
- Stauranthera grandifolia Benth.
- Stauranthera ionantha Hallier f.
- Stauranthera novoguineensis B.L.Burtt
- Stauranthera parvifolia S.Moore
- Stauranthera umbrosa (Griff.) C.B.Clarke
