= Briggsia (disambiguation) =

Briggsia may refer to:

- Briggsia, genus of clingfishes
- Briggsia (plant), former genus in the family Gesneriacae
