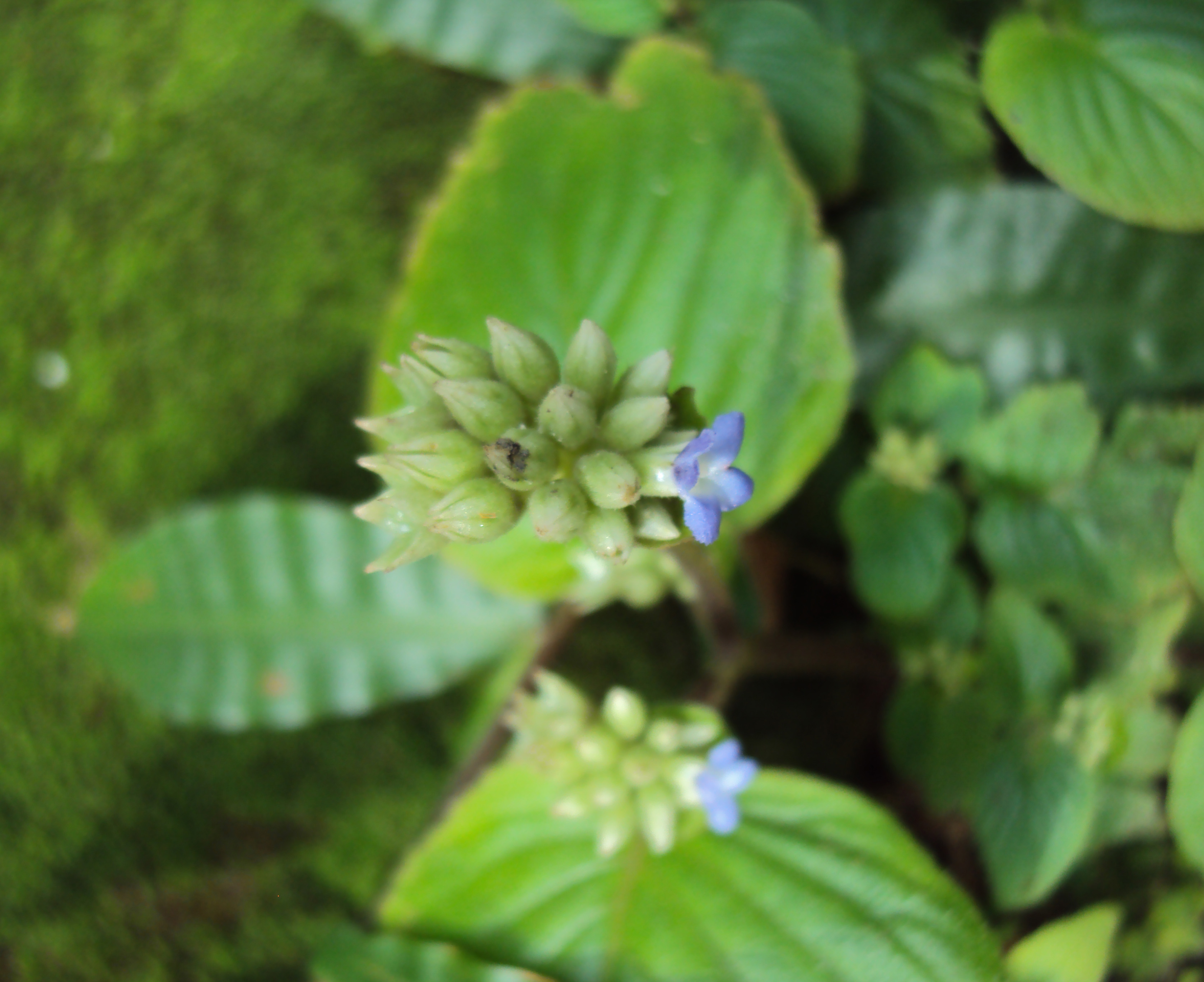
- Epithema carnosum var. hispida

Scientific classification
- Kingdom: Plantae
- Clade: Tracheophytes
- Clade: Angiosperms
- Clade: Eudicots
- Clade: Asterids
- Order: Lamiales
- Family: Gesneriaceae
- Subfamily: Didymocarpoideae
- Genus: Epithema; Blume (1826)

Synonyms
- Aikinia R.Br. (1832), nom. illeg.; Carpocalymna Zipp. (1829)

= Epithema =

Genus of flowering plants

Epithema is a genus of plants in the family Gesneriaceae and subfamily Didymocarpoideae. Species range from western tropical Africa to Uganda, tropical and subtropical Asia, and New Guinea.

== Species ==
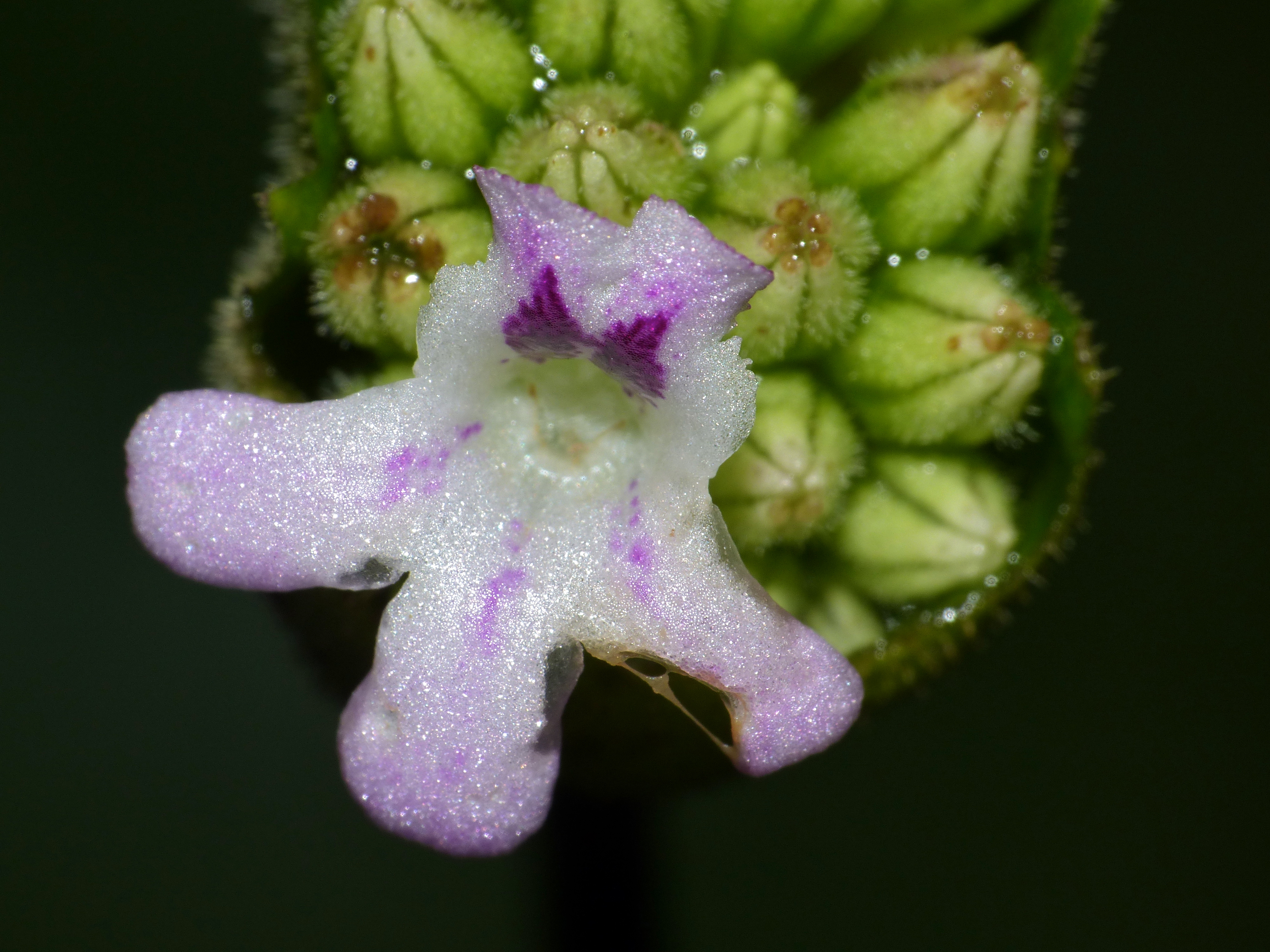
Epithema sarawakense flower

20 species are accepted.

- Epithema benthamii C.B.Clarke
- Epithema carnosum Benth.
- Epithema ceylanicum Gardner
- Epithema dolichopodum Hilliard & B.L.Burtt
- Epithema horsfieldii (R.Br.) DC.
- Epithema involucratum (Roxb.) B.L.Burtt
- Epithema longipetiolatum (Merr.) Hilliard & B.L.Burtt
- Epithema longitubum Hilliard & B.L.Burtt
- Epithema madulidii Hilliard & B.L.Burtt
- Epithema membranaceum (King) Kiew
- Epithema parvibracteatum Hilliard & B.L.Burtt
- Epithema philippinum (Hilliard & B.L.Burtt) Bransgr.
- Epithema pusillum (C.B.Clarke) Bransgr.
- Epithema rennellense Hilliard & B.L.Burtt
- Epithema sarawakense Hilliard & B.L.Burtt
- Epithema saxatile Blume
- Epithema steenisii Hilliard & B.L.Burtt
- Epithema strigosum (C.B.Clarke) Hilliard & B.L.Burtt
- Epithema tenerum (C.B.Clarke) Hilliard & B.L.Burtt
- Epithema tenue C.B.Clarke
