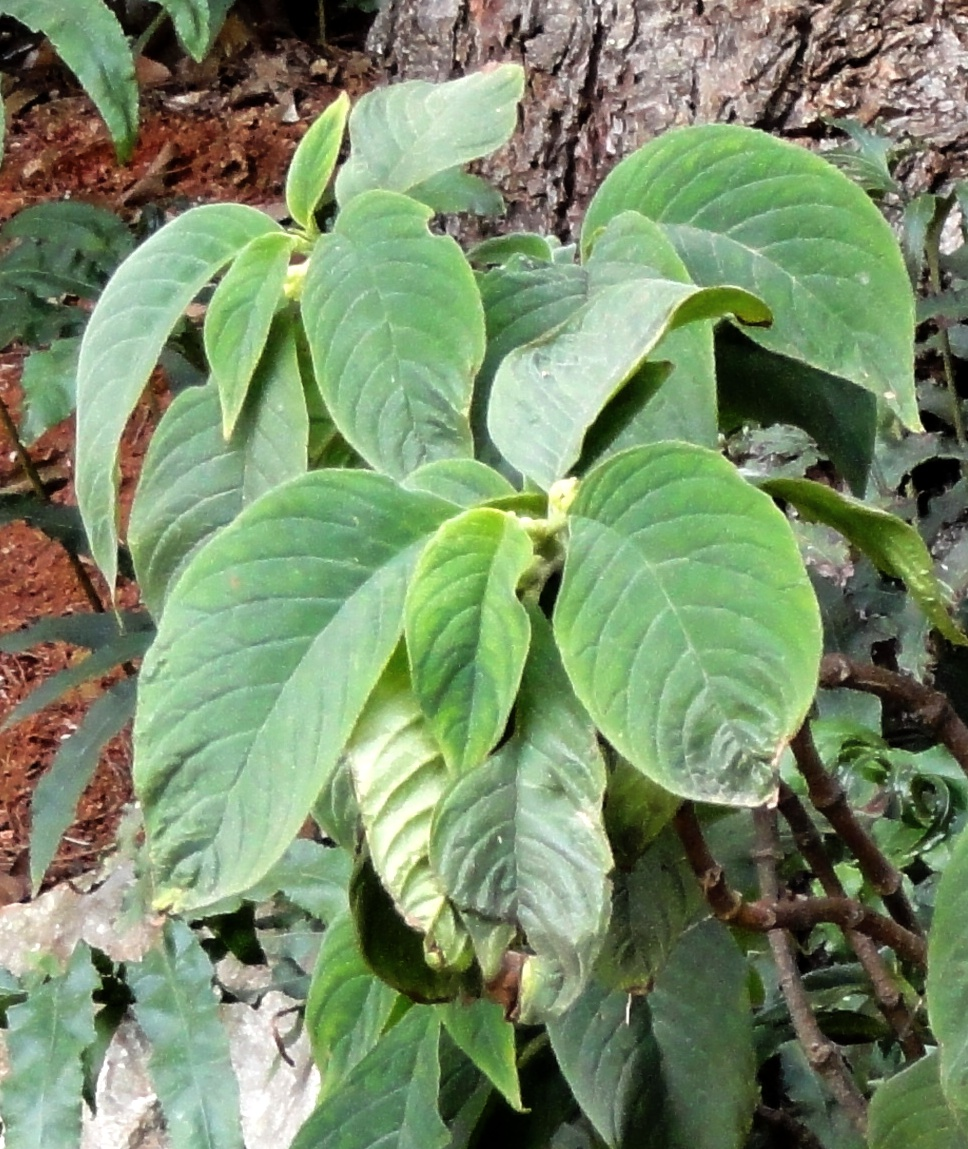
- Anna mollifolia

Scientific classification
- Kingdom: Plantae
- Clade: Tracheophytes
- Clade: Angiosperms
- Clade: Eudicots
- Clade: Asterids
- Order: Lamiales
- Family: Gesneriaceae
- Subfamily: Didymocarpoideae
- Genus: Anna; Pellegr. (1930)

Species
- 4; see text

Synonyms
- Tumidinodus H.W.Li (1983)

= Anna (plant) =

Genus of flowering plants

Anna is a genus of flowering plants in the family Gesneriaceae. It includes four species native to Vietnam and southern China.

== Species ==
Four species are accepted.

- Anna mollifolia (W.T.Wang) W.T.Wang & K.Y.Pan
- Anna ophiorrhizoides (Hemsl.) B.L.Burtt & R.A.Davidson
- Anna rubidiflora S.Z.He, F.Wen & Y.G.Wei
- Anna submontana Pellegr.
