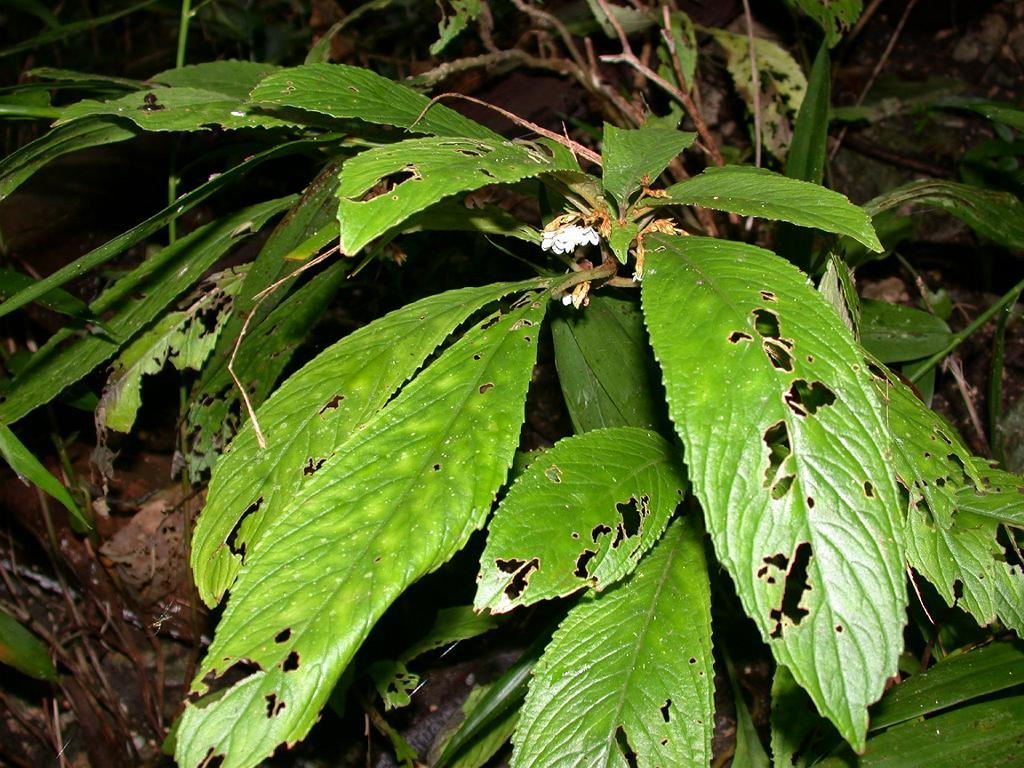
- Rhynchotechum discolor

Scientific classification
- Kingdom: Plantae
- Clade: Tracheophytes
- Clade: Angiosperms
- Clade: Eudicots
- Clade: Asterids
- Order: Lamiales
- Family: Gesneriaceae
- Subfamily: Didymocarpoideae
- Genus: Rhynchotechum; Blume

Synonyms
- Cheilosandra Griff. ex Lindl.; Chiliandra' Griff.; Corysanthera Wall. ex Endl.; Isanthera Nees

= Rhynchotechum =

Genus of flowering plants

Rhynchotechum is a genus of plants in the family Gesneriaceae, subfamily Didymocarpoideae. Species distribution records are mostly from India, Sri Lanka, China through to southern Japan, Indo-China and Malesia through to New Guinea.

== Species ==
Plants of the World Online lists:

- Rhynchotechum alternifolium C.B.Clarke
- Rhynchotechum angustifolium Ridl.
- Rhynchotechum brandisii C.B.Clarke
- Rhynchotechum brevipedunculatum J.C.Wang
- Rhynchotechum burmanicum B.M.Anderson
- Rhynchotechum calycinum C.B.Clarke
- Rhynchotechum copelandii (Elmer) Merr.
- Rhynchotechum discolor (Maxim.) B.L.Burtt
- Rhynchotechum ellipticum (Wall. ex D.Dietr.) A.DC.
- Rhynchotechum eximium (C.B.Clarke) Schltr.
- Rhynchotechum formosanum Hatus.
- Rhynchotechum gracile B.M.Anderson
- Rhynchotechum hispidum C.B.Clarke
- Rhynchotechum hookeri (C.B.Clarke) B.M.Anderson
- Rhynchotechum lalashanense S.S.Ying
- Rhynchotechum longipes W.T.Wang
- Rhynchotechum nirijuliense Taram & D.Borah
- Rhynchotechum obovatum (Griff.) B.L.Burtt
- Rhynchotechum parviflorum Blume
- Rhynchotechum permolle (Nees) B.L.Burtt
- Rhynchotechum polycarpum (K.Schum.) Schltr.
- Rhynchotechum uniflorum S.S.Ying
- Rhynchotechum vestitum Wall. ex C.B.Clarke
- Rhynchotechum vietnamense B.M.Anderson
