= Tetraphyllum =

Scientific classification
- Kingdom: Plantae
- Clade: Tracheophytes
- Clade: Angiosperms
- Clade: Eudicots
- Clade: Asterids
- Order: Lamiales
- Family: Gesneriaceae
- Subfamily: Didymocarpoideae
- Genus: Tetraphyllum; Griff. ex C.B.Clarke

Species
- See text

Synonyms
- Tetraphylloides Doweld, nomen novum, necessity disputed

Genus of flowering plants

Tetraphyllum is a genus of flowering plants belonging to the family Gesneriaceae. As of April 2021, there was no consensus as to whether the correct scientific name for the genus is Tetraphyllum or Tetraphylloides, some sources using the former and some the latter.

Its native range is Eastern Himalaya to Indo-China.

== Description ==
Species of Tetraphyllum are perennial herbaceous plants. They have erect stems, which die after flowering (monocarpic). Typically the stems have what appears to be a whorl of four leaves at the very top of the stem with pairs of scale leaves lower down. The flowers are arranged in short cymes. The fused petals are pink or blue, forming a wide funnel shape. There are either four or two stamens. The fruit is a capsule that splits into four valves.

== Taxonomy ==
The genus name Tetraphyllum for plants in the family Gesneriaceae was first published in 1883 by Charles Baron Clarke, with the name attributed to William Griffith. Earlier, in 1880, A. Hosius and W. von der Marck had published the same genus name for a fossil, which they considered might be a plant, classifying it as "Plantae incertae sedis". If both names were published under the botanical code (now the International Code of Nomenclature for algae, fungi, and plants; ICNafp), then Tetraphyllum Griff. ex C.B.Clarke is an illegitimate later homonym of Tetraphyllum A.Hosius & W. von der Marck. On this basis, in 2018, Alexander Borissovitch Doweld published the replacement name Tetraphylloides, which the International Plant Names Index (IPNI) and Plants of the World Online regarded as the correct name as of April 2021. However, as early as 1881 it was doubted whether the fossil named in 1880 was actually a plant, and in 2019, Markus Bertling treated the 1880 name as applying to a trace fossil, and hence an ichnotaxon name not subject to the ICNafp, arguing that this rendered the 1883 name legitimate. IPNI does not accept this argument, on the grounds that the botanical status of the name, and hence its illegitimacy, applies at the time it was published. A 2020 key to the Gesneriaceae accepts Bertling's view and uses the name Tetraphyllum.

Tetraphyllum is placed in subfamily Didymocarpoideae, tribe Trichosporeae.

=== Species ===
As of April 2021, Plants of the World Online accepted three species (placing them in the genus Tetraphylloides):

- Tetraphyllum bengalense C.B.Clarke, syn. Tetraphylloides bengalensis (C.B.Clarke) Doweld
- Tetraphyllum confertiflorum (Drake) B.L.Burtt, syn. Tetraphylloides confertiflora (Drake) Doweld
- Tetraphyllum roseum Stapf, syn. Tetraphylloides roseus (Stapf) Doweld
