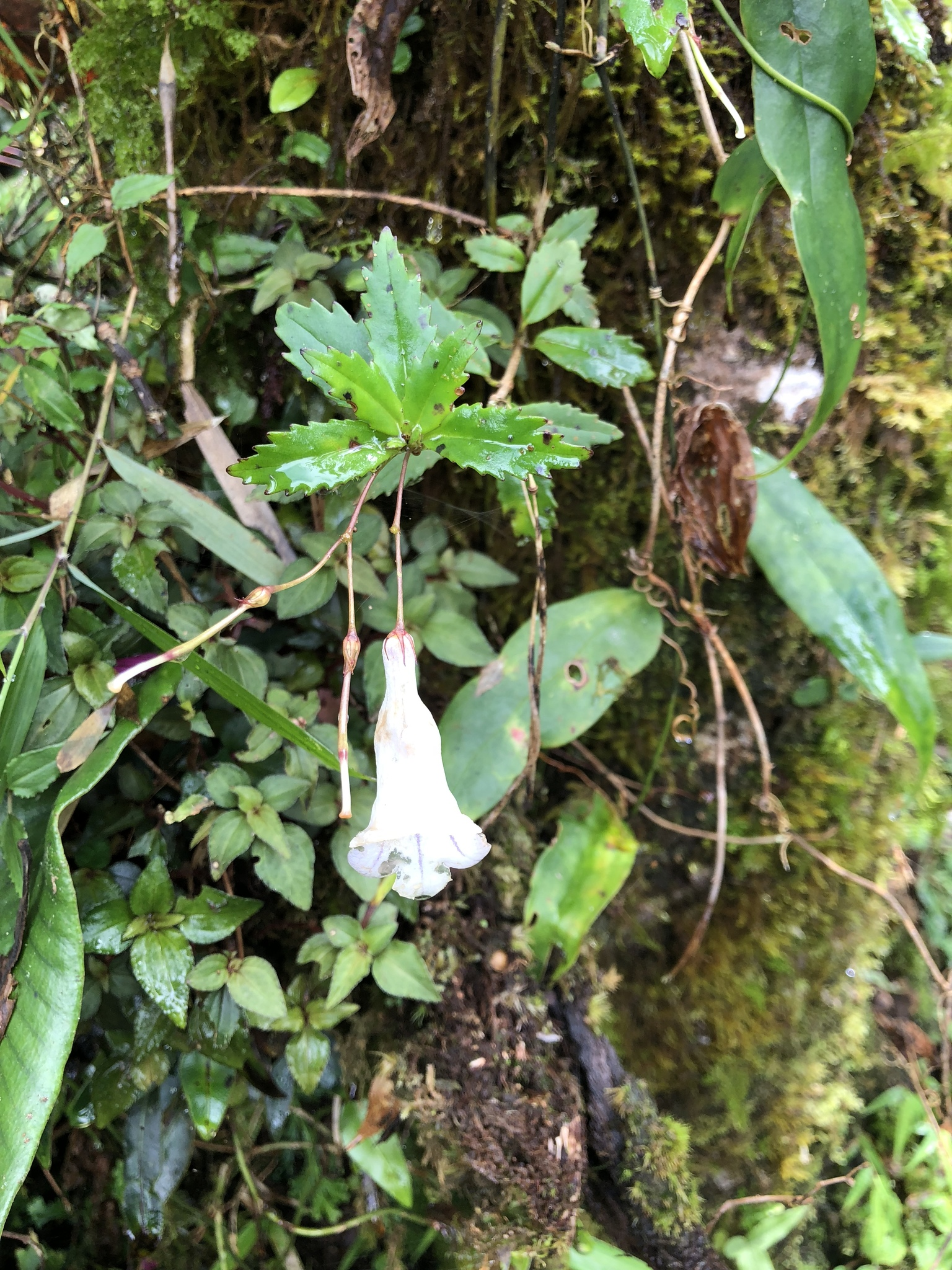
- Lysionotus pauciflorus

Scientific classification
- Kingdom: Plantae
- Clade: Embryophytes
- Clade: Tracheophytes
- Clade: Spermatophytes
- Clade: Angiosperms
- Clade: Eudicots
- Clade: Asterids
- Order: Lamiales
- Family: Gesneriaceae
- Subfamily: Didymocarpoideae
- Genus: Lysionotus; D.Don (1822)

Species
- 35; see text

= Lysionotus =

Genus of flowering plants

Lysionotus is a genus of flowering plants in the family Gesneriaceae (subfamily Didymocarpoideae, tribe Trichosporeae). It occurs in the Himalayas, China, Japan, and Southeast Asia. The genus was described by David Don in 1822.

== Species ==
As of July 2026, Plants of the World Online accepts the following 37 species:

- Lysionotus aeschynanthoides W.T.Wang
- Lysionotus atropurpureus H.Hara
- Lysionotus calcicola Phonep., Soulad. & Souvann.
- Lysionotus cangyuanensis C.Liu, W.G.Wang & H.C.Xi
- Lysionotus chatungii Taram, A.P.Das & Tag
- Lysionotus chingii Chun ex W.T.Wang
- Lysionotus coccinus G.W.Hu & Q.F.Wang
- Lysionotus confertus C.B.Clarke
- Lysionotus denticulosus W.T.Wang
- Lysionotus fengshanensis Yan Liu & D.X.Nong
- Lysionotus forrestii W.W.Sm.
- Lysionotus gamosepalus W.T.Wang
- Lysionotus gracilis W.W.Sm.
- Lysionotus hagiangensis C.H.Nguyen & Aver.
- Lysionotus heterophyllus Franch.
- Lysionotus involucratus Franch.
- Lysionotus kingii (C.B.Clarke) Hilliard
- Lysionotus kwangsiensis W.T.Wang
- Lysionotus levipes (C.B.Clarke) B.L.Burtt
- Lysionotus longipedunculatus (W.T.Wang) W.T.Wang
- Lysionotus metuoensis W.T.Wang
- Lysionotus microphyllus W.T.Wang
- Lysionotus namchoomii Chowlu, C.H.Nguyen, K.Gogoi & Aver.
- Lysionotus oblongifolius W.T.Wang
- Lysionotus palinensis G.D.Pal
- Lysionotus pauciflorus Maxim.
- Lysionotus petelotii Pellegr.
- Lysionotus pterocaulis (C.Y.Wu ex W.T.Wang) H.W.Li
- Lysionotus pubescens C.B.Clarke
- Lysionotus sangzhiensis W.T.Wang
- Lysionotus serratus D.Don - type species
- Lysionotus sessilifolius Hand.-Mazz.
- Lysionotus sulphureoides H.W.Li & Yuan X.Lu
- Lysionotus sulphureus Hand.-Mazz.
- Lysionotus tairukouensis S.S.Ying
- Lysionotus wilsonii Rehder
- Lysionotus ziroensis Nampy, N.Krishna, Amrutha & M.K.Akhil
