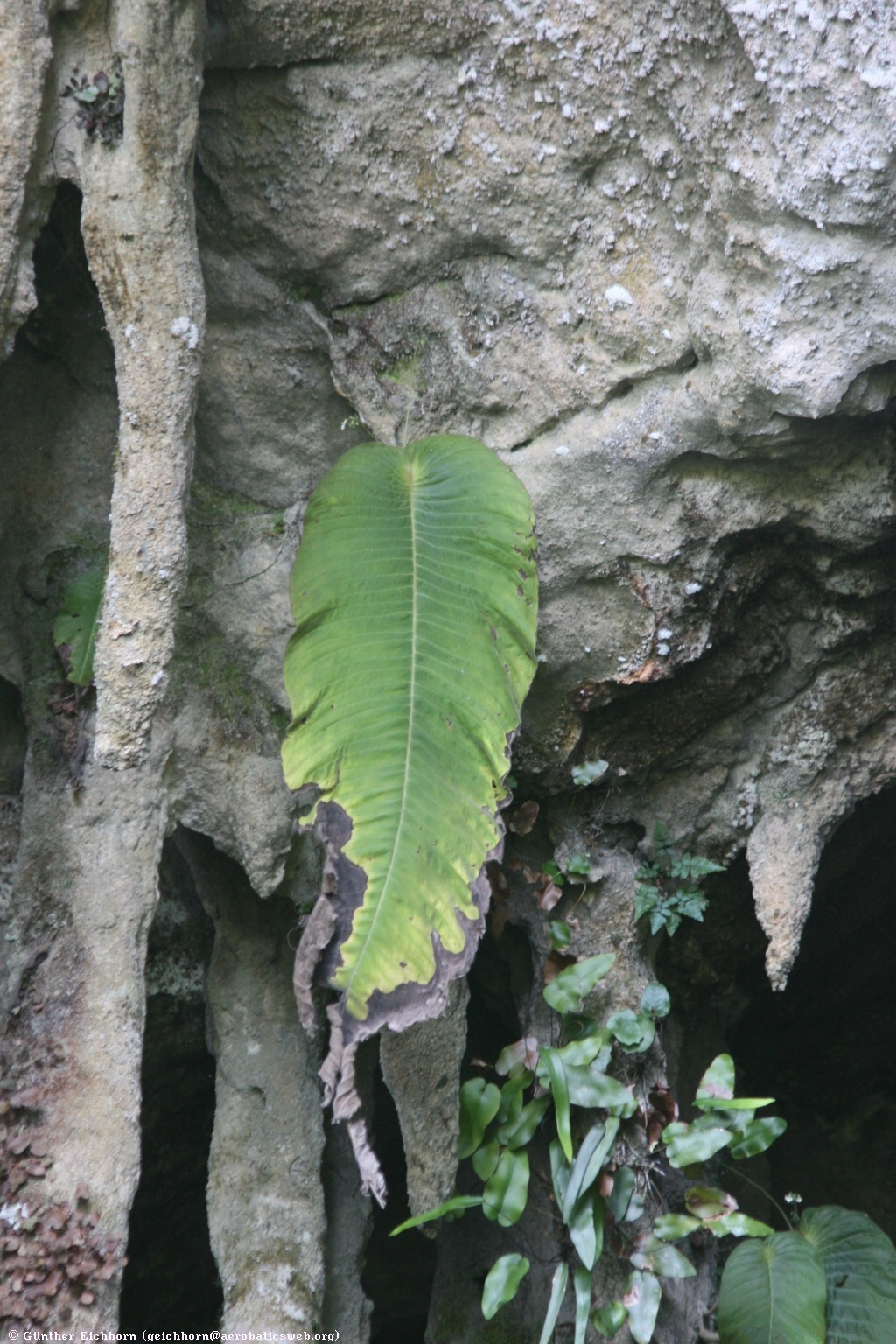
- Monophyllaea pendula (One-leaf plant) in a cave in Sarawak province on Borneo, Malaysia

Scientific classification
- Kingdom: Plantae
- Clade: Embryophytes
- Clade: Tracheophytes
- Clade: Angiosperms
- Clade: Eudicots
- Clade: Asterids
- Order: Lamiales
- Family: Gesneriaceae
- Genus: Monophyllaea
- Species: M. pendula

Binomial name
- Monophyllaea pendula B.L.Burtt

= Monophyllaea pendula =

Species of flowering plant

Monophyllaea pendula are plants that consist of just one leaf.

== Distribution ==
Found only in Sarawak, Borneo, Malaysia.
