= Bournea =

Scientific classification
- Kingdom: Plantae
- Clade: Tracheophytes
- Clade: Angiosperms
- Clade: Eudicots
- Clade: Asterids
- Order: Lamiales
- Family: Gesneriaceae
- Subfamily: Didymocarpoideae
- Genus: Bournea; Oliv. (1893)

Species
- Bournea leiophylla (W.T.Wang) W.T.Wang & K.Y.Pan; Bournea sinensis Oliv.

Genus of flowering plants

Bournea is a genus of flowering plants in the family Gesneriaceae. It includes two species native to southeastern China.

- Bournea leiophylla (W.T.Wang) W.T.Wang & K.Y.Pan
- Bournea sinensis Oliv.
