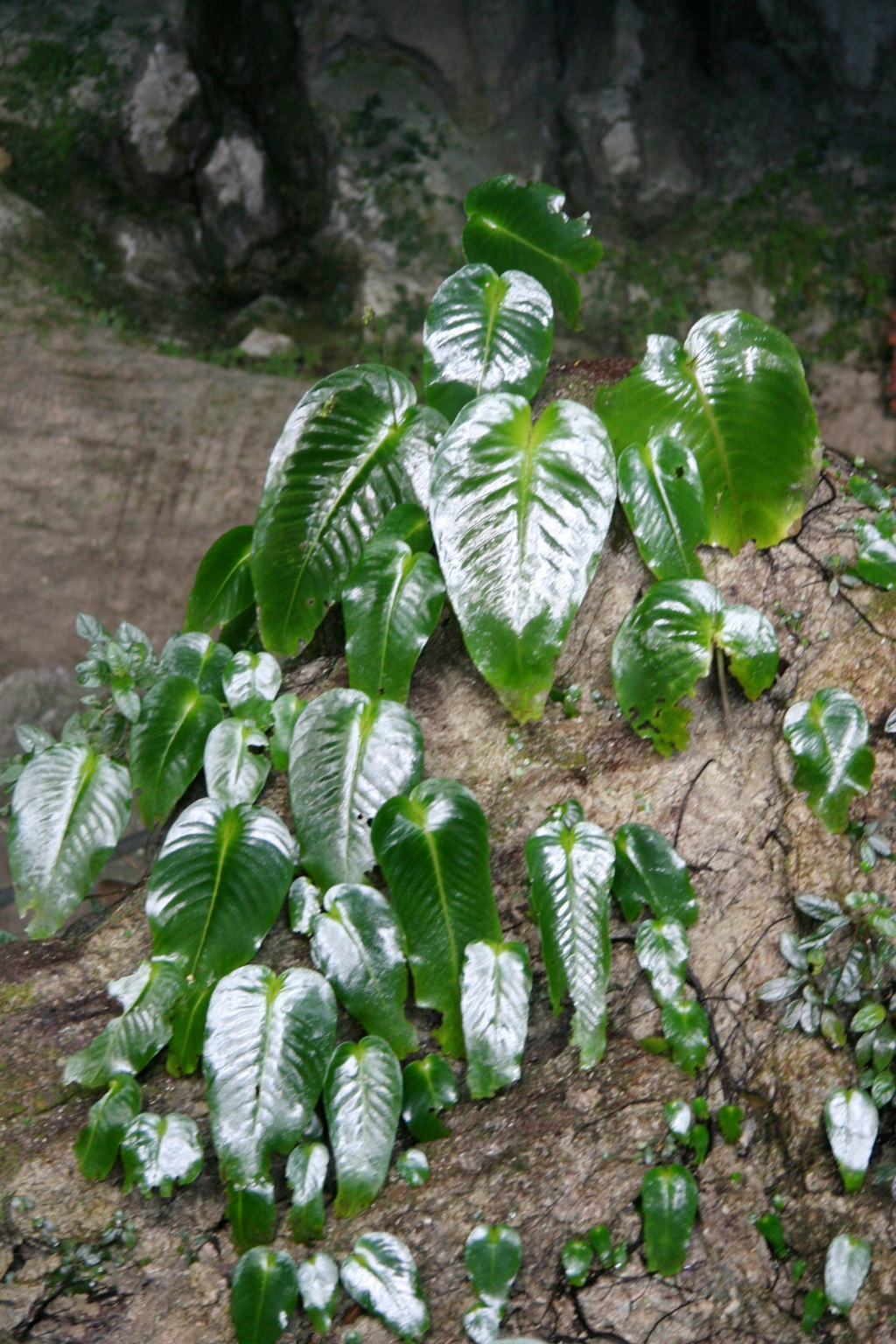
- One-leaf plant (Monophyllaea glauca). Each leaf is a separate plant. The whole plant consists of only one leaf.

Scientific classification
- Kingdom: Plantae
- Clade: Embryophytes
- Clade: Tracheophytes
- Clade: Angiosperms
- Clade: Eudicots
- Clade: Asterids
- Order: Lamiales
- Family: Gesneriaceae
- Subfamily: Didymocarpoideae
- Genus: Monophyllaea; R.Br.

Species
- 38; see text

Synonyms
- Moultonia Balf.f. & W.W.Sm. (1915)

= Monophyllaea =

Genus of flowering plants

Monophyllaea is a genus of plants in the family Gesneriaceae.

The name comes from a comibnation of Ancient Greek μόνος (solitary, alone) and φύλλον (leaf); this is because all of the species only have one leaf.

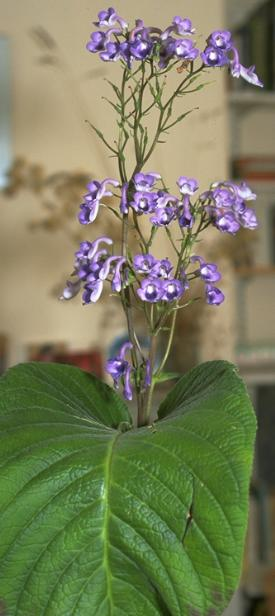
Streptocarpus eylsii, a plant from a different genus that also possesses the characteristic trait of having only one leaf.

It is not the only plant genus with species possessing one leaf; a few species from Streptocarpus have this trait too.

== Species ==
38 species are accepted.

- Monophyllaea albicalyx A. Weber
- Monophyllaea andersonii B.L.Burtt
- Monophyllaea anthocrena B.L.Burtt
- Monophyllaea brevipes S.Moore
- Monophyllaea burttiana R. Kiew
- Monophyllaea caulescens B.L. Burtt
- Monophyllaea chinii B.L.Burtt
- Monophyllaea cupiflora B.L. Burtt
- Monophyllaea elongata B.L.Burtt
- Monophyllaea eymae B.L.Burtt
- Monophyllaea fissilis B.L.Burtt
- Monophyllaea furcipila Ohwi
- Monophyllaea glabra Ridl.
- Monophyllaea glandulosa B.L.Burtt
- Monophyllaea glauca C.B. Clarke
- Monophyllaea hendersonii (B.L.Burtt) A.Weber
- Monophyllaea hirtella Miq.
- Monophyllaea hirticalyx Franch.
- Monophyllaea horsfieldii R.Br.
- Monophyllaea hottae B.L.Burtt
- Monophyllaea insignis B.L. Burtt
- Monophyllaea kostermansii B.L.Burtt
- Monophyllaea leuserensis B.L.Burtt
- Monophyllaea longipes Kraenzl.
- Monophyllaea meriraiensis Kiew & S.Julia
- Monophyllaea merrilliana Kraenzl.
- Monophyllaea musangensis A.Weber
- Monophyllaea papuana Lauterb.
- Monophyllaea pendula B.L.Burtt
- Monophyllaea ramosa B.L.Burtt
- Monophyllaea sarangica B.L.Burtt
- Monophyllaea selaborensis B.L.Burtt
- Monophyllaea singularis (Balf.f. & W.W.Sm.) B.L.Burtt
- Monophyllaea stellata B.L.Burtt
- Monophyllaea tenuis B.L.Burtt
- Monophyllaea tetrasepala B.L.Burtt
- Monophyllaea wildeana B.L.Burtt
