= Monophyllaea horsfieldii =

Scientific classification
- Kingdom: Plantae
- Clade: Embryophytes
- Clade: Tracheophytes
- Clade: Angiosperms
- Clade: Eudicots
- Clade: Asterids
- Order: Lamiales
- Family: Gesneriaceae
- Genus: Monophyllaea
- Species: M. horsfieldii

Binomial name
- Monophyllaea horsfieldii R.Br.

Species of plant

Monophyllaea horsfieldii is a herbaceous lithophyte belonging to the family Gesneriaceae and found mostly on limestone outcropings in Borneo and peninsular Malaysia.

== Description ==
The entire plant consists of a single cotyledon of Brobdingnagian proportions; the blade or lamina can be "over a metre" (over 40 inches) in length and about 30 inches (75 centimeters) wide, topping a massive hypocotyl of similar length. It grows new tissue at the joint of the blade and hypocotyl, while the oldest tissue at the edge gradually dies back.
