= Briggsia (plant) =

Extinct genus of flowering plants

Briggsia was a genus in the family Gesneriacae that consisted of 22 species of herbaceous perennials, native to the Himalayas, China and Vietnam. The genus is no longer recognized, with all of its member species having been relocated to other genera, including Glabrella, Loxostigma, and Oreocharis.

These rhizomous plants are rarely branched. Leaves are few to many, crowded at the tips. Flowers are bell-shaped, 2–3 cm long and 1–2 cm in diameter, with 2-lipped petals in blue, purple, red, orange, or white, and spotted within.

The genus is named in honour of Munro Briggs Scott.

== Species ==
Former species included:

- Briggsia acutiloba K.Y.Pan
- Briggsia agnesiae (Forrest ex W.W.Sm.) Craib
- Briggsia amabilis (Diels) Craib
- Briggsia aurantiaca B.L.Burtt
- Briggsia chienii Chun
- Briggsia dongxingensis Chun ex K.Y.Pan
- Briggsia elegantissima (Lév. & Vaniot) Craib
- Briggsia forrestii Craib
- Briggsia humilis K.Y.Pan
- Briggsia kurzii (C.B.Clarke) W.E.Evans
- Briggsia latisepala Chun ex K.Y.Pan
- Briggsia leiophylla
- Briggsia longicaulis W.T.Wang & K.Y.Pan
- Briggsia longifolia Craib
- Briggsia longipes (Hemsl. ex Oliv.) Craib
- Briggsia mairei Craib
- Briggsia mihieri (Franch.) Craib
- Briggsia parvifolia K.Y.Pan
- Briggsia pinfaensis (Lév.) Craib
- Briggsia rosthornii (Diels) B.L.Burtt
- Briggsia speciosa (Hemsl.) Craib
- Briggsia stewardii Chun
