= Middletonia (plant) =

Scientific classification
- Kingdom: Plantae
- Clade: Tracheophytes
- Clade: Angiosperms
- Clade: Eudicots
- Clade: Asterids
- Order: Lamiales
- Family: Gesneriaceae
- Subfamily: Didymocarpoideae
- Genus: Middletonia; C.Puglisi (2016)

Species
- 5; see text

Genus of flowering plants

Middletonia is a genus of flowering plants in the family Gesneriaceae. It includes five species native to Asia, ranging from the eastern Himalayas through Indochina to Peninsular Malaysia and southern China.

== Species ==
Five species are accepted.

- Middletonia evrardii (Pellegr.) C.Puglisi
- Middletonia glebosa C.Puglisi
- Middletonia multiflora (R.Br.) C.Puglisi
- Middletonia regularis (Ridl.) C.Puglisi
- Middletonia reticulata (Barnett) C.Puglisi
