= Whytockia =

Scientific classification
- Kingdom: Plantae
- Clade: Tracheophytes
- Clade: Angiosperms
- Clade: Eudicots
- Clade: Asterids
- Order: Lamiales
- Family: Gesneriaceae
- Subfamily: Didymocarpoideae
- Genus: Whytockia; W.W.Sm.

Synonyms
- Oshimella Masam. & Suzuki

Genus of flowering plants

Whytockia is a genus of flowering plants belonging to the family Gesneriaceae.

Its native range is southern China and Taiwan.

== Known species ==
As accepted by Plants of the World Online:

- Whytockia bijieensis Yin Z.Wang & Z.Yu Li
- Whytockia chiritiflora (Oliv.) W.W.Sm.
- Whytockia gongshanensis Yin Z.Wang & H.Li
- Whytockia hekouensis Yin Z.Wang
- Whytockia purpurascens Yin Z.Wang
- Whytockia sasakii (Hayata) B.L.Burtt
- Whytockia tsiangiana (Hand.-Mazz.) A.Weber
- Whytockia wilsonii (A.Weber) Yin Z.Wang

The genus name of Whytockia is in honour of James Whytock (1845–1926), an English gardener in Ireland and at various Scottish castles and estates. He was also president of the Scottish Horticultural Association and the Botanical Society of Edinburgh. It was first described and published in Trans. Bot. Soc. Edinburgh Vol.27 on page 338 in 1919.
