= Damrongia =

- Damrongia orientalis

Scientific classification
- Kingdom: Plantae
- Clade: Tracheophytes
- Clade: Angiosperms
- Clade: Eudicots
- Clade: Asterids
- Order: Lamiales
- Family: Gesneriaceae
- Subfamily: Didymocarpoideae
- Genus: Damrongia; Kerr ex Craib

Species
- See text

Genus of Gesneriaceae plants

Damrongia is a genus of flowering plants in the Gesneriad family, centered in Thailand and found in southern China, Southeast Asia, and Sumatra. Species were reassigned to it in 2016 in a revision of Loxocarpinae.

== Species ==
Currently accepted species include:

- Damrongia burmanica (Craib) C.Puglisi
- Damrongia clarkeana (Hemsl.) C.Puglisi
- Damrongia cyanea (Ridl.) D.J.Middleton & A.Weber
- Damrongia fulva (Barnett) D.J.Middleton & A.Weber
- Damrongia integra (Barnett) D.J.Middleton & A.Weber
- Damrongia lacunosa (Hook.f.) D.J.Middleton & A.Weber
- Damrongia orientalis (Craib) C.Puglisi
- Damrongia purpureolineata Kerr ex Craib
- Damrongia sumatrana (B.L.Burtt) C.Puglisi
- Damrongia tribounii C.Puglisi
- Damrongia trisepala (Barnett) D.J.Middleton & A.Weber
