= Didymostigma =

Scientific classification
- Kingdom: Plantae
- Clade: Tracheophytes
- Clade: Angiosperms
- Clade: Eudicots
- Clade: Asterids
- Order: Lamiales
- Family: Gesneriaceae
- Genus: Didymostigma; W.T.Wang (1984)

Genus of plants

Didymostigma is a genus of flowering plants belonging to the family Gesneriaceae. It includes two species native to southeastern China and Hainan.

Species:

- Didymostigma leiophyllum D.Fang & Xiao H.Lu
- Didymostigma obtusum (C.B.Clarke) W.T.Wang
