= Gyrogyne =

Scientific classification
- Kingdom: Plantae
- Clade: Tracheophytes
- Clade: Angiosperms
- Clade: Eudicots
- Clade: Asterids
- Order: Lamiales
- Family: Gesneriaceae
- Genus: Gyrogyne; W.T.Wang (1981)
- Species: G. subaequifolia

Binomial name
- Gyrogyne subaequifolia W.T.Wang (1981)

Genus of plants

Gyrogyne is a genus of flowering plants belonging to the family Gesneriaceae.

Its native range is Southeastern China.

Species:

- Gyrogyne subaequifolia W.T.Wang
