= Hemiboea =

Scientific classification
- Kingdom: Plantae
- Clade: Tracheophytes
- Clade: Angiosperms
- Clade: Eudicots
- Clade: Asterids
- Order: Lamiales
- Family: Gesneriaceae
- Genus: Hemiboea; C.B.Clarke

Synonyms
- Metabriggsia W.T.Wang

Genus of plants

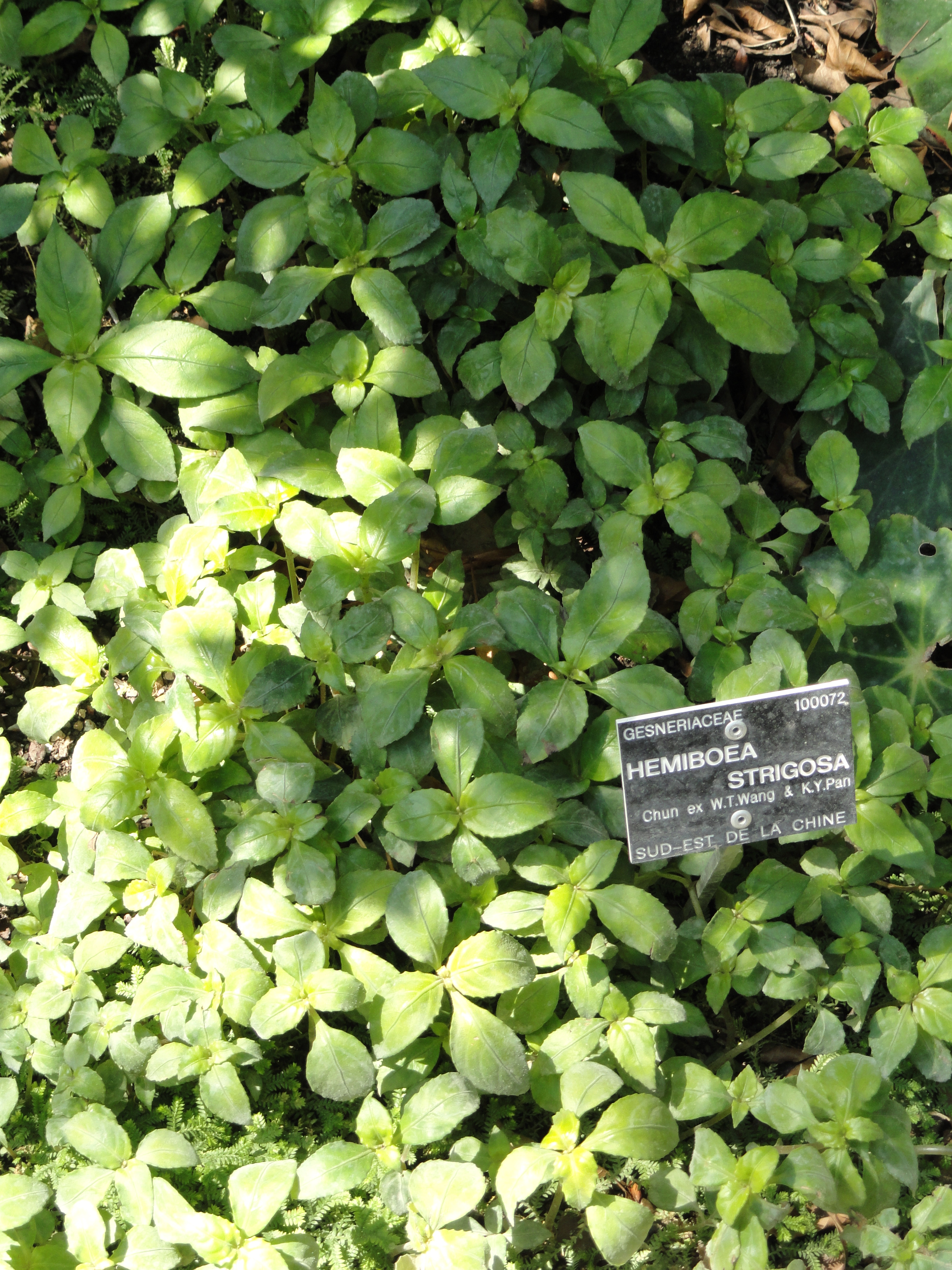
Hemiboea strigosa

Hemiboea is a genus of flowering plants belonging to the family Gesneriaceae.

Its native range is from Eastern Himalayas to Nansei-shoto (the Ryukyu Islands) and Vietnam. It is found in the regions of China, East Himalayas, Nansei-shoto, Taiwan and Vietnam.

The genus name of Hemiboea is in honour of François Beau (1723–1804), a clergyman. It was first described and published in Hooker's Icon. Pl. Vol.18: on table 1798 in 1888.

== Species ==
According to Kew:

- Hemiboea albiflora X.G.Xiang, Z.Y.Guo & Z.W.Wu
- Hemiboea angustifolia F.Wen & Y.G.Wei
- Hemiboea bicornuta (Hayata) Ohwi
- Hemiboea cavaleriei H.Lév.
- Hemiboea crystallina Y.M.Shui & W.H.Chen
- Hemiboea fangii Chun ex Z.Y.Li
- Hemiboea flaccida Chun ex Z.Y.Li
- Hemiboea follicularis C.B.Clarke
- Hemiboea gamosepala Z.Y.Li
- Hemiboea glandulosa Z.Y.Li
- Hemiboea gracilis Franch.
- Hemiboea integra C.Y.Wu ex H.W.Li
- Hemiboea latisepala H.W.Li
- Hemiboea longgangensis Z.Y.Li
- Hemiboea longisepala Z.Y.Li
- Hemiboea longzhouensis W.T.Wang
- Hemiboea lutea F.Wen, G.Y.Liang & Y.G.Wei
- Hemiboea magnibracteata Y.G.Wei & H.Q.Wen
- Hemiboea malipoensis Y.H.Tan
- Hemiboea mollifolia W.T.Wang
- Hemiboea omeiensis W.T.Wang
- Hemiboea ovalifolia (W.T.Wang) A.Weber & Mich.Möller
- Hemiboea parvibracteata W.T.Wang & Z.Yu Li
- Hemiboea parviflora Z.Y.Li
- Hemiboea pingbianensis Z.Y.Li
- Hemiboea pseudomagnibracteata B.Pan & W.H.Wu
- Hemiboea pterocaulis (Z.Yu Li) Jie Huang, X.G.Xiang & Q.Zhang
- Hemiboea purpurea Yan Liu & W.B.Xu
- Hemiboea purpureotincta (W.T.Wang) A.Weber & Mich.Möller
- Hemiboea roseoalba S.B.Zhou, Xin Hong & F.Wen
- Hemiboea rubribracteata Z.Yu Li & Yan Liu
- Hemiboea sinovietnamica W.B.Xu & X.Y.Zhuang
- Hemiboea strigosa Chun ex W.T.Wang & K.Y.Pan
- Hemiboea subacaulis Hand.-Mazz.
- Hemiboea subcapitata C.B.Clarke
- Hemiboea suiyangensis Z.Y.Li, S.W.Li & X.G.Xiang
- Hemiboea thanhhoensis C.H.Nguyen, Aver. & F.Wen
- Hemiboea wangiana Z.Yu Li
