= Orchadocarpa =

Scientific classification
- Kingdom: Plantae
- Clade: Tracheophytes
- Clade: Angiosperms
- Clade: Eudicots
- Clade: Asterids
- Order: Lamiales
- Family: Gesneriaceae
- Genus: Orchadocarpa; Ridl. (1905)
- Species: O. lilacina

Binomial name
- Orchadocarpa lilacina Ridl. (1905)

Genus of plants

Orchadocarpa is a genus of flowering plants belonging to the family Gesneriaceae. It contains a single species, Orchadocarpa lilacina, a lithophyte native to the Titiwangsa Range on the Malay Peninsula.
