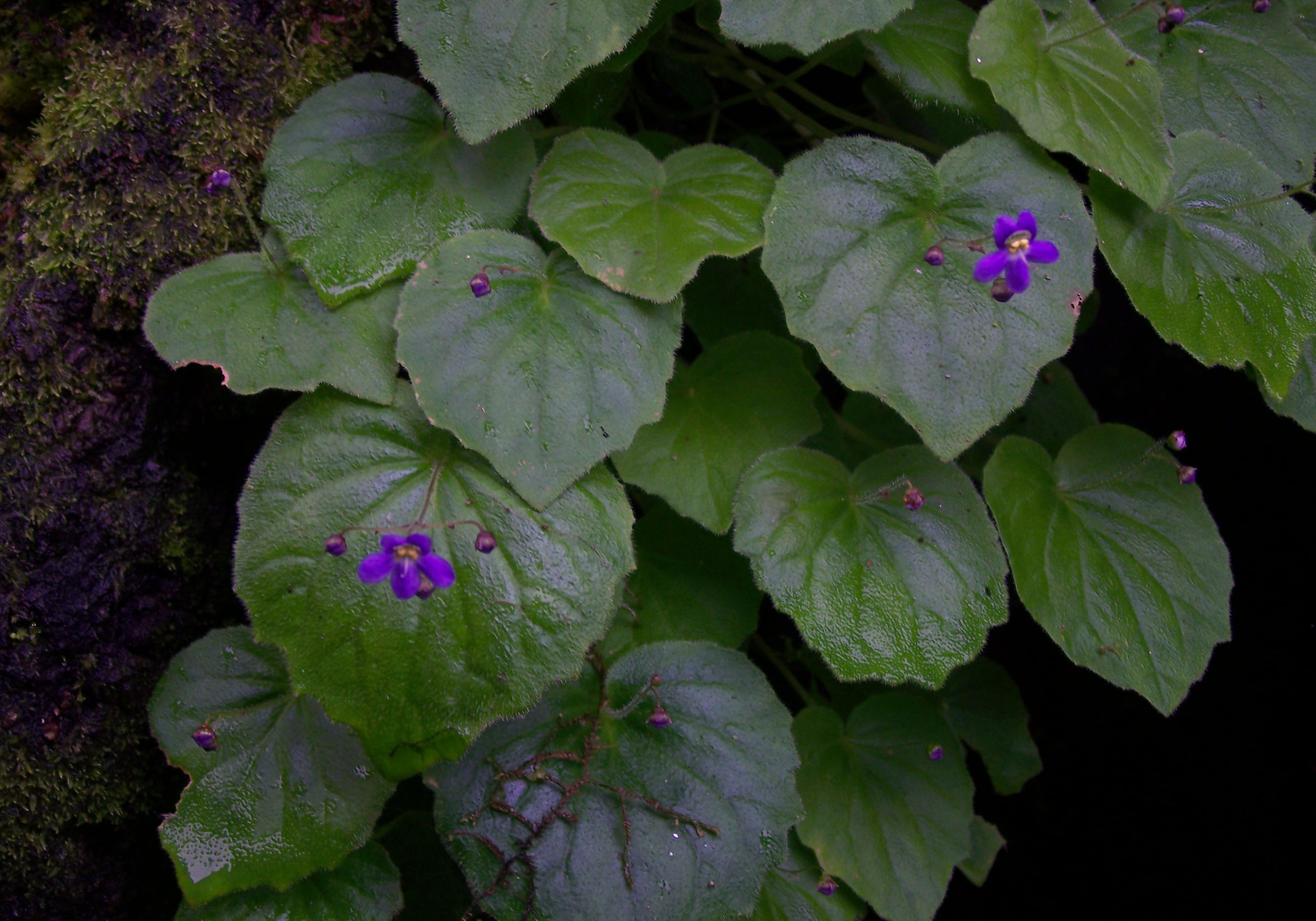
- Platystemma violoides

Scientific classification
- Kingdom: Plantae
- Clade: Tracheophytes
- Clade: Angiosperms
- Clade: Eudicots
- Clade: Asterids
- Order: Lamiales
- Family: Gesneriaceae
- Genus: Platystemma; Wall. (1831)
- Species: P. violoides

Binomial name
- Platystemma violoides Wall. (1831)

Synonyms
- Chirita violoides (Wall.) M.R.Almeida (2001); Didymocarpus hamosa Wall. (1829), not validly publ.; Platystemma majus Wall. (1831); Roettlera hamosa (Wall.) Kuntze (1891), not validly publ.; Rottlera hamosa Baill. (1894)

= Platystemma =

Genus of plants

Platystemma is a genus of flowering plants belonging to the family Gesneriaceae.

It contains a single species, Platystemma violoides, an annual native to the Indian subcontinent, Indochina, south-central China (Yunnan), and Peninsular Malaysia.
