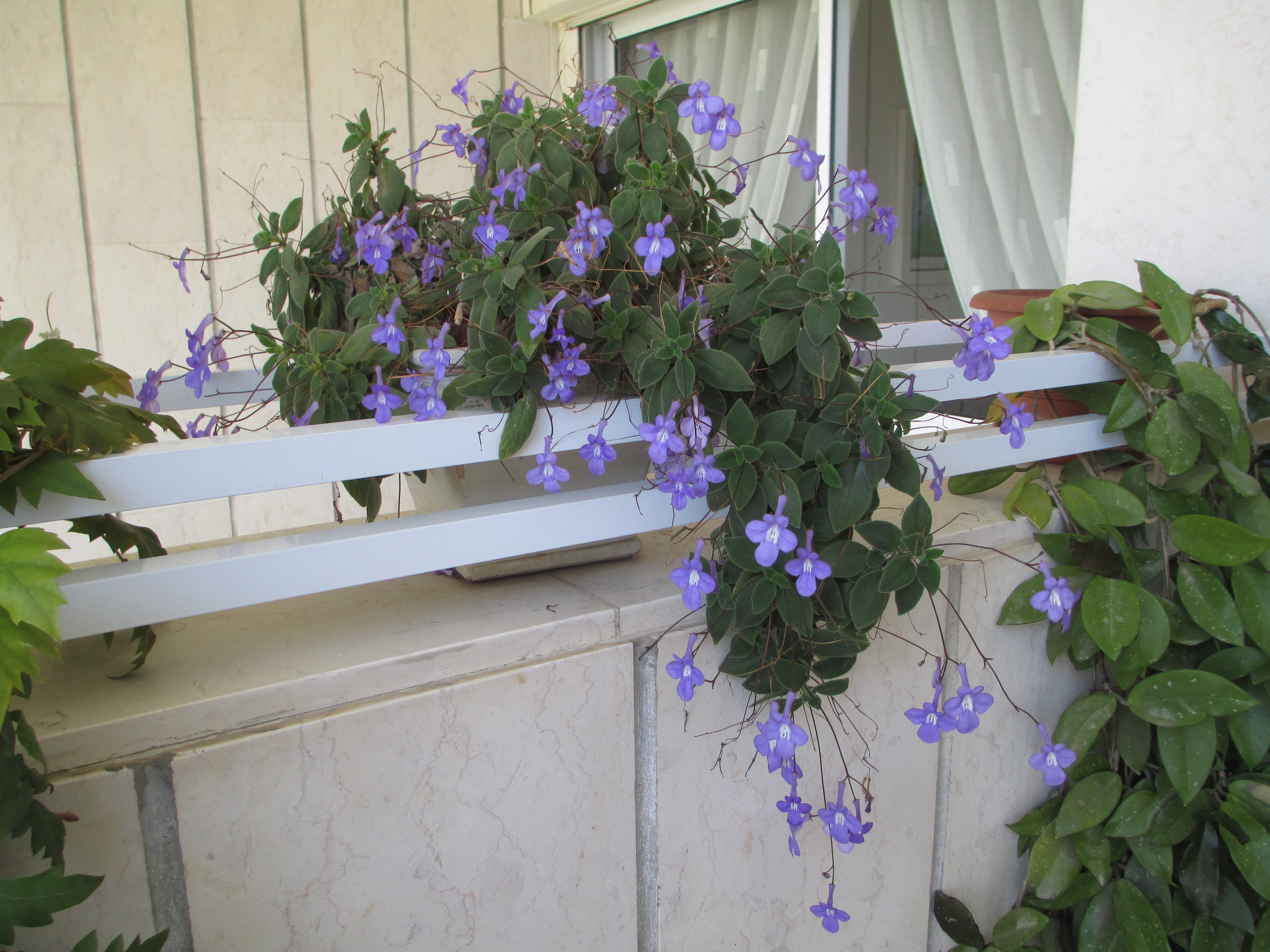
- Habit
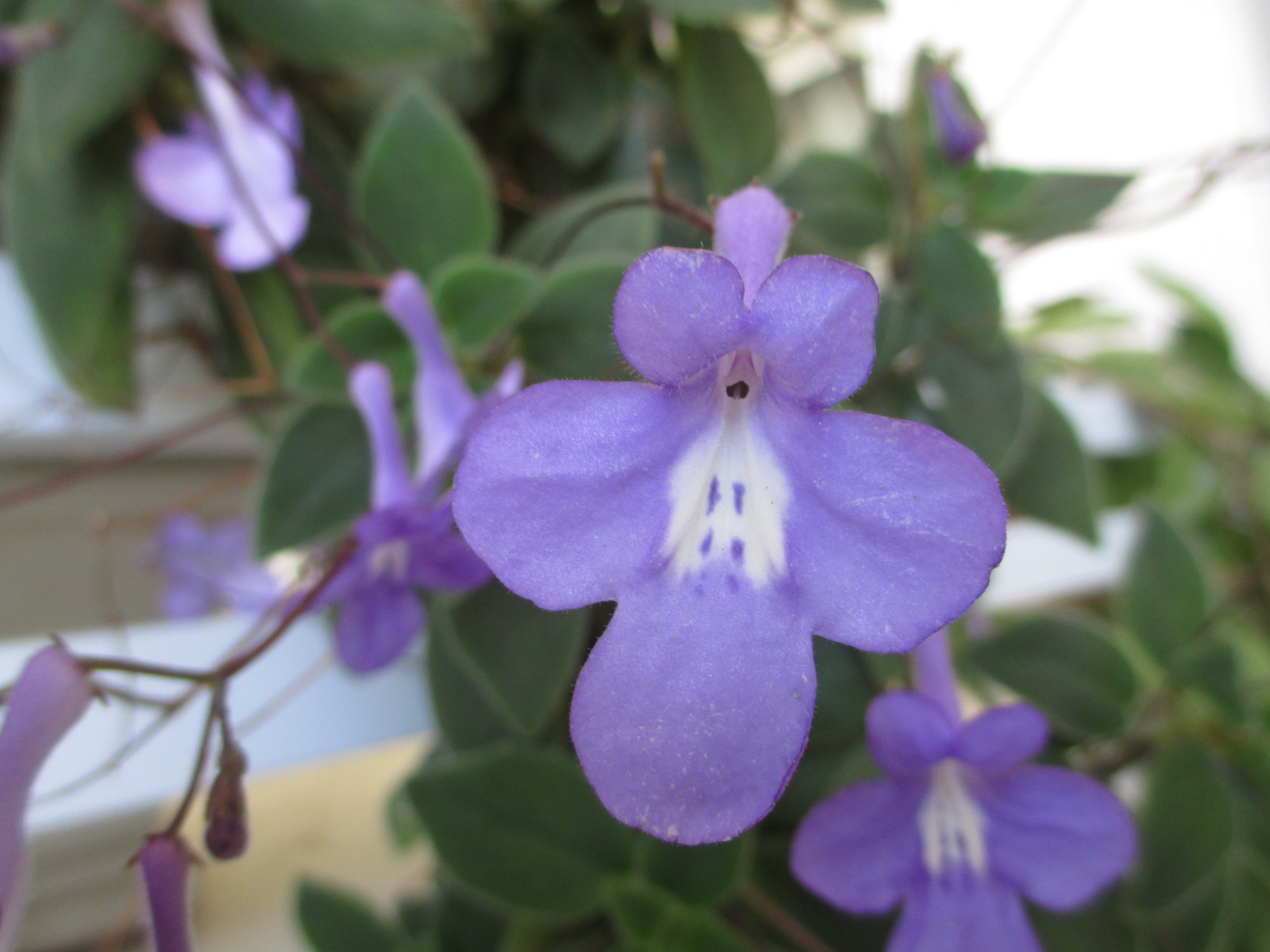
- Close-up of flower

Conservation status
- Least Concern (IUCN 3.1)

Scientific classification
- Kingdom: Plantae
- Clade: Embryophytes
- Clade: Tracheophytes
- Clade: Spermatophytes
- Clade: Angiosperms
- Clade: Eudicots
- Clade: Asterids
- Order: Lamiales
- Family: Gesneriaceae
- Genus: Streptocarpus
- Subgenus: S. subg. Streptocarpella
- Species: S. saxorum

Binomial name
- Streptocarpus saxorum Engl.

= Streptocarpus saxorum =

Species of flowering plant

Streptocarpus saxorum, called the false African violet, is a species of flowering plant in the genus Streptocarpus, subgenus Streptocarpella, native to Kenya and Tanzania. It is an evergreen perennial that often bears flowers nearly year-round. Its "compact" variety has gained the Royal Horticultural Society's Award of Garden Merit as a houseplant.
