= Rachunia =

Scientific classification
- Kingdom: Plantae
- Clade: Tracheophytes
- Clade: Angiosperms
- Clade: Eudicots
- Clade: Asterids
- Order: Lamiales
- Family: Gesneriaceae
- Genus: Rachunia; D.J.Middleton & C.Puglisi (2018)
- Species: R. cymbiformis

Binomial name
- Rachunia cymbiformis D.J.Middleton (2018)

Genus of plants

Rachunia is a genus of flowering plants belonging to the family Gesneriaceae.

It contains a single species, Rachunia cymbiformis, which is endemic to Thailand.
