= Raphiocarpus =

Scientific classification
- Kingdom: Plantae
- Clade: Tracheophytes
- Clade: Angiosperms
- Clade: Eudicots
- Clade: Asterids
- Order: Lamiales
- Family: Gesneriaceae
- Genus: Raphiocarpus; Chun (1946)

Genus of plants

Raphiocarpus is a genus of flowering plants belonging to the family Gesneriaceae.

Its native range is southern China, Hainan, and Vietnam.

== Species ==
18 species are accepted.

- Raphiocarpus annamensis (Pellegr.) B.L.Burtt
- Raphiocarpus asper (Drake) B.L.Burtt
- Raphiocarpus aureus (Dunn) B.L.Burtt
- Raphiocarpus axillaris D.J.Middleton
- Raphiocarpus begoniifolius (H.Lév.) B.L.Burtt
- Raphiocarpus bicallosus C.H.Nguyen, Aver. & F.Wen
- Raphiocarpus clemensiae (Pellegr.) B.L.Burtt
- Raphiocarpus evrardii (Pellegr.) B.L.Burtt
- Raphiocarpus jinpingensis W.H.Chen & Y.M.Shui
- Raphiocarpus longipedunculatus (C.Y.Wu ex H.W.Li) B.L.Burtt
- Raphiocarpus macrosiphon (Hance) B.L.Burtt
- Raphiocarpus maguanensis Y.M.Shui & W.H.Chen
- Raphiocarpus petelotii (Pellegr.) B.L.Burtt
- Raphiocarpus sesquifolius (C.B.Clarke) B.L.Burtt
- Raphiocarpus sinicus Chun
- Raphiocarpus sinovietnamicus Z.B.Xin, L.X.Yuan & T.V.Do
- Raphiocarpus tamdaoensis Phuong, Xuyen & Y.G.Wei
- Raphiocarpus taygiangensis C.H.Nguyen, K.S.Nguyen & Aver.
