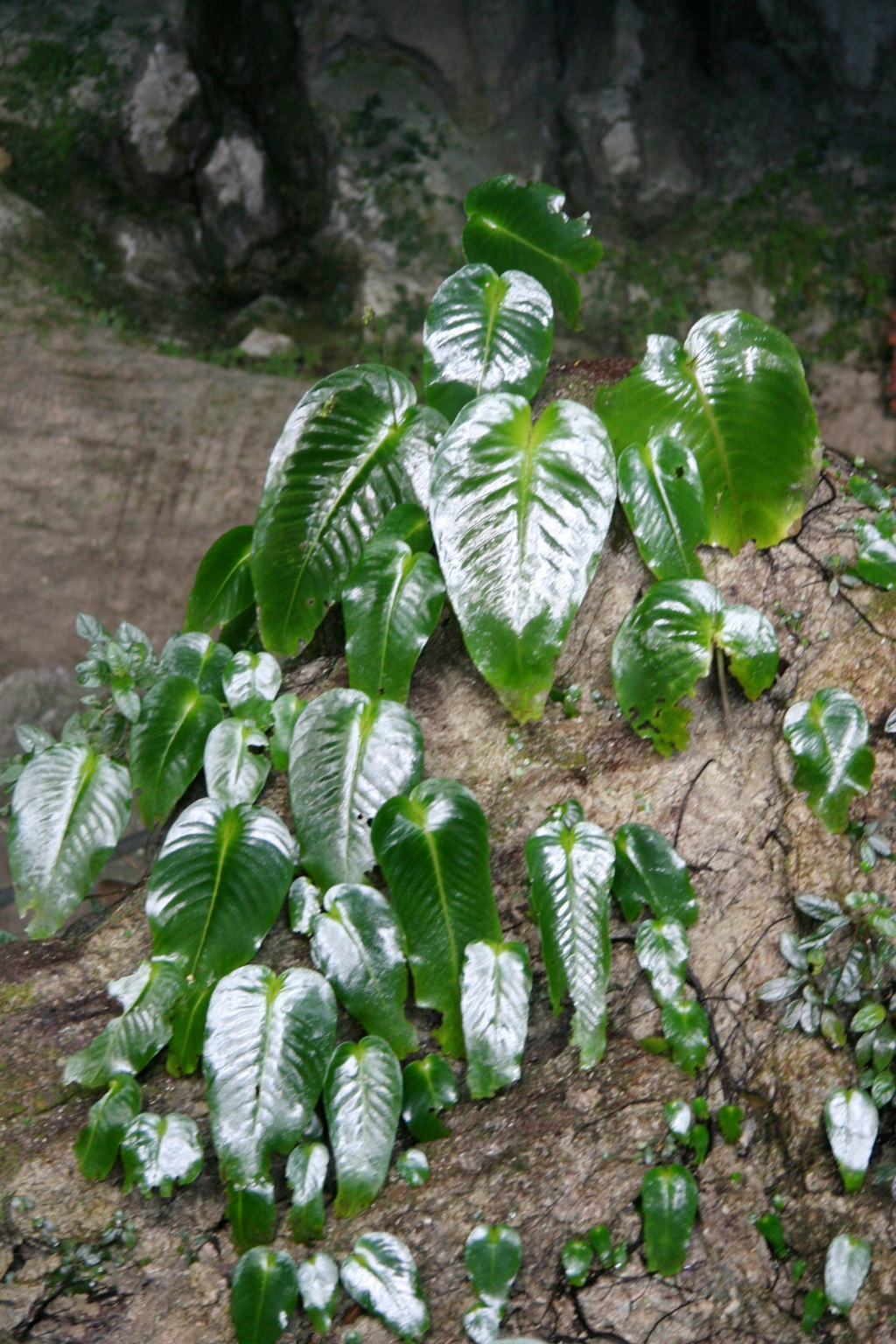
- Monophyllaea glauca (one-leaf plant) in a cave in Sarawak province on Borneo, Malaysia

Scientific classification
- Kingdom: Plantae
- Clade: Tracheophytes
- Clade: Angiosperms
- Clade: Eudicots
- Clade: Asterids
- Order: Lamiales
- Family: Gesneriaceae
- Genus: Monophyllaea
- Species: M. glauca

Binomial name
- Monophyllaea glauca (C.B. Clarke)

= Monophyllaea glauca =

Species of flowering plant

Monophyllaea glauca are plants that consist of just one leaf. They are endemic to Sarawak, Borneo, Malaysia.

== Distribution ==
Found only in Sarawak, Borneo, Malaysia.
