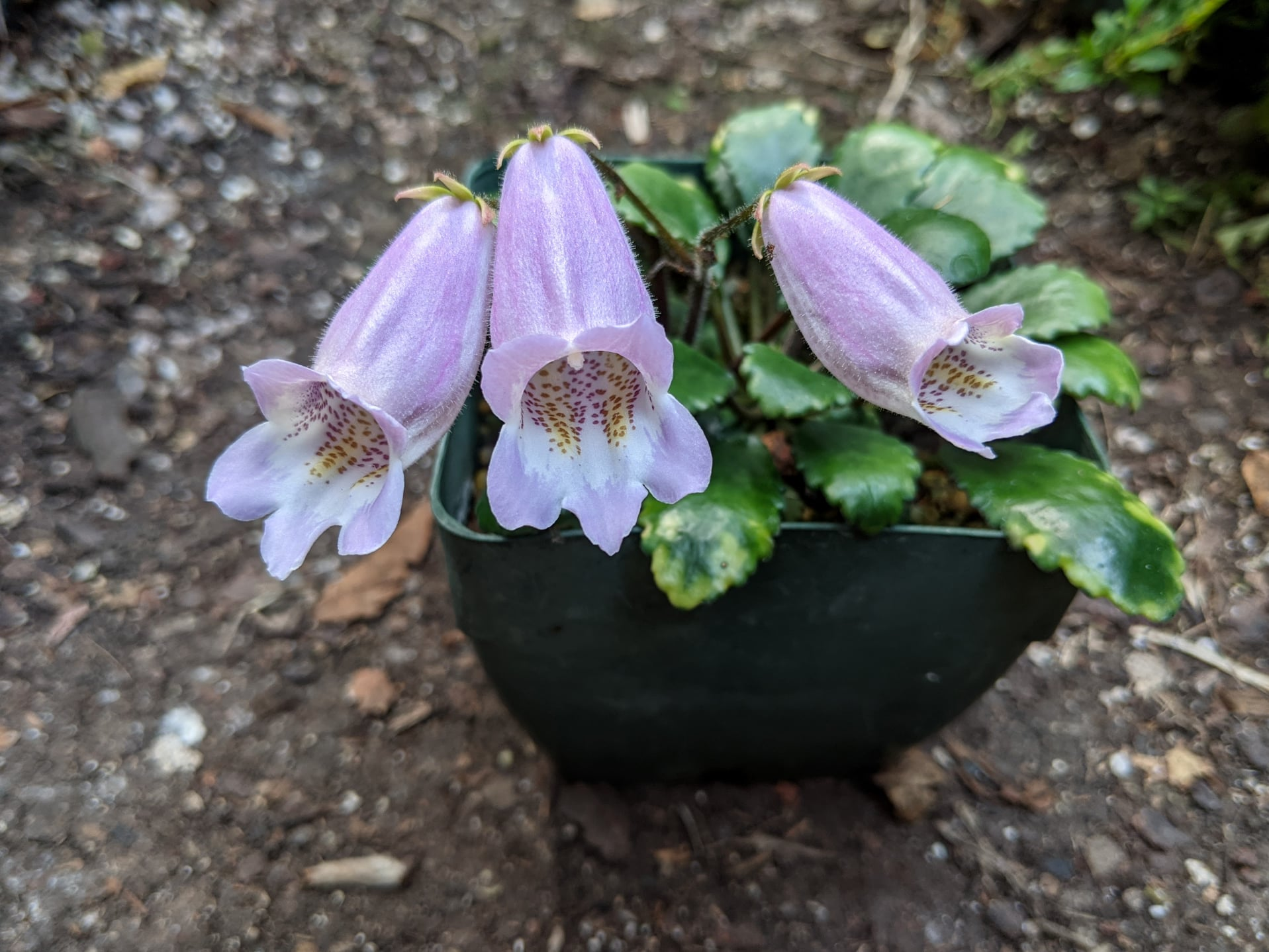
- Glabrella mihieri grown in cultivation

Scientific classification
- Kingdom: Plantae
- Clade: Tracheophytes
- Clade: Angiosperms
- Clade: Eudicots
- Clade: Asterids
- Order: Lamiales
- Family: Gesneriaceae
- Genus: Glabrella; Mich.Möller & W.H.Chen (2014)

= Glabrella =

Genus of plants

Glabrella is a genus of flowering plants belonging to the family Gesneriaceae.

Its native range is southern China.

Species:

- Glabrella bogaoi (S.W.Li & Yan Liu
- Glabrella leiophylla (F.Wen & Y.G.Wei) F.Wen, Y.G.Wei & Mich.Möller
- Glabrella longipes (Hemsl.) Mich.Möller & W.H.Chen
- Glabrella mihieri (Franch.) Mich.Möller & W.H.Chen
