= Championia =

Scientific classification
- Kingdom: Plantae
- Clade: Tracheophytes
- Clade: Angiosperms
- Clade: Eudicots
- Clade: Asterids
- Order: Lamiales
- Family: Gesneriaceae
- Genus: Championia; Gardner (1846)
- Species: C. reticulata

Binomial name
- Championia reticulata Gardner (1846)

Genus of flowering plants

Championia is a genus of flowering plants belonging to the family Gesneriaceae. It contains a single species, Championia reticulata, a subshrub native to the humid lowland and montane rain forests of southwestern and central Sri Lanka.

The species was described by George Gardner in 1846.
