= Briggsiopsis =

Scientific classification
- Kingdom: Plantae
- Clade: Tracheophytes
- Clade: Angiosperms
- Clade: Eudicots
- Clade: Asterids
- Order: Lamiales
- Family: Gesneriaceae
- Genus: Briggsiopsis; K.Y.Pan (1985)
- Species: B. delavayi

Binomial name
- Briggsiopsis delavayi (Franch.) K.Y.Pan (1985)

Synonyms
- Briggsia beauverdiana (H.Lév.) Craib (1919); Briggsia delavayi (Franch.) Chun (1946); Didissandra beauverdiana H.Lév. (1911); Didissandra delavayi Franch. (1899)

Genus of flowering plants

Briggsiopsis is a monotypic genus of flowering plants belonging to the family Gesneriaceae. It contains only one known species, Briggsiopsis delavayi.

It is a perennial native to southern Sichuan, northeastern Yunnan, and Guizhou in south-central China.

The species was first described as Didissandra delavayi by Adrien René Franchet in 1899. In 1985 Kai Yu Pan placed it in a new monotypic genus as Briggsiopsis delavayi. The genus is named in honour of Munro Briggs Scott (1889–1917), a Scottish botanist and British officer who was killed in the First World War
