= Hexatheca =

Scientific classification
- Kingdom: Plantae
- Clade: Tracheophytes
- Clade: Angiosperms
- Clade: Eudicots
- Clade: Asterids
- Order: Lamiales
- Family: Gesneriaceae
- Genus: Hexatheca; C.B.Clarke (1883)

Genus of plants

Hexatheca is a genus of flowering plants belonging to the family Gesneriaceae.

Its native range is Borneo.

Four species are accepted:

- Hexatheca dolichopoda B.L.Burtt
- Hexatheca fulva C.B.Clarke
- Hexatheca johannis-winkleri Kraenzl.
- Hexatheca longipedunculata S.Julia & Kiew
