= Chayamaritia =

Scientific classification
- Kingdom: Plantae
- Clade: Tracheophytes
- Clade: Angiosperms
- Clade: Eudicots
- Clade: Asterids
- Order: Lamiales
- Family: Gesneriaceae
- Genus: Chayamaritia; D.J.Middleton & Mich.Möller (2015)

Genus of flowering plants

Chayamaritia is a genus of flowering plants belonging to the family Gesneriaceae.

Its native range is Indo-China.

Species:

- Chayamaritia banksiae D.J.Middleton
- Chayamaritia smitinandii (B.L.Burtt) D.J.Middleton
- Chayamaritia sirindhorniana D.J.Middleton, Tetsana & Suddee
- Chayamaritia vietnamensis F.Wen, T.V.Do, Z.B.Xin & S.Maciej.; Vietnam
