= Billolivia =

Scientific classification
- Kingdom: Plantae
- Clade: Embryophytes
- Clade: Tracheophytes
- Clade: Spermatophytes
- Clade: Angiosperms
- Clade: Eudicots
- Clade: Asterids
- Order: Lamiales
- Family: Gesneriaceae
- Genus: Billolivia; D.J.Middleton

Genus of flowering plants

Billolivia is a genus of flowering plants belonging to the family Gesneriaceae.

Its native range is Vietnam.

Species:

- Billolivia cadamensis Q.D.Nguyen, N.L.Vu & Luu
- Billolivia citrina Luu, H.Ð.Tr?n & N.L.Vu
- Billolivia kyi Luu & G.Tran
- Billolivia longipetiolata D.J.Middleton & Luu
- Billolivia middletonii N.S.Lý
- Billolivia minutiflora D.J.Middleton & H.J.Atkins
- Billolivia moelleri D.J.Middleton
- Billolivia noanii Luu, N.L.Vu & H.N.Pham
- Billolivia poilanei D.J.Middleton & H.J.Atkins
- Billolivia tichii Luu, Q.D.Nguyen & N.L.Vu
- Billolivia truciae Luu & Q.D.Nguyen
- Billolivia vietnamensis D.J.Middleton & Luu
- Billolivia violacea D.J.Middleton & H.J.Atkins
- Billolivia yenhoae Luu
