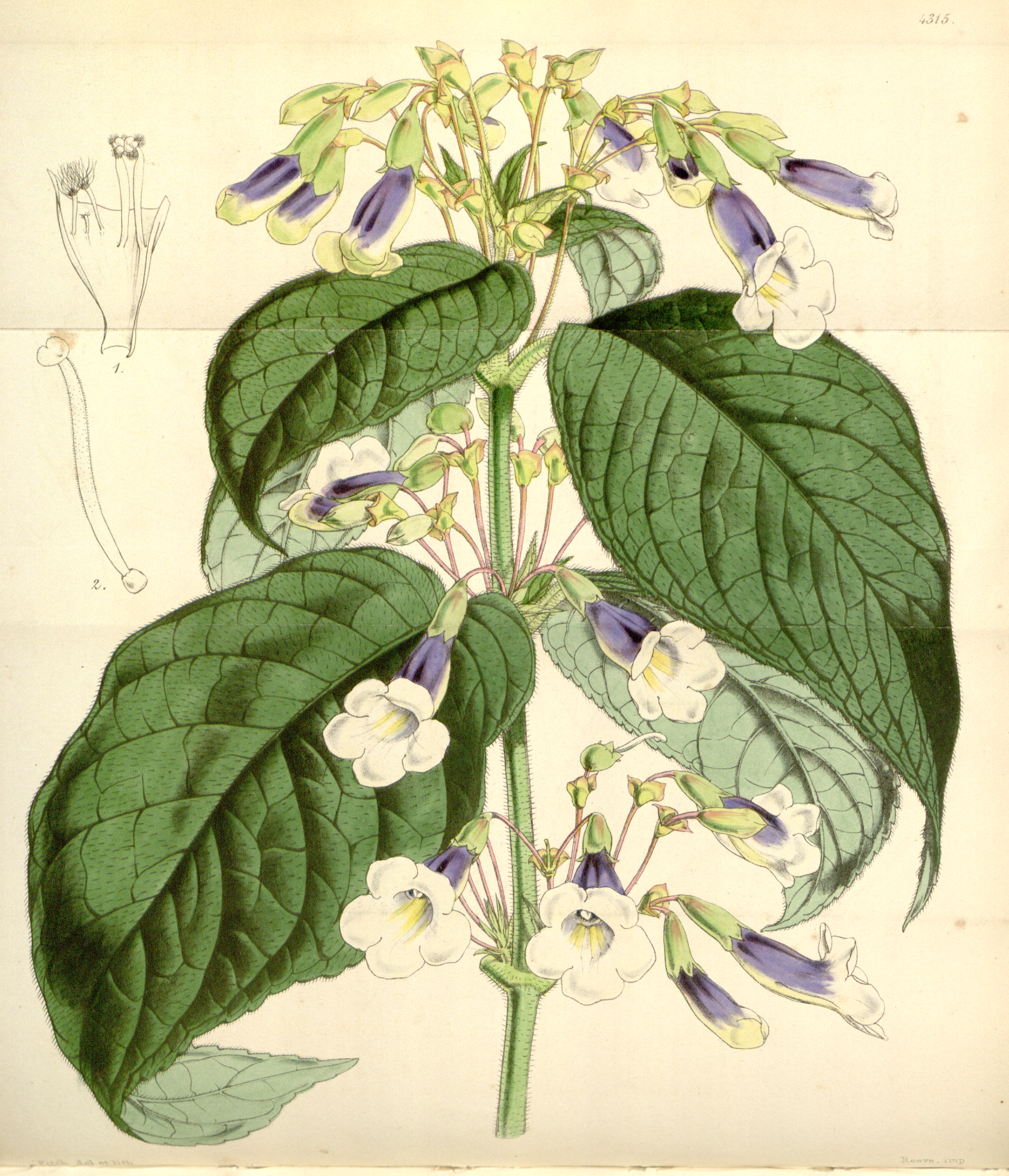
- Liebigia barbata

Scientific classification
- Kingdom: Plantae
- Clade: Tracheophytes
- Clade: Angiosperms
- Clade: Eudicots
- Clade: Asterids
- Order: Lamiales
- Family: Gesneriaceae
- Genus: Liebigia; Endl.

Synonyms
- Morstdorffia Steud.; Tromsdorffia Blume; Bilabium Miq.; Hypopteron Hassk.

= Liebigia =

Genus of plants

Liebigia is a genus of flowering plants belonging to the family Gesneriaceae.

It is native to Java, Sumatera and Lesser Sunda Islands.

The genus name of Liebigia is in honour of Justus von Liebig (1803–1873), a German scientist who made major contributions to agricultural and biological chemistry, and is considered one of the principal founders of organic chemistry. It was first described and published in Gen. Pl. on page 1407 in 1841.

== Known species ==
According to Kew:

- Liebigia adenonema (Hilliard) Mich.Möller & A.Weber
- Liebigia barbata (Jack) D.J.Middleton
- Liebigia dissimilis (Hilliard) Mich.Möller & A.Weber
- Liebigia glabra (Miq.) Mich.Möller & A.Weber
- Liebigia horsfieldii (R.Br.) Mich.Möller & A.Weber
- Liebigia leuserensis (Hilliard) Mich.Möller & A.Weber
- Liebigia limans (Miq.) Mich.Möller & A.Weber
- Liebigia neoforbesii (Hilliard) Mich.Möller & A.Weber
- Liebigia polyneura (Miq.) Mich.Möller & A.Weber
- Liebigia praeterita (Hilliard) Mich.Möller & A.Weber
- Liebigia tenuipes (Hilliard) Mich.Möller & A.Weber
- Liebigia tobaensis (Hilliard) Mich.Möller & A.Weber
