= Boeica =

Scientific classification
- Kingdom: Plantae
- Clade: Tracheophytes
- Clade: Angiosperms
- Clade: Eudicots
- Clade: Asterids
- Order: Lamiales
- Family: Gesneriaceae
- Genus: Boeica; C.B.Clarke (1874)

Synonyms
- Boeicopsis H.W.Li (1982)

Genus of flowering plants

Boeica is a genus of flowering plants belonging to the family Gesneriaceae. Its native range is Tropical Asia, ranging from the eastern Himalayas to Indochina, southern China, and Peninsular Malaysia.

== Species ==
16 species are accepted.

- Boeica arunachalensis D.Borah, R.Kr.Singh, Taram & A.P.Das
- Boeica brachyandra Ridl.
- Boeica clarkei Hareesh, L.Wu, A.Joe & M.Sabu
- Boeica ferruginea Drake
- Boeica filiformis C.B.Clarke
- Boeica fulva C.B.Clarke
- Boeica glandulosa B.L.Burtt
- Boeica griffithii C.B.Clarke
- Boeica guileana B.L.Burtt
- Boeica hirsuta C.B.Clarke
- Boeica konchurangensis B.H.Quang, D.V.Hai & Mich.Möller
- Boeica multinervia K.Y.Pan
- Boeica nutans Ridl.
- Boeica ornithocephalantha F.Wen, T.V.Do & Y.G.Wei
- Boeica porosa C.B.Clarke
- Boeica stolonifera K.Y.Pan
- Boeica yunnanensis (H.W.Li) K.Y.Pan
