= Munro Briggs Scott =

Scottish botanist

- Born: 29 April 1889; East Wemyss, Fifeshire, Scotland
- Died: 12 April 1917 (aged 27) near Arras, France
- Scientific career
- Fields: Botany
- Author abbrev. (botany): M.B.Scott

Munro Briggs Scott (29 April 1889 – 12 April 1917) was a Scottish botanist and British officer killed in WW I.

After education at Buckhaven High School, Scott graduated from the University of Edinburgh with MA and BSc. He was an assistant botanist at Kew Gardens Herbarium from 1914 to 1916. In February 1916 he joined Kew's local regiment, the East Surrey Regiment, with the rank of private. He became a lance corporal in the Suffolk Regiment and became a second lieutenant in the 12th Battalion Royal Scots. He married Flora M. Forbes in November 1916. Scott was posted to France in January 1917 and killed in April 1917 at the Battle of Arras.

== Eponyms ==
- Former genus, Briggsia, Craib (W. G. Craib was a colleague and friend of Scott at Kew.)
- Briggsiopsis (the family Gesneriaceae) published in 1985.
