= Sepikea =

Scientific classification
- Kingdom: Plantae
- Clade: Tracheophytes
- Clade: Angiosperms
- Clade: Eudicots
- Clade: Asterids
- Order: Lamiales
- Family: Gesneriaceae
- Genus: Sepikea; Schltr. (1923)
- Species: S. cylindrocarpa

Binomial name
- Sepikea cylindrocarpa Schltr. (1923)

Genus of plants

Sepikea is a genus of flowering plants belonging to the family Gesneriaceae.

It contains a single species, Sepikea cylindrocarpa, a subshrub endemic to New Guinea.
