= Beccarinda =

Scientific classification
- Kingdom: Plantae
- Clade: Tracheophytes
- Clade: Angiosperms
- Clade: Eudicots
- Clade: Asterids
- Order: Lamiales
- Family: Gesneriaceae
- Genus: Beccarinda; Kuntze

Genus of flowering plants

Beccarinda is a genus of flowering plants belonging to the family Gesneriaceae.

Its native range is Indo-China, Southern China.

Species:

- Beccarinda argentea (J.Anthony) B.L.Burtt
- Beccarinda cordifolia (J.Anthony) B.L.Burtt
- Beccarinda erythrotricha W.T.Wang
- Beccarinda griffithii (C.B.Clarke) Kuntze
- Beccarinda minima K.Y.Pan
- Beccarinda paucisetulosa C.Y.Wu ex H.W.Li
- Beccarinda sinensis (Chun) B.L.Burtt
- Beccarinda sumatrana B.L.Burtt
- Beccarinda tonkinensis (Pellegr.) B.L.Burtt
