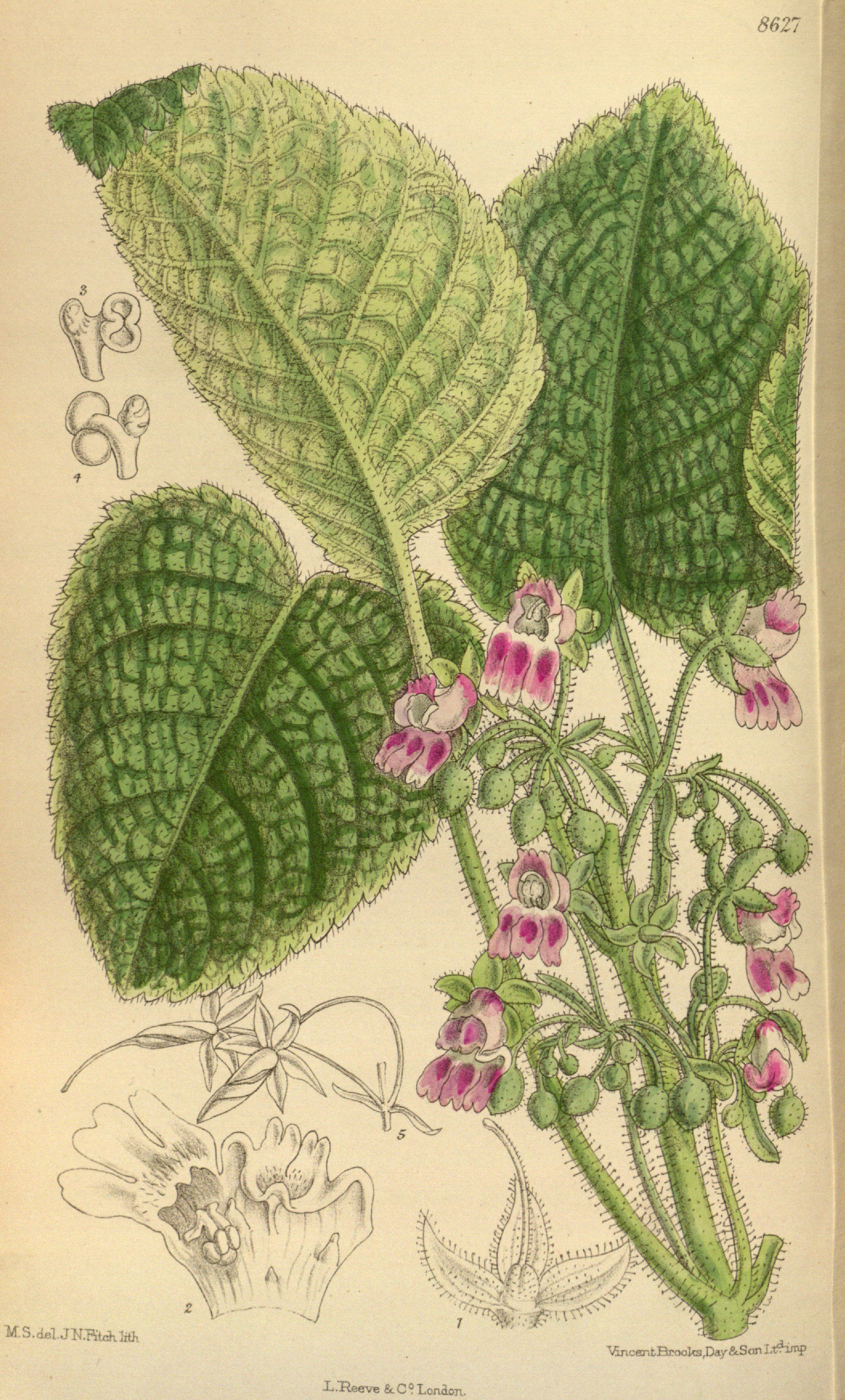
- Ornithoboea lacei

Scientific classification
- Kingdom: Plantae
- Clade: Tracheophytes
- Clade: Angiosperms
- Clade: Eudicots
- Clade: Asterids
- Order: Lamiales
- Family: Gesneriaceae
- Genus: Ornithoboea; C.S.P.Parish ex C.B.Clarke (1883)

Synonyms
- Brachiostemon Hand.-Mazz. (1934); Lepadanthus Ridl. (1909); Sinoboea Chun (1946)

= Ornithoboea =

Genus of plants

Ornithoboea is a genus of flowering plants belonging to the family Gesneriaceae. It includes 17 species native to south-central China, Indochina, and Peninsular Malaysia.

== Species ==
17 species are accepted.

- Ornithoboea arachnoidea (Diels) Craib
- Ornithoboea barbanthera B.L.Burtt
- Ornithoboea calcicola C.Y.Wu ex H.W.Li
- Ornithoboea emarginata D.J.Middleton & N.S.Ly
- Ornithoboea feddei (H.Lév.) B.L.Burtt
- Ornithoboea flexuosa (Ridl.) B.L.Burtt
- Ornithoboea grandiflora D.J.Middleton
- Ornithoboea henryi Craib
- Ornithoboea lacei Craib
- Ornithoboea maxwellii S.M.Scott
- Ornithoboea multitorta B.L.Burtt
- Ornithoboea obovata S.M.Scott
- Ornithoboea occulta B.L.Burtt
- Ornithoboea parishii C.B.Clarke
- Ornithoboea pseudoflexuosa B.L.Burtt
- Ornithoboea puglisiae S.M.Scott
- Ornithoboea wildeana Craib
