= Cathayanthe =

Scientific classification
- Kingdom: Plantae
- Clade: Tracheophytes
- Clade: Angiosperms
- Clade: Eudicots
- Clade: Asterids
- Order: Lamiales
- Family: Gesneriaceae
- Genus: Cathayanthe; Chun (1946)
- Species: C. biflora

Binomial name
- Cathayanthe biflora Chun (1946)

Genus of flowering plants

Cathayanthe biflora is a species of flowering plant belonging to the family Gesneriaceae. It is a perennial or rhizomatous geophyte native to Hainan and northern Vietnam. It is the sole species in genus Cathayanthe.
