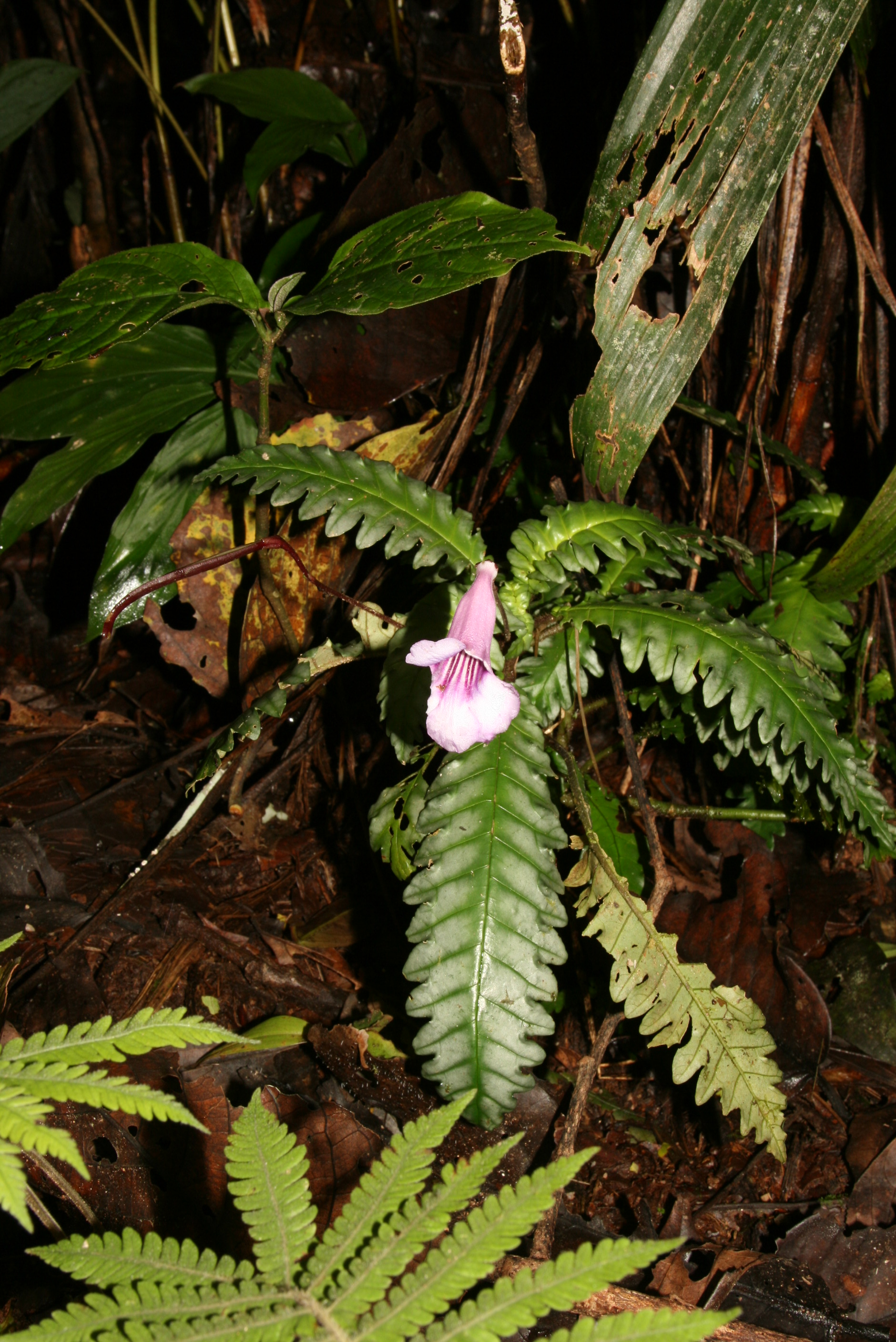
- Ridleyandra morganii

Scientific classification
- Kingdom: Plantae
- Clade: Tracheophytes
- Clade: Angiosperms
- Clade: Eudicots
- Clade: Asterids
- Order: Lamiales
- Family: Gesneriaceae
- Genus: Ridleyandra; A.Weber & B.L.Burtt

= Ridleyandra =

Genus of flowering plants

Ridleyandra is a genus of flowering plants belonging to the family Gesneriaceae.

Its native range is Thailand to western Malesia. It is found in Borneo, Malaya and Thailand.

The genus name of Ridleyandra is in honour of Henry Nicholas Ridley (1855–1956), an English botanist, geologist and naturalist who lived much of his life in Singapore. He was instrumental in promoting rubber trees in the Malay Peninsula. It was first described and published in Beitr. Biol. Pflanzen Vol.70 on page 171 (written in 1997–1998) publ. 1998.

== Known species ==
According to Kew;

- Ridleyandra atrocyanea (Ridl.) A.Weber
- Ridleyandra atropurpurea (Ridl.) A.Weber
- Ridleyandra bintangensis Kiew
- Ridleyandra castaneifolia (Ridl.) A.Weber
- Ridleyandra chuana Kiew
- Ridleyandra corneri A.Weber
- Ridleyandra flammea (Ridl.) A.Weber
- Ridleyandra glabrescens (Ridl.) A.Weber
- Ridleyandra iminii Siti-Munirah
- Ridleyandra kelantanensis Kiew
- Ridleyandra kerrii A.Weber
- Ridleyandra kiewii (Kiew) A.Weber
- Ridleyandra latisepala (Ridl.) A.Weber
- Ridleyandra longisepala (Ridl.) A.Weber
- Ridleyandra merohmerea Siti-Munirah & D.Zaharil
- Ridleyandra morganii (Franch.) A.Weber
- Ridleyandra natunae B.L.Burtt
- Ridleyandra nuangensis Kiew
- Ridleyandra ornata (C.B.Clarke) B.L.Burtt
- Ridleyandra padangensis Kiew
- Ridleyandra petiolata (Ridl.) A.Weber
- Ridleyandra porphyrantha (A.Weber & Kiew) A.Weber
- Ridleyandra quercifolia (Ridl.) A.Weber
- Ridleyandra rufa (C.B.Clarke) B.L.Burtt
- Ridleyandra serratifolia (Ridl.) A.Weber
- Ridleyandra stellata A.Weber
- Ridleyandra synaptica (B.L.Burtt) B.L.Burtt
- Ridleyandra tenella (B.L.Burtt) B.L.Burtt
- Ridleyandra violacea (Ridl.) A.Weber
- Ridleyandra wrayi (Ridl.) A.Weber
