= Litostigma =

Scientific classification
- Kingdom: Plantae
- Clade: Tracheophytes
- Clade: Angiosperms
- Clade: Eudicots
- Clade: Asterids
- Order: Lamiales
- Family: Gesneriaceae
- Genus: Litostigma; Y.G.Wei, F.Wen & Mich.Möller (2010)

Genus of plants

Litostigma is a genus of flowering plants belonging to the family Gesneriaceae.

Its native range is southern China and northern Vietnam.

Species:

- Litostigma coriaceifolium Y.G.Wei, F.Wen & Mich.Möller
- Litostigma crystallinum Y.M.Shui & W.H.Chen
- Litostigma napoense Y.Feng Huang, B.M.Wang & Y.S.Chen
- Litostigma pingbianense Y.S.Chen & B.M.Wang
