= Allostigma =

Scientific classification
- Kingdom: Plantae
- Clade: Tracheophytes
- Clade: Angiosperms
- Clade: Eudicots
- Clade: Asterids
- Order: Lamiales
- Family: Gesneriaceae
- Genus: Allostigma; W.T.Wang (1984)
- Species: A. guangxiense

Binomial name
- Allostigma guangxiense W.T.Wang (1984)

Genus of flowering plants

Allostigma is a genus of flowering plants belonging to the family Gesneriaceae. It contains a single species, Allostigma guangxiense, a shubshrub native to southwestern Guanxi province in southern China.
