= Rhabdothamnopsis =

Scientific classification
- Kingdom: Plantae
- Clade: Tracheophytes
- Clade: Angiosperms
- Clade: Eudicots
- Clade: Asterids
- Order: Lamiales
- Family: Gesneriaceae
- Genus: Rhabdothamnopsis; Hemsl. (1903)
- Species: R. sinensis

Binomial name
- Rhabdothamnopsis sinensis Hemsl. (1903)

Synonyms
- Boea cavaleriei H.Lév. & Vaniot (1906); Boea esquirolii H.Lév. & Vaniot (1906); Boea rubicunda H.Lév. (1915); Rhabdothamnopsis chinensis (Franch.) Hand.-Mazz. (1936), nom. illeg.; Rhabdothamnopsis chinensis var. ochroleuca (W.W.Sm.) Hand.-Mazz. (1936); Rhabdothamnopsis limprichtiana Lingelsh. & Borza (1914); Rhabdothamnopsis sinensis var. ochroleuca W.W.Sm. (1924); Streptocarpus chinensis Franch. (1899)

Genus of plants

Rhabdothamnopsis is a genus of flowering plants belonging to the family Gesneriaceae. It contains a single species, Rhabdothamnopsis sinensis, a subshrub native to western and southwestern Sichuan, northern and central Yunnan, and western Guizhou in south-central China.
