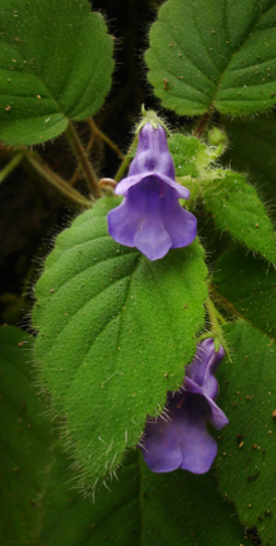

Scientific classification
- Kingdom: Plantae
- Clade: Tracheophytes
- Clade: Angiosperms
- Clade: Eudicots
- Clade: Asterids
- Order: Lamiales
- Family: Gesneriaceae
- Genus: Spelaeanthus; Kiew, A.Weber & B.L.Burtt (1997-1998 publ. 1998)

= Spelaeanthus =

Genus of plants

Spelaeanthus is a genus of flowering plants belonging to the family Gesneriaceae.

Its native range is Malaysian Peninsula and Vietnam.

== Species ==
Species:

- Spelaeanthus chinii Kiew, A.Weber & B.L.Burtt
- Spelaeanthus vietnamensis D.J.Middleton
