= Senyumia =

Scientific classification
- Kingdom: Plantae
- Clade: Tracheophytes
- Clade: Angiosperms
- Clade: Eudicots
- Clade: Asterids
- Order: Lamiales
- Family: Gesneriaceae
- Genus: Senyumia; Kiew, A.Weber & B.L.Burtt (1997-1998 publ. 1998)

Genus of plants

Senyumia is a genus of flowering plants belonging to the family Gesneriaceae.

It is endemic to Peninsular Malaysia.

== Species ==
Species:

- Senyumia granitica Kiew
- Senyumia minutiflora (Ridl.) Kiew, A.Weber & B.L.Burtt
