= Pseudochirita =

Scientific classification
- Kingdom: Plantae
- Clade: Tracheophytes
- Clade: Angiosperms
- Clade: Eudicots
- Clade: Asterids
- Order: Lamiales
- Family: Gesneriaceae
- Genus: Pseudochirita; W.T.Wang (1983)

Genus of plants

Pseudochirita is a genus of flowering plants belonging to the family Gesneriaceae. It includes two species native to southeastern China, Vietnam, and Laos.

== Species ==
Two species are accepted.

- Pseudochirita guangxiensis (S.Z.Huang) W.T.Wang
- Pseudochirita trifoliata T.V.Do & F.Wen
