= Michaelmoelleria =

Scientific classification
- Kingdom: Plantae
- Clade: Tracheophytes
- Clade: Angiosperms
- Clade: Eudicots
- Clade: Asterids
- Order: Lamiales
- Family: Gesneriaceae
- Genus: Michaelmoelleria; F.Wen, Y.G.Wei & T.V.Do (2020)
- Species: M. vietnamensis

Binomial name
- Michaelmoelleria vietnamensis F.Wen, Z.B.Xin & T.V.Do (2020)

Genus of flowering plants

Michaelmoelleria vietnamensis is a species of flowering plant in the family Gesneriaceae. It is the sole species in genus Michaelmoelleria. It is endemic to Vietnam.
