= Gyrocheilos =

Scientific classification
- Kingdom: Plantae
- Clade: Tracheophytes
- Clade: Angiosperms
- Clade: Eudicots
- Clade: Asterids
- Order: Lamiales
- Family: Gesneriaceae
- Genus: Gyrocheilos; W.T.Wang (1981)

Genus of plants

Gyrocheilos is a genus of flowering plants belonging to the family Gesneriaceae.

Its native range is southern China (Guangxi, Guangdong, SE Guizhou) and northern Vietnam.

Species:

- Gyrocheilos chorisepalus W.T.Wang
- Gyrocheilos lasiocalyx W.T.Wang
- Gyrocheilos microtrichus W.T.Wang
- Gyrocheilos orbiculatum D.J.Middleton; Vietnam
- Gyrocheilos retrotrichus W.T.Wang
- Gyrocheilos taishanense G.T.Wang, Yu Q.Chen & R.J.Wang
