= Leptoboea =

Scientific classification
- Kingdom: Plantae
- Clade: Tracheophytes
- Clade: Angiosperms
- Clade: Eudicots
- Clade: Asterids
- Order: Lamiales
- Family: Gesneriaceae
- Genus: Leptoboea; Benth.

Genus of plants

Leptoboea is a genus of flowering plants belonging to the family Gesneriaceae.

Its native range is Himalaya to Southern Central China and Indo-China.

Species:

- Leptoboea glabra C.B.Clarke
- Leptoboea multiflora (C.B.Clarke) Benth. ex Gamble
