= Somrania =

Scientific classification
- Kingdom: Plantae
- Clade: Tracheophytes
- Clade: Angiosperms
- Clade: Eudicots
- Clade: Asterids
- Order: Lamiales
- Family: Gesneriaceae
- Genus: Somrania; D.J.Middleton

Genus of plants

Somrania is a genus of flowering plants belonging to the family Gesneriaceae.

It is native to Thailand.

The genus name of Somrania is in honour of Somran Suddee (fl. 1998), a Thai plant collector and botanist who worked at the Forest Herbarium in Bangkok in Thailand. It was first described and published in Thai Forest Bull., Bot. Vol.40 on page 10 in 2012.

== Known species ==
According to Kew:

- Somrania albiflora D.J.Middleton
- Somrania flavida D.J.Middleton & Triboun
- Somrania lineata D.J.Middleton & Triboun
