= Loxostigma =

Scientific classification
- Kingdom: Plantae
- Clade: Tracheophytes
- Clade: Angiosperms
- Clade: Eudicots
- Clade: Asterids
- Order: Lamiales
- Family: Gesneriaceae
- Genus: Loxostigma; C.B.Clarke (1883)

Species
- 14; see text

Genus of plants

Loxostigma is a genus of flowering plants belonging to the family Gesneriaceae.

Its native range is the Himalaya to southern China and northern Indo-China (Myanmar and Vietnam).

== Species ==
14 species are accepted.

- Loxostigma brevipetiolatum W.T.Wang & K.Y.Pan
- Loxostigma cavaleriei (H.Lév. & Vaniot) B.L.Burtt
- Loxostigma damingshanense (L.Wu & B.Pan) Mich.Möller & H.Atkins
- Loxostigma dongxingensis (Chun ex K.Y.Pan) Mich.Möller & H.Atkins
- Loxostigma fimbrisepalum K.Y.Pan
- Loxostigma glabrifolium D.Fang & K.Y.Pan
- Loxostigma griffithii (Wight) C.B.Clarke
- Loxostigma hekouensis Lei Cai, Gui L.Zhang & Z.L.Dao
- Loxostigma kurzii (C.B.Clarke) B.L.Burtt
- Loxostigma longicaule (W.T.Wang & K.Y.Pan) Mich.Möller & Y.M.Shui
- Loxostigma mekongense (Franch.) B.L.Burtt
- Loxostigma musetorum H.W.Li
- Loxostigma puhoatense N.D.Do, N.S.Lý, D.H.Nguyễn & T.H.Lê
- Loxostigma vietnamense D.J.Middleton
