= Loxonia =

Scientific classification
- Kingdom: Plantae
- Clade: Tracheophytes
- Clade: Angiosperms
- Clade: Eudicots
- Clade: Asterids
- Order: Lamiales
- Family: Gesneriaceae
- Genus: Loxonia; Jack (1823)

Synonyms
- Loxophyllum Blume (1826)

Genus of plants

Loxonia is a genus of flowering plants belonging to the family Gesneriaceae. It includes three species native to Peninsular Malaysia, Sumatra, and Borneo.

Species:

- Loxonia burttiana A.Weber
- Loxonia discolor Jack
- Loxonia hirsuta Jack
