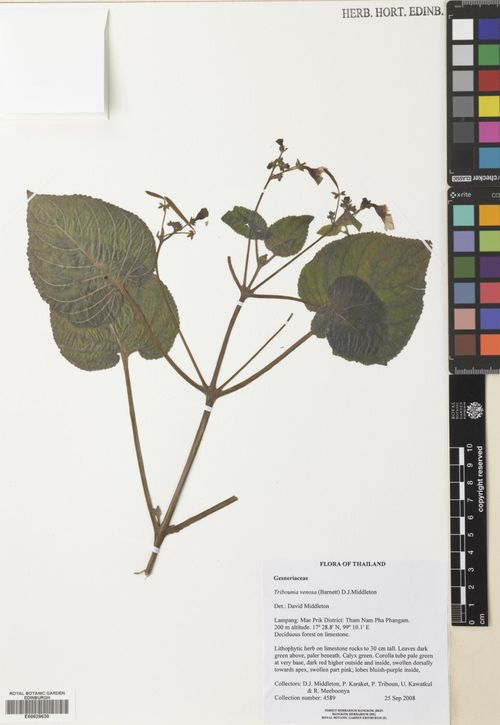

Scientific classification
- Kingdom: Plantae
- Clade: Embryophytes
- Clade: Tracheophytes
- Clade: Spermatophytes
- Clade: Angiosperms
- Clade: Eudicots
- Clade: Asterids
- Order: Lamiales
- Family: Gesneriaceae
- Genus: Tribounia
- Species: T. venosa

Binomial name
- Tribounia venosa (Barnett) D.J.Middleton

Synonyms
- Didymocarpus venosus Barnett

= Tribounia venosa =

Species of flowering plant

Tribounia venosa is a species of flowering plant in the family Gesneriaceae. The species grows on karst limestone in Thailand. It has purple, tube-shaped flowers.

T. venosa was described in 1961, and received its current name in 2012.

== Distribution ==
Tribounia venosa is native to the wet tropical biome of Thailand. It is endemic to the country, and grows in crevices in karst limestone.

== Taxonomy ==
Euphemia Cowan Barnett described the species, under the name Didymocarpus venosus, in 1961. However, it was recognised as misplaced in the genus Didymocarpus. In 2012, David Middleton moved the species to the newly created genus Tribounia, which contains one other species (Tribounia grandiflora).

== Description ==
Tribounia venosa is a herb, which grows up to 30 centimetres (0.98 ft) tall. It is probably an annual. The stems have hairs. The leaves are dark green with paler undersides, egg shaped, 3–9.2 centimetres (1.2–3.6 in) long, and 2–7.3 centimetres (0.79–2.87 in) wide. They grow on 3–10.5 centimetres (1.2–4.1 in) long stems.

The inflorescence is 9–17 centimetres (3.5–6.7 in) long, and grows on a 4–9.5 centimetres (1.6–3.7 in) long stem. The flowers are purple, and form a narrow tube. The flower stems are 1–1.4 centimetres (0.39–0.55 in) long. The petals of Tribounia venosa are laterally compressed, which may suggest pollination by moths or butterflies. This is distinct from the flowers of T. grandiflora, which have a longer base.

The fruits of Tribounia venosa are 1.9–3 centimetres (0.75–1.18 in) long, and 0.2–0.3 centimetres (0.079–0.118 in) wide. They are shorter than those of T. grandiflora. The seeds are around 3 millimetres (0.12 in) long, and around 2 millimetres (0.079 in) wide.

== Conservation ==
Tribounia venosa is fairly common, and would likely fall into the IUCN's Least Concern category. However, it has mainly been collected from non-protected areas.
