= Hequnia =

Scientific classification
- Kingdom: Plantae
- Clade: Tracheophytes
- Clade: Angiosperms
- Clade: Eudicots
- Clade: Asterids
- Order: Lamiales
- Family: Gesneriaceae
- Genus: Hequnia; Yin Z.Wang & F.P.Liu
- Species: H. guangxiensis

Binomial name
- Hequnia guangxiensis (H.Q.Wen, Y.G.Wei & S.H.Zhong) Yin Z.Wang & F.P.Liu

Synonyms
- Allocheilos guangxiensis H.Q.Wen, Y.G.Wei & S.H.Zhong

Genus of flowering plants

Hequnia is a genus of flowering plants in the family Gesneriaceae. It includes a single species, Hequnia guangxiensis, which is native to southeastern China.

The species was first described as Allocheilos guangxiensis in 2000. A phylogenetic analysis published in 2024 found that the genus Allocheilos was polyphyletic, and authors placed the paraphyletic species A. guangxiensis the new genus Hequnia as A. guangxiensis. The genus was named in honor of He‐Qun Wen (文和群), one of the discoverers of the type species.
