= Agalmyla hirta =

Scientific classification
- Kingdom: Plantae
- Clade: Tracheophytes
- Clade: Angiosperms
- Clade: Eudicots
- Clade: Asterids
- Order: Lamiales
- Family: Gesneriaceae
- Genus: Agalmyla
- Species: A. hirta

Binomial name
- Agalmyla hirta Hilliard & B.L.Burtt

Species of flowering plant

Agalmyla hirta is a species of plants in the family Gesneriaceae. It is found in New Guinea.
