= Palmatiboea =

Scientific classification
- Kingdom: Plantae
- Clade: Tracheophytes
- Clade: Angiosperms
- Clade: Eudicots
- Clade: Asterids
- Order: Lamiales
- Family: Gesneriaceae
- Subfamily: Didymocarpoideae
- Genus: Palmatiboea; F.P.Liu & Yin Z.Wang

Genus of flowering plants

Palmatiboea is a genus of flowering plants in the family Gesneriaceae. It includes 11 species native to southern China.

Species in the genus were formerly placed in Didymocarpus.

== Species ==
11 species are accepted.

- Palmatiboea cortusifolia (Hance) F.P.Liu & Yin Z.Wang
- Palmatiboea dissecta (F.Wen, Y.L.Qiu, Jie Huang & Y.G.Wei) F.P.Liu & Yin Z.Wang
- Palmatiboea gamosepalus (Xin Hong & F.Wen) F.Wen & Q.Fan
- Palmatiboea heucherifolia (Hand.-Mazz.) F.P.Liu & Yin Z.Wang
- Palmatiboea lobulata (F.Wen, Xin Hong & W.Y.Xie) F.P.Liu & Yin Z.Wang
- Palmatiboea pingyuanensis (Ling H.Yang, Q.Fan & F.Wen) F.Wen & Q.Fan
- Palmatiboea reniformis (W.T.Wang) F.P.Liu & Yin Z.Wang
- Palmatiboea salviiflora (Chun) F.P.Liu & Yin Z.Wang
- Palmatiboea sinoprimulina (W.T.Wang) F.P.Liu & Yin Z.Wang
- Palmatiboea yinzhengii (J.M.Li & Shi J.Li) F.Wen & Q.Fan
- Palmatiboea yuenlingensis (W.T.Wang) F.P.Liu & Yin Z.Wang
