= Agalmyla elegans =

Scientific classification
- Kingdom: Plantae
- Clade: Tracheophytes
- Clade: Angiosperms
- Clade: Eudicots
- Clade: Asterids
- Order: Lamiales
- Family: Gesneriaceae
- Genus: Agalmyla
- Species: A. elegans

Binomial name
- Agalmyla elegans (K.Schum. & Lauterb.) Hilliard & B.L.Burtt

Synonyms
- Dichrotrichum elegans K.Schum. & Lauterb.; Dichrotrichum schultzei Schltr.; Dichrotrichum torricellense Schltr

Species of flowering plant

Agalmyla elegans is a species of plants in the family Gesneriaceae. It is found in Papua New Guinea.
