= Napeanthus ecuadorensis =

Conservation status
- Data Deficient (IUCN 3.1)

Scientific classification
- Kingdom: Plantae
- Clade: Tracheophytes
- Clade: Angiosperms
- Clade: Eudicots
- Clade: Asterids
- Order: Lamiales
- Family: Gesneriaceae
- Genus: Napeanthus
- Species: N. ecuadorensis

Binomial name
- Napeanthus ecuadorensis Fritsch

Species of flowering plant

Napeanthus ecuadorensis is a species of plant in the family Gesneriaceae. It is endemic to Ecuador. Its natural habitat is subtropical or tropical moist montane forests.
