= Petrocodon longgangensis =

Scientific classification
- Kingdom: Plantae
- Clade: Tracheophytes
- Clade: Angiosperms
- Clade: Eudicots
- Clade: Asterids
- Order: Lamiales
- Family: Gesneriaceae
- Genus: Petrocodon
- Species: P. longgangensis

Binomial name
- Petrocodon longgangensis Xu et al., 2014

Species of flowering plant

Petrocodon longgangensis is a species of plant first found in limestone karsts of Guangxi, China. It is similar to Petrocodon coriaceifolius, differing in the texture, size and shape of its leaves; the size and pubescence of its inflorescence and corolla; the shape of its anther; and length of its pistil.
