= Diastema (disambiguation) =

A diastema is a gap between two adjacent teeth.

Diastema may refer to:

- Diastema (moth), a genus of moths in the family Noctuidae
- Diastema (plant), a flowering plant in the family Gesneriaceae
