= Petrocodon albinervius =

Scientific classification
- Kingdom: Plantae
- Clade: Tracheophytes
- Clade: Angiosperms
- Clade: Eudicots
- Clade: Asterids
- Order: Lamiales
- Family: Gesneriaceae
- Genus: Petrocodon
- Species: P. albinervius

Binomial name
- Petrocodon albinervius D.X. Nong & Y.S. Huang

Species of flowering plant

Petrocodon albinervius is a species of flowering plant in the genus Petrocodon found in limestone areas in southwestern Guangxi.
