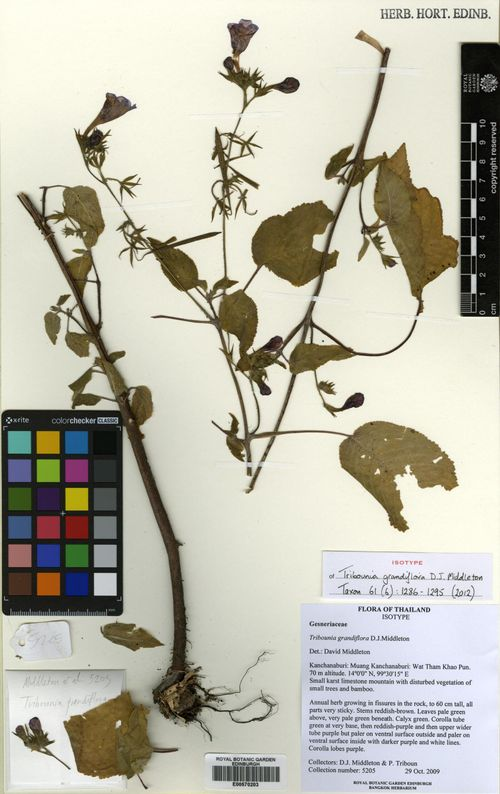

Scientific classification
- Kingdom: Plantae
- Clade: Embryophytes
- Clade: Tracheophytes
- Clade: Spermatophytes
- Clade: Angiosperms
- Clade: Eudicots
- Clade: Asterids
- Order: Lamiales
- Family: Gesneriaceae
- Genus: Tribounia
- Species: T. grandiflora

Binomial name
- Tribounia grandiflora D.J.Middleton

= Tribounia grandiflora =

Species of flowering plant

Tribounia grandiflora is a species of flowering plant in the family Gesneriaceae. The species has purple flowers, which form a narrow tube.

Tribounia grandiflora was described in 2012. It is native to karst limestone habitats in Thailand, and may be endangered.

== Distribution ==
Tribounia grandiflora is native to the wet tropical biome of Thailand, and endemic to the country. It grows in fissures in karst limestone, in deciduous forest. Its extent of occurrence is less than 300 square kilometres (120 sq mi).

== Taxonomy ==
The species was described by David Middleton in 2012.

Middleton and Pramote Triboun collected the holotype in 2009. It was found in Thailand's Kanchanaburi province, at an elevation of 70 metres (230 ft), on a karst limestone mountain. The discovery of this plant, alongside other specimens, led to the creation of the genus Tribounia.

== Description ==
Tribounia grandiflora is a herb which grows up to 60 centimetres (2.0 ft) tall. The plant is sticky, and probably an annual. The stems are reddish-brown, and hairy. The leaves are pale green. They measure 5.5–17 centimetres (2.2–6.7 in) long, and 2.7–9 centimetres (1.1–3.5 in) wide. The leaf stalks are 2.5–11 centimetres (0.98–4.33 in) long.

The inflorescences are 6–16 centimetres (2.4–6.3 in) long, and grow on 3–7 centimetres (1.2–2.8 in) stalks. The flower stalks are 0.8–1.2 centimetres (0.31–0.47 in) long. The petals of Tribounia grandiflora collectively measure 3.3–3.8 centimetres (1.3–1.5 in). The petals form a long, narrow, tube, which is green at the base, then turns to reddish-purple. The tube could suggest pollination by long tongued bees. The flowers are purple.

The fruits are 44–54 millimetres (1.7–2.1 in) by 2.5–4.0 millimetres (0.098–0.157 in), and covered in short hairs. The seeds are around 4 millimetres (0.16 in) long, and 3 millimetres (0.12 in) wide.

The flowers and fruits of Tribounia grandiflora are larger than those of Tribounia venosa.

== Conservation ==
Tribounia grandiflora may be endangered. Its habitat is threatened by agriculture and deforestation. The species is not known to occur in any protected areas.
