= Cremersia =

Cremersia may refer to:

- Cremersia (fly), a genus of flies in the family Phoridae
- Cremersia (plant), a genus of plants in the family Gesneriaceae
