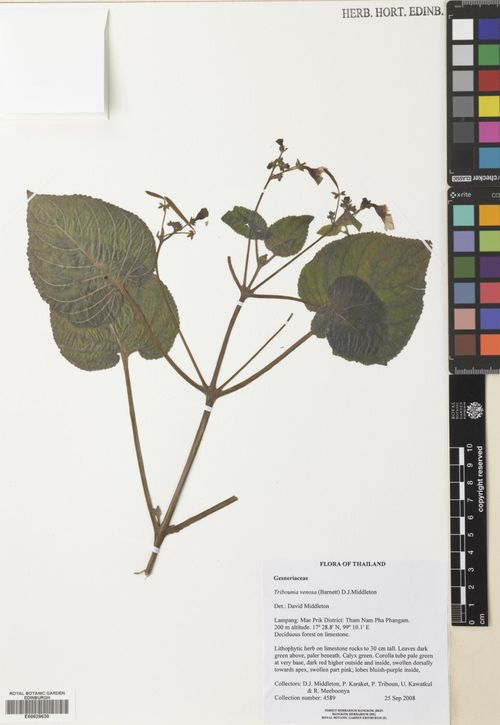
- Tribounia venosa

Scientific classification
- Kingdom: Plantae
- Clade: Tracheophytes
- Clade: Angiosperms
- Clade: Eudicots
- Clade: Asterids
- Order: Lamiales
- Family: Gesneriaceae
- Genus: Tribounia; D.J.Middleton (2012)

= Tribounia =

Genus of flowering plants

Tribounia is a genus of flowering plants in the family Gesneriaceae. It contains two species, which are both endemic to Thailand. The genus was created in 2012.

== Distribution ==
It is native to Thailand. Both species are endemic to the country, and grow in crevices on karst limestone.

== Species ==
Known species, according to Kew:

- Tribounia grandiflora D.J.Middleton
- Tribounia venosa (Barnett) D.J.Middleton

== Taxonomy ==
The genus was first described and published in Taxon, in 2012. It was created alongside the description of T. grandiflora, and resolved the taxonomic placement of T. venosa, which had previously been placed in Didymocarpus.

A genetic analysis found Tribounia to be closely related to Didissandra.

== Description ==
Tribounia are herbs characterised by a prominent boss on the corolla. The plants have two fertile stames, which protude into the boss. The genus also has fruits that hang on long stems. Both species have tube-shaped, purple flowers.

== Etymology ==
The genus name of Tribounia is in honour of Pramote Triboun (fl. 1990 – 2002), a Thai botanist at the Thailand Institute of Scientific and Technological Research.
