= Nomopyle =

Scientific classification
- Kingdom: Plantae
- Clade: Tracheophytes
- Clade: Angiosperms
- Clade: Eudicots
- Clade: Asterids
- Order: Lamiales
- Family: Gesneriaceae
- Genus: Nomopyle; Roalson & Boggan (2005)

Genus of plants

Nomopyle is a genus of flowering plants belonging to the family Gesneriaceae.

Its native range is Western South America.

== Species ==
Species:

- Nomopyle dodsonii (Wiehler) Roalson & Boggan
- Nomopyle peruviana (Wiehler) Roalson & Boggan
