= Pagothyra =

Scientific classification
- Kingdom: Plantae
- Clade: Tracheophytes
- Clade: Angiosperms
- Clade: Eudicots
- Clade: Asterids
- Order: Lamiales
- Family: Gesneriaceae
- Genus: Pagothyra (Leeuwenb.) J.F.Sm. & J.L.Clark (2013)
- Species: P. maculata

Binomial name
- Pagothyra maculata (Hook.f.) J.F.Sm. & J.L.Clark (2013)

Synonyms
- Episcia maculata Hook.f. (1890); Paradrymonia maculata (Hook.f.) Wiehler (1978)

Genus of plants

Pagothyra is a genus of flowering plants belonging to the family Gesneriaceae. It contains a single species, Pagothyra maculata, an epiphyte native to Venezuela, Guyana, and French Guiana.
