= Petrocodon =

Scientific classification
- Kingdom: Plantae
- Clade: Tracheophytes
- Clade: Angiosperms
- Clade: Eudicots
- Clade: Asterids
- Order: Lamiales
- Family: Gesneriaceae
- Subfamily: Didymocarpoideae
- Genus: Petrocodon; Hance (1883)

Type species
- Petrocodon dealbatus Hance

Species
- 56; see text

Synonyms
- Allocheilos W.T.Wang; Calcareoboea C.Y.Wu; Calcareoboea C.Y.Wu ex H.W.Li; Dolicholoma D.Fang & W.T.Wang; Lagarosolen W.T.Wang; Paralagarosolen Y.G.Wei; Tengia Chun

Genus of plants

Petrocodon is a genus of the family Gesneriaceae. It includes 51 species native to southern China and Indochina (Cambodia, Laos, Thailand, and Vietnam). Petrocodon formerly had few species, but recent genetic analysis has refined our understanding of the genus. Calcareoboea, Paralagarosolen, Dolicholoma, and Tengia monotypic genera have been transferred to Petrocodon, as well as some Didymocarpus and Lagarosolen species.

== Species ==
56 species are accepted.

- Petrocodon ainsliifolius W.H.Chen & Y.M.Shui
- Petrocodon albinervius D.X.Nong & Y.S.Huang
- Petrocodon anoectochilus F.Wen & B.Pan
- Petrocodon asterocalyx F.Wen, Y.G.Wei & R.L.Zhang
- Petrocodon asterostriatus F.Wen, Y.G.Wei & W.C.Chou
- Petrocodon bonii (Pellegr.) Mich.Möller & A.Weber
- Petrocodon chishuiensis Z.B.Xin, F.Wen & S.B.Zhou
- Petrocodon chongqingensis F.Wen, B.Pan & L.Y.Su
- Petrocodon confertiflorus Hui Qin Li & Y.Q.Wang
- Petrocodon coriaceifolius (Y.G.Wei) Y.G.Wei & A.Weber
- Petrocodon cortusiflorus (W.T.Wang) Yin Z.Wang, F.P.Liu & M.Q.Han
- Petrocodon dealbatus Hance
- Petrocodon fangianus (Y.G.Wei) J.M.Li & Yin Z.Wang
- Petrocodon ferrugineus Y.G.Wei
- Petrocodon flavus D.J.Middleton & Sangvir.
- Petrocodon gracilis T.Ding & B.Pan
- Petrocodon guangxiensis (Yan Liu & W.B.Xu) W.B.Xu & K.F.Chung
- Petrocodon hancei (Hemsl.) Mich.Möller & A.Weber
- Petrocodon hechiensis (Y.G.Wei, Yan Liu & F.Wen) Y.G.Wei & Mich.Möller
- Petrocodon hispidus (W.T.Wang) A.Weber & Mich.Möller
- Petrocodon hunanensis X.L.Yu & Ming Li
- Petrocodon integrifolius (D.Fang & L.Zeng) A.Weber & Mich.Möller
- Petrocodon ionophyllus F.Wen, S.Li & B.Pan
- Petrocodon jasminiflorus (D.Fang & W.T.Wang) A.Weber & Mich.Möller
- Petrocodon jiangxiensis F.Wen, L.F.Fu & L.Y.Su
- Petrocodon jingxiensis (Yan Liu, H.S.Gao & W.B.Xu) A.Weber & Mich.Möller
- Petrocodon lancifolius F.Wen & Y.G.Wei
- Petrocodon laxicymosus W.B.Xu & Yan Liu
- Petrocodon leveilleanus (Fedde) X.X.Bai & F.Wen
- Petrocodon liboensis Sheng H.Tang & Jia W.Yang
- Petrocodon longgangensis W.H.Wu & W.B.Xu
- Petrocodon longitubus Cong R.Li & Yang Luo
- Petrocodon lui (Yan Liu & W.B.Xu) A.Weber & Mich.Möller
- Petrocodon luteoflorus Lei Cai & F.Wen
- Petrocodon maguanensis (W.H.Chen & Y.M.Shui) Yin Z.Wang, F.P.Liu & M.Q.Han
- Petrocodon mollifolius (W.T.Wang) A.Weber & Mich.Möller
- Petrocodon multiflorus F.Wen & Y.S.Jiang
- Petrocodon niveolanosus (D.Fang & W.T.Wang) A.Weber & Mich.Möller
- Petrocodon paradelphinius F.Wen & W.C.Chou
- Petrocodon pseudocoriaceifolius Yan Liu & W.B.Xu
- Petrocodon pulchriflorus Y.B.Lu & Q.Zhang
- Petrocodon retroflexus Qiang Zhang & J.Guo
- Petrocodon rubiginosus Y.G.Wei & R.L.Zhang
- Petrocodon rubroglandulosus (W.H.Chen & Y.M.Shui) Yin Z.Wang, F.P.Liu & M.Q.Han
- Petrocodon rubrostriatus K.Tan, X.Q.Song & M.X.Ren
- Petrocodon scopulorum (Chun) Yin Z.Wang
- Petrocodon subpalmatinervis (W.T.Wang) F.Wen & Z.L.Li
- Petrocodon tenuitubus W.H.Chen, F.Wen & Y.M.Shui
- Petrocodon tiandengensis (Yan Liu & B.Pan) A.Weber & Mich.Möller
- Petrocodon tongziensis R.B.Zhang & F.Wen
- Petrocodon urceolatus F.Wen, H.F.Cen & L.F.Fu
- Petrocodon vietnamensis Z.B.Xin, T.V.Do & F.Wen
- Petrocodon villosus Xin Hong, F.Wen & S.B.Zhou
- Petrocodon viridescens W.H.Chen, Mich.Möller & Y.M.Shui
- Petrocodon wenshanensis Xin Hong, W.H.Qin & F.Wen
- Petrocodon wui F.Wen & R.B.Zhang
