= Tylopsacas =

Scientific classification
- Kingdom: Plantae
- Clade: Tracheophytes
- Clade: Angiosperms
- Clade: Eudicots
- Clade: Asterids
- Order: Lamiales
- Family: Gesneriaceae
- Genus: Tylopsacas; Leeuwenb.
- Species: T. cuneata

Binomial name
- Tylopsacas cuneata (Gleason) Leeuwenb. (1960)

Synonyms
- Tylosperma Leeuwenb. (1958), nom. illeg.; Episcia cuneata Gleason (1931); Tylosperma cuneatum (Gleason) Leeuwenb. (1958)

Genus of flowering plants

Tylopsacas is a genus of flowering plants belonging to the family Gesneriaceae.

It includes a single species, Tylopsacas cuneata, which is native to Guyana and southern Venezuela.
