= Lembocarpus =

Scientific classification
- Kingdom: Plantae
- Clade: Tracheophytes
- Clade: Angiosperms
- Clade: Eudicots
- Clade: Asterids
- Order: Lamiales
- Family: Gesneriaceae
- Genus: Lembocarpus; Leeuwenb. (1958)
- Species: L. amoenus

Binomial name
- Lembocarpus amoenus Leeuwenb. (1958)

Genus of plants

Lembocarpus is a genus of flowering plants belonging to the family Gesneriaceae.

It contains a single species, Lembocarpus amoenus, which is native to French Guiana and Suriname in northern South America.
