= Mandirola =

Scientific classification
- Kingdom: Plantae
- Clade: Embryophytes
- Clade: Tracheophytes
- Clade: Spermatophytes
- Clade: Angiosperms
- Clade: Eudicots
- Clade: Asterids
- Order: Lamiales
- Family: Gesneriaceae
- Genus: Mandirola; Decne.

Genus of plants

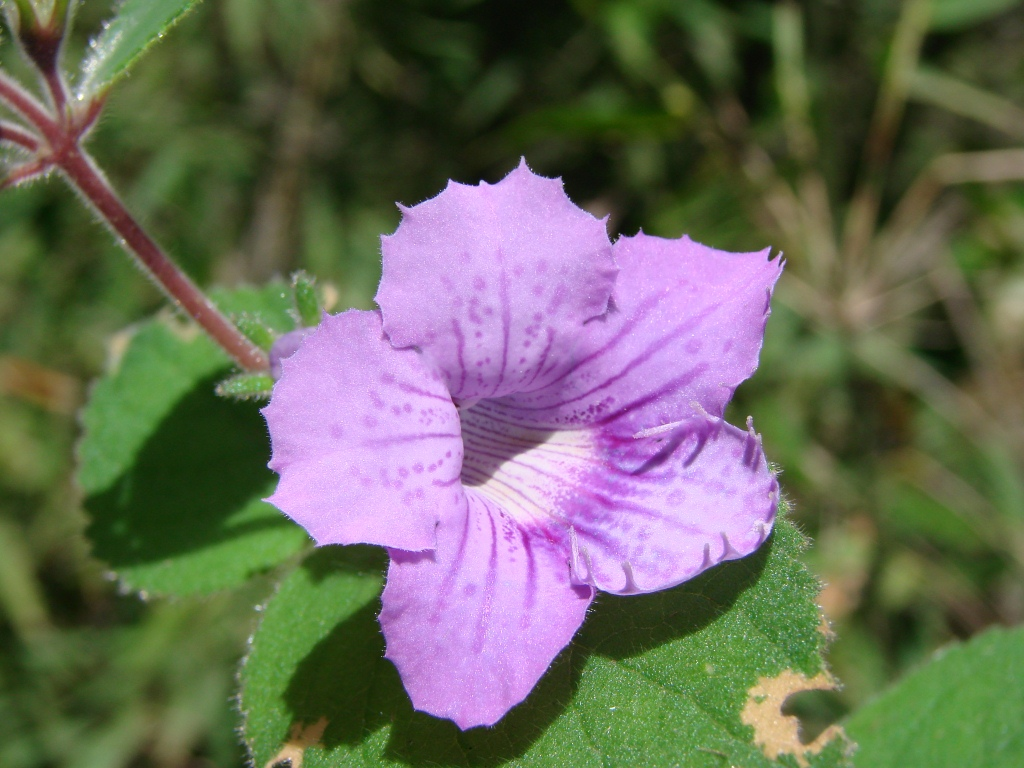
Mandirola multiflora in Brazil

Mandirola is a genus of flowering plants belonging to the family Gesneriaceae.

It is native to Bolivia and Brazil.

The genus name of Mandirola is in honour of Agostino Mandirola (d. 1661), Italian clergyman, naturalist and botanist with a focus on medicinal plants and citrus. It was first described and published in Rev. Hort. (Paris), sér.3, Vol.2 on page 468 in 1848.

== Known species ==
According to Kew:

- Mandirola hirsuta (DC.) A.O.Araujo & Chautems
- Mandirola ichthyostoma (Gardner) Seem. ex Hanst.
- Mandirola rupestris (Gardner) Roalson & Boggan
