= Napeanthus =

Scientific classification
- Kingdom: Plantae
- Clade: Tracheophytes
- Clade: Angiosperms
- Clade: Eudicots
- Clade: Asterids
- Order: Lamiales
- Family: Gesneriaceae
- Genus: Napeanthus; Gardner (1843)

Synonyms
- Hatschbachia L.B.Sm. (1953); Marssonia H.Karst. (1860)

Genus of flowering plants

Napeanthus is a genus of plant in family Gesneriaceae. It includes 17 species of terrestrial, perennial herbs with rhizomes native to the tropical Americas, ranging from Mexico to Bolivia and southern Brazil.

== Species ==
17 species are accepted.

1. Napeanthus andinus Rusby
2. Napeanthus angustifolius Feuillet & L.E.Skog
3. Napeanthus apodemus Donn.Sm.
4. Napeanthus bracteatus C.V.Morton
5. Napeanthus ecuadorensis Fritsch
6. Napeanthus jelskii Fritsch
7. Napeanthus loretensis L.E.Skog
8. Napeanthus macrostoma Leeuwenb.
9. Napeanthus primulifolius (Raddi) Sandwith
10. Napeanthus primulinus (H.Karst.) Benth. & Hook.f. ex B.D.Jacks.
11. Napeanthus reitzii (L.B.Sm.) B.L.Burtt ex Leeuwenb.
12. Napeanthus rigidus Rusby
13. Napeanthus riparius Philipson
14. Napeanthus robustus Fritsch
15. Napeanthus rupicola Feuillet & L.E.Skog
16. Napeanthus spathulatus Leeuwenb.
17. Napeanthus subacaulis (Griseb.) Benth. & Hook.f. ex Kuntze
