= Rhoogeton =

Scientific classification
- Kingdom: Plantae
- Clade: Tracheophytes
- Clade: Angiosperms
- Clade: Eudicots
- Clade: Asterids
- Order: Lamiales
- Family: Gesneriaceae
- Genus: Rhoogeton; Leeuwenb. (1958)

Genus of plants

Rhoogeton is a genus of flowering plants belonging to the family Gesneriaceae.

Its native range is Venezuela to Guyana and Northern Brazil.

Species:

- Rhoogeton cyclophyllus Leeuwenb.
- Rhoogeton viviparus Leeuwenb.
