= Sanango =

Conservation status
- Least Concern (IUCN 3.1)

Scientific classification
- Kingdom: Plantae
- Clade: Tracheophytes
- Clade: Angiosperms
- Clade: Eudicots
- Clade: Asterids
- Order: Lamiales
- Family: Gesneriaceae
- Subfamily: Sanangoideae; A.Weber, J.L.Clark & Mich.Möller
- Genus: Sanango; G.S.Bunting & J.A.Duke (1961)
- Species: S. racemosum

Binomial name
- Sanango racemosum (Ruiz & Pav.) Barringer

Synonyms
- Gomara racemosa Ruiz & Pav.; Gomaranthus racemosus (Ruíz & Pav.) Rauschert; Russelia racemosa (Ruiz & Pav.) Wettst.; Sanango durum Bunting & Duke

Genus of flowering plants

Sanango is a genus of flowering plants containing a single species, Sanango racemosum. It is a shrub or tree native to Ecuador and Peru.

The genus was originally placed in family Loganiaceae but has since been variously placed in Scrophulariaceae, Gesneriaceae and Buddlejaceae. As of 2016 it is considered to be the sister genus to the family Gesneriaceae as previously defined, and the family was tentatively enlarged to include the genus, pending a revision of the families included in Lamiales. It has been placed as the only genus in the monotypic subfamily Sanangoideae.
