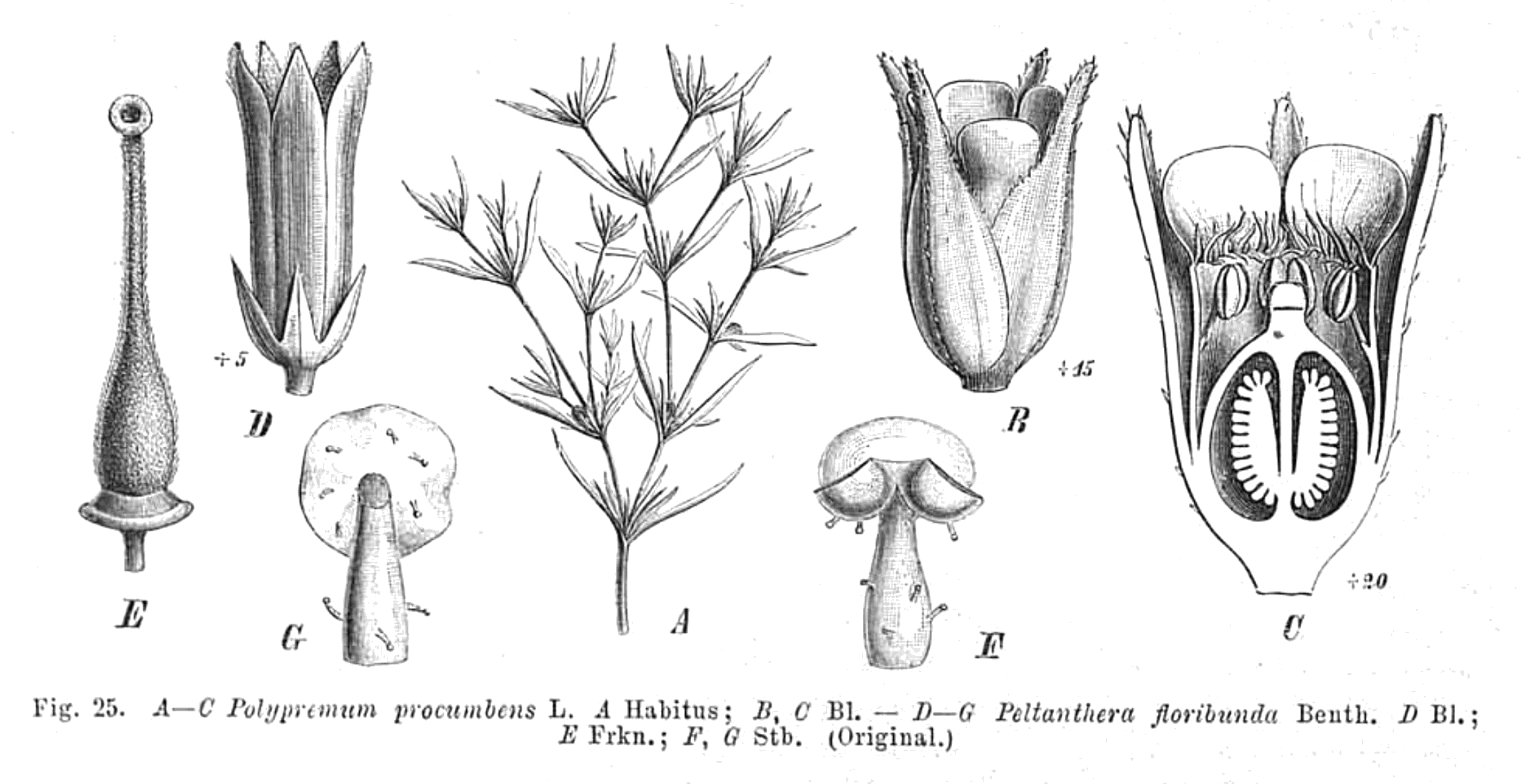
- D-G: Peltanthera floribunda D. Flower. E. Ovary. F/G. Anthers

Scientific classification
- Kingdom: Plantae
- Clade: Tracheophytes
- Clade: Angiosperms
- Clade: Eudicots
- Clade: Asterids
- Order: Lamiales
- Family: Gesneriaceae
- Genus: Peltanthera; Benth.
- Species: P. floribunda

Binomial name
- Peltanthera floribunda Benth. & Hook.f.

Synonyms
- Of the genus: Valerioa Standl. & Steyerm.; Of the species: Peltanthera costaricensis (Standl. & Steyerm.) Cuatrec.; Valerioa costaricensis Standl. & Steyerm.

= Peltanthera =

Genus of flowering plants

Peltanthera is a genus of flowering plants containing a single species, Peltanthera floribunda. The genus was originally placed in family Loganiaceae and has since been variously placed in Buddlejaceae, Scrophulariaceae, Gesneriaceae, or in its own family Peltantheraceae. In 2016, it was considered by the Angiosperm Phylogeny Group to be unplaced in any family, but within the order Lamiales, while Christenhusz et al. in 2017 placed it in family Gesneriaceae as subfamily Peltantheroideae. The placement in Gesneriaceae was accepted by Plants of the World Online as of March 2024.

The plant is a tree with opposite leaf arrangement. The leaves are large and elliptic in shape. It has white fragrant flowers in a cymose inflorescence with trichotomous branches. The calyx and corolla each have five lobes, and there are five stamens. The two locules of the ovary each contain many seeds.
