= Shuaria =

Scientific classification
- Kingdom: Plantae
- Clade: Tracheophytes
- Clade: Angiosperms
- Clade: Eudicots
- Clade: Asterids
- Order: Lamiales
- Family: Gesneriaceae
- Genus: Shuaria; D.A.Neill & J.L.Clark
- Species: S. ecuadorica

Binomial name
- Shuaria ecuadorica D.A.Neill & J.L.Clark

Genus of plants

Shuaria is a genus of arborescent flowering plants belonging to the family Gesneriaceae. The genus is represented by just one species, Shuaria ecuadorica D.A.Neill & J.L.Clark, endemic to Ecuador. The generic name refers to the Shuar indigenous group of Amazonian Ecuador where several collections were made from the forests owned by the Shuar communities. Furthermore, the known range of S.ecuadorica corresponds quite closely to the ancestral Shuar territory in Pastaza, Morona-Santiago, and Zamora-Chinchipe provinces.

== Description ==
The genus Shuaria and it species Shuaria ecuadorica were described and named by David Alan Neill and John Littner Clark in 2010. It is a multistemmed shrub or small tree, growing to 5 m, occasionally to 8 m tall. It is unusual in its phyllotaxis, in which opposite and alternate leaves can occur on the same twig, typically alternate leaves at the base of a season's growth and opposite leaves at the tip. The leaves are lanceolate, 9.5–19 cm long and 1.5–5.0 cm wide, with a 5–15 mm petiole, and a finely toothed margin. The small white flowers are arranged in cymes.
