= Centrosolenia =

Scientific classification
- Kingdom: Plantae
- Clade: Tracheophytes
- Clade: Angiosperms
- Clade: Eudicots
- Clade: Asterids
- Order: Lamiales
- Family: Gesneriaceae
- Genus: Centrosolenia; Benth.

Genus of flowering plants

Centrosolenia is a genus of flowering plants belonging to the family Gesneriaceae.

Its native range is Northern South America to Northern Brazil.

Species:

- Centrosolenia bryogeton (Leeuwenb.) M.M.Mora & J.L.Clark
- Centrosolenia chimantensis (L.E.Skog & Steyerm.) M.M.Mora & J.L.Clark
- Centrosolenia coccinea (Feuillet & L.E.Skog) M.M.Mora & J.L.Clark
- Centrosolenia crenata (Feuillet) M.M.Mora & J.L.Clark
- Centrosolenia densa (C.H.Wright) Sprague
- Centrosolenia hirsuta Benth.
- Centrosolenia orinocensis (Feuillet) M.M.Mora & J.L.Clark
- Centrosolenia paujiensis (Feuillet) M.M.Mora & J.L.Clark
- Centrosolenia porphyrotricha (Leeuwenb.) M.M.Mora & J.L.Clark
- Centrosolenia pusilla (Feuillet) M.M.Mora & J.L.Clark
- Centrosolenia rosea (Feuillet) M.M.Mora & J.L.Clark
- Centrosolenia rubra (Feuillet) M.M.Mora & J.L.Clark
- Centrosolenia vestita (Feuillet) M.M.Mora & J.L.Clark
