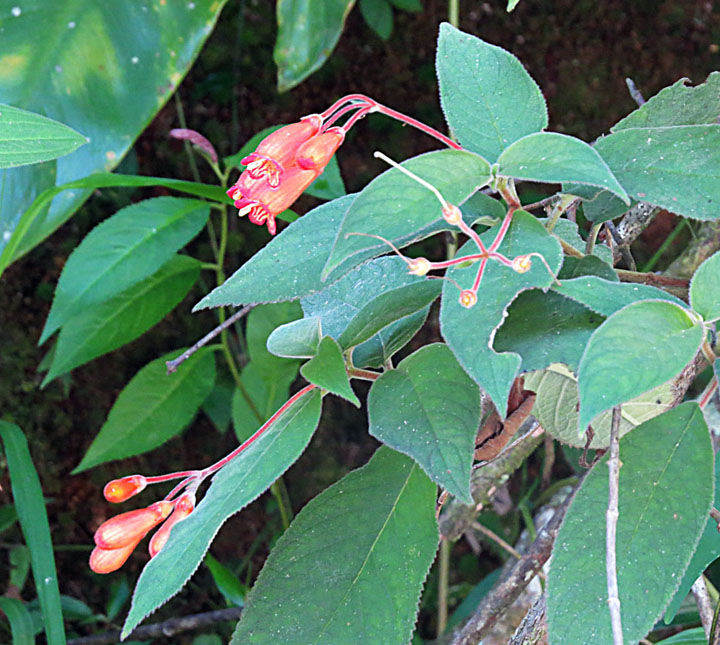
- Moussonia deppeana

Scientific classification
- Kingdom: Plantae
- Clade: Tracheophytes
- Clade: Angiosperms
- Clade: Eudicots
- Clade: Asterids
- Order: Lamiales
- Family: Gesneriaceae
- Genus: Moussonia; Regel (1847), nom. cons.

= Moussonia (plant) =

Genus of flowering plants

Moussonia is a genus of plants in the family Gesneriaceae. Its native range stretches from Mexico to Central America. It is found in Costa Rica, El Salvador, Guatemala, Honduras, Mexico and Panamá.

== Description ==
They are herbaceous plants, or shrubs. It has an erect, branched stem, without scaly rhizomes. The leaves are arranged in the opposite way. The inflorescences are axillary, in cymes or solitary flowers. The corolla is red, orange or yellow, in the form of a long tube, which is broader in the centre. With the base of the extremities and narrow throat. The fruit (or seed capsule) is a dry, ovoid or ellipsoidal bivalve capsule.

== Taxonomy ==
It was previously included in the genus Kohleria, but with a different chromosomal number 2n=11, the ring-shaped nectary and without rhizomes. The molecular results support the separation of this genus.

The genus name of Moussonia is in honour of Albert Mousson (1805–1890), a physicist and a malacologist from Switzerland. It was first described and published in Flora Vol.31 on page 248 in 1848.

== Species ==
Plants of the World Online (Kew) accepts 24 species;

- Moussonia adpressipilosa D.L.Denham ex Ram.-Roa
- Moussonia ampla L.E.Skog
- Moussonia benitojuarezii Ram.-Roa & Flores-Fausto
- Moussonia collina (Brandegee) Ram.-Roa
- Moussonia costaricensis Klotzsch ex Oerst.
- Moussonia deppeana (Schltdl. & Cham.) Klotzsch ex Hanst.
- Moussonia elegans Decne.
- Moussonia fruticosa (Brandegee) Wiehler
- Moussonia hirsutissima (C.V.Morton) Wiehler
- Moussonia jaliscana (S.Watson) D.L.Denham ex Ram.-Roa
- Moussonia larryskogii Ram.-Roa
- Moussonia orientalis Ram.-Roa
- Moussonia papillosa Oerst. ex Hanst.
- Moussonia pedunculata (Brandegee) Ram.-Roa
- Moussonia pendula (C.V.Morton) Ram.-Roa
- Moussonia rupicola (Standl. & L.O.Williams) Wiehler
- Moussonia serrulata (C.V.Morton) Wiehler
- Moussonia skutchii (C.V.Morton & D.N.Gibson) Wiehler
- Moussonia solitaria (C.V.Morton) Ram.-Roa
- Moussonia strigosa (C.V.Morton) Wiehler
- Moussonia tacanaensis Ram.-Roa
- Moussonia tenuiflora Ram.-Roa
- Moussonia triflora (M.Martens & Galeotti) Hanst.
- Moussonia viminalis (Brandegee) Wiehler

Moussonia elegans Decne. is the type species.

== Other sources ==
- Roalson, E. H., J. K. Boggan & L. E. Skog 2005. Reorganization of tribal and generic boundaries in the Gloxinieae (Gesneriaceae: Gesnerioideae) and the description of a new tribe in the Gesnerioideae, Sphaerorrhizeae. Selbyana 25(2): 225–238.
- Stevens, W. D., C. Ulloa U., A. Pool & O. M. Montiel 2001. Flora de Nicaragua. Monogr. Syst. Bot. Missouri Bot. Gard. 85: i–xlii, 1–2666
- Data related to Moussonia (plant) at Wikispecies
- Media related to Moussonia at Wikimedia Commons
