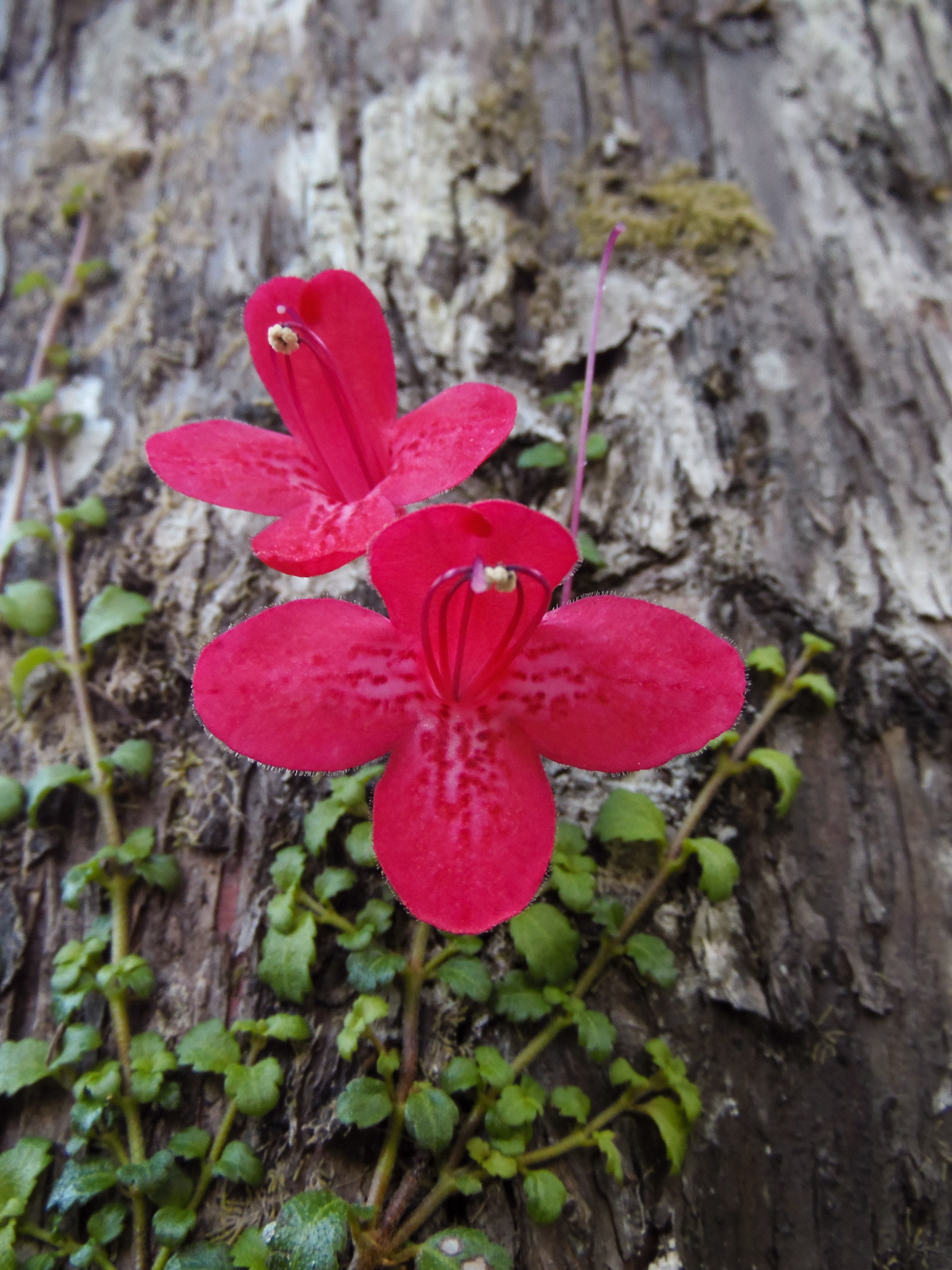
- Asteranthera ovata

Scientific classification
- Kingdom: Plantae
- Clade: Tracheophytes
- Clade: Angiosperms
- Clade: Eudicots
- Clade: Asterids
- Order: Lamiales
- Family: Gesneriaceae
- Genus: Asteranthera; Hanst. (1853)
- Species: A. ovata

Binomial name
- Asteranthera ovata (Cav.) Hanst. (1866)

Synonyms
- Asteranthera chiloensis Hanst. (1853); Columnea ovata Cav. (1798)

= Asteranthera =

Genus of flowering plants

Asteranthera is a monotypic plant genus in the family Gesneriaceae, native to the humid temperate forests of Argentina and Chile. The sole species in the genus, Asteranthera ovata, is an evergreen scrambling vine. The plant has small rounded leaves with scalloped margins. The flowers are tubular and two-lipped, red with white markings. It blooms in the summer and can be grown as a climber or ground cover.
