= Chautemsia =

Scientific classification
- Kingdom: Plantae
- Clade: Tracheophytes
- Clade: Angiosperms
- Clade: Eudicots
- Clade: Asterids
- Order: Lamiales
- Family: Gesneriaceae
- Genus: Chautemsia; A.O.Araujo & V.C.Souza (2010)
- Species: C. calcicola

Binomial name
- Chautemsia calcicola A.O.Araujo & V.C.Souza (2010)

Genus of flowering plants

Chautemsia is a genus of flowering plants belonging to the family Gesneriaceae. It includes a single species, Chautemsia calcicola, which is native to Minas Gerais state in southeastern Brazil.
