= Christopheria =

Scientific classification
- Kingdom: Plantae
- Clade: Tracheophytes
- Clade: Angiosperms
- Clade: Eudicots
- Clade: Asterids
- Order: Lamiales
- Family: Gesneriaceae
- Genus: Christopheria; J.F.Sm. & J.L.Clark (2013)
- Species: C. xantha

Binomial name
- Christopheria xantha (Leeuwenb.) J.F.Sm. & J.L.Clark (2013)

Synonyms
- Episcia xantha Leeuwenb. (1980)

Genus of flowering plants

Christopheria is a genus of flowering plants belonging to the family Gesneriaceae. It contains a single species, Christopheria xantha, a subshrub native to Venezuela and French Guiana in northern South America.
