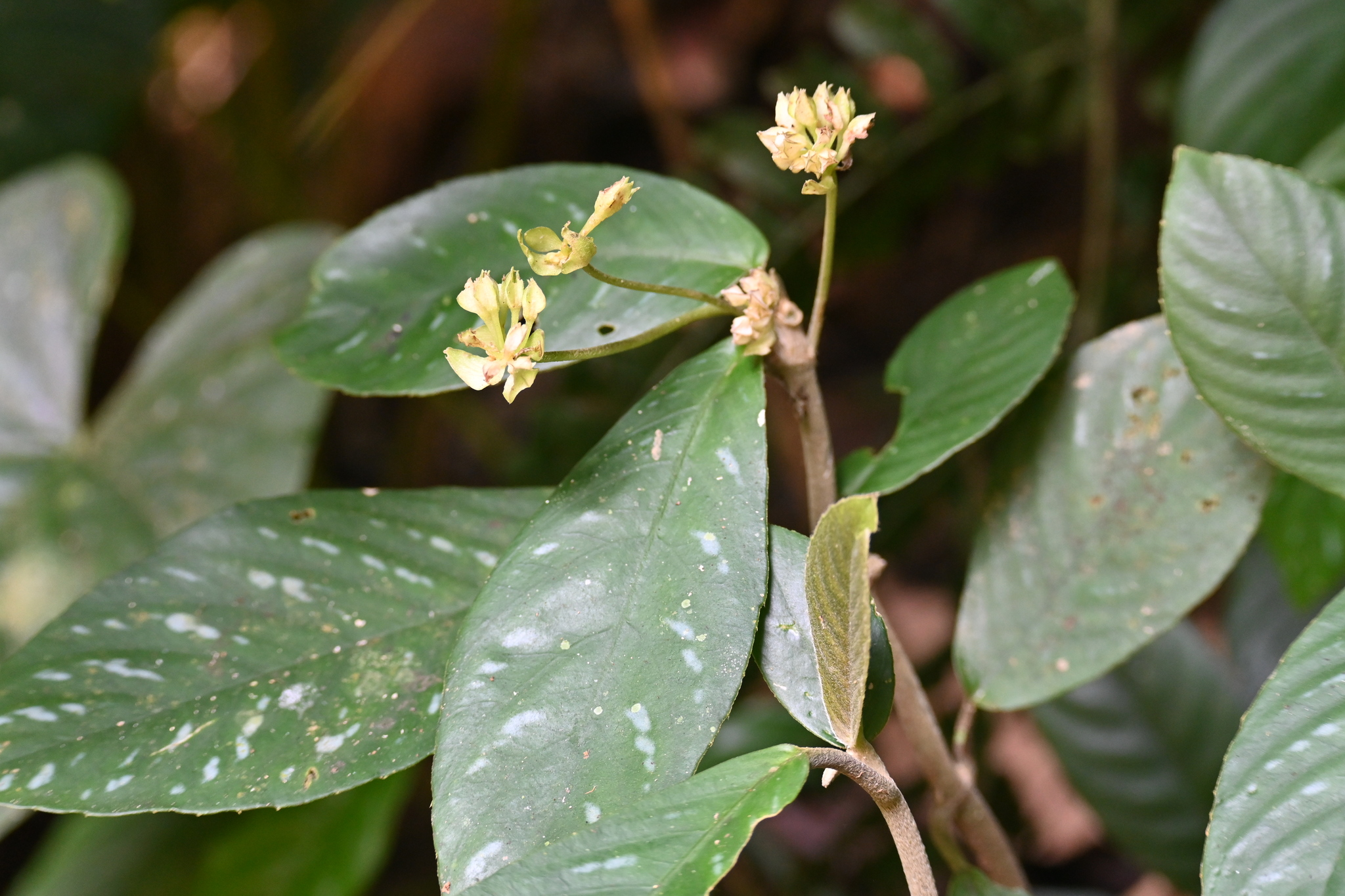
- Cremospermopsis parviflora

Scientific classification
- Kingdom: Plantae
- Clade: Tracheophytes
- Clade: Angiosperms
- Clade: Eudicots
- Clade: Asterids
- Order: Lamiales
- Family: Gesneriaceae
- Genus: Cremospermopsis; L.E.Skog & L.P.Kvist

= Cremospermopsis =

Genus of flowering plants

Cremospermopsis is a genus of flowering plants in the family Gesneriaceae. Species of the genus are native range to Colombia.

== Species ==
The following species are recognised in the genus Cremospermopsis:

- Cremospermopsis cestroides (Fritsch) L.E.Skog & L.P.Kvist
- Cremospermopsis galaxias J.L.Clark & Clavijo
- Cremospermopsis parviflora L.E.Skog & L.P.Kvist
