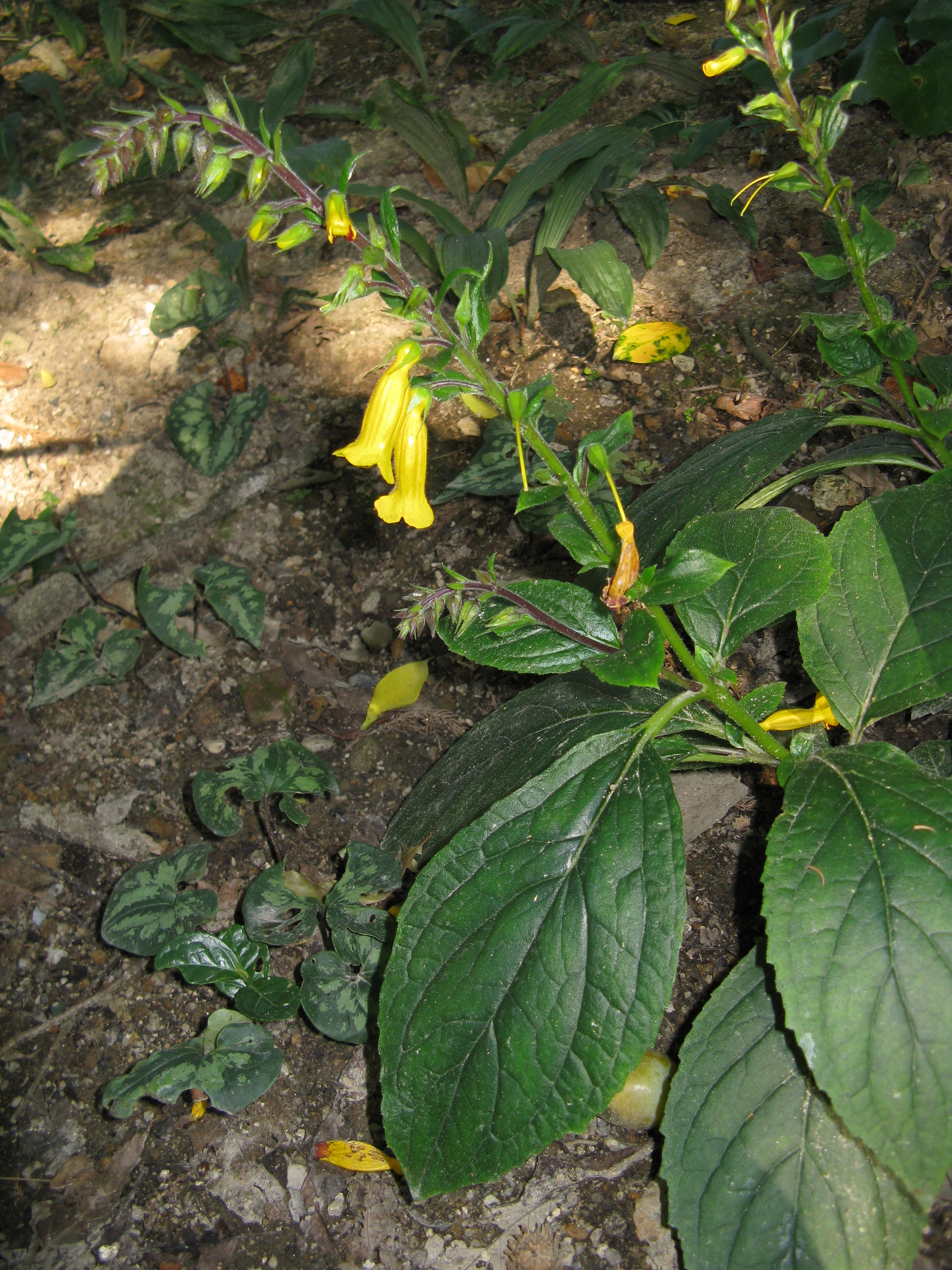

Scientific classification
- Kingdom: Plantae
- Clade: Tracheophytes
- Clade: Angiosperms
- Clade: Eudicots
- Clade: Asterids
- Order: Lamiales
- Family: Gesneriaceae
- Genus: Titanotrichum; Soler. (1909)
- Species: T. oldhamii

Binomial name
- Titanotrichum oldhamii (Hemsl.) Soler.

Synonyms
- Matsumuria Hemsl.; Matsumuria oldhamii (Hemsl.) Hemsl. (1909); Rehmannia oldhamii Hemsl. (1890)

= Titanotrichum =

Genus of flowering plants

Titanotrichum is a genus of flowering plants belonging to the family Gesneriaceae.

It contains a single species, Titanotrichum oldhamii, a perennial or rhizomatous geophyte native to Fujian province of southeastern China, the southern Ryukyu Islands, and Taiwan.
