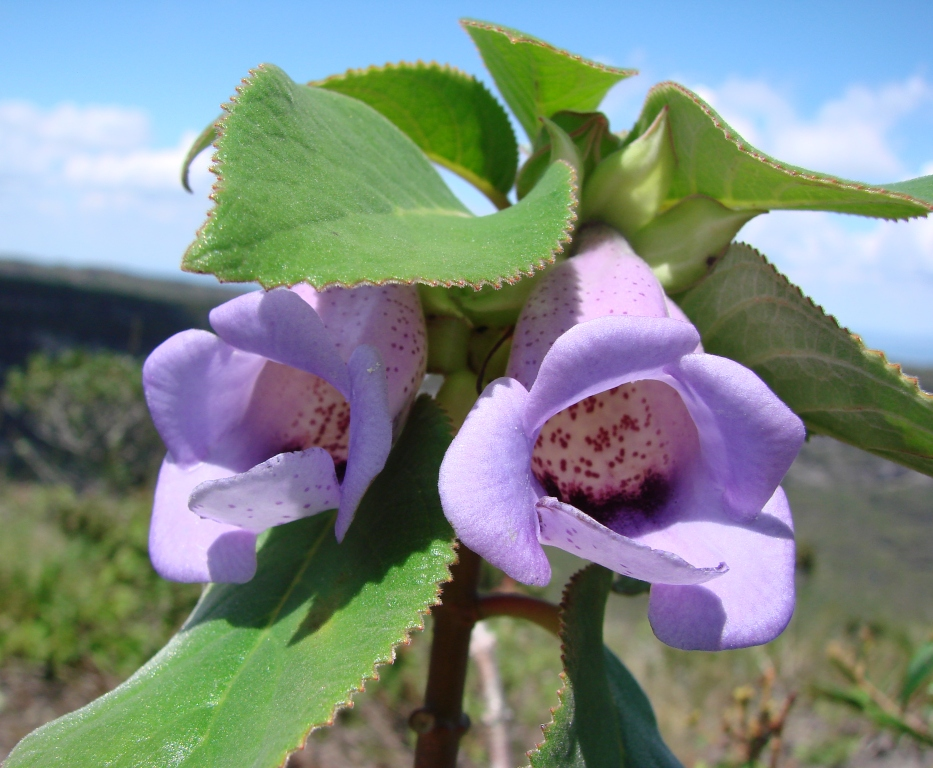

Scientific classification
- Kingdom: Plantae
- Clade: Tracheophytes
- Clade: Angiosperms
- Clade: Eudicots
- Clade: Asterids
- Order: Lamiales
- Family: Gesneriaceae
- Genus: Paliavana; Vell. ex Vand. (1788)

Synonyms
- Codonophora Lindl. (1827); Prasanthea Decne. (1848)

= Paliavana =

Genus of plants

Paliavana is a genus of flowering plants belonging to the family Gesneriaceae. It includes six species native to eastern Brazil.

== Species ==
There are 6 species assigned to this genus:

- Paliavana gracilis (Mart.) Chautems
- Paliavana plumerioides Chautems
- Paliavana prasinata (Ker Gawl.) Benth. & Hook.f.
- Paliavana sericiflora Benth. & Hook.f.
- Paliavana tenuiflora Mansf.
- Paliavana werdermannii Mansf.
