= Lampadaria =

Scientific classification
- Kingdom: Plantae
- Clade: Tracheophytes
- Clade: Angiosperms
- Clade: Eudicots
- Clade: Asterids
- Order: Lamiales
- Family: Gesneriaceae
- Genus: Lampadaria; Feuillet & L.E.Skog (2002 publ. 2003)
- Species: L. rupestris

Binomial name
- Lampadaria rupestris Feuillet & L.E.Skog (2002 publ. 2003)

Genus of plants

Lampadaria is a genus of flowering plants belonging to the family Gesneriaceae.

Its native range is Guyana.

Species:

- Lampadaria rupestris Feuillet & L.E.Skog
