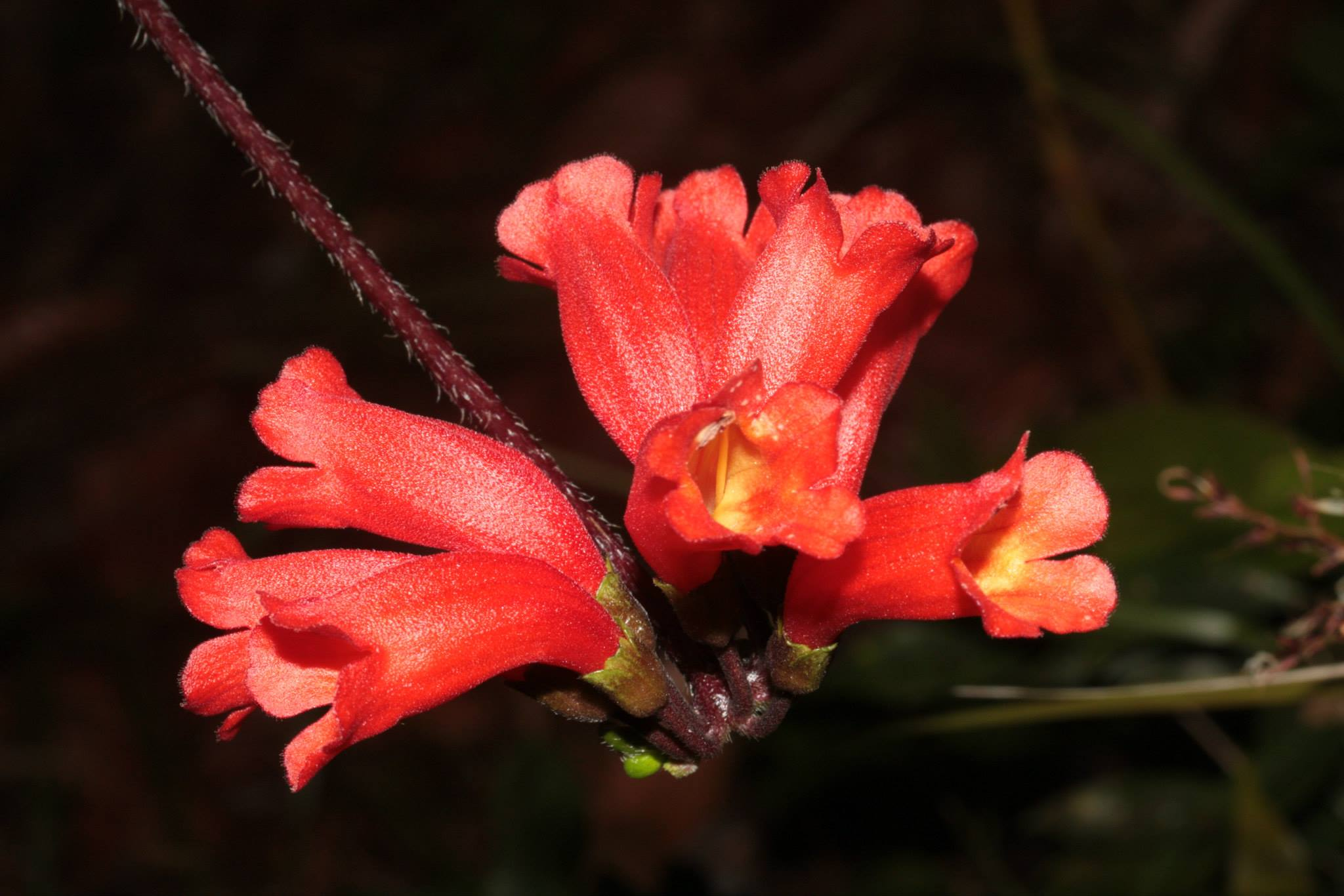
- Agalmyla chorisepala

Scientific classification
- Kingdom: Plantae
- Clade: Tracheophytes
- Clade: Angiosperms
- Clade: Eudicots
- Clade: Asterids
- Order: Lamiales
- Family: Gesneriaceae
- Genus: Agalmyla; Blume

Species
- See text.

Synonyms
- Chalmersia F.Muell. ex S.Moore; Dichrotrichum Reinw. ex de Vriese; Orithalia Blume; Orythia Endl.; Tetradema Schltr.; Tromsdorffia R.Br.

= Agalmyla =

Genus of flowering plants

Agalmyla is a genus of plants in the family Gesneriaceae.

== Species ==
As of April 2021, Plants of the World Online accepted the following species:

- Agalmyla affinis Hilliard & B.L.Burtt
- Agalmyla aitinyuensis Hilliard & B.L.Burtt
- Agalmyla ambonica Hilliard & B.L.Burtt
- Agalmyla angiensis (Kaneh. & Hatus.) Hilliard & B.L.Burtt
- Agalmyla angustifolia Miq.
- Agalmyla aurantiaca Hilliard & B.L.Burtt
- Agalmyla beccarii C.B.Clarke
- Agalmyla bicolor Hilliard & B.L.Burtt
- Agalmyla biflora (Elmer) Hilliard & B.L.Burtt
- Agalmyla bilirana Hilliard & B.L.Burtt
- Agalmyla borneensis (Schltr.) B.L.Burtt
- Agalmyla bracteata (Stapf) B.L.Burtt
- Agalmyla brevifolia S.Moore
- Agalmyla brevipes (C.B.Clarke) B.L.Burtt
- Agalmyla brownii (Koord.) B.L.Burtt
- Agalmyla calelanensis (Elmer) Hilliard & B.L.Burtt
- Agalmyla centralis Hilliard & B.L.Burtt
- Agalmyla chalmersii (F.Muell.) B.L.Burtt
- Agalmyla chorisepala (C.B.Clarke) Hilliard & B.L.Burtt
- Agalmyla chrysostyla (Schltr.) Hilliard & B.L.Burtt
- Agalmyla clarkei (Elmer) B.L.Burtt
- Agalmyla columneoides Hilliard & B.L.Burtt
- Agalmyla decipiens Hilliard & B.L.Burtt
- Agalmyla dentatisepala Hilliard & B.L.Burtt
- Agalmyla diandra Hilliard & B.L.Burtt
- Agalmyla elegans (K.Schum. & Lauterb.) Hilliard & B.L.Burtt
- Agalmyla elongata (Blume) B.L.Burtt
- Agalmyla erecta B.L.Burtt
- Agalmyla exannulata Hilliard & B.L.Burtt
- Agalmyla formosa Hilliard & B.L.Burtt
- Agalmyla gjellerupii (Schltr.) Hilliard & B.L.Burtt
- Agalmyla glabra (Copel. ex Merr.) Hilliard & B.L.Burtt
- Agalmyla glabrisepala Hilliard & B.L.Burtt
- Agalmyla glandulosa Hilliard & B.L.Burtt
- Agalmyla gracilis Hilliard & B.L.Burtt
- Agalmyla hilliardiae D.J.Middleton & S.M.Scott
- Agalmyla hirta Hilliard & B.L.Burtt
- Agalmyla hooglenii Hilliard & B.L.Burtt
- Agalmyla immersinervia Hilliard
- Agalmyla inaequidentata Hilliard & B.L.Burtt
- Agalmyla insularis Hilliard & B.L.Burtt
- Agalmyla javanica Hilliard & B.L.Burtt
- Agalmyla johannis-winkleri (Kraenzl.) B.L.Burtt
- Agalmyla keysseri (Diels) Hilliard & B.L.Burtt
- Agalmyla kowapiana Hilliard & B.L.Burtt
- Agalmyla lavandulacea Hilliard & B.L.Burtt
- Agalmyla leuserensis Hilliard & B.L.Burtt
- Agalmyla lobata (Schltr.) Hilliard & B.L.Burtt
- Agalmyla longiattenuata Hilliard & B.L.Burtt
- Agalmyla longipetiolata Hilliard & B.L.Burtt
- Agalmyla macrocalyx Hilliard & B.L.Burtt
- Agalmyla macrocolon Hilliard & B.L.Burtt
- Agalmyla manuselae Hilliard & B.L.Burtt
- Agalmyla minor (K.Schum. & Lauterb.) Hilliard & B.L.Burtt
- Agalmyla montis-tomasii Hilliard & B.L.Burtt
- Agalmyla multiflora (Kaneh. & Hatus.) Hilliard & B.L.Burtt
- Agalmyla murudiana Hilliard & B.L.Burtt
- Agalmyla nervosa Hilliard & B.L.Burtt
- Agalmyla obiana Hilliard & B.L.Burtt
- Agalmyla ovata (B.L.Burtt) Hilliard & B.L.Burtt
- Agalmyla parasitica (Lam.) Kuntze
- Agalmyla paromoia Hilliard & B.L.Burtt
- Agalmyla parvifolia (S.Moore) Hilliard & B.L.Burtt
- Agalmyla parvilimba Hilliard & B.L.Burtt
- Agalmyla pauciflora Hilliard & B.L.Burtt
- Agalmyla paucipilosa Hilliard & B.L.Burtt
- Agalmyla persimilis Hilliard & B.L.Burtt
- Agalmyla porrectiloba Hilliard & B.L.Burtt
- Agalmyla pseudoborneensis Hilliard & B.L.Burtt
- Agalmyla pulcherrima Hilliard & B.L.Burtt
- Agalmyla remotidentata Hilliard & B.L.Burtt
- Agalmyla roseoflava Hilliard & B.L.Burtt
- Agalmyla rotundiloba Hilliard & B.L.Burtt
- Agalmyla rubra (Merr.) B.L.Burtt
- Agalmyla samarica Hilliard & B.L.Burtt
- Agalmyla scabriflora Hilliard & B.L.Burtt
- Agalmyla schlechteri Hilliard & B.L.Burtt
- Agalmyla serrata Hilliard & B.L.Burtt
- Agalmyla sibuyanensis Hilliard & B.L.Burtt
- Agalmyla similis Hilliard & B.L.Burtt
- Agalmyla singularis Hilliard & B.L.Burtt
- Agalmyla sojoliana Hilliard & B.L.Burtt
- Agalmyla stellifera Hilliard & B.L.Burtt
- Agalmyla stenosiphon Hilliard & B.L.Burtt
- Agalmyla tamrauana Hilliard & B.L.Burtt
- Agalmyla tobensis Hilliard & B.L.Burtt
- Agalmyla torajiana Hilliard
- Agalmyla triflora (Valeton) B.L.Burtt
- Agalmyla tuberculata Hook.f.
- Agalmyla urdanetensis (Elmer) Hilliard & B.L.Burtt
- Agalmyla valetoniana (Lauterb.) Hilliard & B.L.Burtt
- Agalmyla villosa (Schltr.) Hilliard & B.L.Burtt
- Agalmyla vogelii Hilliard & B.L.Burtt
- Agalmyla wekariensis Hilliard & B.L.Burtt
- Agalmyla wildeorum Hilliard & B.L.Burtt
- Agalmyla wondiwoiana Hilliard & B.L.Burtt
