= Niphaea =

Scientific classification
- Kingdom: Plantae
- Clade: Tracheophytes
- Clade: Angiosperms
- Clade: Eudicots
- Clade: Asterids
- Order: Lamiales
- Family: Gesneriaceae
- Genus: Niphaea; Lindl. (1841)

Synonyms
- Meneghinia Vis. (1847), nom. illeg.

Genus of flowering plant

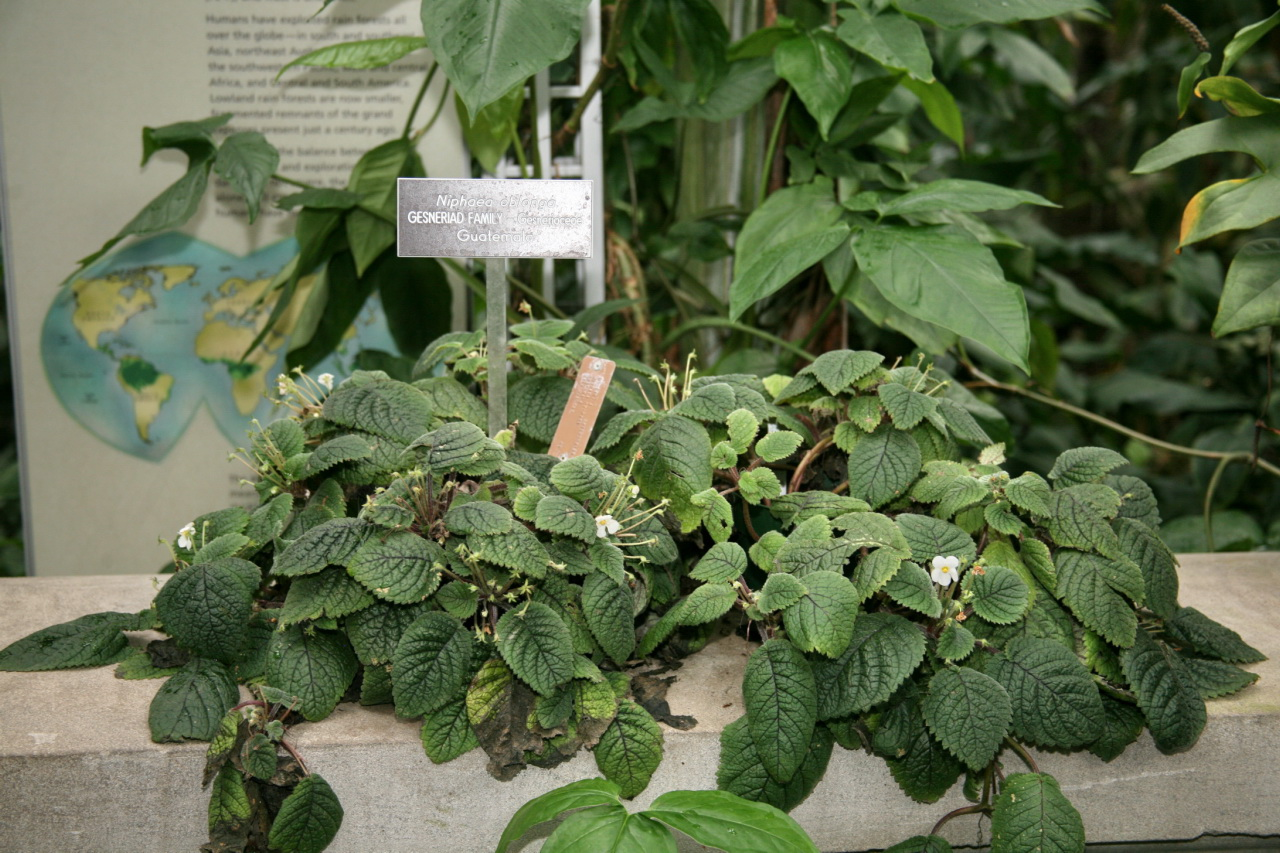
Niphaea oblonga

Niphaea is a genus of flowering plants belonging to the family Gesneriaceae.

Its native range is Mexico to Guatemala.

Species:

- Niphaea mexicana C.V.Morton
- Niphaea oblonga Lindl.
- Niphaea pumila Boggan & L.E.Skog
