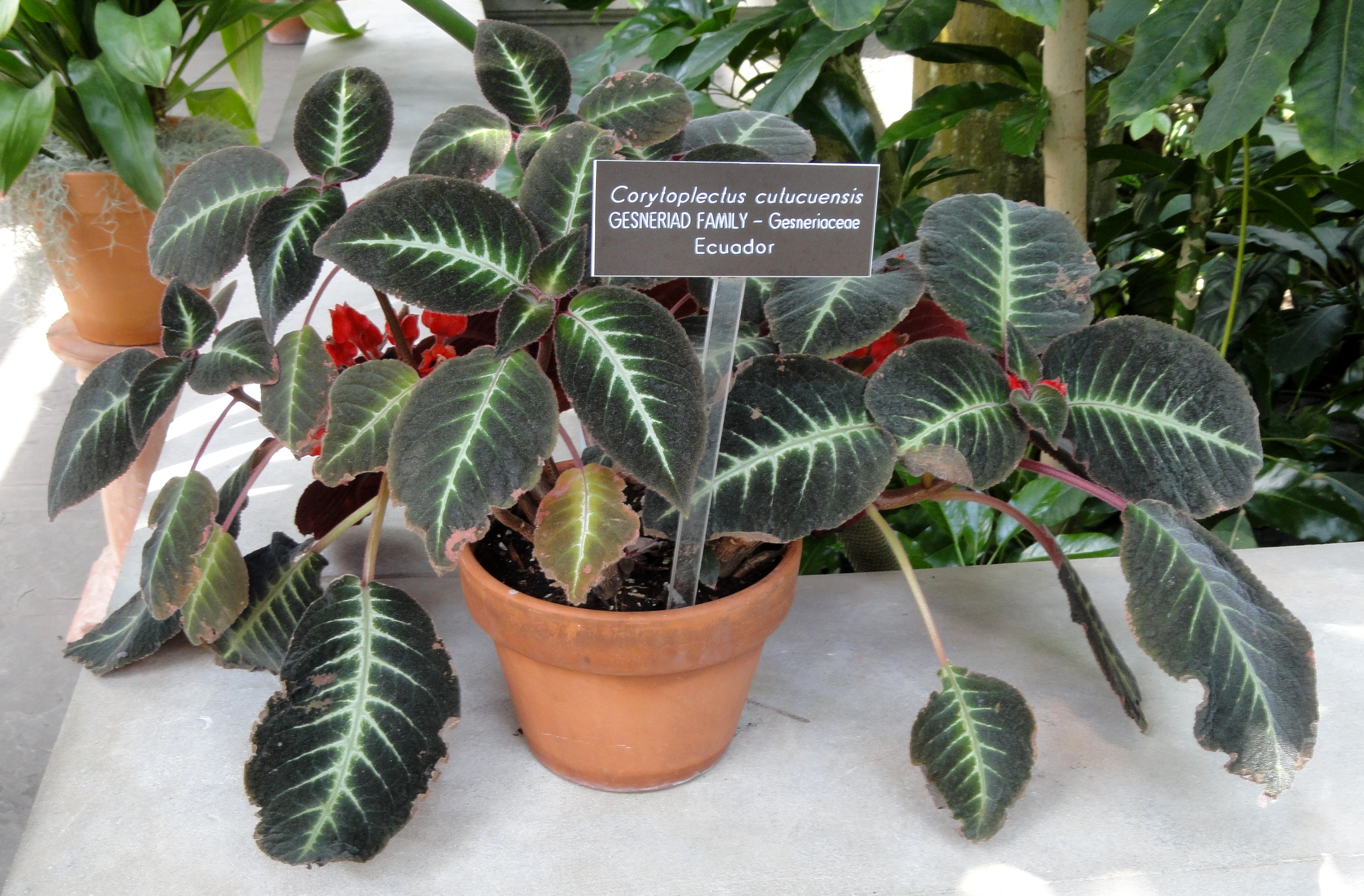
- Corytoplectus cutucuensis

Scientific classification
- Kingdom: Plantae
- Clade: Tracheophytes
- Clade: Angiosperms
- Clade: Eudicots
- Clade: Asterids
- Order: Lamiales
- Family: Gesneriaceae
- Genus: Corytoplectus; Oerst. (1858)

Type species
- Corytoplectus capitatus Wiehler

Species
- 12; see text

Synonyms
- Diplolegnon Rusby (1900)

= Corytoplectus =

Genus of flowering plants

Corytoplectus is a genus in the plant family Gesneriaceae. Plants from Corytoplectus are found in Bolivia, Brazil North, Colombia, Ecuador, Guyana, southwestern Mexico, Peru, Venezuela, in the cloud-forests of the high cordillera. The genus contains c. 12 species. The genus differs from the closely related Alloplectus in having an erect umbellate inflorescence and berries. The type species is C. capitatus.

== Description ==
Corytoplectus species are herbs or shrubs ranging from 0.5–2 m tall. The stems are erect and subquadrangular, but becoming quadrangular near the top. The fruit is a translucent berry with dark striate (with parallel longitudinal ridges or lines) seeds. The leaves have dark green upper surfaces with veins which are paler. The inflorescences are mostly erect.

== Etymology ==
According to Rodriques-Flores and Skog, Corytoplectus derives from the Latin coryto (leather pouch) and plectus (pleated or folded). They believe the name to be suitable, because, in profile, the calyces look like pleated leather pouches. However, an alternative view says that rather than deriving from the Latin coryto, the name derives from the Greek kōrys (helmet), giving "pleated helmet".

== Species ==
12 species are accepted.

- Corytoplectus capitatus (Hook.) Wiehler
- Corytoplectus congestus (Linden ex Hanst.) Wiehler
- Corytoplectus cutucuensis Wiehler
- Corytoplectus deltoideus (C.V.Morton) Wiehler
- Corytoplectus grandifolius (Britton ex Rusby) Rodr.-Flores & L.E.Skog
- Corytoplectus longipedunculatus Rodr.-Flores & L.E.Skog
- Corytoplectus oaxacensis Ram.-Roa, C.Chávez & Rodr.-Flores
- Corytoplectus purpuratus Rodr.-Flores & L.E.Skog
- Corytoplectus riceanus (Rusby) Wiehler
- Corytoplectus schlimii (Planch. & Linden) Wiehler
- Corytoplectus speciosus (Poepp.) Wiehler
- Corytoplectus zamorensis (Linden & André) Rodr.-Flores & L.E.Skog
