= Sphaerorrhiza =

Scientific classification
- Kingdom: Plantae
- Clade: Tracheophytes
- Clade: Angiosperms
- Clade: Eudicots
- Clade: Asterids
- Order: Lamiales
- Family: Gesneriaceae
- Genus: Sphaerorrhiza; Roalson & Boggan (2005)

Genus of plants

Sphaerorrhiza is a genus of flowering plants belonging to the family Gesneriaceae.

Its native range is Brazil.

== Species ==
Species:

- Sphaerorrhiza burchellii (S.M.Phillips) Roalson & Boggan
- Sphaerorrhiza rosulata A.O.Araujo & Chautems
- Sphaerorrhiza sarmentiana (Gardner ex Hook.) Roalson & Boggan
- Sphaerorrhiza serrata A.O.Araujo & Chautems
