= Bopopia =

Scientific classification
- Kingdom: Plantae
- Clade: Tracheophytes
- Clade: Angiosperms
- Clade: Eudicots
- Clade: Asterids
- Order: Lamiales
- Family: Gesneriaceae
- Genus: Bopopia; Munzinger & J.R.Morel (2021)
- Species: B. parviflora

Binomial name
- Bopopia parviflora Munzinger & J.R.Morel (2021)

Genus of flowering plants

Bopopia parviflora is a species of flowering plant in the family Gesneriaceae. It is the sole species in genus Bopopia. It is endemic to New Caledonia.
