= Coronanthera =

Scientific classification
- Kingdom: Plantae
- Clade: Tracheophytes
- Clade: Angiosperms
- Clade: Eudicots
- Clade: Asterids
- Order: Lamiales
- Family: Gesneriaceae
- Genus: Coronanthera; Vieill. ex C.B.Clarke

Genus of flowering plants

Coronanthera is a genus of shrubs in the family Gesneriaceae. The genus is found in New Caledonia and Solomon Islands in the Pacific and contains c. 10 species

== List of species ==
- Coronanthera aspera - New Caledonia
- Coronanthera barbata - New Caledonia
- Coronanthera clarkeana - New Caledonia
- Coronanthera deltoidifolia - New Caledonia
- Coronanthera grandis - Solomon Islands
- Coronanthera pancheri - New Caledonia
- Coronanthera pedunculosa - New Caledonia
- Coronanthera pinguior - New Caledonia
- Coronanthera pulchra - New Caledonia
- Coronanthera sericea - New Caledonia
- Coronanthera squamata - New Caledonia
