= Cremersia platula =

Scientific classification
- Kingdom: Plantae
- Clade: Tracheophytes
- Clade: Angiosperms
- Clade: Eudicots
- Clade: Asterids
- Order: Lamiales
- Family: Gesneriaceae
- Genus: Cremersia; Feuillet & L.E.Skog (2002 publ. 2003)
- Species: C. platula

Binomial name
- Cremersia platula Feuillet & L.E.Skog (2002 publ. 2003)

Species of flowering plant

Cremersia platula is a species of flowering plant in the family Gesneriaceae. It is endemic to French Guiana. It is the sole species in genus Cremersia.
