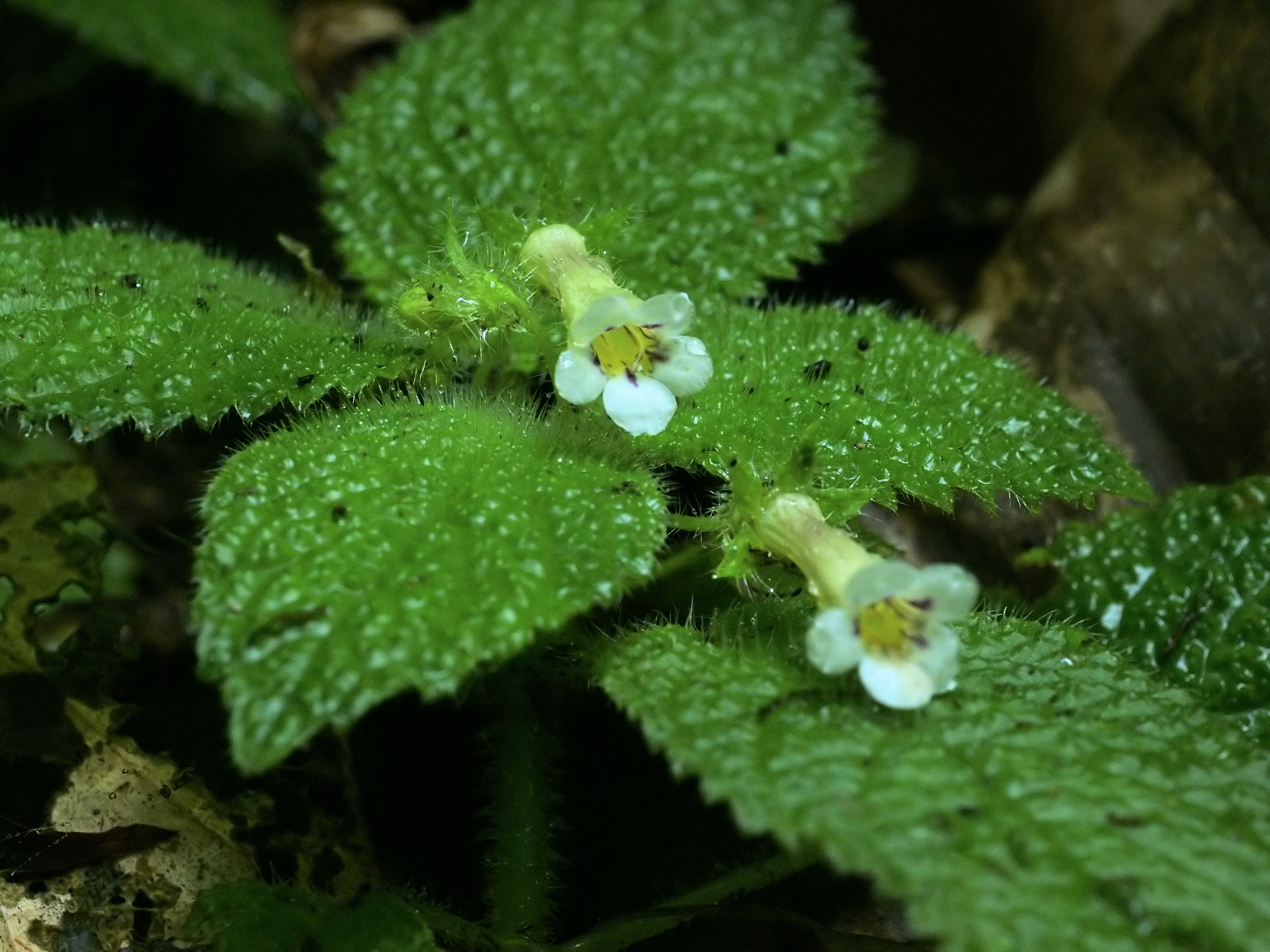
- Diastema affine

Scientific classification
- Kingdom: Plantae
- Clade: Tracheophytes
- Clade: Angiosperms
- Clade: Eudicots
- Clade: Asterids
- Order: Lamiales
- Family: Gesneriaceae
- Genus: Diastema; Benth. (1845)

Type species
- Diastema racemiferum Benth.

Species
- 20; see text

Synonyms
- Diastemation Müll.Berol. (1858); Diastemella Oerst. (1861)

= Diastema (plant) =

Genus of flowering plants

Diastema is a genus of flowering plants in the family Gesneriaceae. It contains approximately 20 species ranging from Mexico to Bolivia and Venezuela.

== Species ==
20 species are accepted.

- Diastema affine Fritsch
- Diastema comiferum (DC.) Benth. ex Walp.
- Diastema eggersianum Fritsch
- Diastema fimbratilobum Moonlight & J.L.Clark
- Diastema gymnoleucum Gilli
- Diastema hispidum (DC.) Fritsch
- Diastema incisum Benth.
- Diastema kalbreyeri Fritsch
- Diastema latiflorum Rusby
- Diastema maculatum (Poepp.) Benth. ex Walp.
- Diastema purpurascens Rusby
- Diastema racemiferum Benth.
- Diastema rupestre Brandegee
- Diastema scabrum (Poepp.) Benth. ex Walp.
- Diastema sodiroanum Fritsch
- Diastema tenerrimum (Poepp.) Benth. ex Walp.
- Diastema urticifolium (Poepp.) Benth. ex Walp.
- Diastema vexans H.E.Moore
- Diastema weberbaueri Fitsch
- Diastema williamsii Rusby
