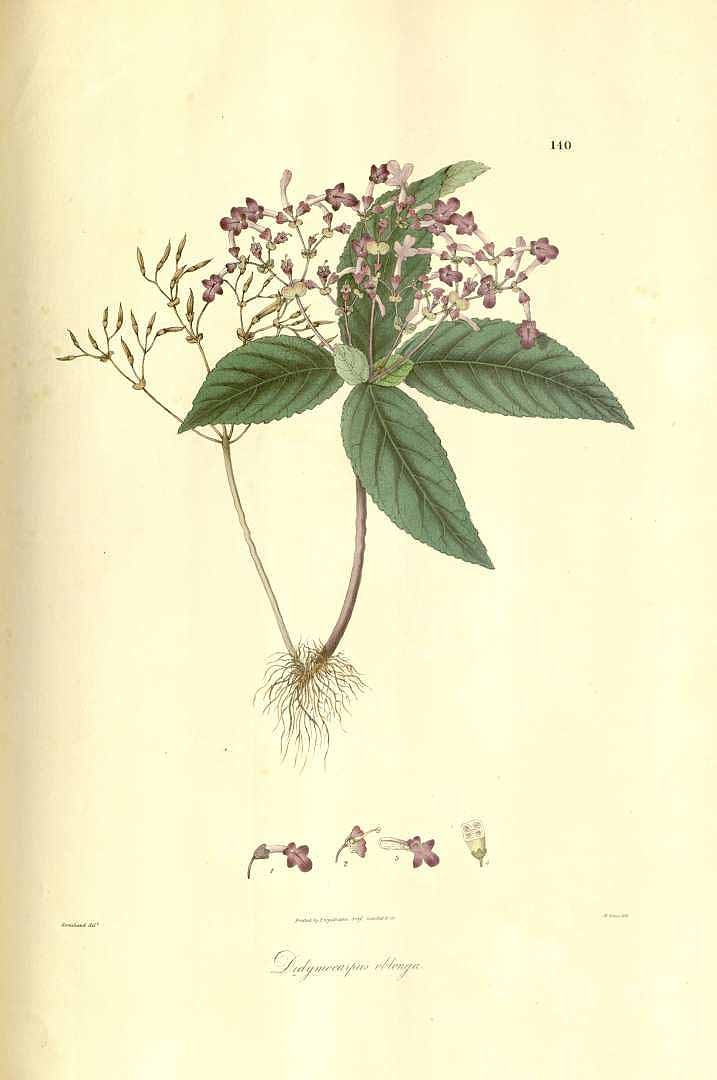
- Didymocarpus oblongus

Scientific classification
- Kingdom: Plantae
- Clade: Tracheophytes
- Clade: Angiosperms
- Clade: Eudicots
- Clade: Asterids
- Order: Lamiales
- Family: Gesneriaceae
- Subfamily: Didymocarpoideae
- Genus: Didymocarpus; Wall. (1819)

Species
- 110; see text

Synonyms
- Roettlera Vahl (1804); Rottlera Vahl (1804), orth. var.

= Didymocarpus =

Genus of plants found in Asia

Didymocarpus (from Ancient Greek δίδυμος (dídumos), meaning "twin", and καρπός (karpós), meaning "fruit") is a genus of flowering plants in the family Gesneriaceae and typical of the tribe Didymocarpeae. There are about 100 known species distributed in India, Nepal, Bhutan, Myanmar, southern China, Vietnam, Laos, Cambodia, Thailand, and the Malay Peninsula, with one species extending up to northern Sumatra. Some members of the genus are known for their medicinal properties, especially to cure diseases related to the kidneys.

== Description ==
The members of the genus are typically small perennial, deciduous herbs with annual flowering stems. Flowering shoots are produced from the basal rootstock or condensed rhizome during the onset of rainy season which dies after producing the fruits. Leaves are opposite, decussate and mostly unequal within pairs. The inflorescence is pair-flowered cyme, typical of the Gesneriad family, with few to many flowers. The calyx is often united for more than half of its length or rarely free to the base. The corolla is tubular, widening towards the mouth with a bilabiate limbs. The flowers are devoid of nectar are subtended by brightly colored bracteoles. Floral color can be hues of reds, oranges, yellows, and violet often with stripes on the lobes. The flower has two stamens with slender filaments and cohering anthers. The ovary is cylindrical with often with stipe and an entirely capitate stigma. Fruit capsules are straight, orthocarpic, bivalved, and dehisce loculicidally.

== Taxonomy ==
The genus Didymocarpus was described by Nathaniel Wallich in 1819 based on specimens he received from Nepal. Due to lack of a clear definition of the generic boundaries, more than 180 species and 450 names were affiliated to this genus over time. These included many morphologically distinct species from Madagascar, Western Ghats of India and Southeast Asia. The genus was remodeled and redefined by Weber and Burt in 1998 with about 80 species. Recently, many new species were described from India, China and Thailand and the genus now comprises about 100 species.

== Species ==
110 species are accepted.

- Didymocarpus acuminatus R.Br.
- Didymocarpus adenocalyx W.T.Wang
- Didymocarpus adenocarpus C.E.C.Fisch.
- Didymocarpus albicalyx C.B.Clarke
- Didymocarpus albiflorus Souvann. & Phonep.
- Didymocarpus andersonii C.B.Clarke
- Didymocarpus angustiflorus Souvann. & Lanors.
- Didymocarpus anningensis Y.M.Shui, Lei Cai & J.Cai
- Didymocarpus antirrhinoides A.Weber
- Didymocarpus aromaticus D.Don
- Didymocarpus aurantiacus C.B.Clarke
- Didymocarpus aureoglandulosus C.B.Clarke
- Didymocarpus barbinervius C.B.Clarke
- Didymocarpus bhutanicus W.T.Wang
- Didymocarpus bicolor Craib
- Didymocarpus biserratus Barnett
- Didymocarpus bolavenensis Souvann., Soulad. & Phonep.
- Didymocarpus bracteatus MacGregor & W.W.Sm.
- Didymocarpus brevicalyx Nangngam & D.J.Middleton
- Didymocarpus brevipedunculatus Y.H.Tan & Bin Yang
- Didymocarpus burkei W.W.Sm.
- Didymocarpus cinereus D.Don
- Didymocarpus citrinus Ridl.
- Didymocarpus corchorifolius Wall. ex A.DC.
- Didymocarpus cordatus Wall. ex A.DC.
- Didymocarpus cordifolius P.W.Li & Li H.Yang
- Didymocarpus cortusifolius (Hance) H.Lév.
- Didymocarpus curvicapsa Hilliard
- Didymocarpus dalatensis D.J.Middleton
- Didymocarpus denticulatus W.T.Wang
- Didymocarpus dissectus F.Wen, Y.L.Qiu, Jie Huang & Y.G.Wei
- Didymocarpus dongrakensis B.L.Burtt
- Didymocarpus elatior Prain
- Didymocarpus epithemoides B.L.Burtt
- Didymocarpus formosus Nangngam & D.J.Middleton
- Didymocarpus gageanus W.W.Sm.
- Didymocarpus geesinkianus B.L.Burtt
- Didymocarpus glandulosus (W.W.Sm.) W.T.Wang
- Didymocarpus graciliflorus MacGregor & W.W.Sm.
- Didymocarpus grandidentatus (W.T.Wang) W.T.Wang
- Didymocarpus heucherifolius Hand.-Mazz.
- Didymocarpus hookeri C.B.Clarke
- Didymocarpus inflatus J.F.Maxwell & Nangngam
- Didymocarpus insulsus Craib
- Didymocarpus jaesonensis Nangngam & J.F.Maxwell
- Didymocarpus kasinii Nangngam & D.J.Middleton
- Didymocarpus kerrii Craib
- Didymocarpus laoticus Souvann. & Lanors.
- Didymocarpus leiboensis Z.P.Soong & W.T.Wang
- Didymocarpus lineicapsa (C.E.C.Fisch.) B.L.Burtt
- Didymocarpus lobulatus F.Wen, Xin Hong & W.Y.Xie
- Didymocarpus longicalyx G.W.Hu & Q.F.Wang
- Didymocarpus macrophyllus Wall. ex D.Don
- Didymocarpus margaritae W.W.Sm.
- Didymocarpus medogensis W.T.Wang
- Didymocarpus megaphyllus Barnett
- Didymocarpus mengtze W.W.Sm.
- Didymocarpus middletonii Souvann., Soulad. & Tagane
- Didymocarpus moellerii A.Joe, Hareesh & M.Sabu
- Didymocarpus mollis Wall. ex C.B.Clarke
- Didymocarpus mortonii C.B.Clarke
- Didymocarpus nanophyton C.Y.Wu ex H.W.Li
- Didymocarpus nepalensis Bh.Adhikari & Mich.Möller
- Didymocarpus newmannii B.L.Burtt.
- Didymocarpus oblongus Wall. ex D.Don
- Didymocarpus ovatus Barnett
- Didymocarpus parryorum C.E.C.Fisch.
- Didymocarpus pauciflorus Nangngam & D.J.Middleton
- Didymocarpus paucinervius C.B.Clarke
- Didymocarpus payapensis Nangngam & J.F.Maxwell
- Didymocarpus pedicellatus R.Br.
- Didymocarpus phuquocensis N.S.Lý, T.L.Tran & N.G.Cao
- Didymocarpus platycalyx C.B.Clarke
- Didymocarpus podocarpus C.B.Clarke
- Didymocarpus poilanei Pellegr.
- Didymocarpus praeteritus B.L.Burtt & R.A.Davidson
- Didymocarpus primulifolius D.Don
- Didymocarpus pseudomengtze W.T.Wang
- Didymocarpus pteronema B.L.Burtt
- Didymocarpus puhoatensis Xin Hong & F.Wen
- Didymocarpus punduanus Wall. ex R.Br.
- Didymocarpus purpureobracteatus W.W.Sm.
- Didymocarpus purpureopictus Craib
- Didymocarpus purpureus Ridl.
- Didymocarpus pygmaeus C.B.Clarke
- Didymocarpus reniformis W.T.Wang
- Didymocarpus robustus Ridl.
- Didymocarpus rufipes C.B.Clarke
- Didymocarpus salviiflorus Chun
- Didymocarpus silvarum W.W.Sm.
- Didymocarpus sinoindicus N.S.Prasanna, Lei Cai & V.Gowda
- Didymocarpus sinoprimulinus W.T.Wang
- Didymocarpus stenanthos C.B.Clarke
- Didymocarpus stenocarpus W.T.Wang
- Didymocarpus sulphureus Ridl.
- Didymocarpus tamdaoensis D.J.Middleton
- Didymocarpus tonghaiensis J.M.Li & F.S.Wang
- Didymocarpus tribounii Nangngam & D.J.Middleton
- Didymocarpus trilobus Souvann. & Phonep.
- Didymocarpus triplotrichus Hilliard
- Didymocarpus tristis Craib
- Didymocarpus vickifunkiae V.Gowda & N.S.Prasanna
- Didymocarpus villosus D.Don
- Didymocarpus violaceus Ridl.
- Didymocarpus wattianus Craib
- Didymocarpus wengeri C.E.C.Fisch.
- Didymocarpus yuenlingensis W.T.Wang
- Didymocarpus yunnanensis (Franch.) W.W.Sm.
- Didymocarpus zhenkangensis W.T.Wang
- Didymocarpus zhufengensis W.T.Wang
