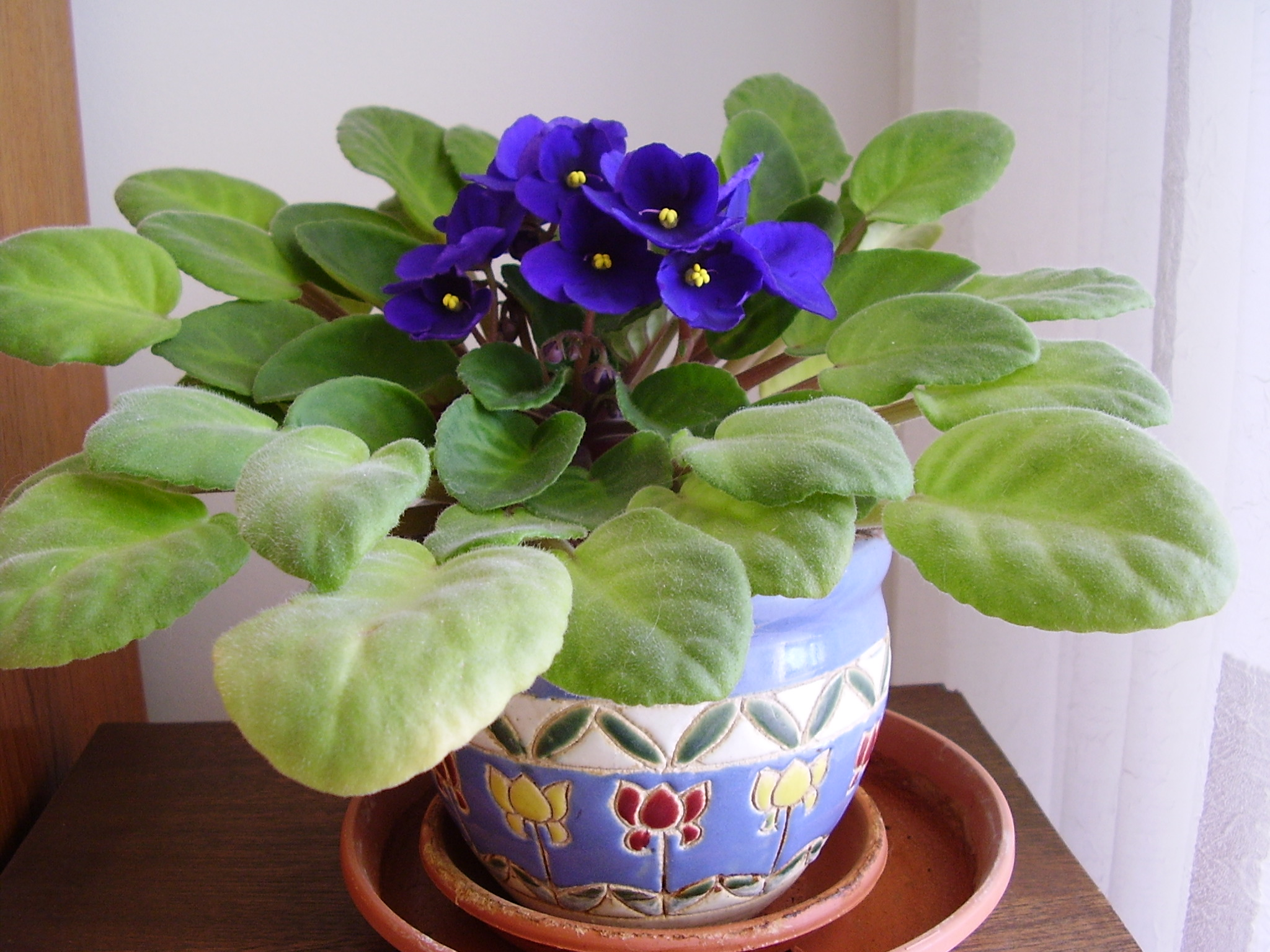
- Streptocarpus ionanthus (an African violet) - a common household plant and a member of the family

Scientific classification
- Kingdom: Plantae
- Clade: Tracheophytes
- Clade: Angiosperms
- Clade: Eudicots
- Clade: Asterids
- Order: Lamiales
- Family: Gesneriaceae; Rich. & Juss. in DC, nom. cons.

Subfamilies
- See text.

= Gesneriaceae =

Family of flowering plants including African violets

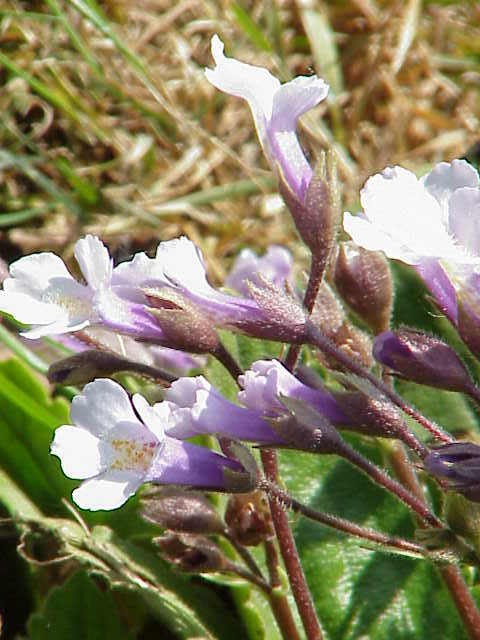
Haberlea rhodopensis flowers

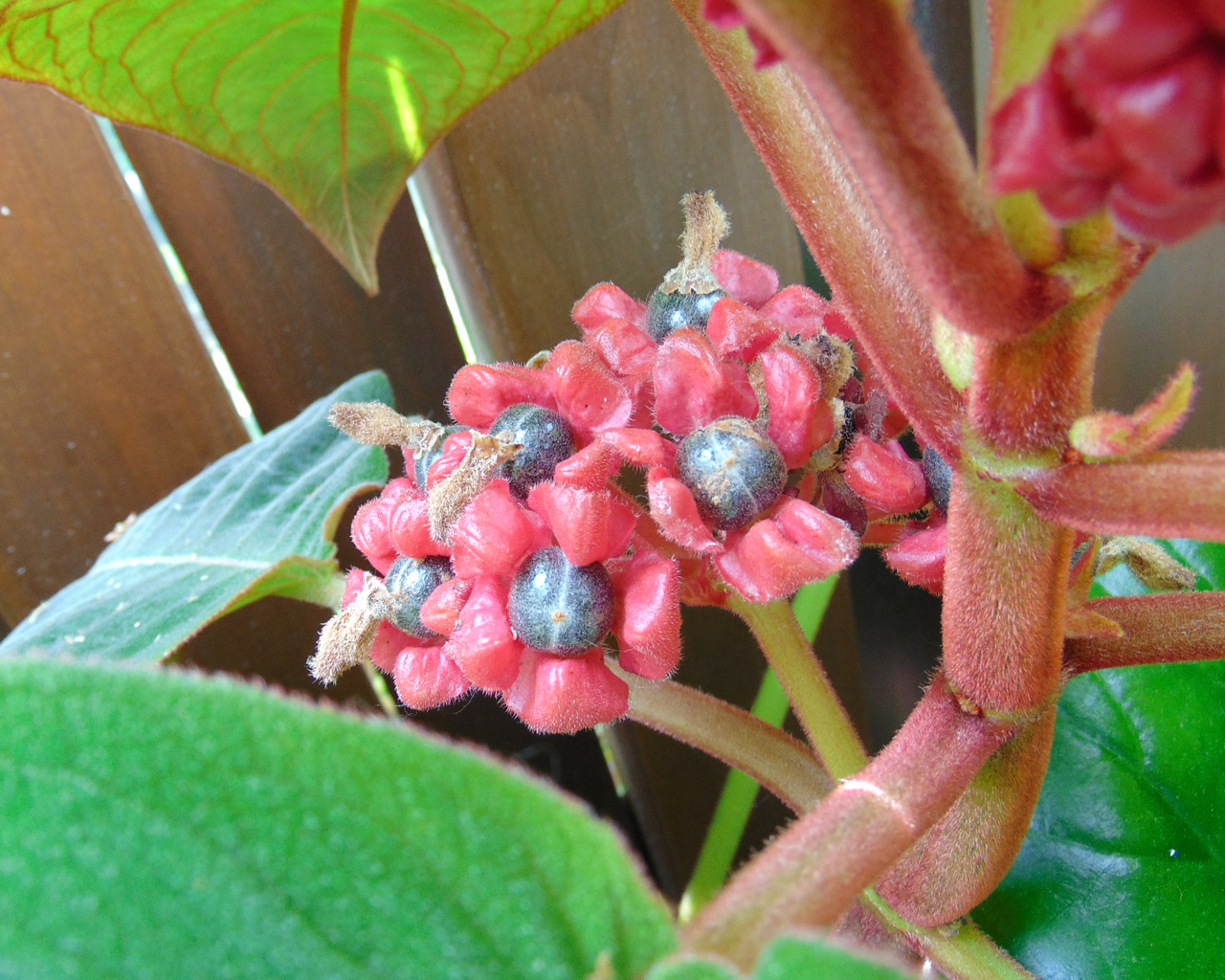
Corytoplectus capitatus is a large plant with fruit that are black berries.

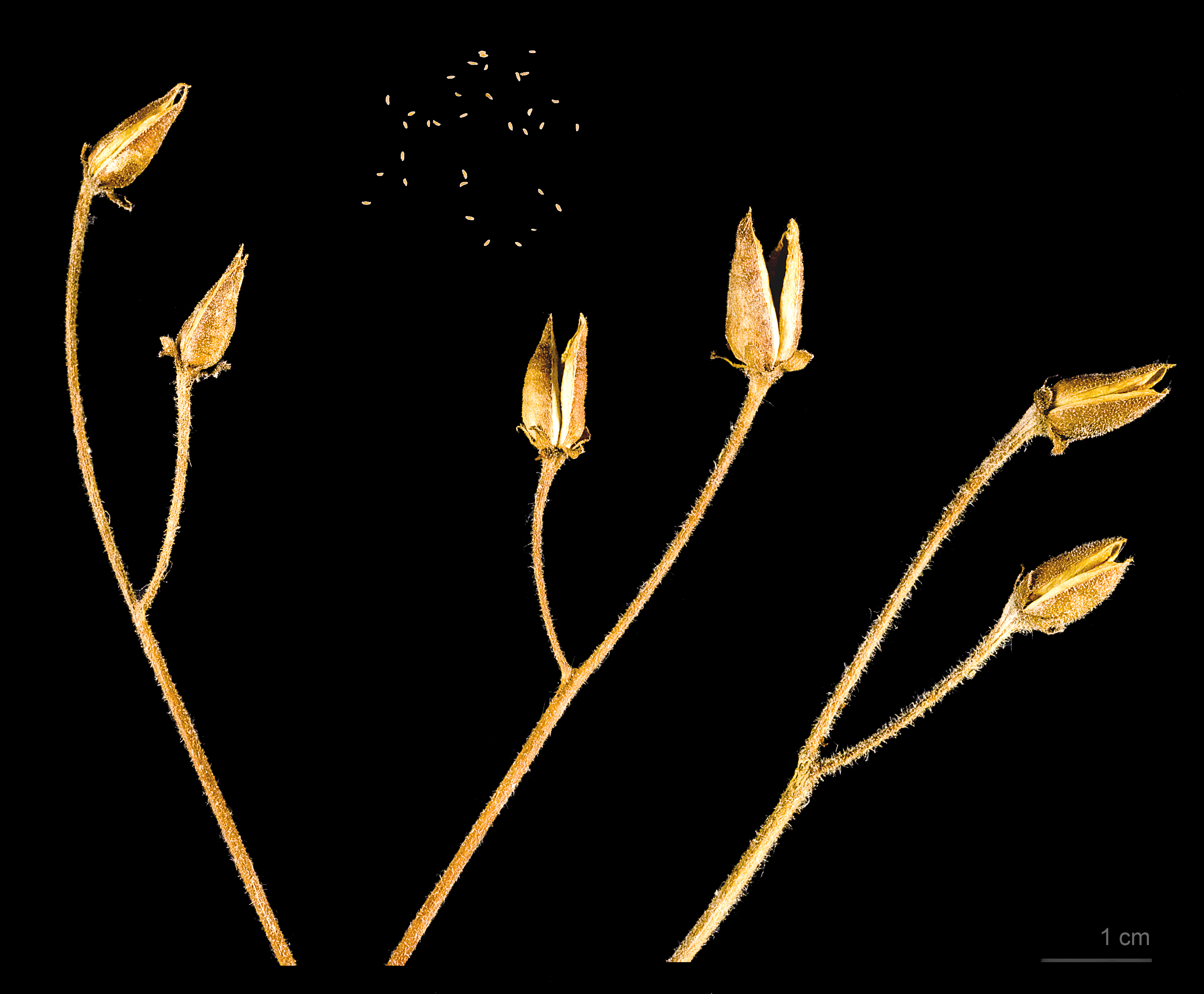
Ramonda myconi fruit are dry dehiscent capsules.

Gesneriaceae, the gesneriad family, is a family of flowering plants consisting of about 152 genera and ca. 3,540 species in the tropics and subtropics of the Old World (almost all Didymocarpoideae) and the New World (most Gesnerioideae), with a very small number extending to temperate areas. Many species have colorful and showy flowers and are cultivated as ornamental plants.

== Etymology ==
The family name is based on the genus Gesneria, which honours Swiss naturalist and humanist Conrad Gessner.

== Description ==
Most species are herbaceous perennials or subshrubs but a few are woody shrubs or small trees. The phyllotaxy is usually opposite and decussate, but leaves have a spiral or alternate arrangement in some groups. As with other members of the Lamiales the flowers have a (usually) zygomorphic corolla whose petals are fused into a tube and there is no one character that separates a gesneriad from any other member of Lamiales. Gesneriads differ from related families of the Lamiales in having an unusual inflorescence structure, the "pair-flowered cyme", but some gesneriads lack this characteristic, and some other Lamiales (Calceolariaceae and some Scrophulariaceae) share it. The ovary can be superior, half-inferior or fully inferior, and the fruit a dry or fleshy capsule or a berry. The seeds are always small and numerous. Gesneriaceae have traditionally been separated from Scrophulariaceae by having a unilocular rather than bilocular ovary, with parietal rather than axile placentation.

== Taxonomy ==
"Gesneriaceae" is a conserved name (nom. cons.), meaning that although alternative, less well used names for the family were published earlier, the International Code of Nomenclature for algae, fungi, and plants specifies this as the name to be used. It was published by Louis Claude Richard and Antoine Laurent de Jussieu in 1816. In 1829, Barthélemy Dumortier divided the family into two tribes, based on the number of stamens. However, the only genus he placed in his two-stamen tribe, Columellia, is now placed in the separate family Columelliaceae. Dumortier's publication has been treated as the first for the family by some sources.

Botanists who have made significant contributions to the systematics of the family are George Bentham, Robert Brown, B.L. Burtt, C.B. Clarke, Olive Mary Hilliard, Joseph Dalton Hooker, William Jackson Hooker, Karl Fritsch, Elmer Drew Merrill, Harold E. Moore Jr., John L. Clark, Conrad Vernon Morton, Henry Nicholas Ridley, Laurence Skog, W.T. Wang, Anton Weber, and Hans Wiehler. The Gesneriad Society is an international horticultural society devoted to the promotion, cultivation, and study of Gesneriaceae.

=== Phylogeny ===
From about 1997 onwards, molecular phylogenetic studies led to extensive changes in the classification of the family Gesneriaceae and its genera, many of which have been re-circumscribed or synonymized. New species are still being discovered, particularly in Asia, and may further change generic boundaries. A consensus phylogeny used to build classifications of the family in 2013 and 2020 is shown below (to the level of tribes). The family Calceolariaceae is shown as the sister to Gesneriaceae.

- - Peltanthera
  - Calceolariaceae
  - - Gesneriaceae
      - Sanangoideae (Sanango)
      - - Gesnerioideae
          - Titanotricheae (Titanotrichum)
          - - Napeantheae (Napeanthus)
            - Beslerieae
          - - Coronanthereae
            - Gesnerieae
        - Didymocarpoideae
          - Epithemateae
          - Trichosporeae

A phylogenomic study published in 2021 which used 418 nuclear genes confirmed the monophyly of all the subfamilies and tribes. It resolved Peltanthera as sister to a clade of Calceolariaceae and Gesneriaceae. Within the Gesnerioideae, Napeantheae rather than Titanotricheae was found to be sister to the remaining tribes. The position of Titanotricheae varied according to the method used to build the cladogram, which the authors suggested was due to incomplete lineage sorting following rapid divergence. The phylogenetic position of Titanotrichum remains unsettled.

Concatenation-based

- Gesnerioideae
  - Napeantheae (Napeanthus)
  - - - Titanotricheae (Titanotrichum)
      - Beslerieae
    - - Coronanthereae
      - Gesnerieae

Coalescent-based

- Gesnerioideae
  - Napeantheae (Napeanthus)
  - - Beslerieae
    - - Titanotricheae (Titanotrichum)
      - - Coronanthereae
        - Gesnerieae

The genus Sanango has not always been included in Gesneriaceae. However, molecular phylogenetic studies published up to and including 2021 suggest that it does belong in the family as the most basal member, and it is placed in its own subfamily. The studies also show the genus Peltanthera to be outside the family, although some sources still place it within the Gesneriaceae. The genus Rehmannia has also sometimes been included in the family but is now referred to the family Orobanchaceae.

No single morphological feature absolutely divides two main subfamilies (i.e. forms a uniform synapomorphy). Gesnerioideae seedlings have normal cotyledons of the same size and shape (isocotylous). The cotyledons of Didymocarpoideae are usually, but not always, eventually different in size and shape (anisocotylous). One cotyledon ceases to grow and withers away, while the other continues to grow, and may even form a very large leaf that is the only one the plant has (Monophyllaea, some Streptocarpus). Gesnerioideae flowers usually have four fertile stamens, rarely two or five. Didymocarpoideae flowers usually have two fertile stamens, less often four, rarely one or five.

=== Subfamilies and genera ===
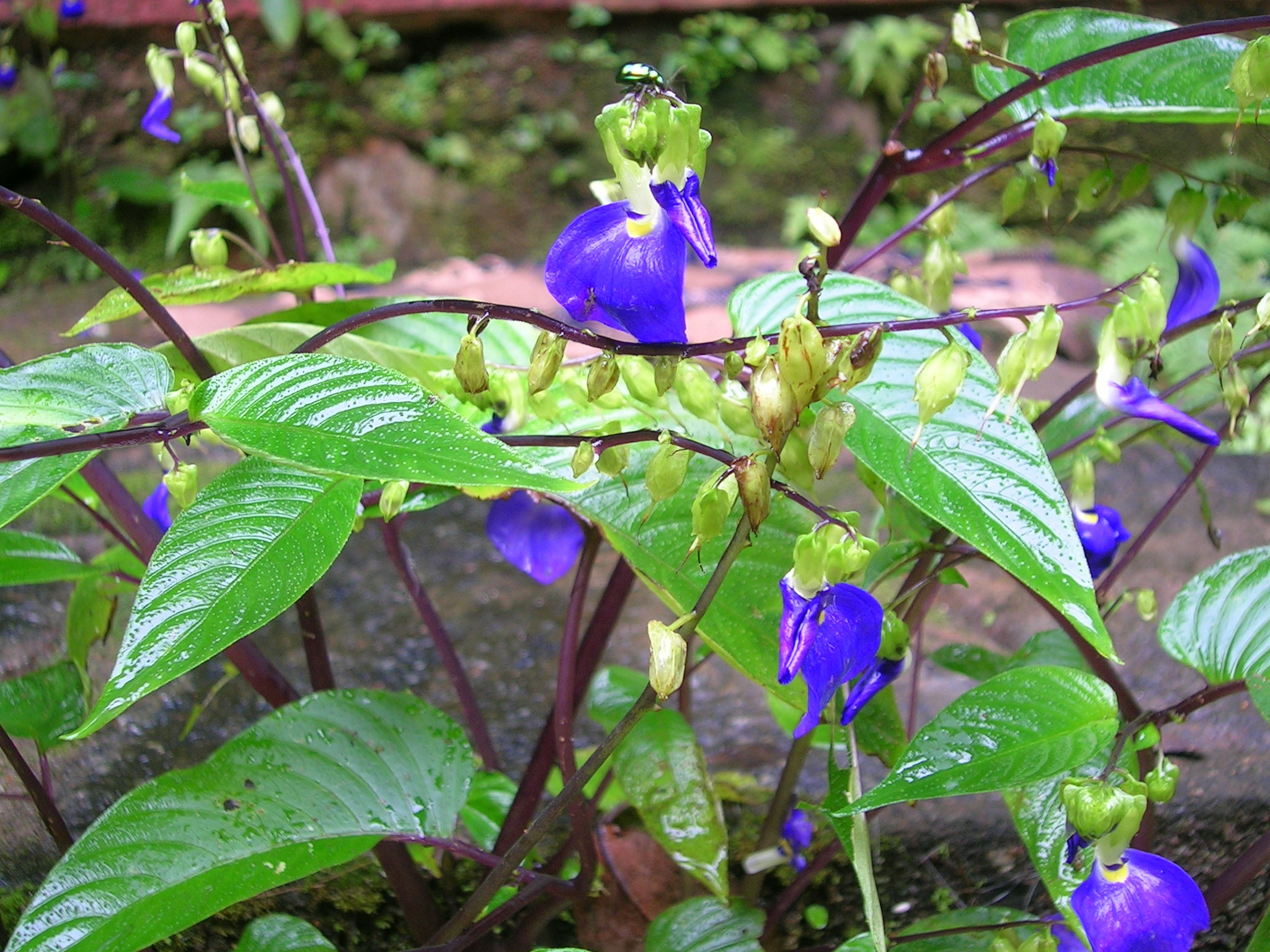
Rhynchoglossum notonianum

On the basis of molecular phylogenetic, morphological and biogeographical differences, the family has been divided into two major subfamilies: subfamily Didymocarpoideae (formerly Cyrtandroideae) with all but one species from the Old World, and subfamily Gesnerioideae native from the Americas west through the Pacific to Australia and southeastern China. The genus Sanango is placed in its own subfamily, Sanangoideae. The two main subfamilies are further divided into tribes and subtribes.

Genera accepted by Plants of the World Online (PoWO) as of October 2025 are listed below, together with their placement in a subfamily and tribe by Weber et al. (2020).

Gesneriaceae genera
Genus	Subfamily: Tribe
Achimenes P.Browne	Gesnerioideae: Gesnerieae
Aeschynanthus Jack	Didymocarpoideae: Trichosporeae
Agalmyla Blume	Didymocarpoideae: Trichosporeae
Alloplectus Mart. (synonym Cobananthus Wiehler)	Gesnerioideae: Gesnerieae
Allostigma W.T.Wang	Didymocarpoideae: Trichosporeae
Alsobia Hanst.	Gesnerioideae: Gesnerieae
Amalophyllon Brandegee	Gesnerioideae: Gesnerieae
Anetanthus Hiern ex Benth. & Hook.f.	Gesnerioideae: Beslerieae
Anna Pellegr.	Didymocarpoideae: Trichosporeae
Asteranthera Hanst.	Gesnerioideae: Coronanthereae
Beccarinda Kuntze	Didymocarpoideae: Trichosporeae
Bellonia L.	Gesnerioideae: Gesnerieae
Besleria Plum. ex L.	Gesnerioideae: Beslerieae
Billolivia D.J.Middleton	Didymocarpoideae: Trichosporeae
Boea Comm. ex Lam.	Didymocarpoideae: Trichosporeae
Boeica C.B.Clarke	Didymocarpoideae: Trichosporeae
Bopopia Munzinger & J.R.Morel	Gesnerioideae: Coronanthereae
Bournea Oliv.	Didymocarpoideae: Trichosporeae
Briggsiopsis K.Y.Pan	Didymocarpoideae: Trichosporeae
Cathayanthe Chun	Didymocarpoideae: Trichosporeae
Centrosolenia Benth.	Gesnerioideae: Gesnerieae
Championia Gardner	Didymocarpoideae: Trichosporeae
Chautemsia A.O.Araujo & V.C.Souza	Gesnerioideae: Gesnerieae
Chayamaritia D.J.Middleton & Mich.Möller	Didymocarpoideae: Trichosporeae
Christopheria J.F.Sm. & J.L.Clark	Gesnerioideae: Gesnerieae
Chrysothemis Decne.	Gesnerioideae: Gesnerieae
Codonanthe (Mart.) Hanst.	Gesnerioideae: Gesnerieae
Codonanthopsis Mansf.	Gesnerioideae: Gesnerieae
Codonoboea Ridl.	Didymocarpoideae: Trichosporeae
Columnea Plum. ex L.	Gesnerioideae: Gesnerieae
Conandron Siebold & Zucc.	Didymocarpoideae: Trichosporeae
Corallodiscus Batalin	Didymocarpoideae: Trichosporeae
Coronanthera Vieill. ex C.B.Clarke	Gesnerioideae: Coronanthereae
Corytoplectus Oerst.	Gesnerioideae: Gesnerieae
Crantzia Scop.	Gesnerioideae: Gesnerieae
Cremersia Feuillet & L.E.Skog	Gesnerioideae: Gesnerieae
Cremosperma Benth.	Gesnerioideae: Beslerieae
Cremospermopsis L.E.Skog & L.P.Kvist	Gesnerioideae: Beslerieae
Cubitanthus Barringer	
Cyrtandra J.R.Forst. & G.Forst.	Didymocarpoideae: Trichosporeae
Damrongia Kerr ex Craib	Didymocarpoideae: Trichosporeae
Depanthus S.Moore	Gesnerioideae: Coronanthereae
Diastema Benth.	Gesnerioideae: Gesnerieae
Didissandra C.B.Clarke	Didymocarpoideae: Trichosporeae
Didymocarpus Wall.	Didymocarpoideae: Trichosporeae
Didymostigma W.T.Wang	Didymocarpoideae: Trichosporeae
Dorcoceras Bunge	Didymocarpoideae: Trichosporeae
Drymonia Mart.	Gesnerioideae: Gesnerieae
Emarhendia Kiew, A.Weber & B.L.Burtt	Didymocarpoideae: Trichosporeae
Episcia Mart.	Gesnerioideae: Gesnerieae
Epithema Blume	Didymocarpoideae: Epithemateae
Eucodonia Hanst.	Gesnerioideae: Gesnerieae
Fieldia A.Cunn.	Gesnerioideae: Coronanthereae
Gasteranthus Benth.	Gesnerioideae: Beslerieae
Gesneria Plum. ex L.	Gesnerioideae: Gesnerieae
Glabrella Mich.Möller & W.H.Chen	Didymocarpoideae: Trichosporeae
Glossoloma Hanst.	Gesnerioideae: Gesnerieae
Gloxinella (H.E.Moore) Roalson & Boggan	Gesnerioideae: Gesnerieae
Gloxinia L'Hér.	Gesnerioideae: Gesnerieae
Gloxiniopsis Roalson & Boggan	Gesnerioideae: Gesnerieae
Goyazia Taub.	Gesnerioideae: Gesnerieae
× Goydirola A.O.Araujo & M.Peixoto (Goyazia × Mandirola)	Gesnerioideae: Gesnerieae
Gyrocheilos W.T.Wang	Didymocarpoideae: Trichosporeae
Gyrogyne W.T.Wang	Didymocarpoideae: Epithemateae
Haberlea Friv.	Didymocarpoideae: Trichosporeae
Hemiboea C.B.Clarke	Didymocarpoideae: Trichosporeae
Henckelia Spreng.	Didymocarpoideae: Trichosporeae
Heppiella Regel	Gesnerioideae: Gesnerieae
Hequnia Yin Z.Wang & F.P.Liu	
Hexatheca C.B.Clarke	Didymocarpoideae: Trichosporeae
Jerdonia Wight	Didymocarpoideae: Trichosporeae
Kaisupeea B.L.Burtt	Didymocarpoideae: Trichosporeae
Kohleria Regel	Gesnerioideae: Gesnerieae
Lampadaria Feuillet & L.E.Skog	Gesnerioideae: Gesnerieae
Langbiangia Luu, C.L.Hsieh & K.F.Chung	Didymocarpoideae: Trichosporeae: Didymocarpinae
Lembocarpus Leeuwenb.	Gesnerioideae: Gesnerieae
Lenbrassia G.W.Gillett	Gesnerioideae: Coronanthereae
Leptoboea Benth.	Didymocarpoideae: Trichosporeae
Lesia J.L.Clark & J.F.Sm.	Gesnerioideae: Gesnerieae
Liebigia Endl.	Didymocarpoideae: Trichosporeae
Litostigma Y.G.Wei, F.Wen & Mich.Möller	Didymocarpoideae: Trichosporeae
Loxocarpus R.Br.	Didymocarpoideae: Trichosporeae
Loxonia Jack	Didymocarpoideae: Epithemateae
Loxostigma C.B.Clarke	Didymocarpoideae: Trichosporeae
Lysionotus D.Don	Didymocarpoideae: Trichosporeae
Mandirola Decne.	Gesnerioideae: Gesnerieae
Metapetrocosmea W.T.Wang (synonym Deinostigma W.T.Wang & Z.Y.Li)	Didymocarpoideae: Trichosporeae
Michaelmoelleria F.Wen, Y.G.Wei & T.V.Do	Didymocarpoideae: Trichosporeae
Microchirita (C.B.Clarke) Yin Z.Wang	Didymocarpoideae: Trichosporeae
Middletonia C.Puglisi	Didymocarpoideae: Trichosporeae
Mitraria Cav.	Gesnerioideae: Coronanthereae
Monophyllaea R.Br.	Didymocarpoideae: Epithemateae
Monopyle Moritz ex Benth. & Hook.f.	Gesnerioideae: Gesnerieae
Moussonia Regel	Gesnerioideae: Gesnerieae
Napeanthus Gardner	Gesnerioideae: Napeantheae
Nautilocalyx Linden ex Hanst.	Gesnerioideae: Gesnerieae
Negria F.Muell.	Gesnerioideae: Coronanthereae
Nematanthus Schrad.	Gesnerioideae: Gesnerieae
Neomortonia Wiehler	Gesnerioideae: Gesnerieae
Niphaea Lindl.	Gesnerioideae: Gesnerieae
Nomopyle Roalson & Boggan	Gesnerioideae: Gesnerieae
Orchadocarpa Ridl.	Didymocarpoideae: Trichosporeae
Oreocharis Benth.	Didymocarpoideae: Trichosporeae
Ornithoboea C.S.P.Parish ex C.B.Clarke	Didymocarpoideae: Trichosporeae
Pachycaulos J.L.Clark & J.F.Sm.	Gesnerioideae: Gesnerieae
Pagothyra (Leeuwenb.) J.F.Sm. & J.L.Clark	Gesnerioideae: Gesnerieae
Paliavana Vell. ex Vand.	Gesnerioideae: Gesnerieae
Palmatiboea F.P.Liu & Yin Z.Wang	
Paraboea (C.B.Clarke) Ridl.	Didymocarpoideae: Trichosporeae
Paradrymonia Hanst.	Gesnerioideae: Gesnerieae
Pearcea Regel	Gesnerioideae: Gesnerieae
Peltanthera Benth.	
Petrocodon Hance	Didymocarpoideae: Trichosporeae
Petrocosmea Oliv.	Didymocarpoideae: Trichosporeae
Pheidonocarpa L.E.Skog	Gesnerioideae: Gesnerieae
Phinaea Benth.	Gesnerioideae: Gesnerieae
Platystemma Wall.	Didymocarpoideae: Trichosporeae
Primulina Hance	Didymocarpoideae: Trichosporeae
Pseudochirita W.T.Wang	Didymocarpoideae: Trichosporeae
Rachunia D.J.Middleton & C.Puglisi	Didymocarpoideae: Trichosporeae
Ramonda Rich. (incl. Jankaea Boiss.)	Didymocarpoideae: Trichosporeae
Raphiocarpus Chun	Didymocarpoideae: Trichosporeae
Reldia Wiehler	Gesnerioideae: Beslerieae
Resia H.E.Moore	Gesnerioideae: Beslerieae
Rhabdothamnopsis Hemsl.	Didymocarpoideae: Trichosporeae
Rhabdothamnus A.Cunn.	Gesnerioideae: Coronanthereae
Rhoogeton Leeuwenb.	Gesnerioideae: Gesnerieae
Rhynchoglossum Blume	Didymocarpoideae: Epithemateae
Rhynchotechum Blume	Didymocarpoideae: Trichosporeae
Rhytidophyllum Mart.	Gesnerioideae: Gesnerieae
Ridleyandra A.Weber & B.L.Burtt	Didymocarpoideae: Trichosporeae
Rufodorsia Wiehler	Gesnerioideae: Gesnerieae
Sanango G.S.Bunting & J.A.Duke	Sanangoideae
Sarmienta Ruiz & Pav.	Gesnerioideae: Coronanthereae
Seemannia Regel	Gesnerioideae: Gesnerieae
Senyumia Kiew, A.Weber & B.L.Burtt	Didymocarpoideae: Trichosporeae
Sepikea Schltr.	Didymocarpoideae: Trichosporeae
Shuaria D.A.Neill & J.L.Clark	Gesnerioideae: Beslerieae
Sinningia Nees	Gesnerioideae: Gesnerieae
Skogea U.B.Deshmukh	
Smithiantha Kuntze	Gesnerioideae: Gesnerieae
Solenophora Benth.	Gesnerioideae: Gesnerieae
Somrania D.J.Middleton	Didymocarpoideae: Trichosporeae
Spelaeanthus Kiew, A.Weber & B.L.Burtt	Didymocarpoideae: Trichosporeae
Sphaerorrhiza Roalson & Boggan	Gesnerioideae: Gesnerieae
Stauranthera Benth.	Didymocarpoideae: Epithemateae
Streptocarpus Lindl. (incl. Saintpaulia H.Wendl.)	Didymocarpoideae: Trichosporeae
Tetraphyllum Griff. ex C.B.Clarke (syn. Tetraphylloides Doweld)	Didymocarpoideae: Trichosporeae
Titanotrichum Soler.	Gesnerioideae: Titanotricheae
Tribounia D.J.Middleton	Didymocarpoideae: Trichosporeae
Trichodrymonia Oerst.	Gesnerioideae: Gesnerieae
Tylopsacas Leeuwenb.	Gesnerioideae: Beslerieae
Vanhouttea Lem.	Gesnerioideae: Gesnerieae
Whytockia W.W.Sm.	Didymocarpoideae: Epithemateae

== Ecology ==
About half of the New World species (i.e. the subfamily Gesnerioideae) are co-adapted to bird pollination, particularly by hummingbirds in the Americas. Bird-pollinated species typically have two-lipped flowers in shades of red; examples are found in the genera Asteranthera, Columnea and Sinningia. Among Old World genera, Aeschynanthus has similar flowers.

Typical appearance of bird-pollinated flowers

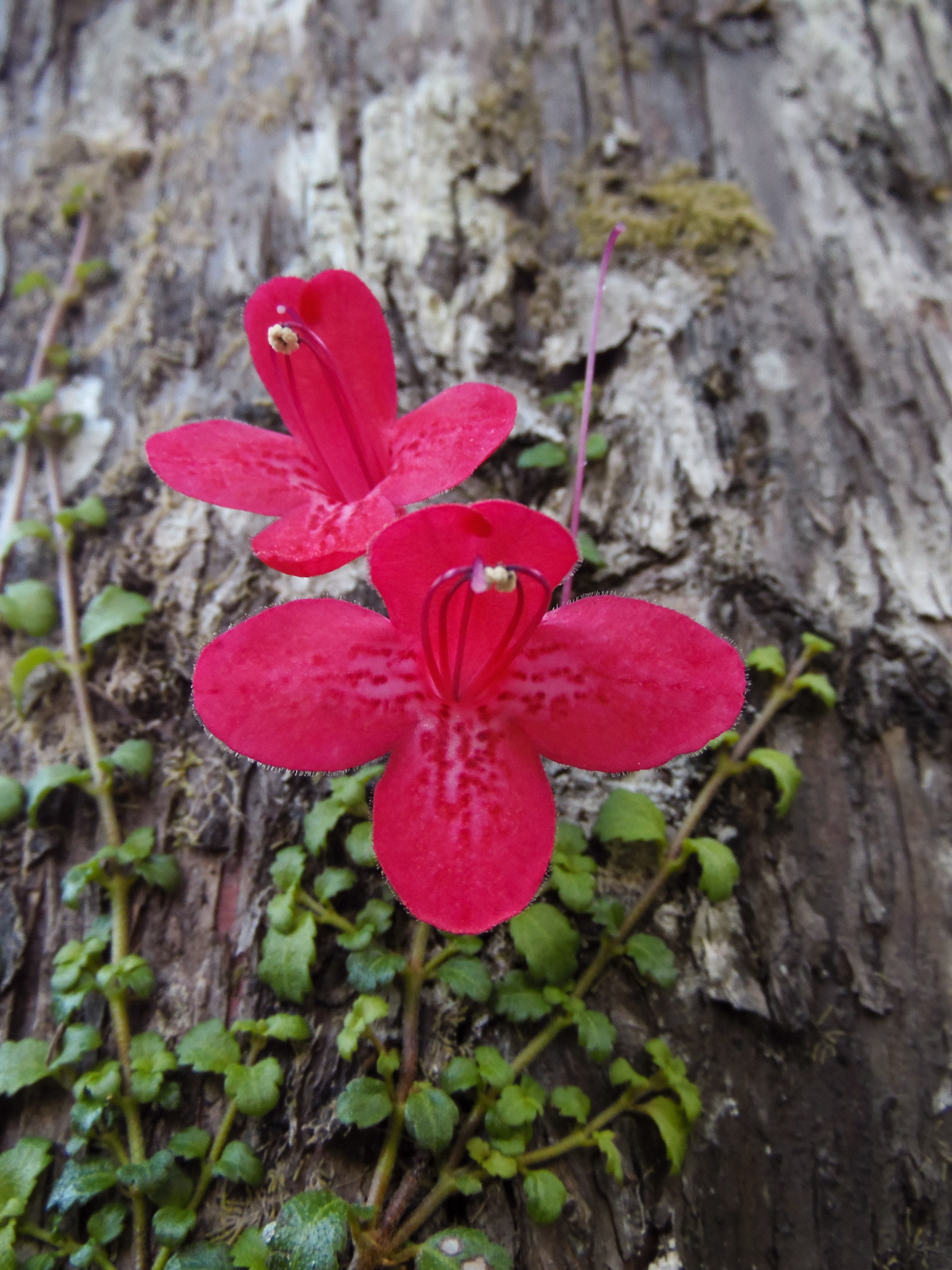
Asteranthera ovata

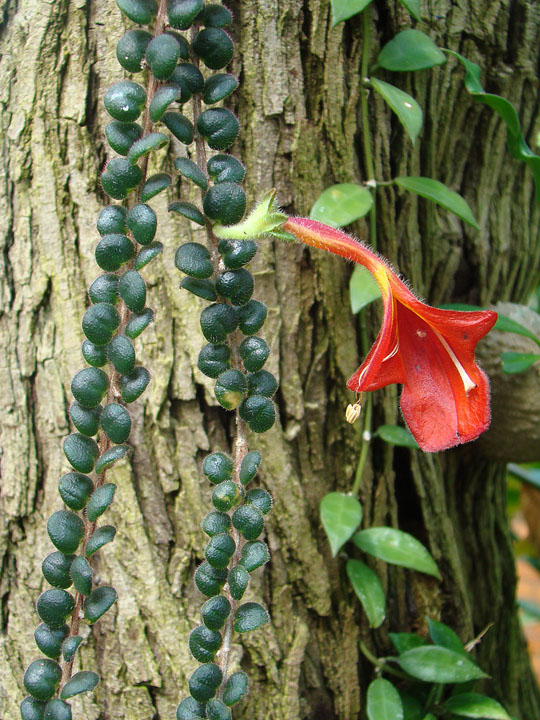
Columnea microphylla

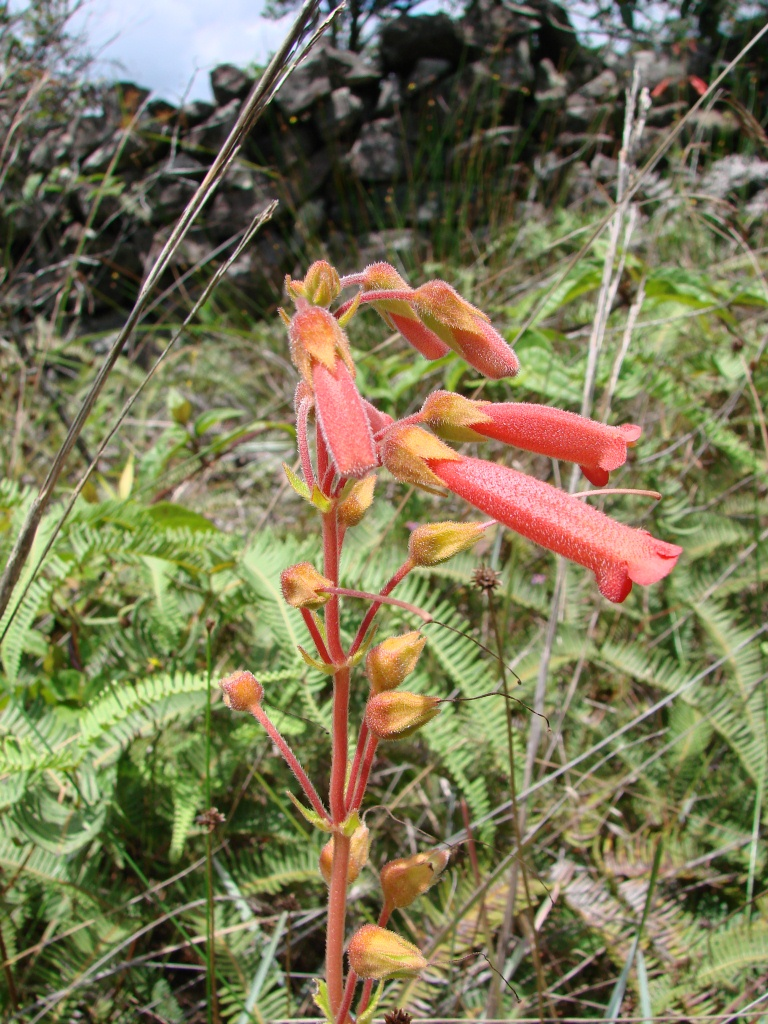
Sinningia sceptrum

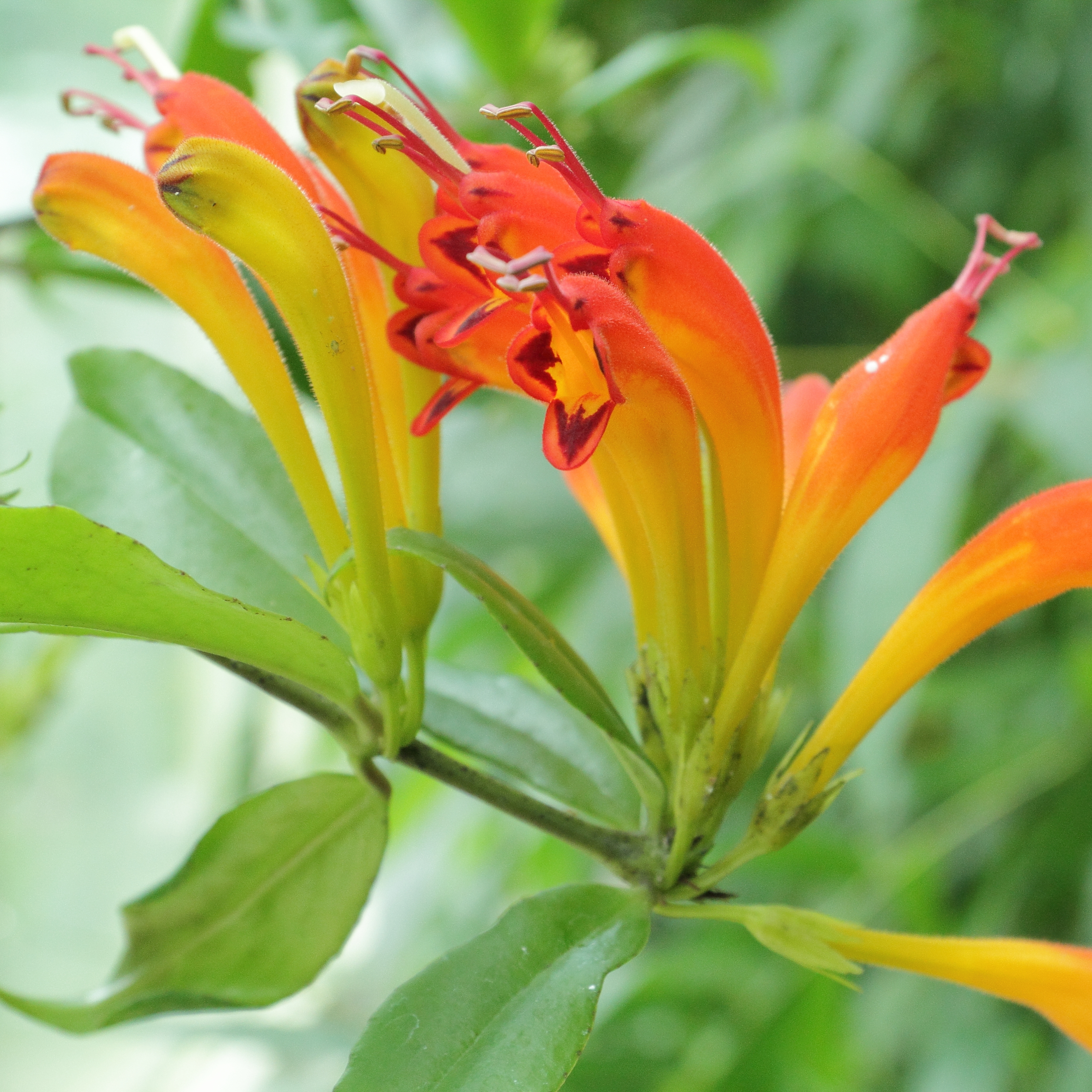
Aeschynanthus speciosus

== Cultivation ==
Some genera in the family are grown as ornamental plants, both as garden plants and as houseplants. Such genera include: Aeschynanthus, Achimenes, Columnea, Gesneria, Haberlea, Nematanthus (syn. Hypocyrta), Ramonda, and Streptocarpus (Cape primroses, African violets). One of the most familiar members of the family to gardeners are the African violets in Streptocarpus section Saintpaulia. Gesneriads are divided culturally into three groups on the basis of whether, and how, their stems are modified into storage organs: rhizomatous, tuberous, and "fibrous-rooted", meaning those that lack such storage structures (although all gesneriads have fibrous roots).
