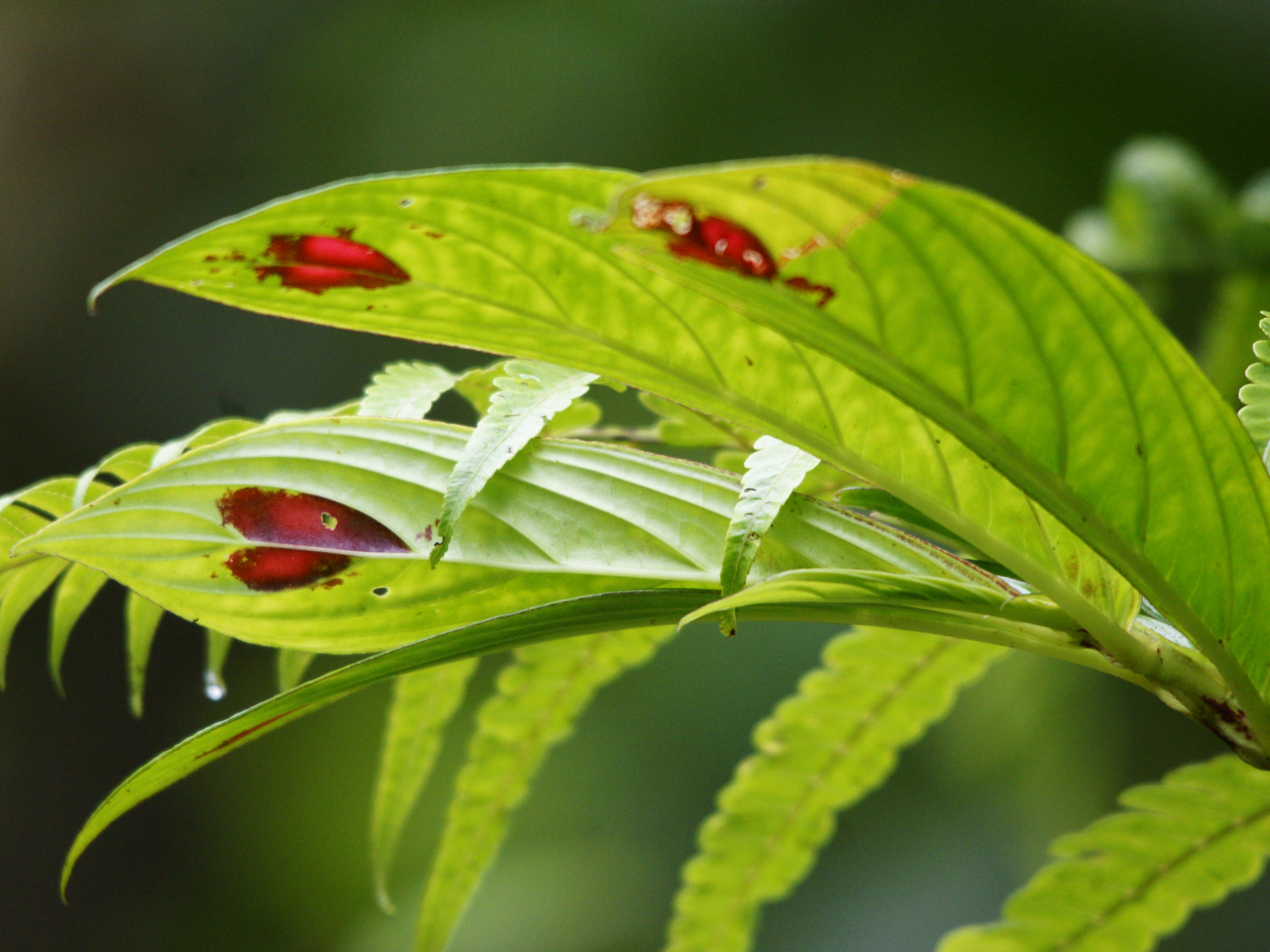
- The leaves of Columnea consanguinea have characteristic red heart-shaped markings on their lower surfaces

Scientific classification
- Kingdom: Plantae
- Clade: Tracheophytes
- Clade: Angiosperms
- Clade: Eudicots
- Clade: Asterids
- Order: Lamiales
- Family: Gesneriaceae
- Genus: Columnea
- Species: C. consanguinea

Binomial name
- Columnea consanguinea Hanst.

Synonyms
- Columnea darienensis C.V. Morton; Dalbergaria consanguinea (Hanst.) Wiehler; Dalbergaria darienensis (C.V. Morton) Wiehler

= Columnea consanguinea =

Species of flowering plant

Columnea consanguinea is a species of flowering plants in the genus Columnea. They are endemic to Colombia, Costa Rica, Ecuador, Nicaragua, and Panama. They are distinctive for possessing red translucent heart-shaped markings on their leaves that serve to attract their main pollinators - the hummingbird Heliodoxa jacula - to their more inconspicuous flowers.

The species was first described by Johannes von Hanstein in 1865. It is classified under the family Gesneriaceae.

== Description ==
Columnea consanguinea is a shrub-like herb with unbranched pale brown and hairy stems that grow to a maximum length of around 1 to 1.2 m (3.3 to 3.9 ft) long. Their leaves are borne on stalks around 1 cm (0.39 in) in length, and arranged in an opposite pattern along the stems. However, one leaf in each pair is a great deal smaller than the other leaf, giving the impression that the leaves are arranged alternately.

The larger leaf blades are lanceolate with unequal sides. They are about 12 to 16 centimetres (4.7 to 6.3 in) long and 3 to 6 cm (1.2 to 2.4 in) wide. They are smooth on the upper surface and slightly hairy on the lower surface. They are predominantly dark green in color but bear characteristic translucent bright red heart-shaped markings on the underside of their leaves. The markings are visible on the upper surface as yellow-green areas. The smaller leaves in the pairs are only 1 to 2.5 cm (0.39 to 0.98 in) in length, and about 0.8 cm (0.31 in) in width. They are located flush to the stems and look like small sheaths.

The small tubular flowers arise from the stem near the bases of the leaves. They are about 3 cm (1.2 in) long and 0.8 cm (0.31 in) wide. The petals are pale yellow in color while the calyx can be green to red. They bloom all throughout the year and develop into small numerous yellow fruits.

Columnea consanguinea closely resemble Columnea florida. The latter also has red heart-shaped markings on their leaves but can be distinguished by the teeth-like (pectinate) edges of their flower calyces.

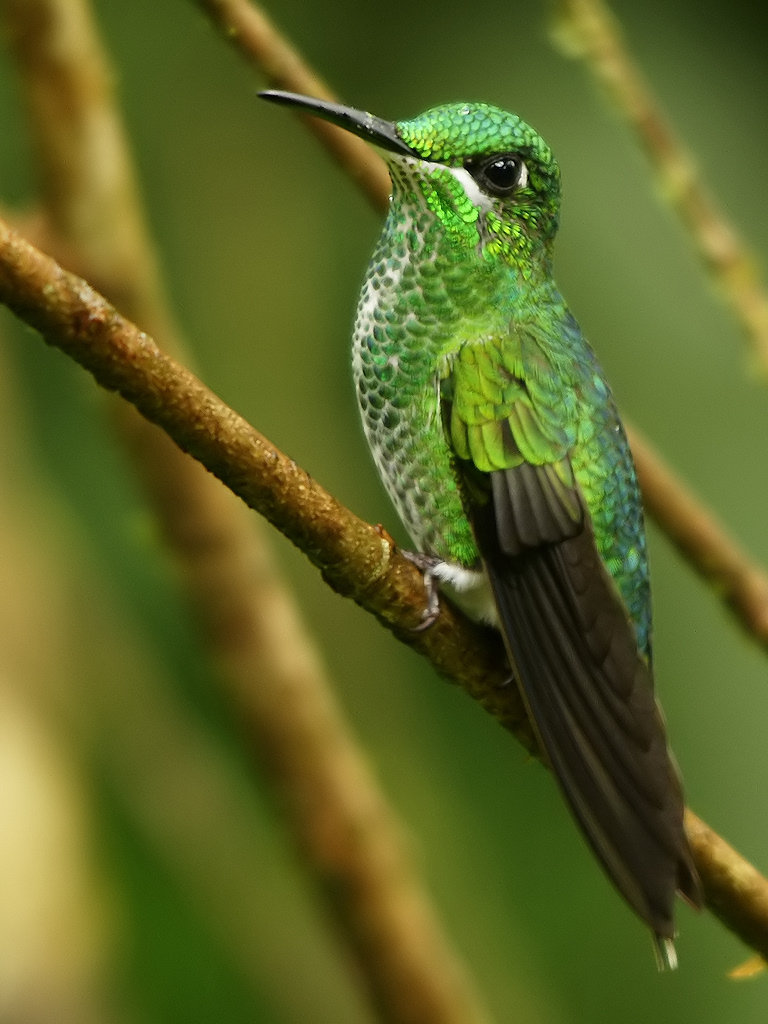
The Green-crowned Brilliant (Heliodoxa jacula) is the main pollinator of Columnea consanguinea

== Ecology ==
Columnea consanguinea have relatively small and drab flowers. In order to attract their main pollinators, the nectarivorous green-crowned brilliant (Heliodoxa jacula), they instead use the markings on their leaves. Sunlight filtering through the translucent patches on their leaves give them a brilliant red color, reminiscent of stained-glass windows. Hummingbirds, like all birds, possess excellent color vision greater than that of humans. They are attracted to the red color of the markings and can then find their way to the flowers to feed. In doing so, they pollinate the flowers of C. consanguinea.

The same strategy is used by C. florida, which also have red markings on their leaves.

== Distribution and habitat ==
Columnea consanguinea grow in tropical rainforests at altitudes of 300 to 1,900 m (980 to 6,230 ft) above sea level. They can be found either growing on the ground (terrestrial) or on the trunks of trees (epiphytic). They are endemic to Colombia, Costa Rica, Ecuador, Nicaragua, and Panama.

== Taxonomy and nomenclature ==
Columnea consanguinea was first described by the German botanist Johannes von Hanstein in 1865. Though Hanstein mistakenly assumed that the type specimens were from the Philippines, they were actually collected by the German botanist Hermann Wendland on March 24, 1857 from Costa Rica.

The generic name Columnea was named by Carl Linnaeus after the Latinized spelling of the name of the 16th-century Italian botanist Fabio Colonna (Latin: Fabius Columnus). Hanstein did not explain the etymology of the specific epithet, but consanguinea is Latin for "with blood".

It is classified under the genus Columnea in the tribe Episcieae, subfamily Gesnerioideae, of the family Gesneriaceae. The German botanist Hans Wiehler reclassified it under a separate genus as Dalbergaria consanguinea in 1973. Wiehler's classification, however, has not gained acceptance among other specialists. Most notably, the American botanist Laurence Skog of the Smithsonian Institution prefers to treat them as belonging to the genus Columnea.

Three varieties are currently recognized:

- Columnea consanguinea var. adpressa B.D. Morley

- Found in Costa Rica and Panama

- Columnea consanguinea var. consanguinea Hanst.

(=) Dalbergaria consanguinea (Hanst.) Wiehler

- Found in Antioquia, Chocó, Risaralda, and Valle del Cauca of Colombia, Esmeraldas in Ecuador, and Costa Rica, Nicaragua, and Panama.

- Columnea consanguinea var. darienensis (C.V. Morton) B.D. Morley

(=) Columnea darienensis C.V. Morton
(=) Dalbergaria darienensis (C.V. Morton) Wiehler

- Found in the Darién Gap region in the border between Colombia and Panama
