= Columnea purpusii =

- Columnea purpusii growing on tree

Scientific classification
- Kingdom: Plantae
- Clade: Tracheophytes
- Clade: Angiosperms
- Clade: Eudicots
- Clade: Asterids
- Order: Lamiales
- Family: Gesneriaceae
- Genus: Columnea
- Species: C. purpusii

Binomial name
- Columnea purpusii Standl.

Species of plant

Flower showing features encouraging hummingbird pollination

Columnea purpusii, with no English name, is a species of shrub growing on trees in southern Mexico. It belongs to the family Gesneriaceae.

== Description ==
Columnea purpusii displays these key features distinguishing it from other gesneriad species:`

- It is an epiphyte and a subshrub with hanging, almost hairless stems up to 70 cm (28 in) long. Sometimes adventitious roots develop along the stems.
- Leathery leaves arising in pairs are up to 5.2 cm (2 in) long and 10 mm (3/8 in) wide. With hairy petioles up to 9 mm (3/8 in) long, the blade margins lack teeth or indentations, and typically roll downward. Hairless or near hairless blades have two or three pairs of secondary veins and are paler on the underside.
- Flowers atop hairy pedicels up to 1.8 mm (1/16 in) long have 5 green, hairy sepals up to 1.9 cm (3/4 in) long, which sometimes at their tips are reddish. Corollas up to 7.4 cm long (nearly 3 inches) are somewhat downward-curved, bulging on the top side and deeply split into top and lower lips. Two small, flap-like side lobes flare outward and may reflex backward, while the slender lower lobe curves downward. Corollas are finely hairy, orangish red with yellow on the bottom side, with the lobes yellow with red markings. Four stamens extend beyond the corolla tube, positioning their anthers for daubing pollen onto the backs of pollinators.
- Fruits are white, fleshy berries which do not split open to release seeds.

== Distribution ==
Columnea purpusii is endemic just to the southern Mexican states of Chiapas, Oaxaca, Tabasco and Veracruz.

== Habitat ==
In Mexico's Veracruz state, Columnea purpusii occurs in oak forests, cloud forests and tropical evergreen forests at elevations from 60 to 1,500 m (200 to 4,920 ft).

== Conservation status ==
Though in 2026 the IUCN Red List did not list Columnea purpusii, a 2021 study in Mexico indicated that the species was in danger of extinction (EN). This was according to criteria defined by the IUCN's categories B2b(iii) and c(ii), which consider the species' limited area of distribution, extent or quality of habitat. The area of occupation of Columnea purpusii was estimated as only 156 km^{2} (60 sq mi).

== Ecology ==
=== Pollinator ===
Columnea purpusii is pollinated by hummingbirds. It may be noted that features of hummingbird-pollinated species include corollas having a tube color of orange, red or yellow, the corolla being curved and slightly inflated, and the sepals possibly bearing some of the same color as the corolla -- all features of Columnea purpusii.

=== Flowering period ===
In Mexico's Veracruz state, Columnea purpusii flowers from February to September.

== As an ornamental plant ==
Gesneriad growers sometimes grow Columnea purpusii in pots, regarding the species as woody-stemmed and lending itself to training as an upright plant with colorful, mottled flowers. This feature suggests the plant may serve as a bonsai subject.

== Taxonomy ==
In 1926 when Paul Carpenter Standley formally named and described Columnea purpusii, he noted that his type specimen had been collected in 1925 in a damp forest in the mountains near Fenix, Chiapas, Mexico, by C. A. Purpus, his #239. The collector was the German botanist Carl Albert Purpus (sometimes known as Carlos Alberto Purpus), who in 1925 was around 74 years old during his collecting trip to Chiapas. His numerous collections encouraged Standley to continue his series Plantae Mexicanae Purpusianae in the Journal of the Washington Academy of Sciences.

=== Phylogeny ===
Molecular phylogenetic analysis based on 13 molecular markers indicated that, of the Columnea species studied, Columnea purpusii belonged to a clade including Columnea ambigua, Columnea dominguensis, Columnea byrsina, Columnea paramicola and Columnea scandens .

=== Etymology ===
The genus name Columnea is New Latin based on column, a Latinized form of the name Fabio Colonna, an Italian writer on plants.

The species name purpusii honors Carl Albert Purpus, the German botanist who collected the type specimen upon which the formal description of Columnea purpusii is based.
