= Linceo =

Linceo may refer to:

- a member of Accademia dei Lincei, an Italian academy
- Fabio Colonna (1567–1640), Italian naturalist and botanist
