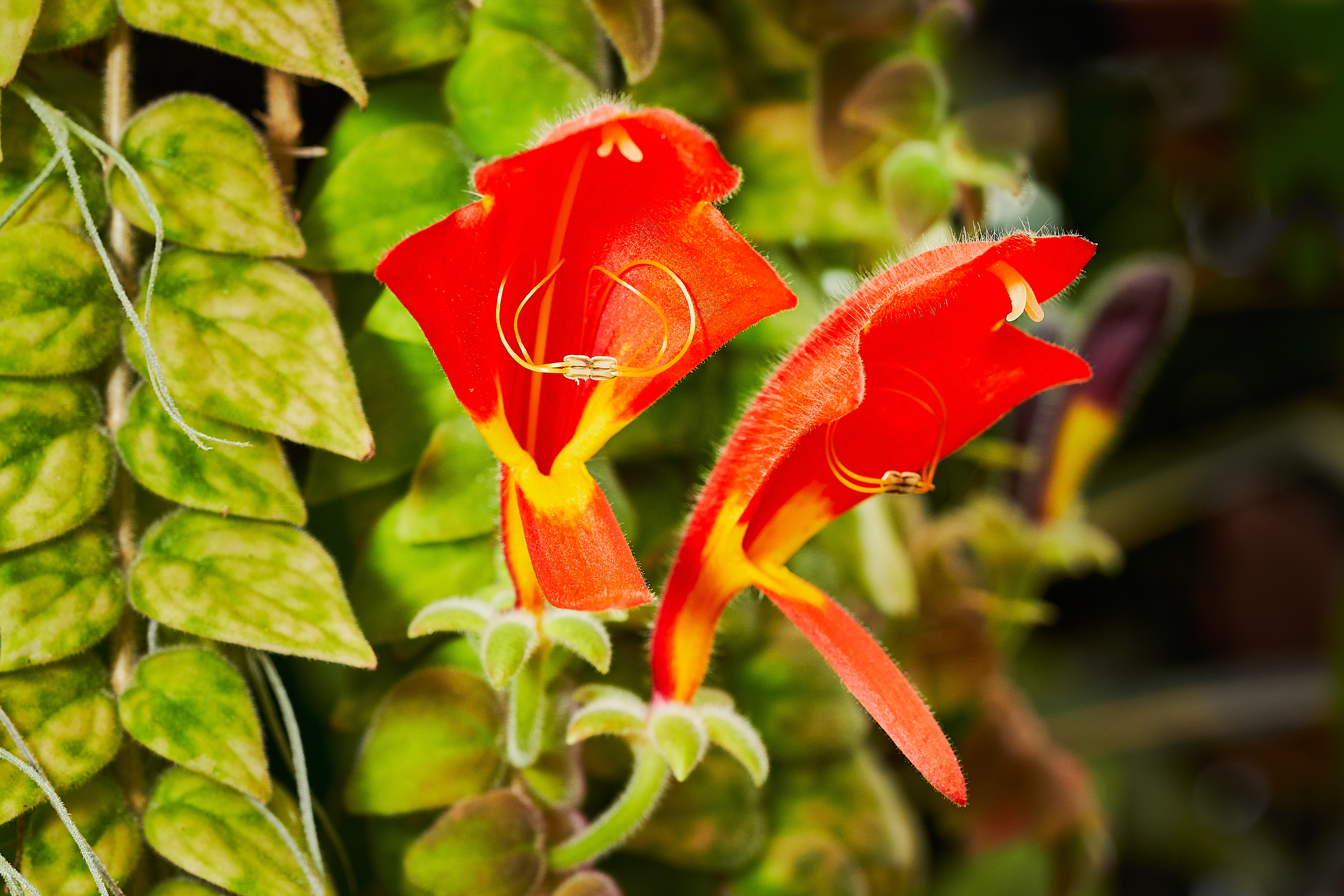

Scientific classification
- Kingdom: Plantae
- Clade: Embryophytes
- Clade: Tracheophytes
- Clade: Angiosperms
- Clade: Eudicots
- Clade: Asterids
- Order: Lamiales
- Family: Gesneriaceae
- Genus: Columnea
- Species: C. gloriosa

Binomial name
- Columnea gloriosa Sprague

= Columnea gloriosa =

Species of flowering plant

Columnea gloriosa is commonly known as the goldfish plant (a name it shares with a number of other species), because of the fish shaped flowers it produces. Native to the Caribbean, Central and South American tropics, it falls into the genus Columnea. Also known as a cousin to African violets. This plant is in the family Gesneriaceae. Some authorities have it as a synonym of Columnea microcalyx.

== Description ==
Columnea gloriosa is known for the red long tubular shaped flowers appearing like leaping fish that appear from spring to summer. Oblanceolate leaves with reddish hairs that help distinguish them from other hybrids. A mature plant will grow cascading stems up to 3 feet in length (91 cm) which work well in a hanging basket. The leaves are 2 to 3 inches (5 to 7.5cm) long, and are thick, waxy, and dark green, although there are some varieties with hairy leaves.

== Cultivation ==
If conditions are right this plant will produce many blooms along the stem if supplied with the right nutrients. This hybrid prefers high indirect light with constant moisture during growing season, allow ample time to dry out between watering. It must be kept in humid, bright conditions to keep bottom leaves from falling off, and temperatures between 65-75 F (18-24 °C), though direct sunlight can scorch the leaves.
