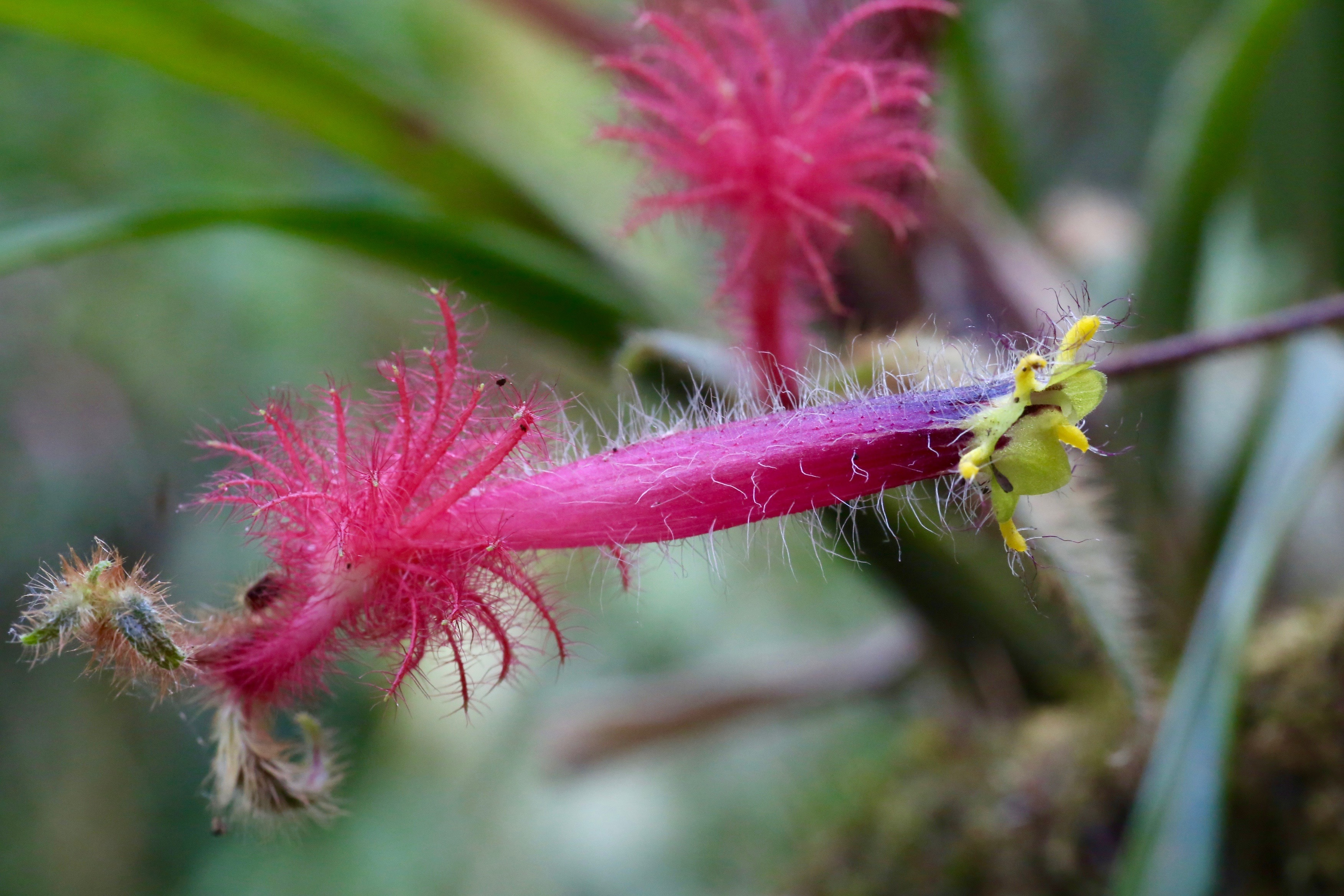
- Columnea minor, in Pichincha, Ecuador

Scientific classification
- Kingdom: Plantae
- Clade: Tracheophytes
- Clade: Angiosperms
- Clade: Eudicots
- Clade: Asterids
- Order: Lamiales
- Family: Gesneriaceae
- Genus: Columnea
- Species: C. minor

Binomial name
- Columnea minor (Hook.) Hanst.

Synonyms
- Columnea bullata (C.V.Morton) C.V.Morton; Columnea elegans (Rose ex C.V.Morton) C.V.Morton; Columnea major (Hook.) Hanst.; Columnea martiana Kuntze; Columnea teuscheri (C.V.Morton) H.E.Moore; Ortholoma clarum (C.V. Morton) Wiehler; Ortholoma minor (Hook.) Wiehler; Ortholoma tropicale (C.V. Morton) Wiehler; Trichantha bullata C.V. Morton; Trichantha clara C.V. Morton; Trichantha elegans Rose ex C.V. Morton; Trichantha major Hook.; Trichantha minor Hook.; Trichantha teuscheri C.V. Morton; Trichantha tropicalis C.V. Morton

= Columnea minor =

Species of epiphyte

Columnea minor is a species of epiphytic flowering plants in the family Gesneriaceae. It is found in Ecuador.
