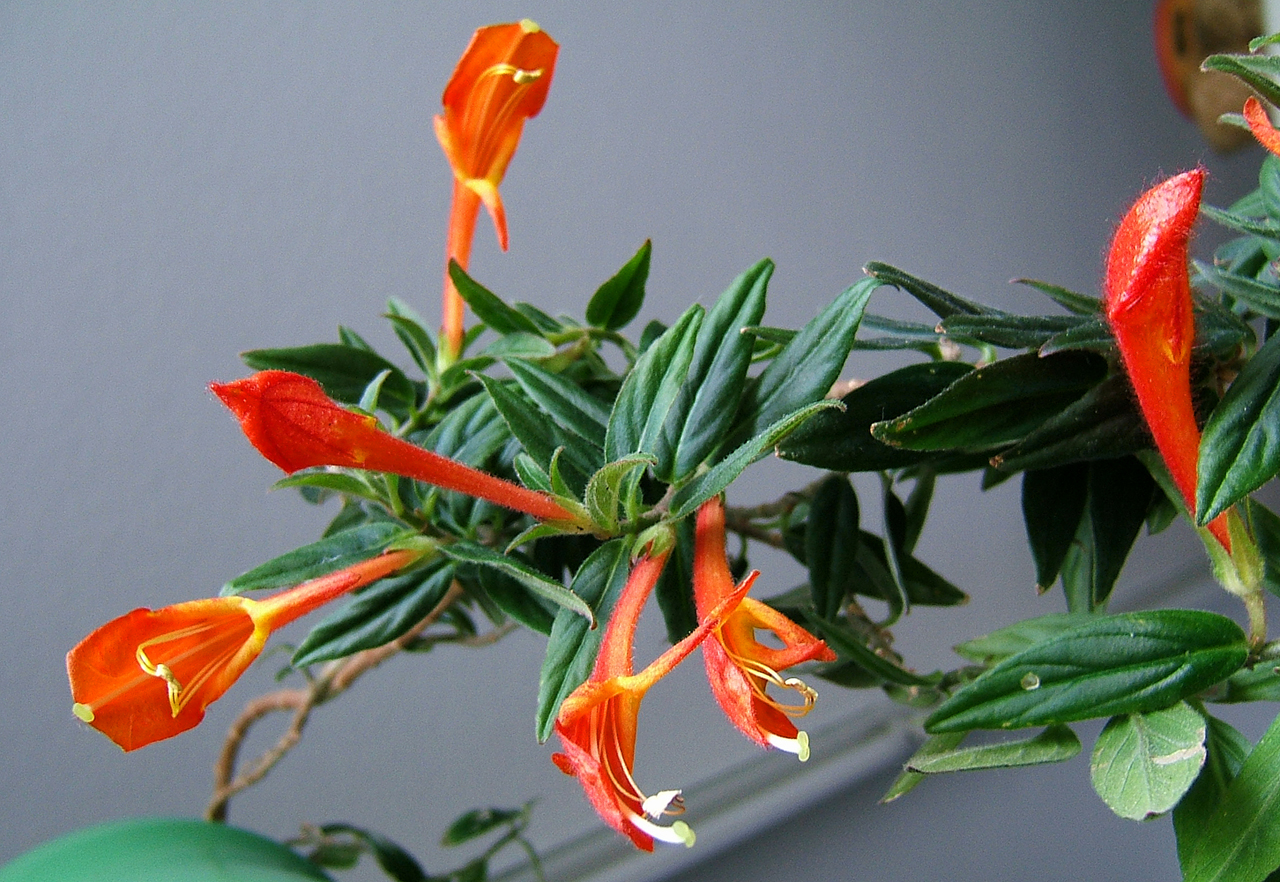
- Columnea crassifolia

Scientific classification
- Kingdom: Plantae
- Clade: Tracheophytes
- Clade: Angiosperms
- Clade: Eudicots
- Clade: Asterids
- Order: Lamiales
- Family: Gesneriaceae
- Genus: Columnea; Plum. ex L. (1753)

Species
- 216, see text

Synonyms
- Aponoa Raf. (1838); Bucinella Wiehler (1977), nom. illeg.; Bucinellina Wiehler (1981); Collandra Lem. (1847); Dalbergaria Tussac (1808); Eusynetra Raf. (1837); Fluckigeria Rusby (1895); Glycanthes Raf. (1838); Hematophyla Raf. (1838); Kohlerianthus Fritsch (1897); Loboptera Colla (1849); Ortholoma Hanst. (1854); Pentadenia Hanst. (1854); Pterygoloma Hanst. (1854); Stenanthus Oerst. ex Hanst. (1854); Stygnanthe Hanst. (1854); Trichantha Hook. (1844); Vireya Raf. (1814), nom. rej.

= Columnea =

Genus of epiphytes

Columnea is a genus of around 200 species of epiphytic herbs and shrubs in the family Gesneriaceae, native to the tropics of the Americas and the Caribbean. The tubular or oddly shaped flowers are usually large and brightly colored – usually red, yellow, or orange – sometimes resembling a fish in shape. A common name is flying goldfish plants (see also the related Nematanthus) due to the unusual flower shape.

The genus was named by Carl Linnaeus after the Latinized spelling of the name of the 16th-century Italian botanist Fabio Colonna (Latin: Fabius Columnus).

The segregate genus Bucinellina is considered by many botanists a synonym of Columnea. A full list of the species now accepted in the genus, along with their synonyms, can be found at the World Checklist of Gesneriaceae.

== Cultivation ==
Columnea species grow as epiphytic plants in the wild and require bright light, good air circulation, and a well-drained growing medium that is allowed to dry out slightly between waterings. They are very tolerant of underpotting and seem to bloom best when potbound. Most are tropical plants and are easy to grow under indoor or greenhouse conditions but some species come from high altitudes and require cooler temperatures to grow well or bloom. Many of the species are seasonal bloomers, but hybrids and cultivars can be more or less continuously blooming.

The hybrid Columnea × banksii has gained the Royal Horticultural Society's Award of Garden Merit.

== Species ==
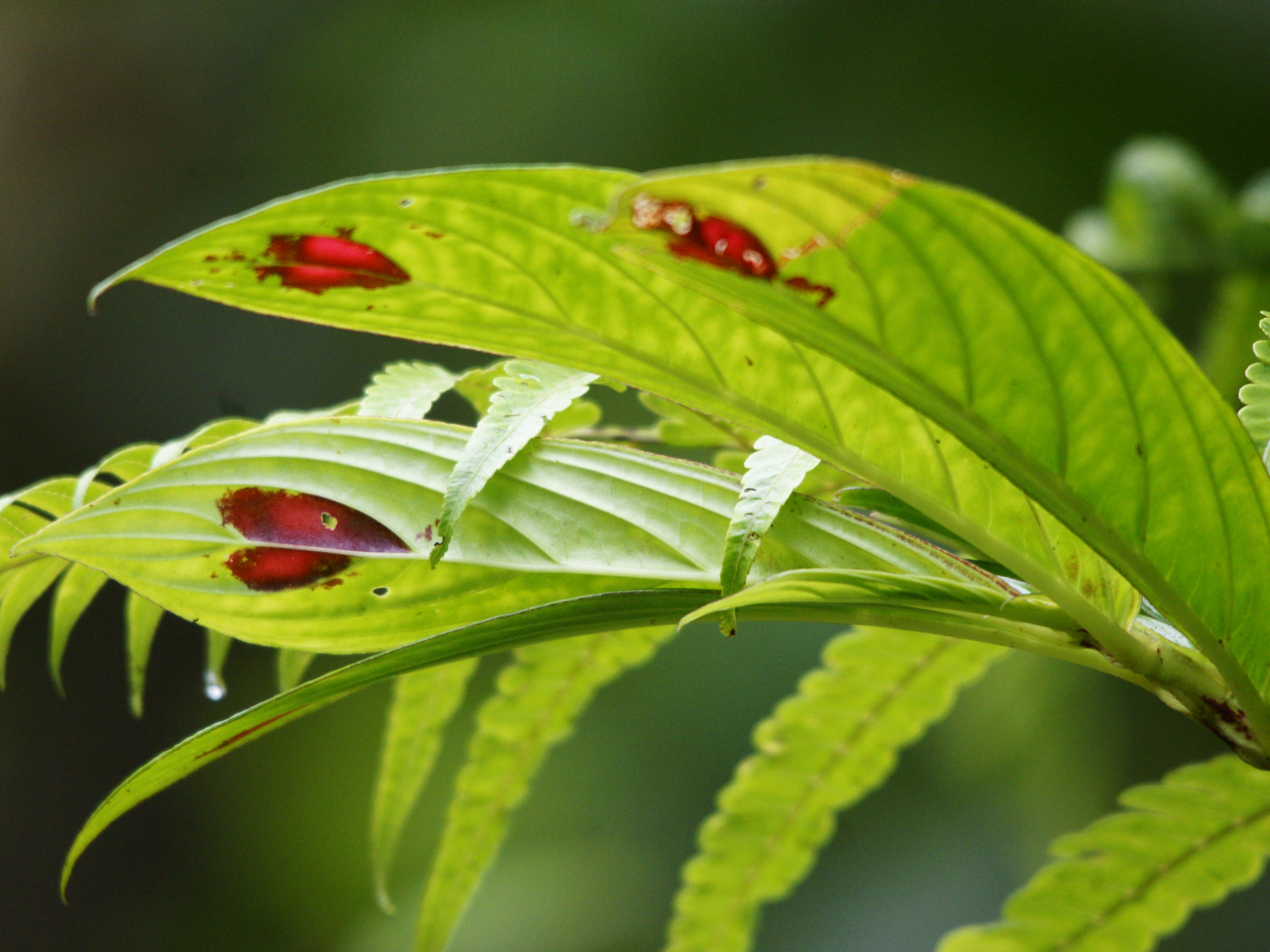
Columnea consanguinea foliage

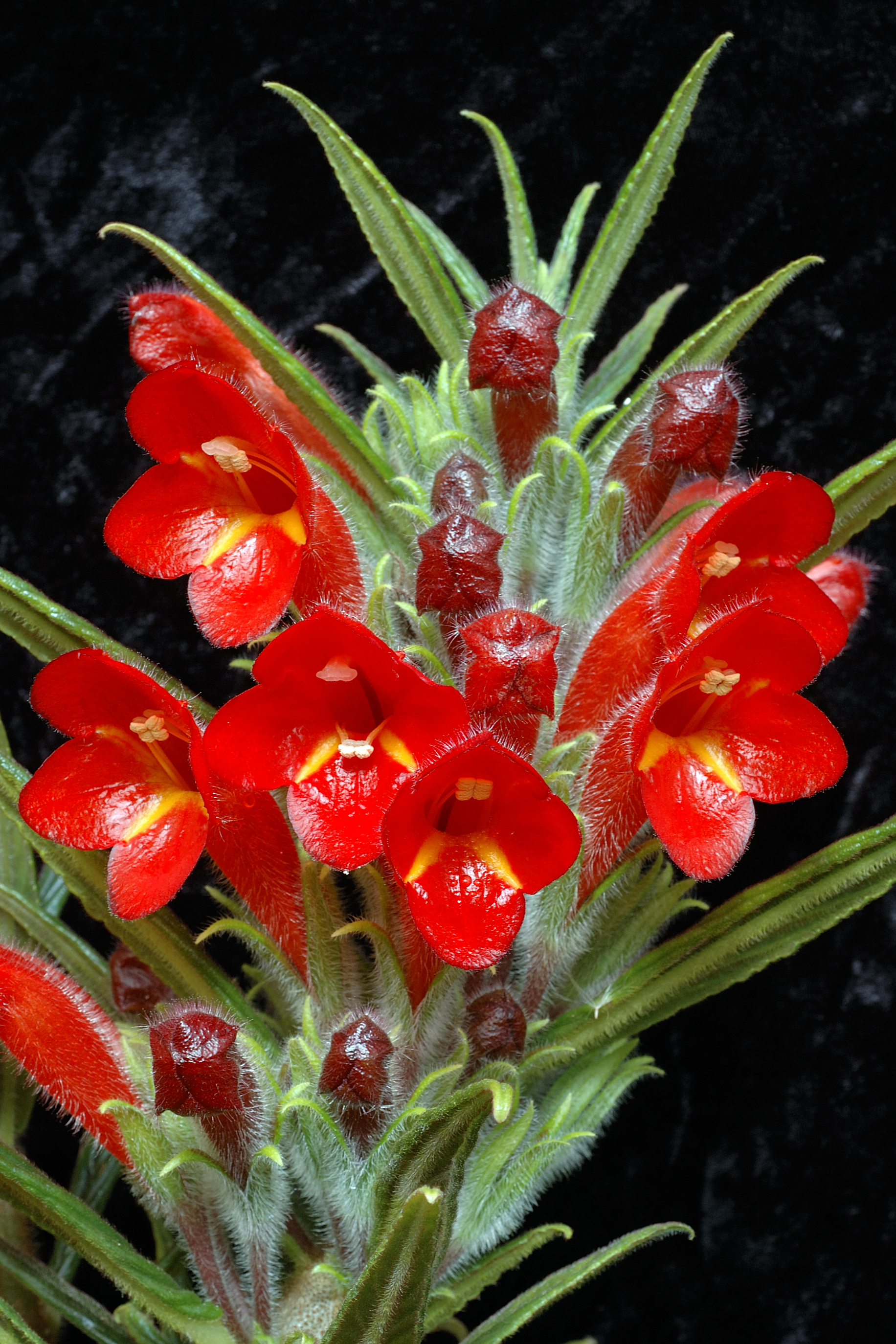
Columnea flexiflora inflorescence

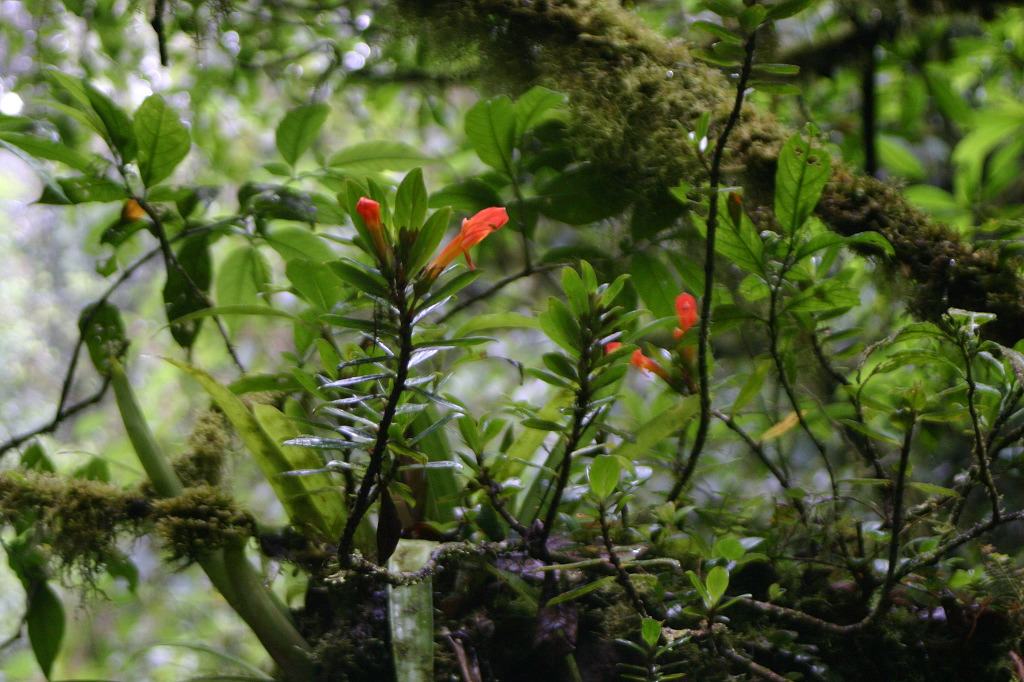
Columnea glabra habitus

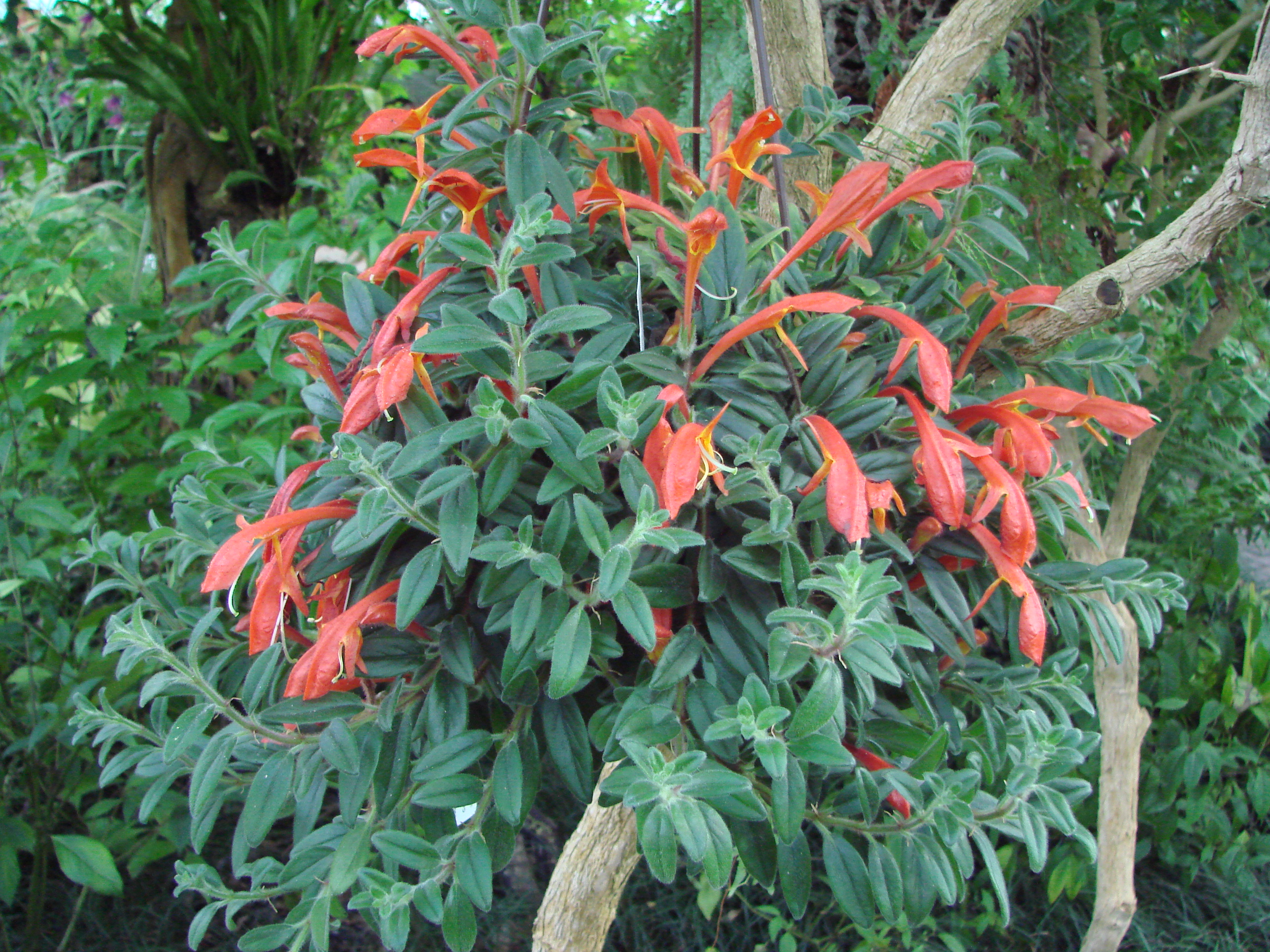
Columnea hirta habitus

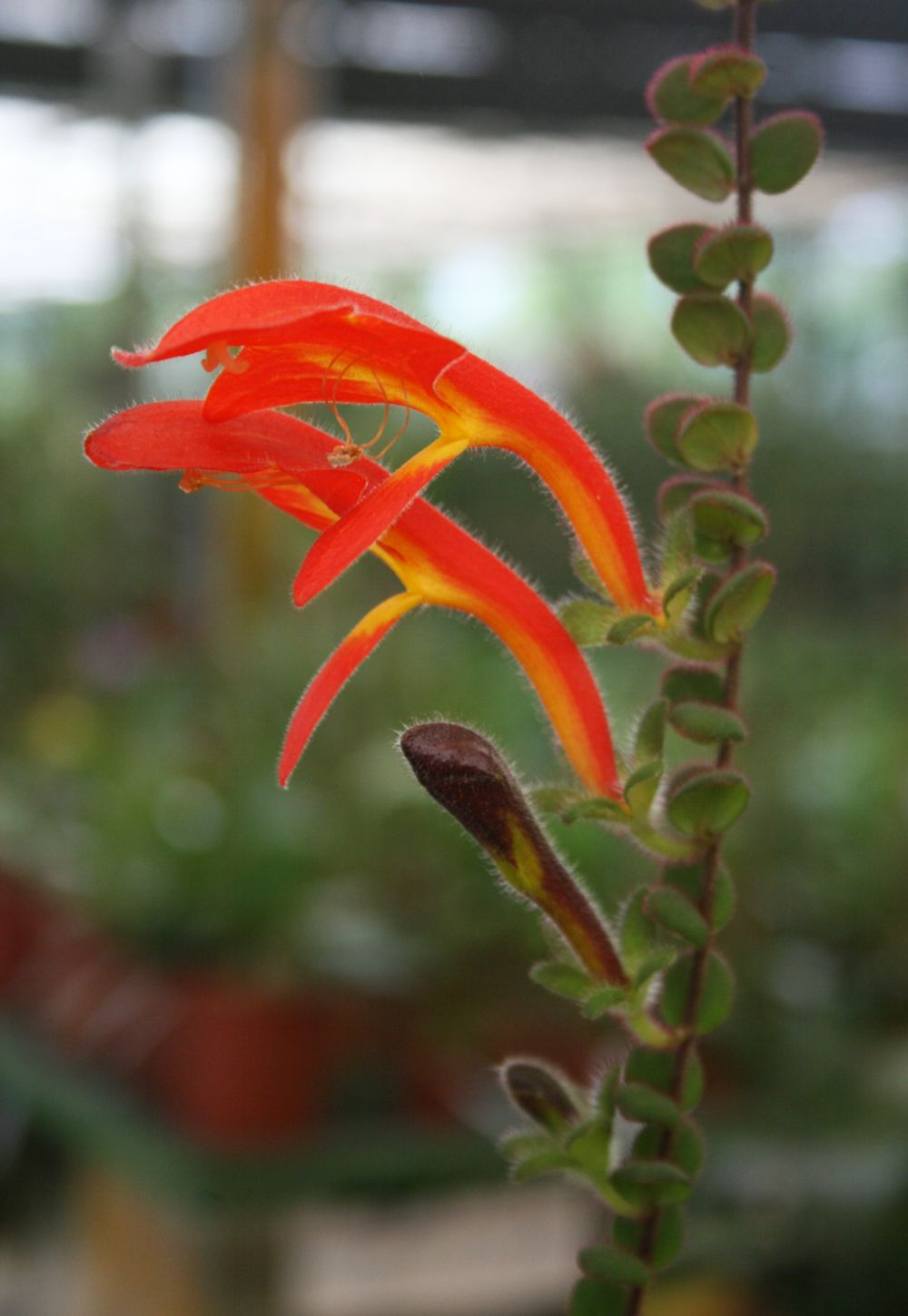
Columnea microphylla flowers

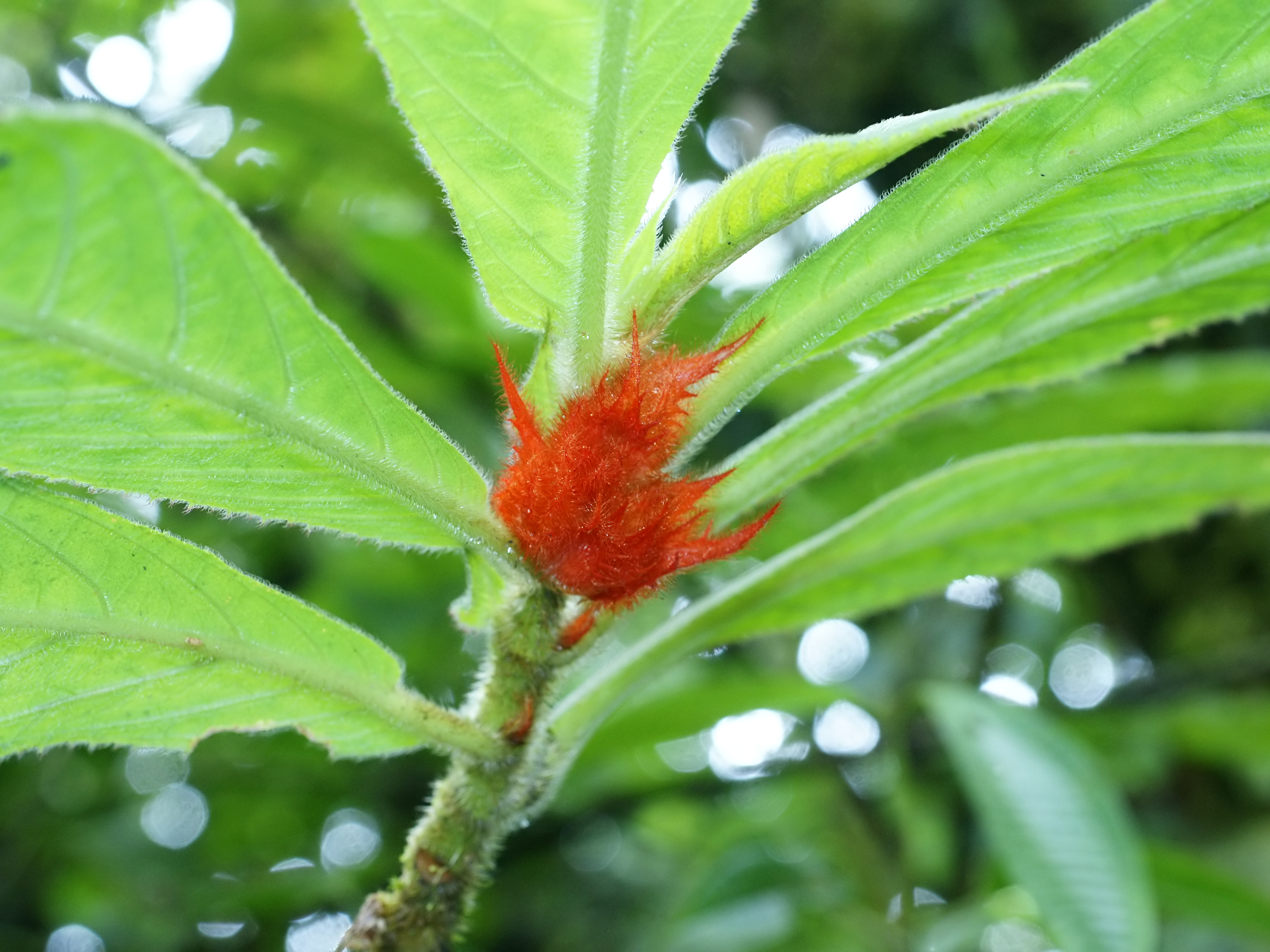
Columnea purpurata habitus

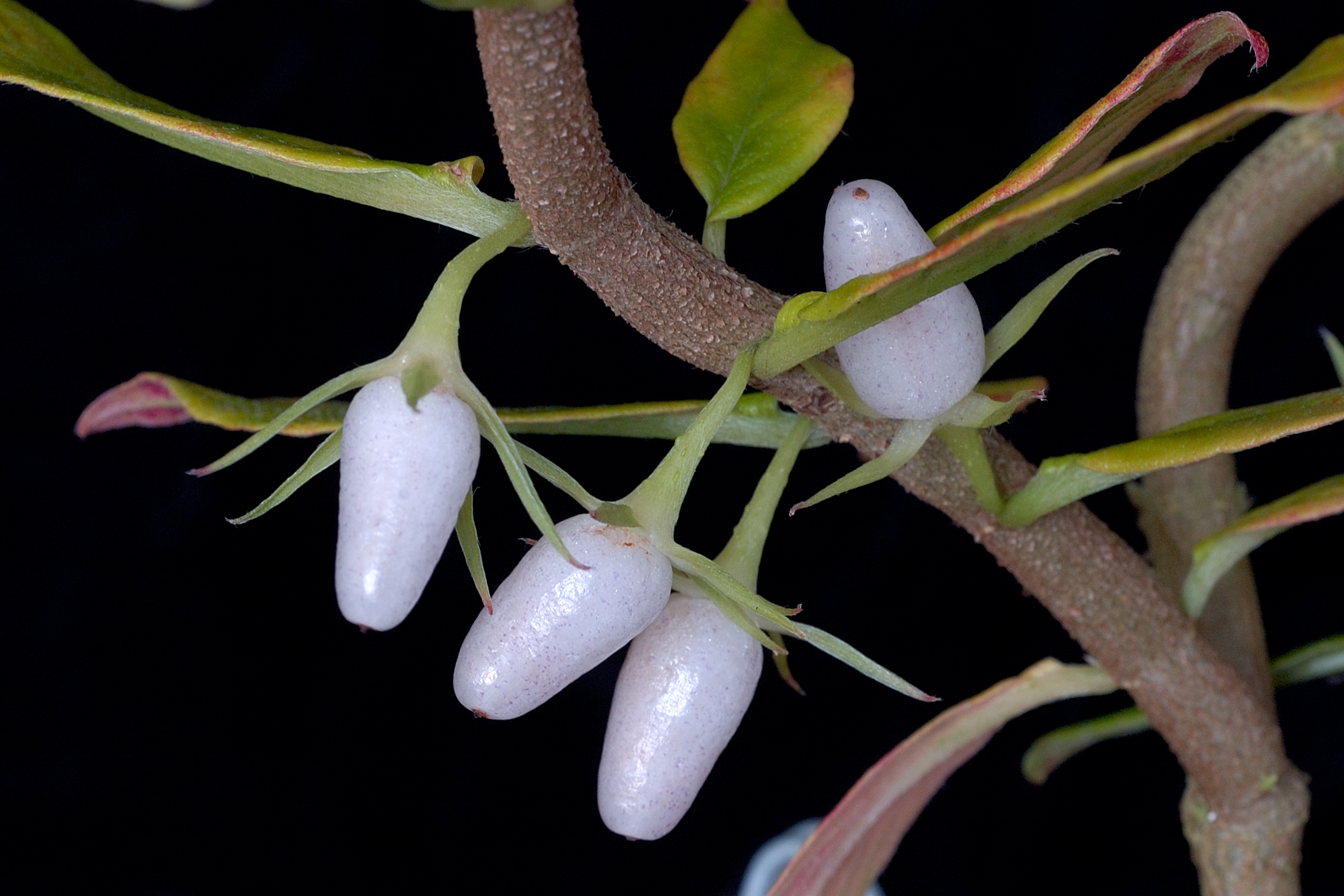
Columnea orientandina fruit

216 species are accepted.

- Columnea albiflora L.P. Kvist & L.E. Skog
- Columnea albovinosa (M.Freiberg) J.L.Clark & L.E.Skog
- Columnea aliena (C.V. Morton) C.V. Morton
- Columnea allenii C.V. Morton
- Columnea ambigua (Urb.) B.D. Morley
- Columnea ampliata (Wiehler) L.E. Skog
- Columnea angulata J.L.Clark & Tobar
- Columnea angustata (Wiehler) L.E. Skog
- Columnea anisophylla DC.
- Columnea antennifera J.L.Clark & Clavijo
- Columnea antiocana (Wiehler) J.F. Sm.
- Columnea argentea Griseb.
- Columnea arguta C.V. Morton
- Columnea asteroloma (Wiehler) L.E. Skog
- Columnea atahualpae J.F. Sm. & L.E. Skog
- Columnea aurantia Wiehler
- Columnea aurea Warsz., nom. nud.
- Columnea bilabiata Seem.
- Columnea billbergiana Beurl.
- Columnea bivalvis J.L. Clark & M. Amaya
- Columnea blancoi J.E.Jiménez, Chinchilla & Kriebel
- Columnea brenneri (Wiehler) B.D. Morley
- Columnea brevipila Urb.
- Columnea byrsina (Wiehler) L.P. Kvist & L.E. Skog
- Columnea calotricha Donn. Sm.
- Columnea canarina Wiehler
- Columnea capillosa L.P. Kvist & L.E. Skog
- Columnea carinata J.L.Clark & L.E.Skog
- Columnea caudata M.Amaya & L.P.Kvist
- Columnea cerropirrana (Wiehler) L.E. Skog
- Columnea ceticeps J.L.Clark & J.F.Sm.
- Columnea chiricana Wiehler
- Columnea chocoensis M.Amaya & L.E.Skog
- Columnea chrysotricha L.E. Skog & L.P. Kvist
- Columnea ciliata (Wiehler) L.P. Kvist & L.E. Skog
- Columnea citriflora L.E. Skog
- Columnea cobana Donn. Sm.
- Columnea colombiana (Wiehler) L.P. Kvist & L.E. Skog
- Columnea consanguinea Hanst.
- Columnea coronata M. Amaya, L.E. Skog & L.P. Kvist
- Columnea coronocrypta M. Amaya, L.E. Skog & L.P. Kvist
- Columnea corralesii M.Amaya & J.F.Sm.
- Columnea crassa C.V. Morton
- Columnea crassicaulis (Wiehler) L.P. Kvist & L.E. Skog
- Columnea crassifolia Brongn. ex Lem.
- Columnea cruenta B.D. Morley
- Columnea cuspidata L.E. Skog & L.P. Kvist
- Columnea dictyophylla Donn. Sm.
- Columnea dielsii Mansf.
- Columnea dimidiata (Benth.) Kuntze
- Columnea dissimilis C.V. Morton
- Columnea domingensis (Urb.) B.D. Morley
- Columnea dressleri Wiehler
- Columnea eburnea (Wiehler) L.P. Kvist & L.E. Skog
- Columnea elongatifolia L.P. Kvist & L.E. Skog
- Columnea ericae Mansf.
- Columnea erythrophaea Decne. ex Houll.
- Columnea erythrophylla Hanst.
- Columnea eubracteata Mansf.
- Columnea fawcettii (Urb.) C.V. Morton
- Columnea fernandezii M. Amaya
- Columnea ferruginea J.F.Sm. & J.L.Clark
- Columnea figueroae M.Amaya
- Columnea filamentosa L.E. Skog
- Columnea filifera (Wiehler) L.E. Skog & L.P. Kvist
- Columnea filipes Oliver
- Columnea fimbricalyx L.P. Kvist & L.E. Skog
- Columnea flaccida Seem.
- Columnea flexiflora L.P. Kvist & L.E. Skog
- Columnea floribunda Tobar & J.L.Clark
- Columnea florida C.V. Morton
- Columnea fluidifolia J.L.Clark & Tobar
- Columnea foreroi M.Amaya
- Columnea formosa (C.V. Morton) C.V. Morton
- Columnea fractiflexa J.F.Sm. & J.L.Clark
- Columnea fritschii (Rusby) J.F. Sm.
- Columnea fuscihirta L.P. Kvist & L.E. Skog
- Columnea gallicauda Wiehler
- Columnea gigantifolia L.P. Kvist & L.E. Skog
- Columnea glabra Oerst.
- Columnea grata (Oerst. ex Hanst.) C.V.Morton
- Columnea grisebachiana Kuntze
- Columnea guatemalensis Sprague
- Columnea guianensis C.V. Morton
- Columnea guttata Poepp. in Poepp. & Endl.
- Columnea harrisii (Urb.) Britton ex C.V. Morton
- Columnea herthae Mansf.
- Columnea hiantiflora Wiehler
- Columnea hirsuta Swartz, non Auct.
- Columnea hirsutissima C.V. Morton
- Columnea hirta Klotzsch & Hanst.
- Columnea hispida Swartz
- Columnea hypocyrtantha (Wiehler) J.F. Sm. & L.E. Skog
- Columnea illepida H.E. Moore
- Columnea inaequilatera Poepp. in Poepp. & Endl.
- Columnea incarnata C.V. Morton
- Columnea incredibilis L.P. Kvist & L.E. Skog
- Columnea isernii Cuatrec.
- Columnea kalbreyeriana Masters
- Columnea karstenianum R.Kr.Singh
- Columnea katzensteiniae (Wiehler) L.E. Skog & L.P. Kvist
- Columnea kienastiana Regel
- Columnea kucyniakii Raymond
- Columnea labellosa H. Karst.
- Columnea laciniata J.L.Clark & M.Amaya
- Columnea laevis L.P. Kvist & L.E. Skog
- Columnea lanata (Seem.) Kuntze
- Columnea lariensis Kriebel
- Columnea lehmannii Mansf.
- Columnea lepidocaula Hanst.
- Columnea linearis Oerst.
- Columnea longinervosa L.P. Kvist & L.E. Skog
- Columnea longipedicellata M.Amaya, Clavijo & O.H.Marín
- Columnea lophophora Mansf.
- Columnea lucifer J.L. Clark
- Columnea maculata C.V. Morton
- Columnea magnifica Klotzsch ex Oerst.
- Columnea manabiana (Wiehler) J.F. Sm. & L.E. Skog
- Columnea mastersonii (Wiehler) L.E. Skog & L.P. Kvist
- Columnea medicinalis (Wiehler) L.E. Skog & L.P. Kvist
- Columnea megafolia L.E.Skog & M.Amaya
- Columnea microcalyx Hanst. (synonym Columnea gloriosa Sprague)
- Columnea microphylla Klotzsch & Hanst. ex Oerst.
- Columnea minor (Hook.) Hanst.
- Columnea minutiflora L.P. Kvist & L.E. Skog
- Columnea mira B.D. Morley
- Columnea moesta Poepp. in Poepp. & Endl.
- Columnea moorei C.V. Morton
- Columnea nariniana (Wiehler) L.P. Kvist & L.E. Skog
- Columnea nematoloba L.P. Kvist & L.E. Skog
- Columnea nervosa (Klotzsch ex Oerst.) Hanst.
- Columnea nicaraguensis Oerst.
- Columnea oblongifolia Rusby
- Columnea ochroleuca (Klotzsch ex Oerst.) Hanst.
- Columnea oerstediana Klotzsch ex Oerst.
- Columnea orientandina (Wiehler) L.P. Kvist & L.E. Skog
- Columnea ornata (Wiehler) L.E. Skog & L.P. Kvist
- Columnea ovatifolia L.P. Kvist & L.E. Skog
- Columnea oxyphylla Hanst.
- Columnea panamensis C.V. Morton
- Columnea paraguensis M.Amaya & J.F.Sm.
- Columnea paramicola (Wiehler) L.P.Kvist & L.E.Skog
- Columnea parviflora C.V. Morton
- Columnea pectinata C.V. Morton
- Columnea pedunculata M. Amaya, L.E. Skog & L.P. Kvist
- Columnea pendens J.L.Clark, Tobar & J.F.Sm.
- Columnea pendula (Klotzsch ex Oerst.) Hanst.
- Columnea perpulchra C.V. Morton
- Columnea peruviana Zahlbr.
- Columnea polyantha (Wiehler) L.E. Skog
- Columnea poortmannii (Wiehler) L.P. Kvist & L.E. Skog
- Columnea praetexta Hanst.
- Columnea proctorii Stearn
- Columnea pubescens (Griseb.) Kuntze
- Columnea pulcherrima C.V. Morton
- Columnea pulchra (Wiehler) L.E. Skog
- Columnea purpurata Hanst.
- Columnea purpureovittata (Wiehler) B.D. Morley
- Columnea purpurimarginata L.P. Kvist & L.E. Skog
- Columnea purpusii Standl.
- Columnea pygmaea J.L. Clark & J.F. Sm.
- Columnea querceti Oerst.
- Columnea queremalensis M. Amaya, L.E. Skog & L.P. Kvist
- Columnea rangelii M.Amaya & O.H.Marín
- Columnea raymondii C.V. Morton
- Columnea repens (Hook.) Hanst.
- Columnea reticulata M. Amaya, L.E.Skog, C.E.González, & J.F.Sm.
- Columnea rileyi (Wiehler) J.F.Sm.
- Columnea ringens Regel
- Columnea robusta (Wiehler) L.E.Skog
- Columnea rosea (C.V. Morton) C.V.Morton
- Columnea rubra C.V. Morton
- Columnea rubriacuta (Wiehler) L.P.Kvist & L.E.Skog
- Columnea rubribracteata L.P.Kvist & L.E.Skog
- Columnea rubricalyx L.P.Kvist & L.E.Skog
- Columnea rubricaulis Standl.
- Columnea rubrocincta C.V.Morton
- Columnea rutilans Swartz
- Columnea sanguinea (Pers.) Hanst.
- Columnea sanguinolenta (Klotzsch ex Oerst.) Hanst.
- Columnea scandens L.
- Columnea schiedeana Schlechtend.
- Columnea schimpffii Mansf.
- Columnea segregata B.D.Morley
- Columnea sericeo-villosa Suess.
- Columnea serrata (Klotzsch ex Oerst.) Hanst.
- Columnea silvarum C.V.Morton
- Columnea skogii Amaya M.
- Columnea spathulata Mansf.
- Columnea stilesiana M.Amaya & L.P.Kvist
- Columnea stricta Rusby
- Columnea strigosa Benth.
- Columnea subcordata C.V.Morton
- Columnea suffruticosa J.F.Sm. & L.E.Skog
- Columnea sulcata L.E.Skog & L.P.Kvist
- Columnea sulfurea Donn. Sm.
- Columnea tandapiana (Wiehler) L.E.Skog & L.P.Kvist
- Columnea tecta J.L.Clark & Clavijo
- Columnea tenella L.P.Kvist & L.E.Skog
- Columnea tenensis (Wiehler) B.D. Morley
- Columnea tenuis Klotzsch ex Oerst.
- Columnea tessmannii Mansf.
- Columnea tincta Griseb.
- Columnea tomentulosa C.V. Morton
- Columnea trollii Mansf.
- Columnea tutunendana (Wiehler) L.E.Skog
- Columnea ulei Mansf.
- Columnea ultraviolacea J.F.Sm. & L.E.Skog
- Columnea urbanii Stearn
- Columnea verecunda C.V.Morton
- Columnea villosissima Mansf.
- Columnea vinacea C.V.Morton
- Columnea vittata (Wiehler) L.E.Skog
- Columnea weberbaueri Mansf.
- Columnea xiphoidea J.F.Sm. & L.E.Skog
- Columnea zebranella Wiehler
- Columnea zebrina Raymond
