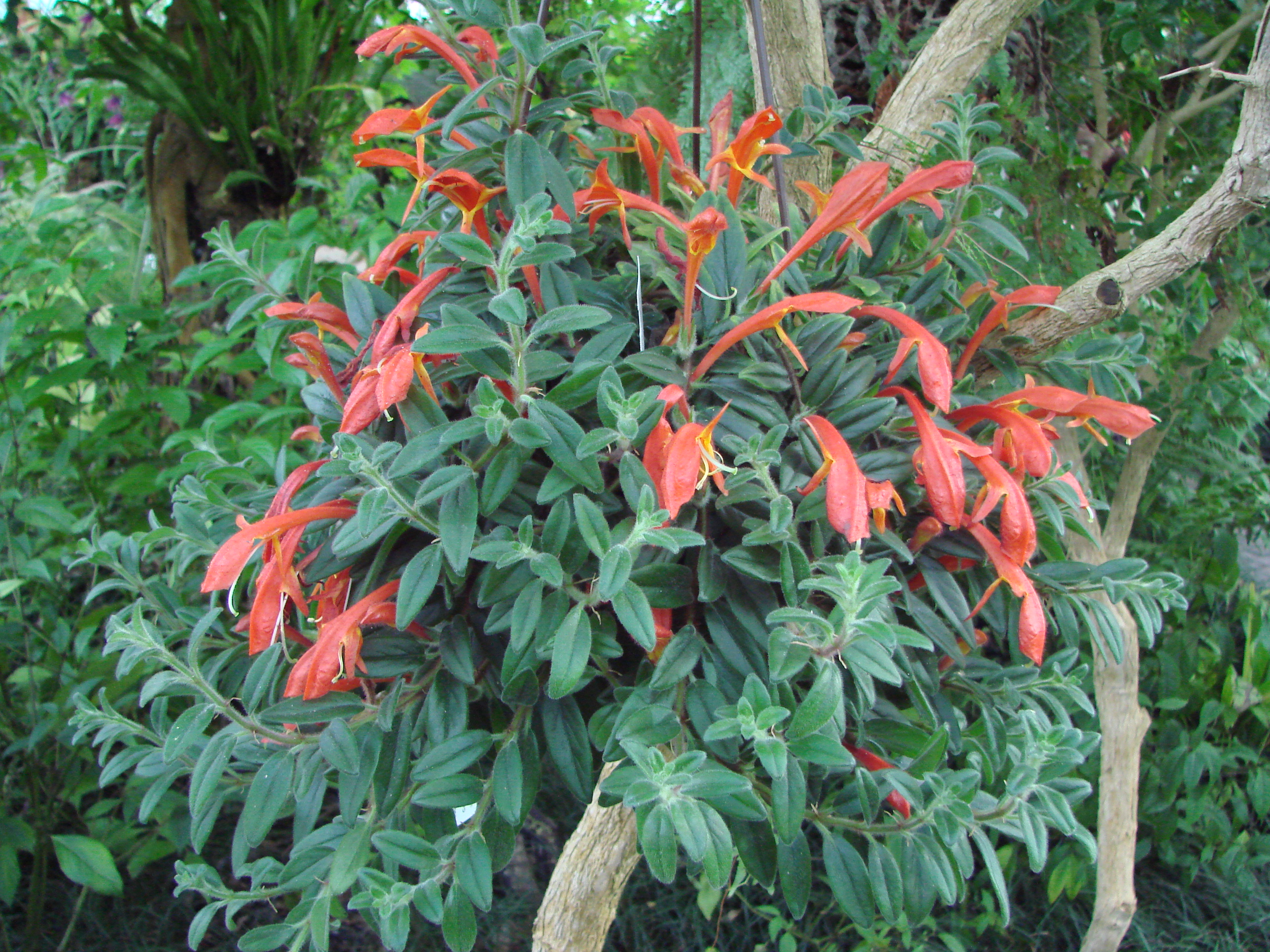
- Columnea hirta habitus
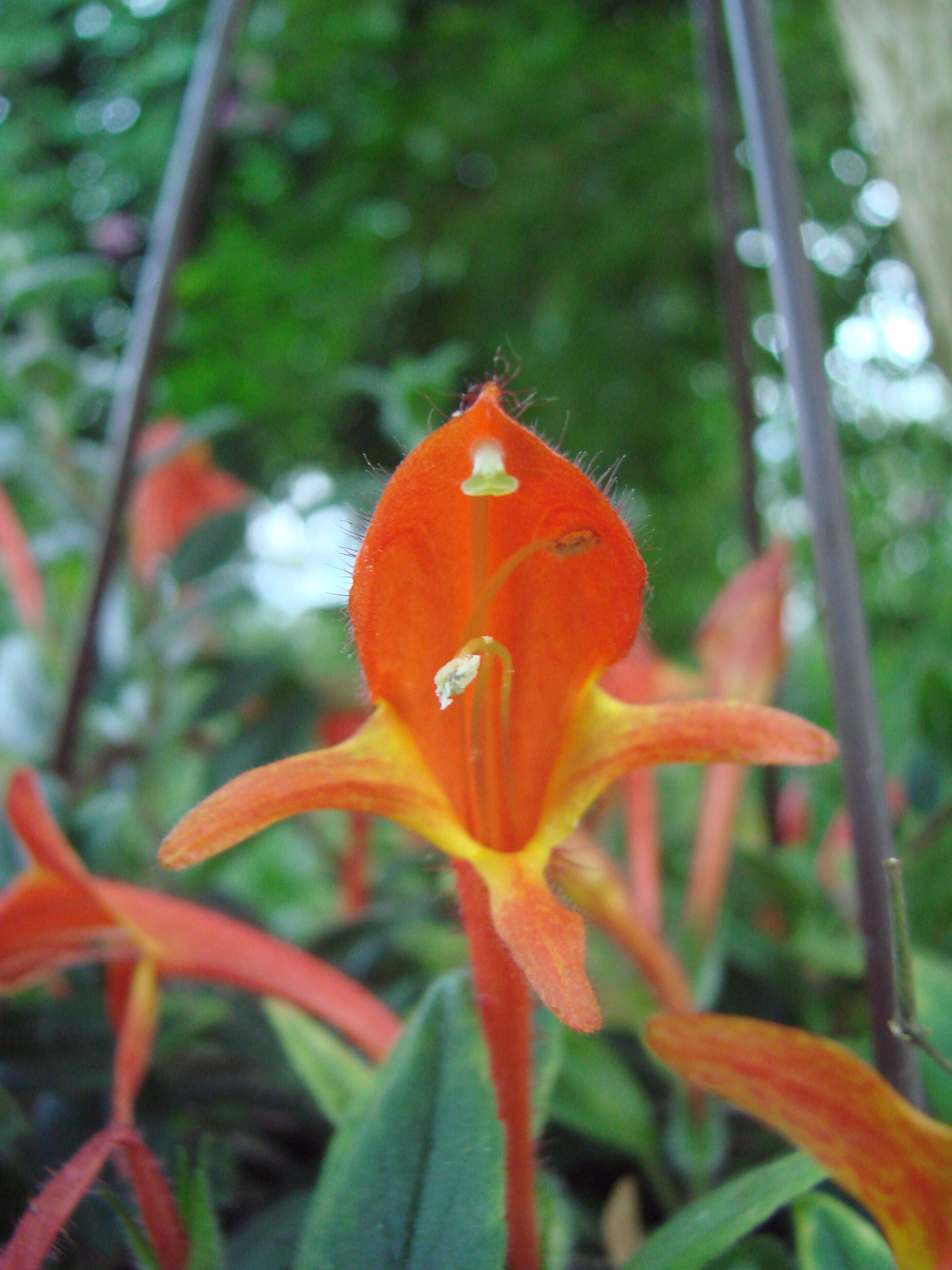
- Columnea hirta inflorescence

Scientific classification
- Kingdom: Plantae
- Clade: Tracheophytes
- Clade: Angiosperms
- Clade: Eudicots
- Clade: Asterids
- Order: Lamiales
- Family: Gesneriaceae
- Genus: Columnea
- Species: C. hirta

Binomial name
- Columnea hirta Klotzsch & Hanst.

= Columnea hirta =

Species of flowering plant

Columnea hirta is a species of flowering plants in the genus Columnea. They are endemic to Costa Rica and Panama but are widely cultivated as an ornamental.

== Description ==
Columnea hirta grows to a maximum height of 3 ft (0.91 m). Their trailing stems are covered with small red hairs. Their velvety leaves are dark green in color and ovate in shape. The profuse tubular flowers are orange to red-orange in color. They are 8 cm (3.1 in) in length and bloom all throughout the year.

== Distribution and habitat ==
Columnea hirta is epiphytic. They are endemic to Costa Rica and Panama but are widely cultivated as an ornamental.

== Taxonomy ==
Columnea hirta was first described by the German botanists Johann Friedrich Klotzsch and Johannes von Hanstein in 1865. It is classified under the genus Columnea of the family Gesneriaceae.
