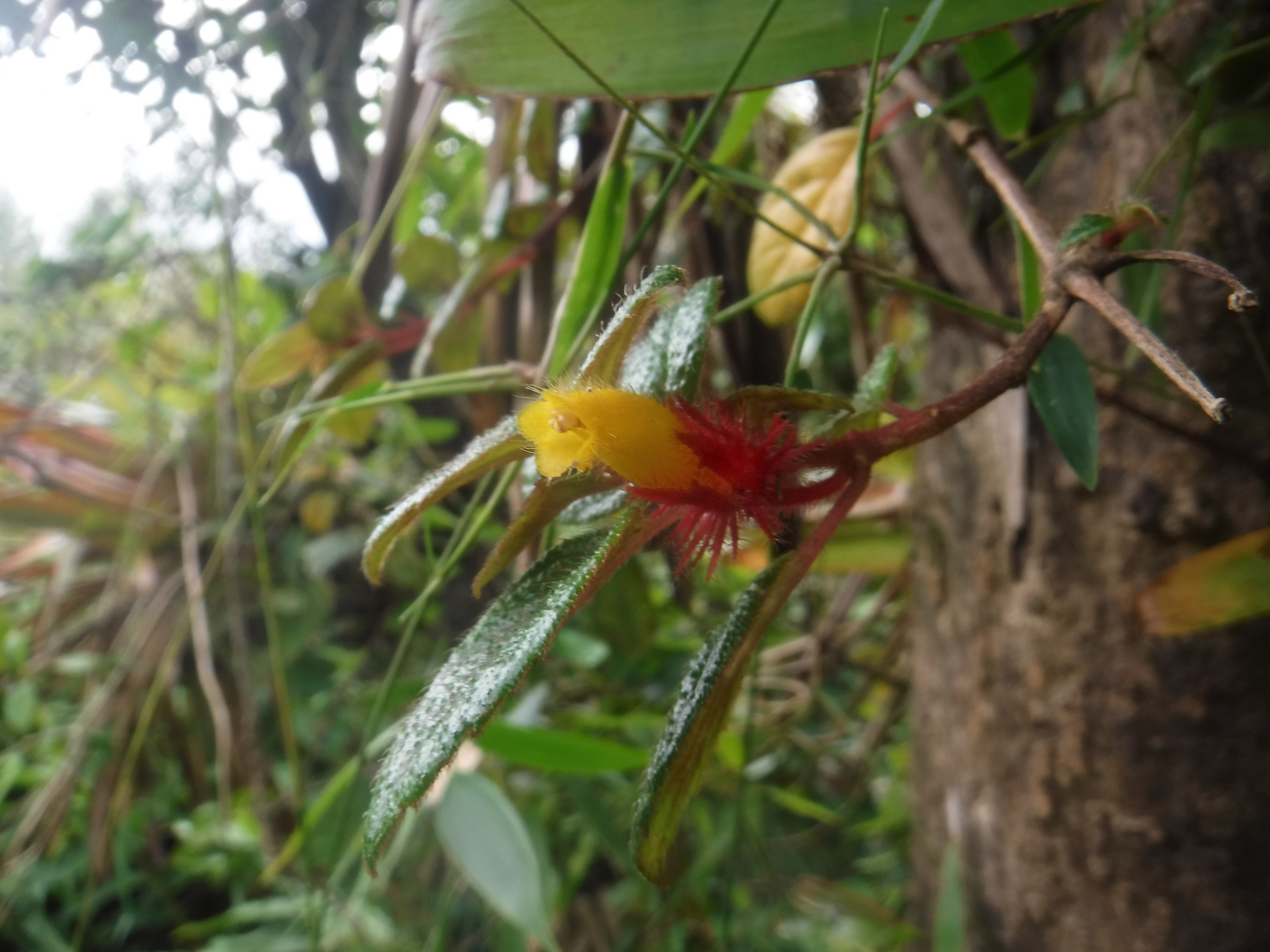

Scientific classification
- Kingdom: Plantae
- Clade: Tracheophytes
- Clade: Angiosperms
- Clade: Eudicots
- Clade: Asterids
- Order: Lamiales
- Family: Gesneriaceae
- Genus: Columnea
- Species: C. domingensis

Binomial name
- Columnea domingensis (Urb.) B.D. Morley

= Columnea domingensis =

Species of flowering plant

Columnea domingensis is a species of plant in the family Gesneriaceae. According to Liogier, it can be found in the Dominican Republic and Haiti.

== Etymology ==
The species has been given the specific epithet "domingensis," as it occurs on the island of Hispaniola. This island was historically called Santo Domingo or Saint-Domingue.
