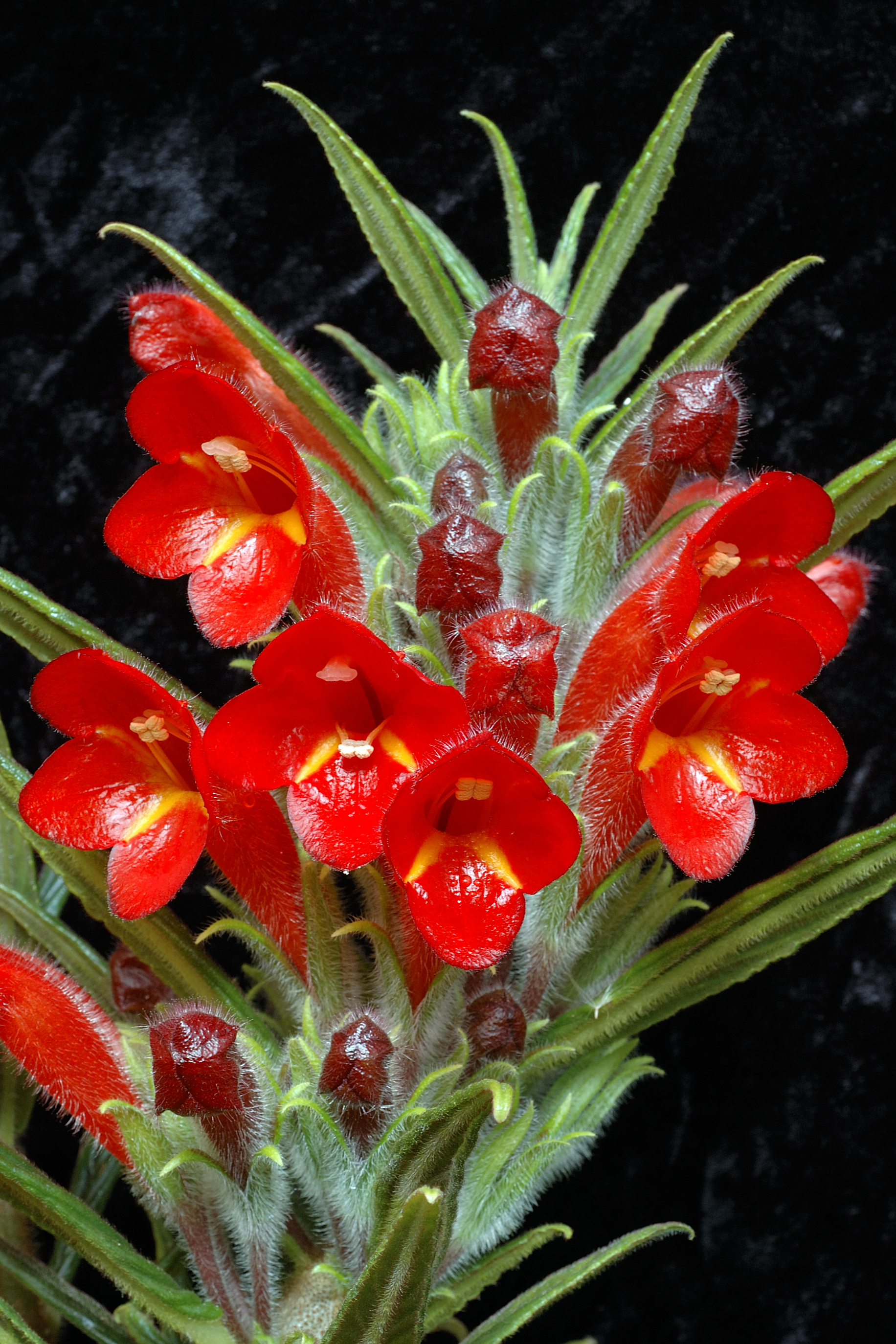

Conservation status
- Endangered (IUCN 3.1)

Scientific classification
- Kingdom: Plantae
- Clade: Tracheophytes
- Clade: Angiosperms
- Clade: Eudicots
- Clade: Asterids
- Order: Lamiales
- Family: Gesneriaceae
- Genus: Columnea
- Species: C. flexiflora

Binomial name
- Columnea flexiflora L.P. Kvist & L.E. Skog

Synonyms
- Trichantha dodsonii Wiehler

= Columnea flexiflora =

Species of flowering plant

Columnea flexiflora is a species of flowering plant in family Gesneriaceae. It is an epiphyte endemic to Ecuador. It is known only from the Cordillera de Cutucú, where it grows in montane tropical rain forest from 1,500 to 2,000 meters elevation. The IUCN Red List assesses the species as Endangered.
