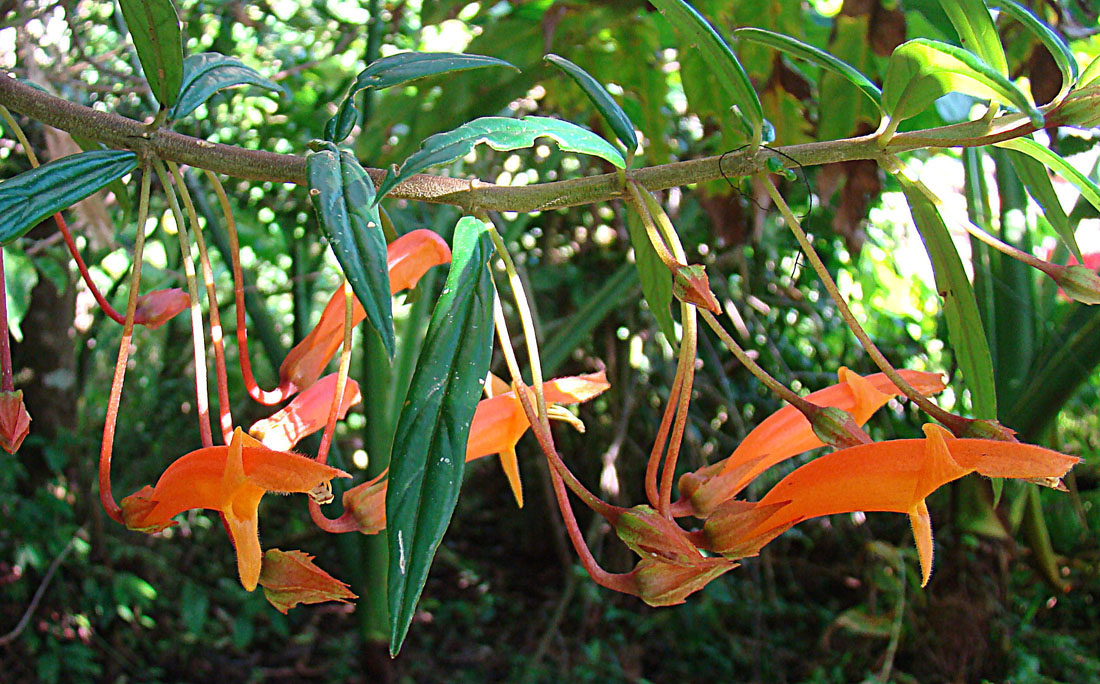

Scientific classification
- Kingdom: Plantae
- Clade: Tracheophytes
- Clade: Angiosperms
- Clade: Eudicots
- Clade: Asterids
- Order: Lamiales
- Family: Gesneriaceae
- Genus: Columnea
- Species: C. rubricaulis

Binomial name
- Columnea rubricaulis Standl. 1936

Synonyms
- Columnea filipendula Wiehler

= Columnea rubricaulis =

Species of flowering plant

Columnea rubricaulis is a species of Gesneriaceae that is native to Honduras and Nicaragua.
