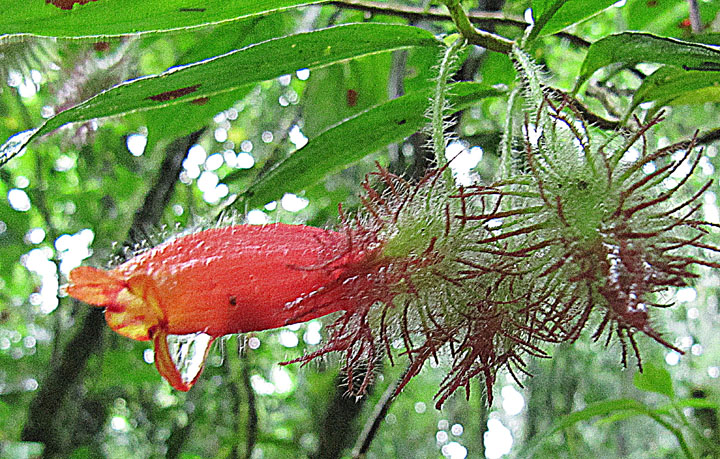

Scientific classification
- Kingdom: Plantae
- Clade: Tracheophytes
- Clade: Angiosperms
- Clade: Eudicots
- Clade: Asterids
- Order: Lamiales
- Family: Gesneriaceae
- Genus: Columnea
- Species: C. sanguinolenta

Binomial name
- Columnea sanguinolenta (Klotzsch ex Oerst.) Hanst. 1865

= Columnea sanguinolenta =

Species of flowering plant

Columnea sanguinolenta is a species of Gesneriaceae that is native to Colombia, Costa Rica, and Panama.
