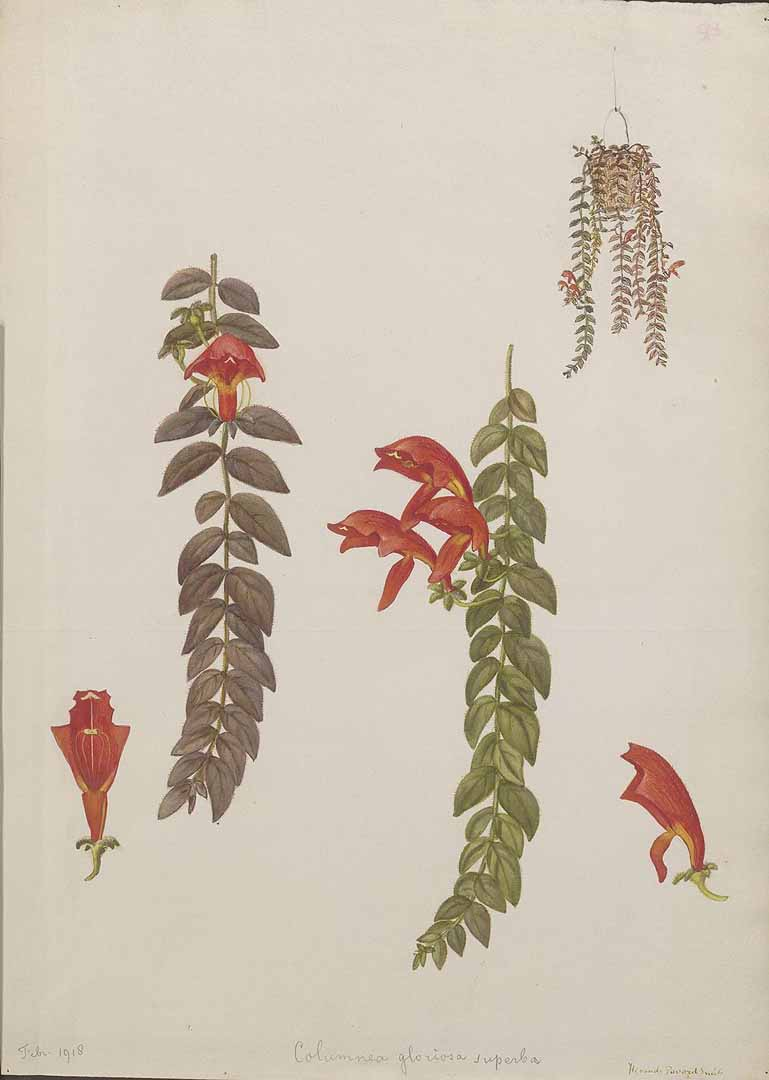
- Botanical illustration

Scientific classification
- Kingdom: Plantae
- Clade: Tracheophytes
- Clade: Angiosperms
- Clade: Eudicots
- Clade: Asterids
- Order: Lamiales
- Family: Gesneriaceae
- Genus: Columnea
- Species: C. microcalyx

Binomial name
- Columnea microcalyx Hanst.

Synonyms
- List: Columnea gloriosa Sprague; Columnea localis C.V.Morton; Columnea lutea Donn.Sm.; Columnea microcalyx var. macrophylla Donn.Sm.; Columnea salmonea Raymond; Columnea tuerckheimii Sprague

= Columnea microcalyx =

Species of plant

Columnea microcalyx, called the goldfish plant or orange columnea, is a species of flowering plant in the genus Columnea, native to southeast Mexico, Central America, Colombia and Venezuela. Its cultivar 'Superba' has gained the Royal Horticultural Society's Award of Garden Merit.
