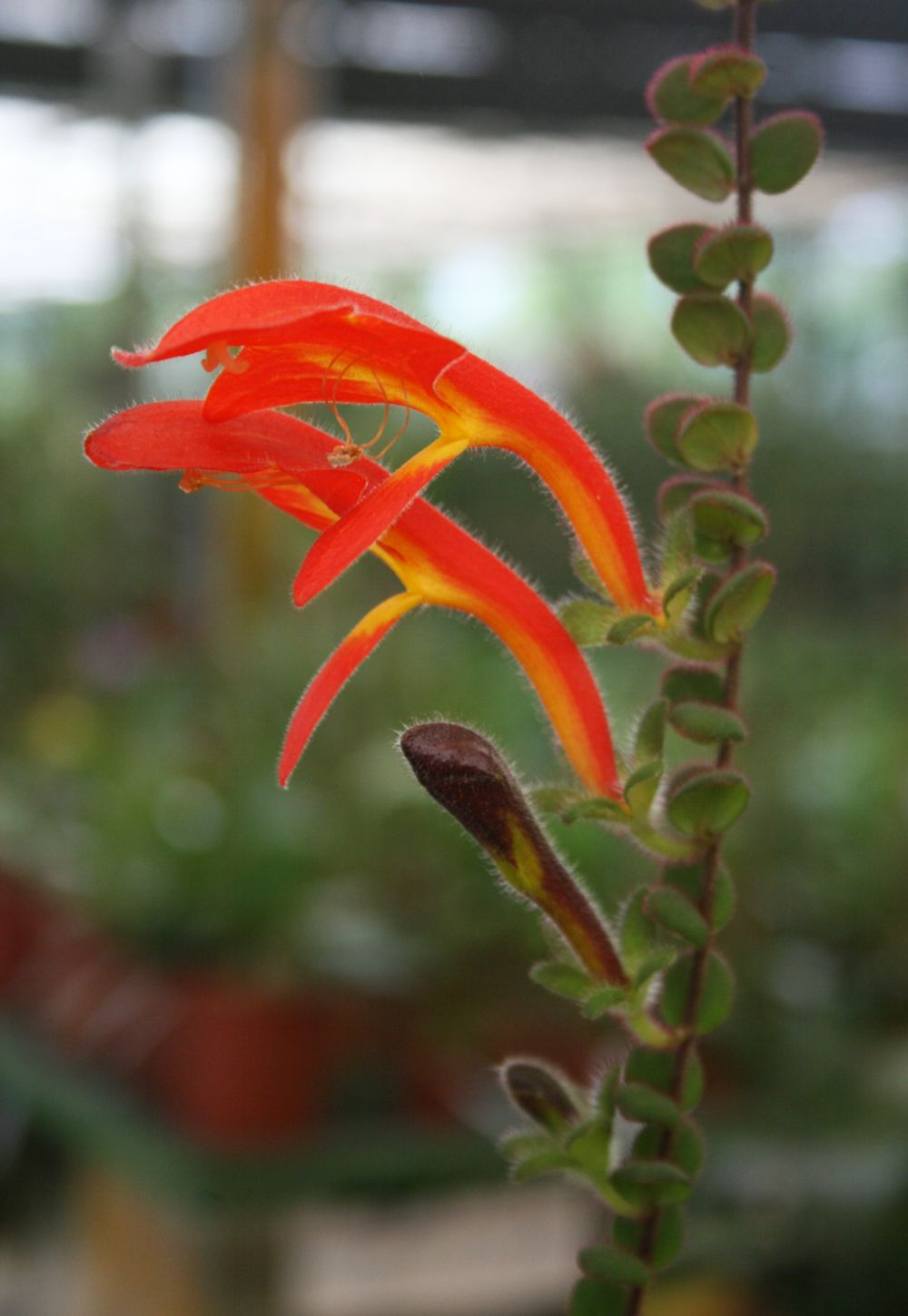

Scientific classification
- Kingdom: Plantae
- Clade: Tracheophytes
- Clade: Angiosperms
- Clade: Eudicots
- Clade: Asterids
- Order: Lamiales
- Family: Gesneriaceae
- Genus: Columnea
- Species: C. microphylla

Binomial name
- Columnea microphylla Klotzsch & Hanst. ex Oerst. 1858

= Columnea microphylla =

Species of flowering plant

Columnea microphylla is a species of Gesneriaceae that is native to Costa Rica.
