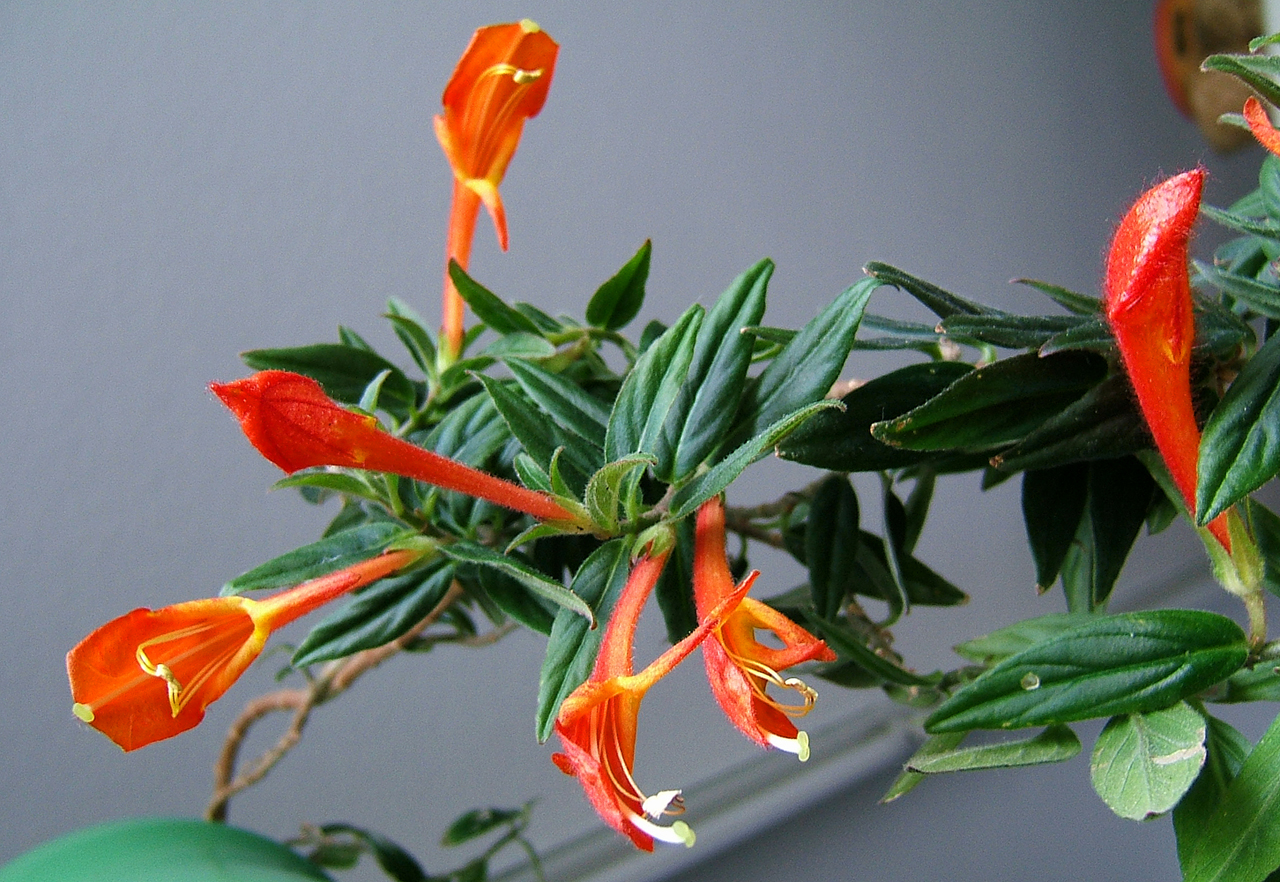

Scientific classification
- Kingdom: Plantae
- Clade: Tracheophytes
- Clade: Angiosperms
- Clade: Eudicots
- Clade: Asterids
- Order: Lamiales
- Family: Gesneriaceae
- Genus: Columnea
- Species: C. crassifolia

Binomial name
- Columnea crassifolia Brongn.

= Columnea crassifolia =

Species of flowering plant

Columnea crassifolia is a species of Gesneriaceae that is native to Honduras and Mexico.
