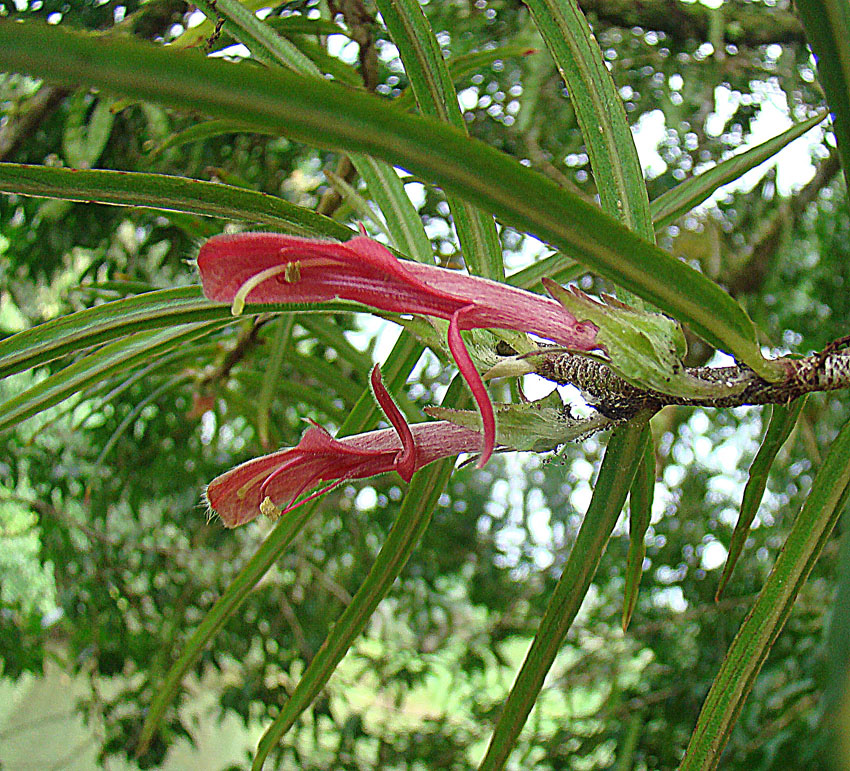

Scientific classification
- Kingdom: Plantae
- Clade: Tracheophytes
- Clade: Angiosperms
- Clade: Eudicots
- Clade: Asterids
- Order: Lamiales
- Family: Gesneriaceae
- Genus: Columnea
- Species: C. linearis

Binomial name
- Columnea linearis Oerst. 1858

= Columnea linearis =

Species of flowering plant

Columnea linearis is a species of Gesneriaceae that is native to Costa Rica, Nicaragua, and Belize.
