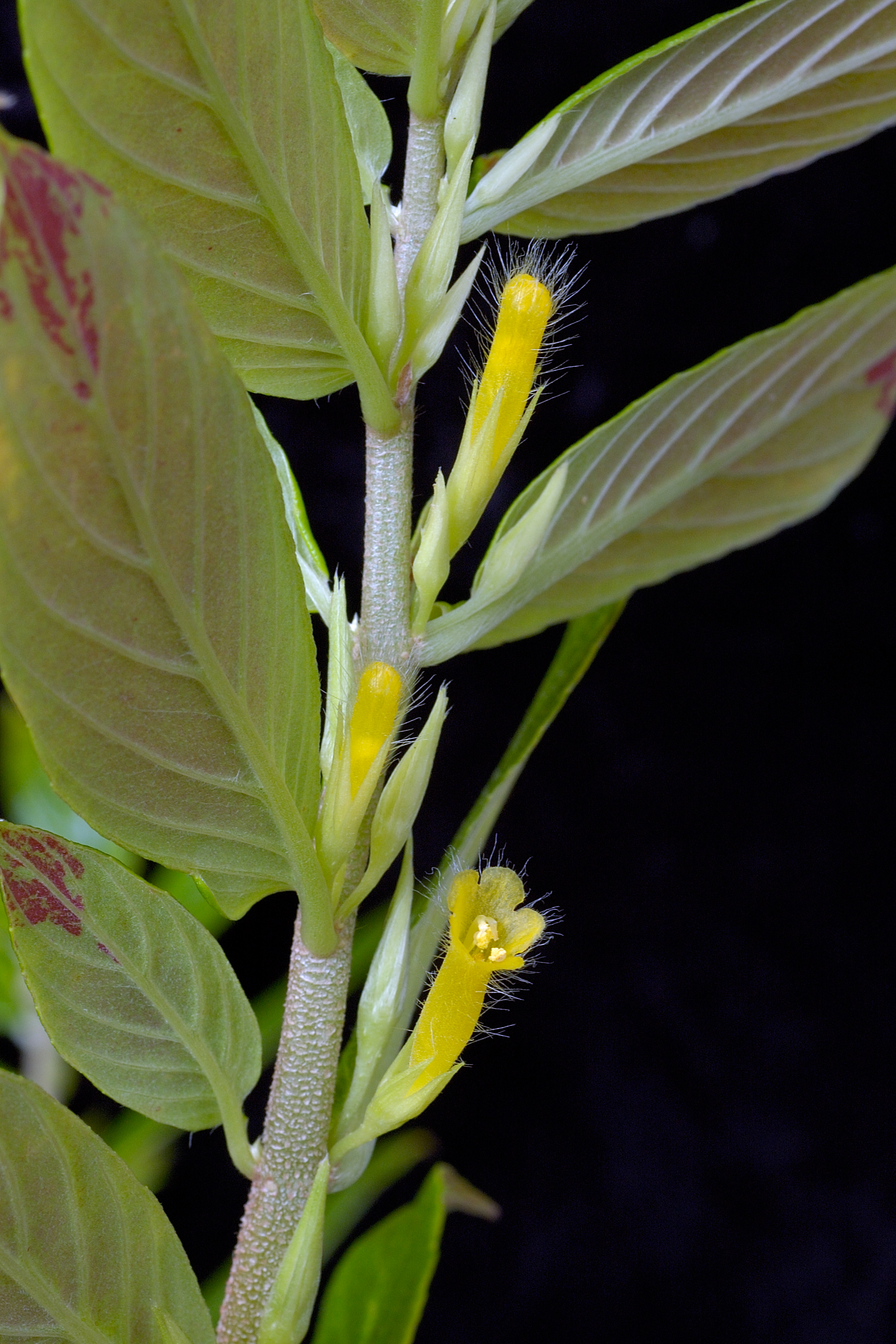

Scientific classification
- Kingdom: Plantae
- Clade: Tracheophytes
- Clade: Angiosperms
- Clade: Eudicots
- Clade: Asterids
- Order: Lamiales
- Family: Gesneriaceae
- Genus: Columnea
- Species: C. orientandina

Binomial name
- Columnea orientandina (Wiehler) L.P. Kvist & L.E. Skog

= Columnea orientandina =

Species of flowering plant

Columnea orientandina is a plant species from Ecuador. It has leaves which are mostly green with a red coloured tip.
