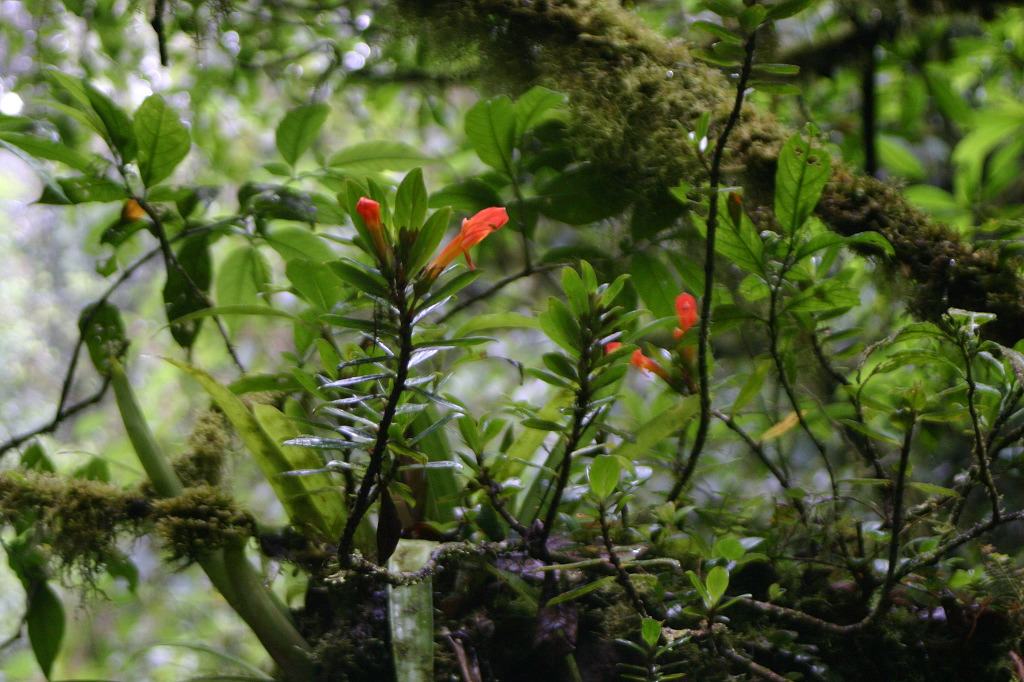

Scientific classification
- Kingdom: Plantae
- Clade: Tracheophytes
- Clade: Angiosperms
- Clade: Eudicots
- Clade: Asterids
- Order: Lamiales
- Family: Gesneriaceae
- Genus: Columnea
- Species: C. glabra

Binomial name
- Columnea glabra Oerst.

= Columnea glabra =

Species of epiphyte

Columnea glabra is a species of plant that may be found growing in montane cloud forest habitats in Central and South America. It commonly grows as an epiphyte.
