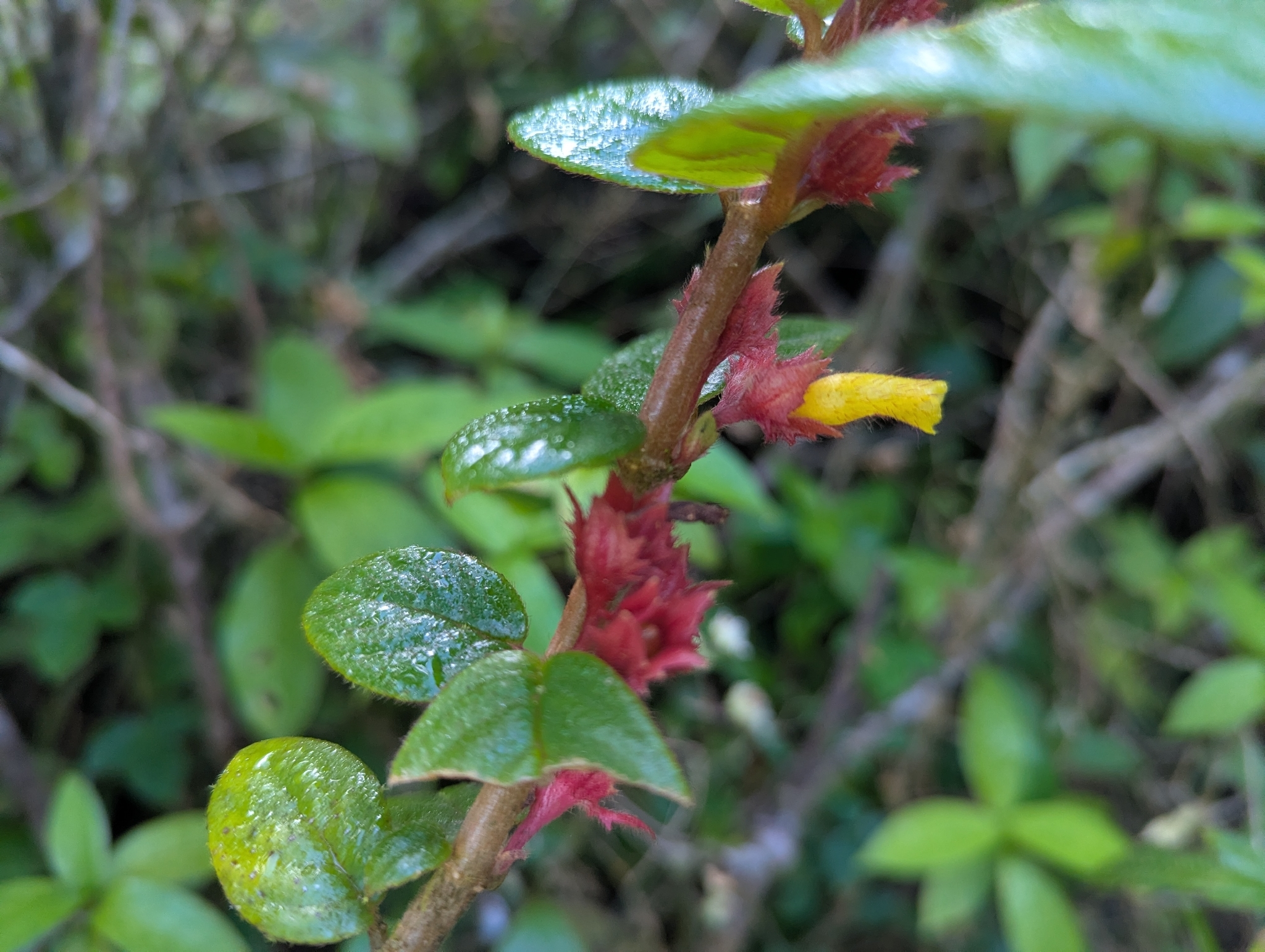

Conservation status
- Near Threatened (IUCN 3.1)

Scientific classification
- Kingdom: Plantae
- Clade: Tracheophytes
- Clade: Angiosperms
- Clade: Eudicots
- Clade: Asterids
- Order: Lamiales
- Family: Gesneriaceae
- Genus: Columnea
- Species: C. ambigua

Binomial name
- Columnea ambigua (Urb.) B.D.Morley

Synonyms
- Alloplectus ambiguus Urb.; Crantzia ambigua (Urb.) Britton; Ortholoma ambiguum (Urb.) Wiehler; Trichantha ambigua (Urb.) Wiehler

= Columnea ambigua =

Species of flowering plant

Columnea ambigua, also known as tibey de cresta, is a species of epiphytic shrub endemic to the island of Puerto Rico. It adheres to rocks in humid premontane and montane forests such as El Yunque.

== Description ==
Columnea ambigua has glossy, green, egg-shaped leaves and yellow flowers with green or red calyxes, supported by slender pedicels. The floral morphology is assumed to be adaptive for hummingbird pollination. The pollinated plant produces spherical, snow-white berries each around 7 mm in diameter. Tibey de Cresta is distinguished from other Columnea species by the ratio between the length of the corolla tube and the length of the corolla lobe.

== Etymology ==
The genus was named by Carl Linnaeus for the 16th-century Italian botanist Fabio Colonna with the Latinized spelling Fabius Columnus. The specific epithet ambigua comes from the Latin word ambiguus, meaning doubtful or uncertain.

== Conservation ==
Tibey de Cresta was identified as a conservation concern by Miller et al. (2013), who gave it a provisional global rank of Near Threatened using the IUCN Red List criteria.
