= Columnea florida =

Scientific classification
- Kingdom: Plantae
- Clade: Tracheophytes
- Clade: Angiosperms
- Clade: Eudicots
- Clade: Asterids
- Order: Lamiales
- Family: Gesneriaceae
- Genus: Columnea
- Species: C. florida

Binomial name
- Columnea florida C.V.Morton

Species of plant

Columnea florida is an epiphytic plant of the family Gesneriaceae and native to the neotropics. It was described in 1937 by C. V. Morton. It is also known as Dalbergaria florida.

== Description ==
As the flowers begin to develop, the leaves nearest to the inflorescences develop a pair of dime-size red spots near the far end of each leaf to guide hummingbirds to the flowers, thus belatedly becoming bracts.
