= Johannes von Hanstein =

German botanist

Johannes Ludwig Emil Robert von Hanstein (15 May 1822 – 27 August 1880) was a German botanist who was a native of Potsdam.

He attended classes at the Gärtnerlehranstalt (Institute of Horticulture) in Potsdam, and later studied sciences in Berlin, obtaining his doctorate in 1848. In 1855 he was a lecturer of botany at the University of Berlin, and six years later became curator of the royal herbarium. In 1865 he was appointed professor of botany at the University of Bonn and director of the botanical garden.

Hanstein is remembered for studies in plant anatomy and morphology. In 1868 he introduced the "histogen theory" to explain shoot apex behaviour in plants. With his close friend, Nathanael Pringsheim (1823–1894), he conducted pioneer research on the fertilization process in ferns.

The plant genus Hansteinia of the family Acanthaceae is named after him.

== Gallery ==
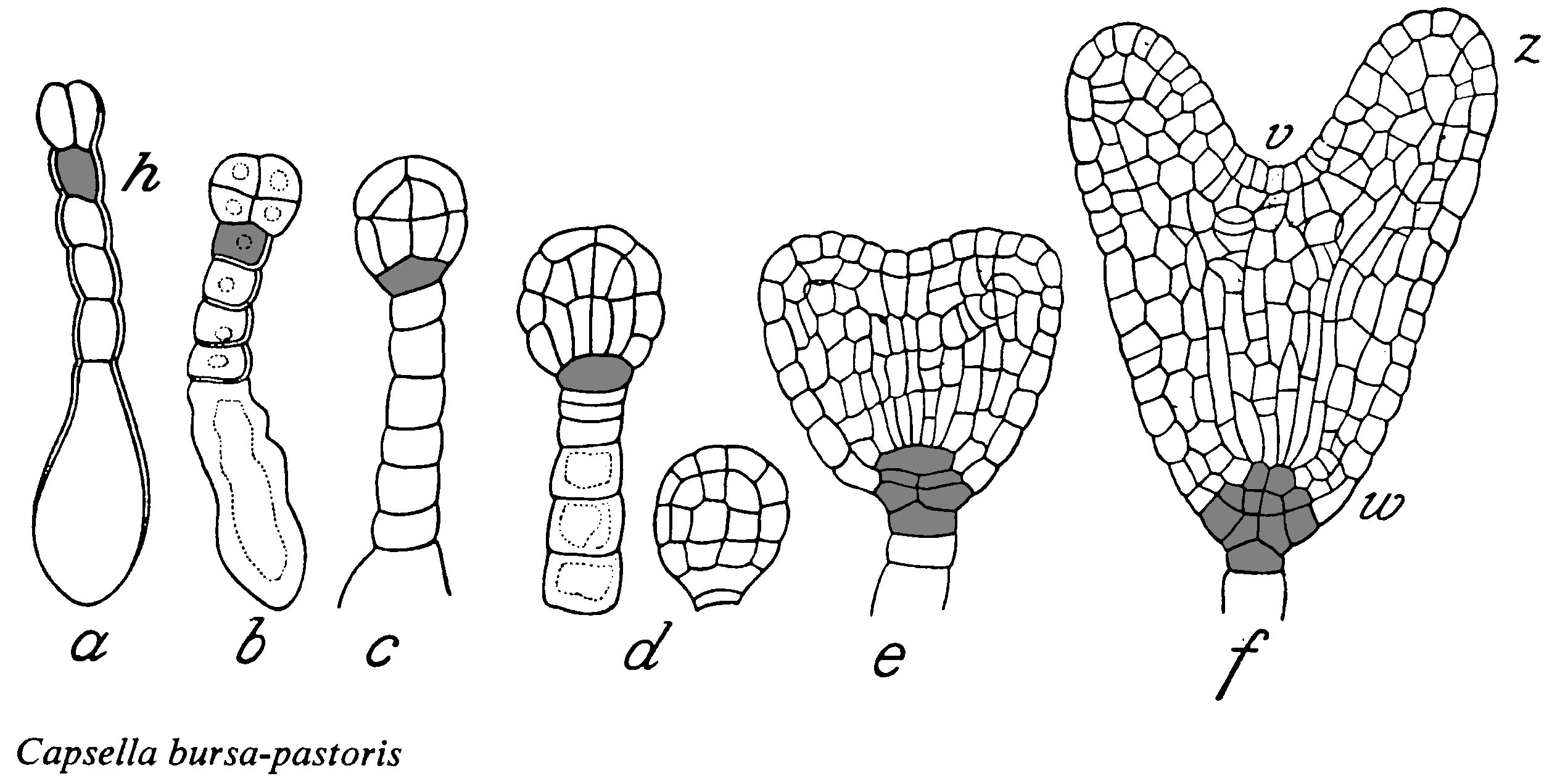
Capsella bursa-pastoris drawing by Johannes von Hanstein

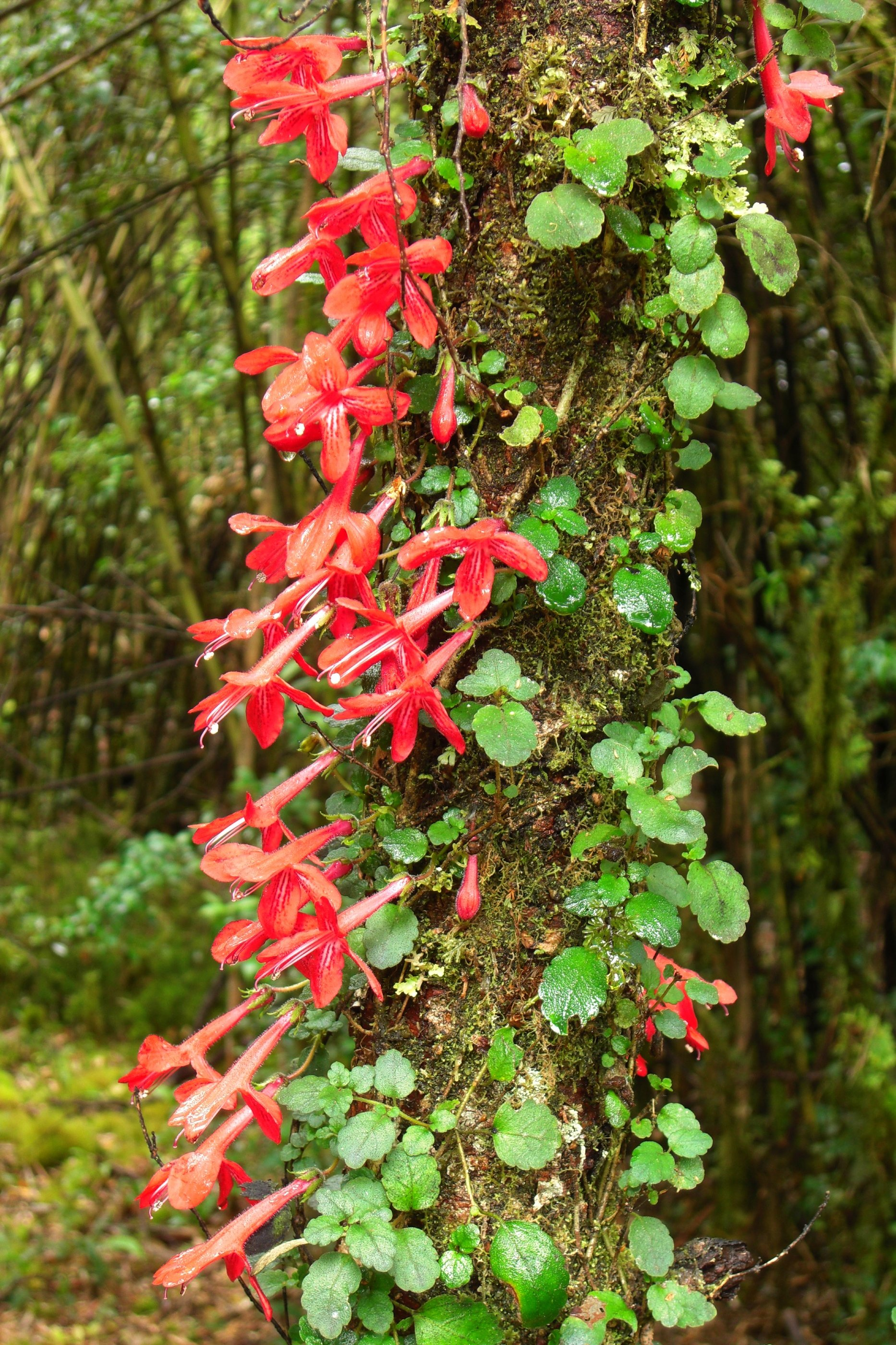
Asteranthera ovata , (Cav.) Hanst. in the Puyehue National Park

== Selected publications ==
- Untersuchungen über den Bau und die Entwickelung der Baumrinde (Studies on the construction and development of tree bark) (1853).
- Die Milchsaftgefässe und die verwandten Organe der Rinde, (1864).
- Die Scheitelzellgruppe im Vegetationspunkt der Phanerogamen (The cortex cell group in the growth-point of phanerogams), (1869).
- Die Entwicklung des Keimes der Monokotylen und Dikotylen (Development involving germination of monocotyls and dicots), (1870).

He was also an editor of the journal Botanische Abhandlungen aus dem Gebiete der Morphologie und Physiologie (Botanical treatises from the areas of morphology and physiology). Example :

- With Ernst Pfitzer. Untersuchungen über Bau und Entwicklung der Bacillariaceen (Diatomaceen), (1871) : Read online
