= Fabio Colonna =

Italian scientist (1567–1640)

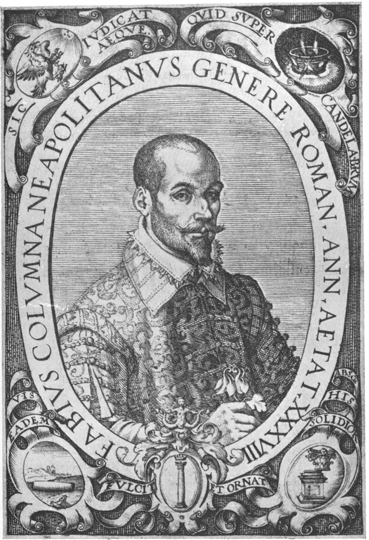
- Fabio Colonna
- Born: 1567; Naples, Italy
- Died: 25 July 1640 (aged 73); Naples, Italy
- Scientific career
- Fields: Naturalist and Botanist

Fabio Colonna (called Linceo; 1567 – 25 July 1640) was an Italian naturalist and botanist.

== Biography ==
He was the son of Girolamo Colonna, a philologist and antique dealer who was also editor of the fragments of the Latin poet Ennius. As a youngster he became proficient in Latin and Greek before attending the University of Naples, where he graduated in law in 1589. He suffered from epilepsy, which prevented him from practicing law, so he turned to studying the ancient authors of medicine, botany and natural history. He noticed numerous errors and omissions in Dioscorides' Materia medica, but his commentary on that work is now lost.

In the period between 1606 and 1616, Colonna studied fossils, finding evidence for their organic origins.

The publication of his first works on botany, such as De purpura made him a celebrity among naturalists and one of the first members of the Accademia dei Lincei in Naples, which had been founded by Federico Cesi in 1612. In the following years, his academic activity at the Lincei was intense, including the writing of the Apiario and the Tesoro Messicano that the Lincei published in 1625 and 1628.

Colonna became interested in the recently invented telescope and microscope, corresponding with Galileo Galilei and other Lincean academics on astronomy.

In 1625 he published two drawings, Apiarium and Melissographia, regarding bees.

Colonna was also interested in music, inventing a stringed, meantone temperament instrument, the pentecontachordon, having 50 strings in which the octave is divided into 31 parts and the tone into 5 parts.

Colonna was a pupil of Ferrante Imperato and a friend of Giambattista della Porta and Bartolomeo Maranta.

== Selected works ==
- Φυτοβασανος ("Phytobasanos": "Torture of plants"), Naples, 1592.
- Minus cognitarum […]
  - Minus cognitarum rariorumque nostro coelo orientium stirpium εκφρασις, 1616 (Linda Hall Library)
  - Minus cognitarum stirpium pars altera, 1616. Part 2. Includes (p. 85) Erucæ rutaceæ, eiusque chrysalidis & papilionis observatio (Linda Hall Library)
- Ekphrasis altera, Rome, 1616. It contains 156 drawings by Colonna himself as well as two appendices: De Purpura and De glossopetris dissertatio, where Colonna makes an argument in favor of the organic origin of the glossopetrae.
- Purpura, 1616. About Tyrian purple.
- La sambuca lincea, ovvero dell'istromento [sic] musico perfetto, Naples, 1618 (The Lincean sambuca, in other words about the perfect musical instrument), the construction of the pentecontachordon.
- "De glossopetris". In: De corporibus marinis lapidescentibus quae defossa reperiuntur, auctore Augustino Scilla – Addita dissertatione Fabii Columnae De glossopetris, Rome, 1747

== Sources ==
The first version of this text was partially or fully derived from the project Mille anni di scienza in Italia and edited by the Istituto Museo di Storia della Scienza di Firenze. It is released under the Creative Commons License CC-BY-3.0.

== See also ==
- Giovan Battista della Porta
- Niels Stensen
