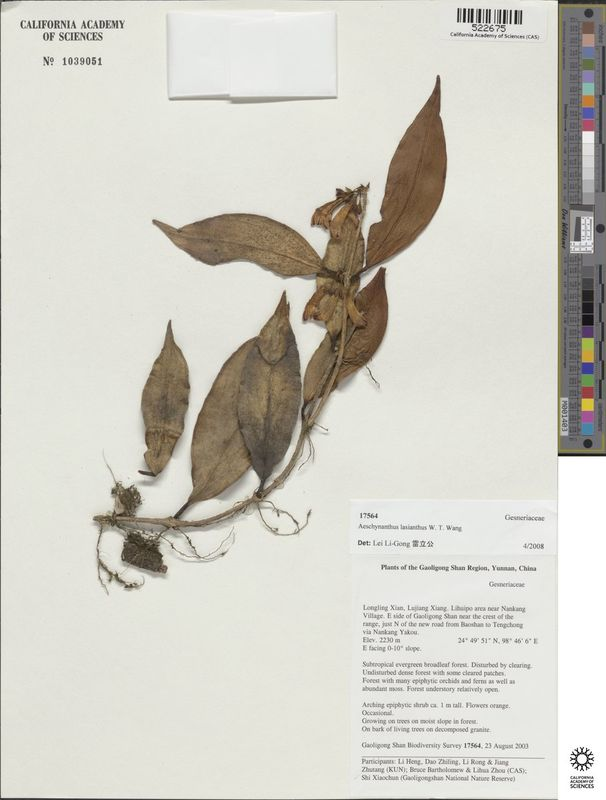

Scientific classification
- Kingdom: Plantae
- Clade: Embryophytes
- Clade: Tracheophytes
- Clade: Spermatophytes
- Clade: Angiosperms
- Clade: Eudicots
- Clade: Asterids
- Order: Lamiales
- Family: Gesneriaceae
- Genus: Aeschynanthus
- Species: A. lasianthus

Binomial name
- Aeschynanthus lasianthus W.T.Wang

= Aeschynanthus lasianthus =

Species of flowering plant

Aeschynanthus lasianthus is a species of flowering plant in the family Gesneriaceae. It is an epiphyte or lithophyte with leathery leaves, red flowers, and capsule fruits. The species is native to Yunnan, China, and was described in 1975.

== Taxonomy ==
The species was described by Wang Wencai in 1975. The description was published in Acta Phytotaxonomica Sinica.

== Distribution ==
Aeschynanthus lasianthus is native to the wet tropical biome of north-west Yunnan, China. The species grows on trees at the margins of forests, and on rocky cliffs beside streams. It is present at elevations of 1,700–2,600 metres (5,600–8,500 ft).

== Description ==
Aeschynanthus lasianthus is an epiphyte or lithophyte. The stems are 40–120 centimetres (16–47 in) long, brown, and silky.

The leaves are arranged oppositely. The leaf stem is 3.5–10 millimetres (0.14–0.39 in) long. The leaves are thin, leathery, narrowly ovate to ovate or elliptical, 2.9–8 centimetres (1.1–3.1 in) long, and 1.4–2.9 centimetres (0.55–1.14 in) wide.

The inflorescence is a cyme with one or two flowers. The inflorescence lacks a stem. The flower stems are 0.8–1.4 centimetres (0.31–0.55 in) long. The calyx is green, 1–1.8 centimetres (0.39–0.71 in) long, and has five lobes. The calyx tube is 3.5–4 millimetres (0.14–0.16 in) wide at the mouth. The corolla is red, and 2.5–2.8 centimetres (0.98–1.10 in) long. The plant flowers from August to September.

The fruit is a capsule around 20 centimetres (7.9 in) long. The plant fruits in September.

== Nomenclature ==
In Chinese, the species is known as 毛花芒毛苣苔 (mao hua mang mao ju tai).
