= Hoya aeschynanthoides =

Scientific classification
- Kingdom: Plantae
- Clade: Tracheophytes
- Clade: Angiosperms
- Clade: Eudicots
- Clade: Asterids
- Order: Gentianales
- Family: Apocynaceae
- Genus: Hoya
- Species: H. aeschynanthoides

Binomial name
- Hoya aeschynanthoides Schltr.

Species of plant

Hoya aeschynanthoides is a species of flowering plant in the dogbane family Apocynaceae, native to Borneo.

== Description ==
Hoya aeschynanthoides is an epiphytic subshrub with slender, thread-like, hanging or decumbent branches and aerial roots. The leaves are broadly ovate to elliptic, pointed at the tip, hairy on both sides, and 1.5 to 2.3 cm long. Small white flowers, about 0.5 cm across, are borne in umbels.

== Distribution and habitat ==
The species is native to Borneo; the type material was collected in flower in August 1901 at Long Deh, in the former Dutch East Indies region of Kutai, in what is now East Kalimantan, Indonesia.

== Taxonomy ==
The species was described by the German botanist Rudolf Schlechter in 1908. Schlechter noted that although the plant resembles Hoya lacunosa Blume at first glance, its foliage instead recalls the genus Aeschynanthus, a comparison recorded directly in the specific epithet.

The name aeschynanthoides combines Aeschynanthus with the Greek suffix -oides ("resembling"), meaning "resembling Aeschynanthus."

== See also ==
- List of Hoya species
