= Aeschynanthus amboinensis =

Scientific classification
- Kingdom: Plantae
- Clade: Tracheophytes
- Clade: Angiosperms
- Clade: Eudicots
- Clade: Asterids
- Order: Lamiales
- Family: Gesneriaceae
- Genus: Aeschynanthus
- Species: A. amboinensis

Binomial name
- Aeschynanthus amboinensis (Merr.) Mendum

Synonyms
- Trichosporum amboinense Merr.

Species of flowering plant

Aeschynanthus amboinensis is a species of flowering plant in the family Gesneriaceae. It is an epiphyte wih crimson flowers and capsule fruits. The species is native to Indonesia, and was described in 1916.

== Taxonomy ==
The species was described by Elmer Drew Merrill in 1916, and placed in the genus Trichosporum. In 1998, Mary Mendum moved it to the genus Aeschynanthus.

== Distribution ==
Aeschynanthus amboinensis is native to the wet tropical biome of Maluku and Sulawesi.

== Description ==
Aeschynanthus amboinensis is an epiphytic subshrub with hanging or trailing stems. The branches are purple and hairy when young, and brown and hairless when older.

The leaves are ovate, hard, thick, arranged oppositely, hairy on both sides, 2.2–4.2 centimetres (0.87–1.65 in) long, 1.3–2.9 centimetres (0.51–1.14 in) wide, and have smooth edges. The leaf stems are 2–5 millimetres (0.079–0.197 in) long.

The inflorescences grow on 3–6 millimetres (0.12–0.24 in) stems, and have several flowers. The flower stems are crimson, and 6–15 millimetres (0.24–0.59 in) long. The calyx is crimson, 8–12 millimetres (0.31–0.47 in) long, tubular, and has white hairs. The corolla is bright crimson, tubular, 2.5–3.4 centimetres (0.98–1.34 in) long, around 4 millimetres (0.16 in) wide at the base, and 7–8 millimetres (0.28–0.31 in) wide at the throat.

The fruit is a 8–17 centimetres (3.1–6.7 in) long capsule.

Aeschynanthus amboinensis is similar to Aeschynanthus dasycalyx and Aeschynanthus praelongus.
