= Aeschynanthus lancilimbus =

Scientific classification
- Kingdom: Plantae
- Clade: Embryophytes
- Clade: Tracheophytes
- Clade: Spermatophytes
- Clade: Angiosperms
- Clade: Eudicots
- Clade: Asterids
- Order: Lamiales
- Family: Gesneriaceae
- Genus: Aeschynanthus
- Species: A. lancilimbus

Binomial name
- Aeschynanthus lancilimbus W.T.Wang

Species of flowering plant

Aeschynanthus lancilimbus is a species of flowering plant in the family Gesneriaceae. It is an epiphyte with leathery to papery leaves, and red flowers. The species is native to Yunnan, China, and was described in 1975.

== Taxonomy ==
The species was described by Wang Wencai in 1975. The description was published in Acta Phytotaxonomica Sinica.

== Distribution ==
Aeschynanthus lancilimbus is native to the subtropical biome of south-east Yunnan, China. It grows in dense forests in valleys, at elevations of around 1,200 metres (3,900 ft).

== Description ==
Aeschynanthus lancilimbus is an epiphytic subshrub. The stems are around 50 centimetres (20 in) long.

The leaves are arranged oppositely, and grow on 3–6 millimetres (0.12–0.24 in) stems. The leaves are lanceolate, or rarely ovate, leathery to papery in texture, 4–6.3 centimetres (1.6–2.5 in) long, and 1.4–2.5 centimetres (0.55–0.98 in) wide.

The flower stems are around 1.3 centimetres (0.51 in) long. The calyx is green, around 7 millimetres (0.28 in) long, and has five lobes. The calyx tube is around 2 millimetres (0.079 in) wide at the mouth. The corolla is red, and around 2.7 centimetres (1.1 in) long. The plant flowers in October.

== Nomenclature ==
In Chinese, the species is known as 披针芒毛苣苔 (pi zhen mang mao ju tai).
