= Aeschynanthus lasiocalyx =

Scientific classification
- Kingdom: Plantae
- Clade: Embryophytes
- Clade: Tracheophytes
- Clade: Spermatophytes
- Clade: Angiosperms
- Clade: Eudicots
- Clade: Asterids
- Order: Lamiales
- Family: Gesneriaceae
- Genus: Aeschynanthus
- Species: A. lasiocalyx

Binomial name
- Aeschynanthus lasiocalyx W.T.Wang

Species of flowering plant

Aeschynanthus lasiocalyx is a species of flowering plant in the family Gesneriaceae. It is an epiphyte with narrowly elliptical leaves, and red flowers. The species is native to Tibet, and was described in 1984.

== Taxonomy ==
The species was described by Wang Wencai in 1984.

== Distribution ==
Aeschynanthus lasiocalyx is native to the subtropical biome of south-east Tibet. The species grows on rocks near riversides in forests, at elevations of around 800 metres (2,600 ft).

== Description ==
Aeschynanthus lasiocalyx is an epiphyte. The stems are around 30 centimetres (12 in) long.

The leaves are arranged oppositely. The leaf stems are 5–9 millimetres (0.20–0.35 in) long. The leaves are narrowly elliptical, papery to thinly leathery in texture, 7–9 centimetres (2.8–3.5 in) long, and 1.8–3.3 centimetres (0.71–1.30 in) wide. The leaf margins are smooth.

The inflorescence is a cyme with around four flowers. The inflorescence lacks a stem, and the flower stems are around 1.2 centimetres (0.47 in) long. The calyx is greenish, around 7 millimetres (0.28 in) long, and has five lobes. The corolla is red, and around 5.8 centimetres (2.3 in) long. The plant flowers in July.

== Nomenclature ==
In Chinese, the species is known as 毛萼芒毛苣苔 (mao e mang mao ju tai).
