= Aeschynanthus acuminatissimus =

Scientific classification
- Kingdom: Plantae
- Clade: Tracheophytes
- Clade: Angiosperms
- Clade: Eudicots
- Clade: Asterids
- Order: Lamiales
- Family: Gesneriaceae
- Genus: Aeschynanthus
- Species: A. acuminatissimus

Binomial name
- Aeschynanthus acuminatissimus W.T.Wang

Species of flowering plant

Aeschynanthus acuminatissimus is a species of flowering plant in the family Gesneriaceae. It is an epiphyte with bright red flowers and capsule fruits. The species is native to China and Vietnam, and was described in 1975.

== Taxonomy ==
The species was described by Wang Wencai in 1975. It has sometimes been confused with Aeschynanthus garrettii.

== Distribution ==
Aeschynanthus acuminatissimus is native to the subtropical biome of China (south-east Yunnan) and Vietnam. It grows on trees in forested valleys, at elevations of 600–2,000 metres (2,000–6,600 ft).

== Description ==
Aeschynanthus acuminatissimus is an epiphytic subshrub. The stems are up to 30 centimetres (12 in) long.

The leaves are arranged oppositely, leathery or fleshy, ellipical or oval-shaped, 1.7–7 centimetres (0.67–2.76 in) long, and 0.7–3.8 centimetres (0.28–1.50 in) wide. The leaves have smooth edges, and grow on 3–6 millimetres (0.12–0.24 in) stems.

The inflorescences have one to three flowers. The inflorescence stem is up to 1 millimetre (0.039 in) long. The flower stems are 14–15 millimetres (0.55–0.59 in) long. The calyx is reddish, and composed of five linear or narrowly ovate lobes, which are 9.5–14.5 millimetres (0.37–0.57 in) long, and 0.9–2 millimetres (0.035–0.079 in) wide. The corolla is bright red, and 30–41 millimetres (1.2–1.6 in) long. The plant flowers in August.

The fruit is a capsule measuring 6–12 centimetres (2.4–4.7 in) long and 3–4 millimetres (0.12–0.16 in) wide. The seeds have one hairlike appendage at each end.

== Nomenclature ==
In Chinese, the species is known as 长尖芒毛苣苔 (chang jian mang mao ju tai).
