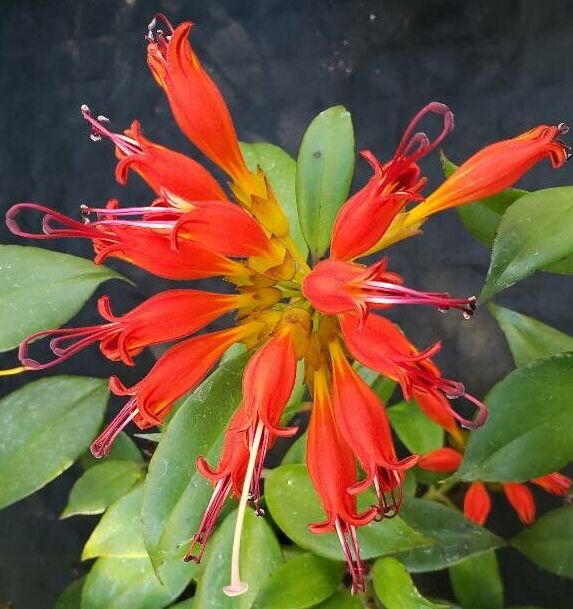

Scientific classification
- Kingdom: Plantae
- Clade: Tracheophytes
- Clade: Angiosperms
- Clade: Eudicots
- Clade: Asterids
- Order: Lamiales
- Family: Gesneriaceae
- Genus: Aeschynanthus
- Species: A. fulgens

Binomial name
- Aeschynanthus fulgens Wall. ex R. Brown

Synonyms
- Trichosporum fulgens (Wall.) Kuntze; Aeschynanthus stenosiphonius W.T. Wang; Aeschynanthus evrardii Pellegr.

= Aeschynanthus fulgens =

Species of epiphyte

Aeschynanthus fulgens is an Asian species of plants in the family Gesneriaceae and tribe Trichosporeae, with no subspecies listed in the Catalogue of Life. A common name for this and similar species in the genus is "lipstick vine"; its name in Vietnamese is má dào Everard.

The plant is a trailing epiphyte, with orange-red flowers approximately 70 mm long and slightly pubescent.
