= Mary Mendum =

Mary Mendum may refer to:

- Mary Mendum (botanist) (1945–2004), British botanist
- Mary Mendum, birth name of Rebecca Brooke (1952–2012), American pornographic actress and model
