= Aeschynanthus leucothamnos =

Scientific classification
- Kingdom: Plantae
- Clade: Embryophytes
- Clade: Tracheophytes
- Clade: Angiosperms
- Clade: Eudicots
- Clade: Asterids
- Order: Lamiales
- Family: Gesneriaceae
- Genus: Aeschynanthus
- Species: A. leucothamnos

Binomial name
- Aeschynanthus leucothamnos Kraenzl.

Synonyms
- Trichosporum leucothamnos (Kraenzl.) Merr.

Species of flowering plant

Aeschynanthus leucothamnos is a species of flowering plant in the family Gesneriaceae. It is an epiphyte native to the Philippines, and was described in 1913.

== Taxonomy ==
The species was described by Friedrich Wilhelm Ludwig Kraenzlin in 1913. Elmer Drew Merrill placed it in the genus Trichosporum, which is a synonym of Aeschynanthus.

== Distribution ==
The species is native to the Philippine island of Mindanao. It grows in the wet tropical biome.

== Description ==
Aeschynanthus leucothamnos is a epiphytic subshrub.
