= Aeschynanthus andersonii =

Scientific classification
- Kingdom: Plantae
- Clade: Tracheophytes
- Clade: Angiosperms
- Clade: Eudicots
- Clade: Asterids
- Order: Lamiales
- Family: Gesneriaceae
- Genus: Aeschynanthus
- Species: A. andersonii

Binomial name
- Aeschynanthus andersonii C.B.Clarke

Synonyms
- Trichosporum andersonii (C.B.Clarke) Kuntze; Aeschynanthus hildebrandtii Hemsl. ex Hook.f.

Species of flowering plant

Aeschynanthus andersonii is a species of flowering plant in the family Gesneriaceae. It is an epiphyte with red flowers and capsule fruits. The species is native to China, Laos, Malaysia, Myanmar, and Thailand, and was described in 1874.

== Taxonomy ==
The species was described by Charles Baron Clarke in 1874.

== Distribution ==
Aeschynanthus andersonii is native to the wet tropical biome of China (Yunnan), Laos, Malaysia, Myanmar, and Thailand. It grows on trees in forested valleys, at elevations of 1,300–1,700 metres (4,300–5,600 ft).

== Description ==
Aeschynanthus andersonii is an epiphytic subshrub. The stems are 10–20 centimetres (3.9–7.9 in) long.

The leaves are obovate, oblong obovate, or elliptical, 0.8–2.2 centimetres (0.31–0.87 in) long, 4–10 millimetres (0.16–0.39 in) wide, leathery, and have smooth edges. The leaves are mostly clustered near the apex of the stem. The leaf stems are 1–4 millimetres (0.039–0.157 in) long.

The inflorescences are cymes with two to five flowers. The flower stems are 7–10 millimetres (0.28–0.39 in) long. The calyx is green and red, and divided into five linear-lanceolate or narrowly triangular segments. The segments are 3–4 millimetres (0.12–0.16 in) long, and around 0.5 millimetres (0.020 in) wide. The corolla is red, and 1.7–2 centimetres (0.67–0.79 in) long. The plant flowers from June to August.

The fruit is a 6–8 centimetres (2.4–3.1 in) long capsule, and has a hairlike appendage at each end. The plant fruits in August.

== Nomenclature ==
In Chinese, the species is known as 轮叶芒毛苣苔 (lun ye mang mao ju tai).
