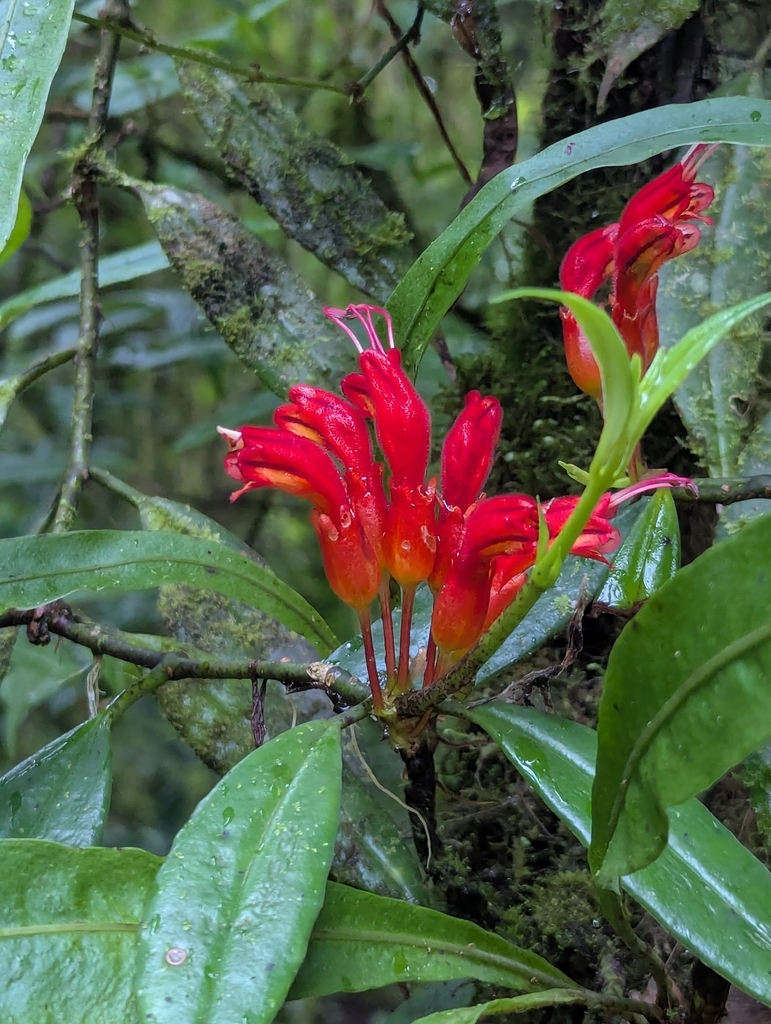

Scientific classification
- Kingdom: Plantae
- Clade: Embryophytes
- Clade: Tracheophytes
- Clade: Spermatophytes
- Clade: Angiosperms
- Clade: Eudicots
- Clade: Asterids
- Order: Lamiales
- Family: Gesneriaceae
- Genus: Aeschynanthus
- Species: A. hookeri

Binomial name
- Aeschynanthus hookeri C.B.Clarke

Synonyms
- Trichosporum hookeri (C.B.Clarke) Kuntze; Aeschynanthus parasiticus C.B.Clarke

= Aeschynanthus hookeri =

Species of flowering plant

Aeschynanthus hookeri is a species of flowering plant in the family Gesneriaceae. It is an epiphyte with leathery leaves, red flowers, and capsule fruits. The species is native to India, Bangladesh, China, Myanmar, and Nepal. It was described in 1883.

== Taxonomy ==
The species was described by Charles Baron Clarke in 1883.

== Distribution ==
Aeschynanthus hookeri is native to the wet tropical biome of India (Assam, Bangladesh, China (north-west and south Yunnan), Myanmar, and Nepal. It grows on trees in montane forests, at elevations of 1,200–2,100 metres (3,900–6,900 ft).

== Description ==
Aeschynanthus hookeri is an epiphytic subshrub. The stems are smooth, and around 40 centimetres (16 in) long.

The leaves are arranged oppositely. The leaves are thick and leathery, 7–9 centimetres (2.8–3.5 in) long, 2.3–4 centimetres (0.91–1.57 in) wide, and narrowly elliptic to oblong. The leaf margins are smooth. The leaf stems are 6–10 millimetres (0.24–0.39 in) long.

The inflorescence lacks a stem, and has four to ten flowers. The flowers have 1–1.5 centimetres (0.39–0.59 in) stems. The calyx is red or purple, 1–1.3 centimetres (0.39–0.51 in) long, and has five lobes. The lobes are ovate to broadly triangular, 3–7 millimetres (0.12–0.28 in) long, and 2.2–3.2 millimetres (0.087–0.126 in) wide. The calyx tube is 5–6 millimetres (0.20–0.24 in) wide at the mouth. The corolla is scarlet to orange-scarlet, and 2.5–3 centimetres (0.98–1.18 in) long. The plant flowers in July.

The fruit is a capsule around 30 centimetres (12 in) long. The seeds have three hair-like appendages.

== Nomenclature ==
In Chinese, the species is known as 束花芒毛苣苔 (shu hua mang mao ju tai).
