= Aeschynanthus intraflavus =

Scientific classification
- Kingdom: Plantae
- Clade: Embryophytes
- Clade: Tracheophytes
- Clade: Spermatophytes
- Clade: Angiosperms
- Clade: Eudicots
- Clade: Asterids
- Order: Lamiales
- Family: Gesneriaceae
- Genus: Aeschynanthus
- Species: A. intraflavus

Binomial name
- Aeschynanthus intraflavus Mendum

Species of flowering plant

Aeschynanthus intraflavus is a species of flowering plant in the family Gesneriaceae. It is an epiphyte with thick, leathery leaves, reddish-orange flowers, and capsule fruits. The species is native to the Maluku Islands, and was described in 1998.

== Taxonomy ==
The species was described by Mary Mendum in 1998. The type specimen was collected from a fallen tree in Manusela National Park, on Seram Island.

== Distribution ==
Aeschynanthus intraflavus is native to the wet tropical biome of Maluku.

== Description ==
Aeschynanthus intraflavus is an epiphytic subshrub. The stems are scrambling, trailing, and up to 3 metres (9.8 ft) long. The branches are up to 80 centimetres (2.6 ft) long, light green when young, and become brown with age.

The leaves are arranged oppositely, thick, leathery, 4–7.5 centimetres (1.6–3.0 in) long, and 1.1–3.2 centimetres (0.43–1.26 in) wide. The leaves are narrowly to broadly elliptical, and have smooth margins. The leaf stems are 6–10 millimetres (0.24–0.39 in) long. The plants have triangular bracts.

The inflorescences have one or two flowers. The flower stems are light green or orange, and 5–6 millimetres (0.20–0.24 in) long. The calyx has pale green lobes, which are orange towards the apex, narrowly linear, and 5–6 millimetres (0.20–0.24 in) long. The corolla is tube-shaped, reddish-orange on the outside, and pale yellow on the inside. The corolla is around 2.2–2.6 centimetres (0.87–1.02 in) long, around 1.5 millimetres (0.059 in) wide at the base, and around 4 millimetres (0.16 in) wide at the mouth. The flowers have four stamens.

The fruit is a linear-cylindric capsule, up to 20.2 centimetres (8.0 in) long, and up to 0.3 centimetres (0.12 in) wide. The fruits have numerous seeds, which are around 1.5 millimetres (0.059 in) long. The seeds have small protuberances, nine hairs at one end, and one hair at the other end.

Aeschynanthus intraflavus appears similar to Aeschynanthus arfakensis, although the latter has orange-yellow flowers, which are purpish towards the apex.
