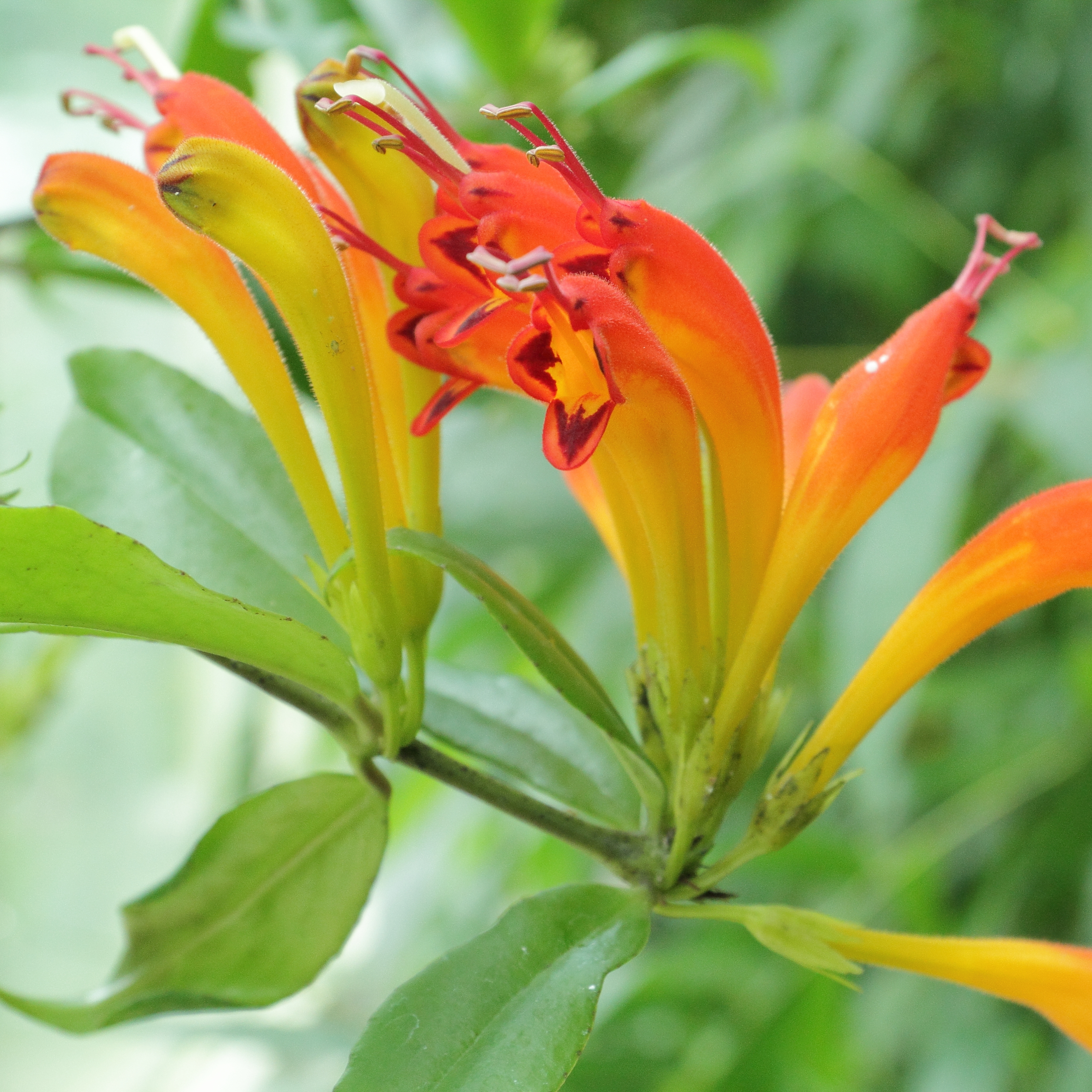

Scientific classification
- Kingdom: Plantae
- Clade: Tracheophytes
- Clade: Angiosperms
- Clade: Eudicots
- Clade: Asterids
- Order: Lamiales
- Family: Gesneriaceae
- Genus: Aeschynanthus
- Species: A. speciosus

Binomial name
- Aeschynanthus speciosus Hook.

Synonyms
- Aeschynanthus aucklandiae H.Low; Aeschynanthus splendens Lindl. & Paxton

= Aeschynanthus speciosus =

Species of flowering plant

Aeschynanthus speciosus, also known as the basket plant, is a species of flowering plant in the family Gesneriaceae. There are many species of Aeschynanthus, many of which have long, trailing stems and bright flowers. The large, fleshy, dark green leaves are up to 10 cm (4 in) long and 4 cm (1 1/2 in) wide and are arranged in groups along the stems. The flowers can be as long as 10 cm (4 in) and grow in clusters that usually consist of 6–20 flowers. Most of the time they are shaded in different colors, from orange–yellow in the lower area to orange–red at the tip with a blotched red inside and a yellow streaked throat.

With a minimum temperature of 8 °C (46 °F), A. speciosus is grown as a houseplant in temperate regions. It is particularly suitable for hanging baskets. It requires bright light but not direct sunlight, does best in humid conditions, and should be potted in a porous, acidic medium.
