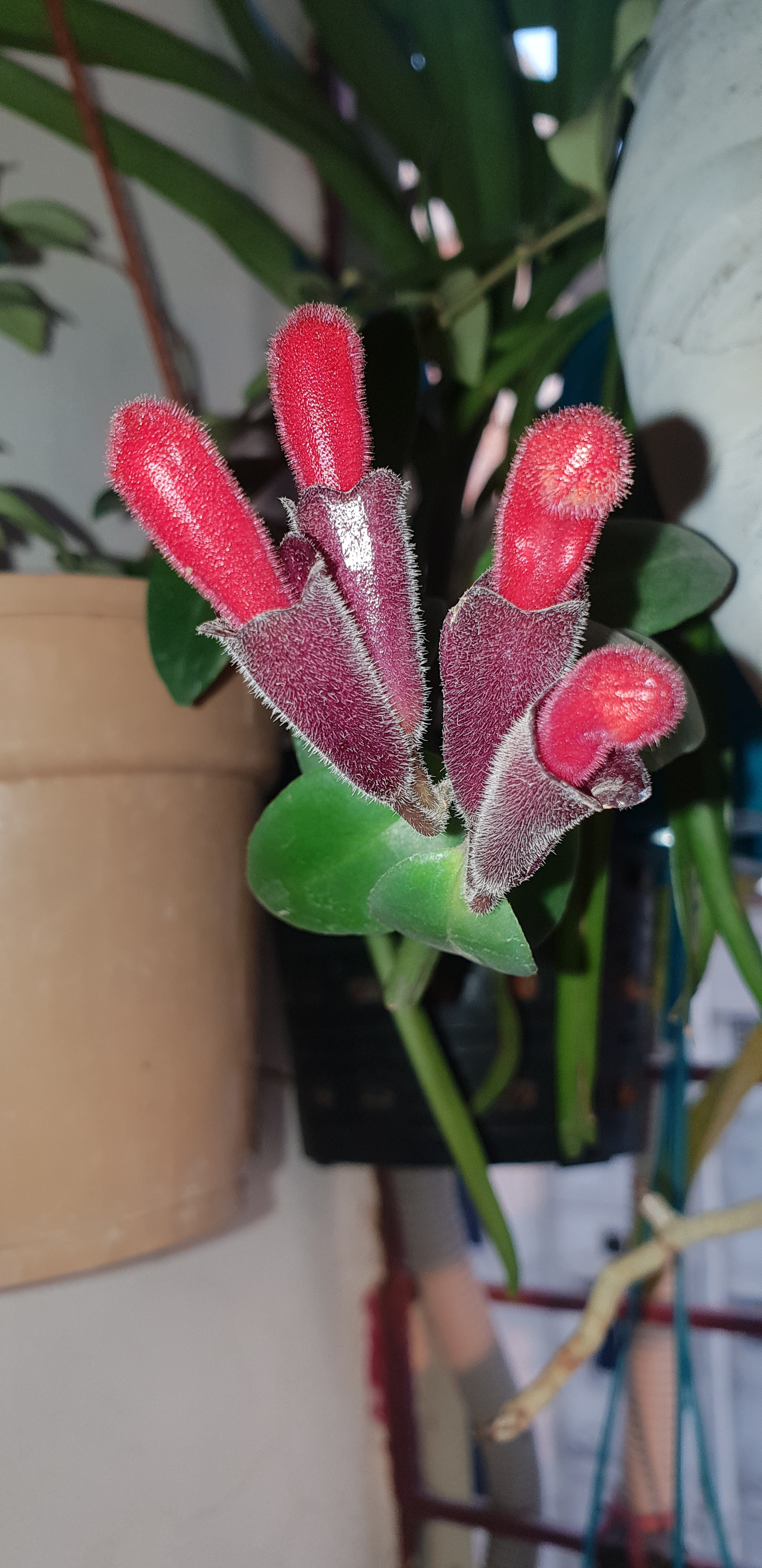

Scientific classification
- Kingdom: Plantae
- Clade: Tracheophytes
- Clade: Angiosperms
- Clade: Eudicots
- Clade: Asterids
- Order: Lamiales
- Family: Gesneriaceae
- Genus: Aeschynanthus
- Species: A. pulcher

Binomial name
- Aeschynanthus pulcher G.Don

Synonyms
- Aeschynanthus beccarii C.B.Clarke; Aeschynanthus boschianus de Vriese; Aeschynanthus javanicus Hook.; Aeschynanthus lampongus Miq.; Aeschynanthus lanceolatus Ridl.; Aeschynanthus lobbianus Hook.; Aeschynanthus neesii Zoll. & Moritzi; Aeschynanthus parvifolius R.Br.; Aeschynanthus zollingeri C.B.Clarke; Trichosporum beccarii (C.B.Clarke) Kuntze; Trichosporum javanicum (Hook.) Kuntze; Trichosporum lampongum (Miq.) Burkill; Trichosporum lobbianum (Hook.) Kuntze; Trichosporum parvifolium (R.Br.) Kuntze; Trichosporum pulchrum Blume; Trichosporum zollingeri (C.B.Clarke) Kuntze

= Aeschynanthus pulcher =

Species of flowering plant

Aeschynanthus pulcher, the lipstick plant or red bugle vine, is a species of evergreen perennial plant in the family Gesneriaceae, native to Indochina and western Malesia. An epiphytic climber, it produces clusters of red flowers from summer to winter. The common name "lipstick plant" refers to the bright red tubular flowers, about 6 cm long, that emerge from a maroon calyx, which resemble lipstick emerging from a tube. The plant may grow 60 cm to 2 meters tall, with an average spread of 50 cm. The leaves are elliptic and are arranged in pairs, with smooth edges.

The specific epithet pulcher means "pretty" or "beautiful", referring to the brilliant red blooms.

With a minimum temperature of 15–18 °C (59–64 °F), A. pulcher is grown as a houseplant in temperate regions. It is particularly suitable for hanging baskets. It requires bright light but not direct sunlight, does best in humid conditions, and should be potted in a porous, acidic medium. It has gained the Royal Horticultural Society's Award of Garden Merit. It has heavy, succulent-like leaves and the soil should be allowed to dry out between waterings. Common pests include aphids and mealybugs.

== Gallery ==
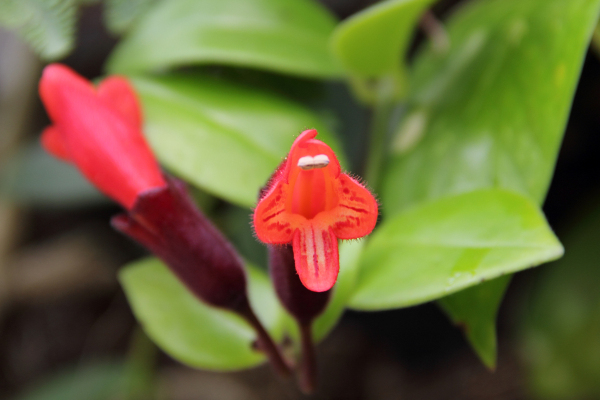

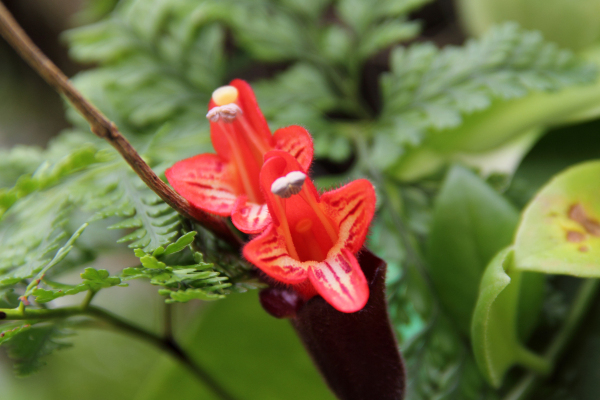

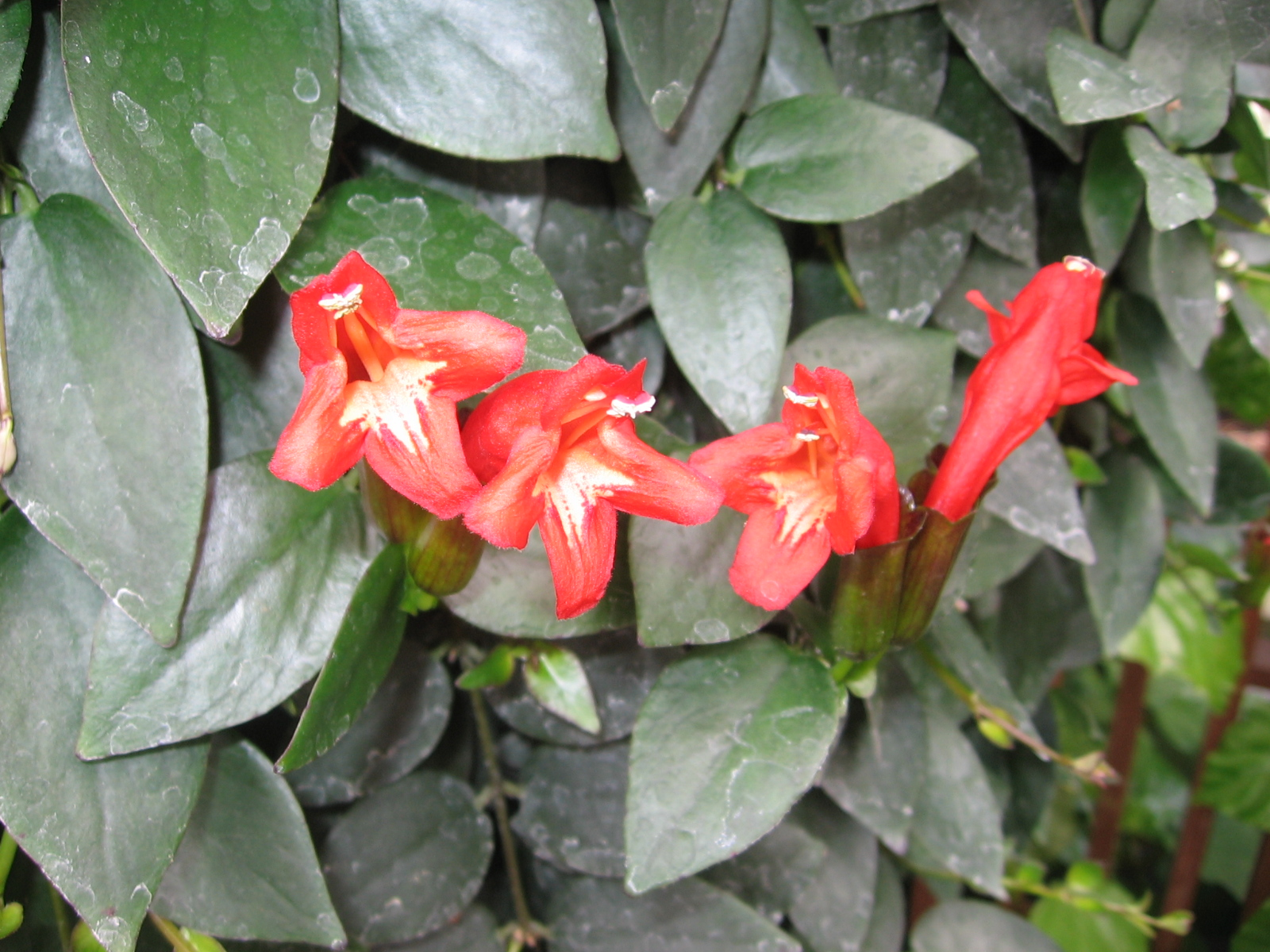
