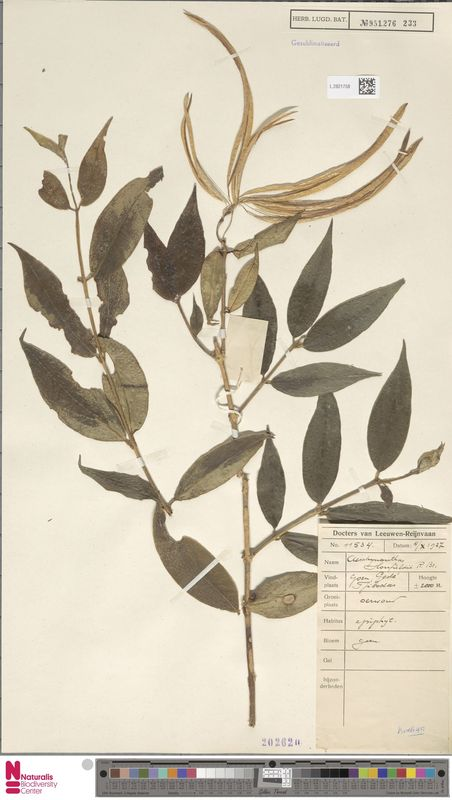

Scientific classification
- Kingdom: Plantae
- Clade: Embryophytes
- Clade: Tracheophytes
- Clade: Spermatophytes
- Clade: Angiosperms
- Clade: Eudicots
- Clade: Asterids
- Order: Lamiales
- Family: Gesneriaceae
- Genus: Aeschynanthus
- Species: A. horsfieldii

Binomial name
- Aeschynanthus horsfieldii R.Br.

Synonyms
- Trichosporum horsfieldii (R.Br.) Kuntze; Lysionotus pulchellus Blume ex C.B.Clarke

= Aeschynanthus horsfieldii =

Species of flowering plant

Aeschynanthus horsfieldii is a species of flowering plant in the family Gesneriaceae. It is an epiphyte native to Indonesia. The species was described in 1839.

== Taxonomy ==
The species was described by Robert Brown in 1839.

== Distribution ==
Aeschynanthus horsfieldii is native to the wet tropical biome of Java and Sumatra.

== Description ==
Aeschynanthus horsfieldii is an epiphytic subshrub.
