= Aeschynanthus albidus =

Scientific classification
- Kingdom: Plantae
- Clade: Tracheophytes
- Clade: Angiosperms
- Clade: Eudicots
- Clade: Asterids
- Order: Lamiales
- Family: Gesneriaceae
- Genus: Aeschynanthus
- Species: A. albidus

Binomial name
- Aeschynanthus albidus (Blume) Steud.

Synonyms
- Bignonia albida Blume; Lysionotus albidus (Blume) Blume; Trichosporum albidum (Blume) Nees; Aeschynanthus atropurpureus Lem.; Aeschynanthus atrosanguineus Van Houtte ex C.B.Clarke; Aeschynanthus discolor T.Moore; Aeschynanthus fraserianus Kraenzl.; Aeschynanthus motleyi C.B.Clarke; Aeschynanthus motleyi var. sumatrensis C.B.Clarke; Aeschynanthus purpurascens Hassk.; Trichosporum fraserianum (Kraenzl.) Merr.; Trichosporum motleyi (C.B.Clarke) Kuntze

Species of flowering plant

Aeschynanthus albidus is a species of flowering plant in the family Gesneriaceae. It is an epiphyte native to Malesia, and was described in 1823.

== Taxonomy ==
Aeschynanthus albidus was first described by Carl Ludwig Blume in 1823, and placed in the genus Bignonia. In 1840, Ernst Gottlieb von Steudel moved it to the genus Aeschynanthus.

== Distribution ==
Aeschynanthus albidus is native to the wet tropical biome of Malesia (Borneo, Java, Malaysia, and Sumatra).

== Description ==
Aeschynanthus albidus is an epiphytic subshrub.
