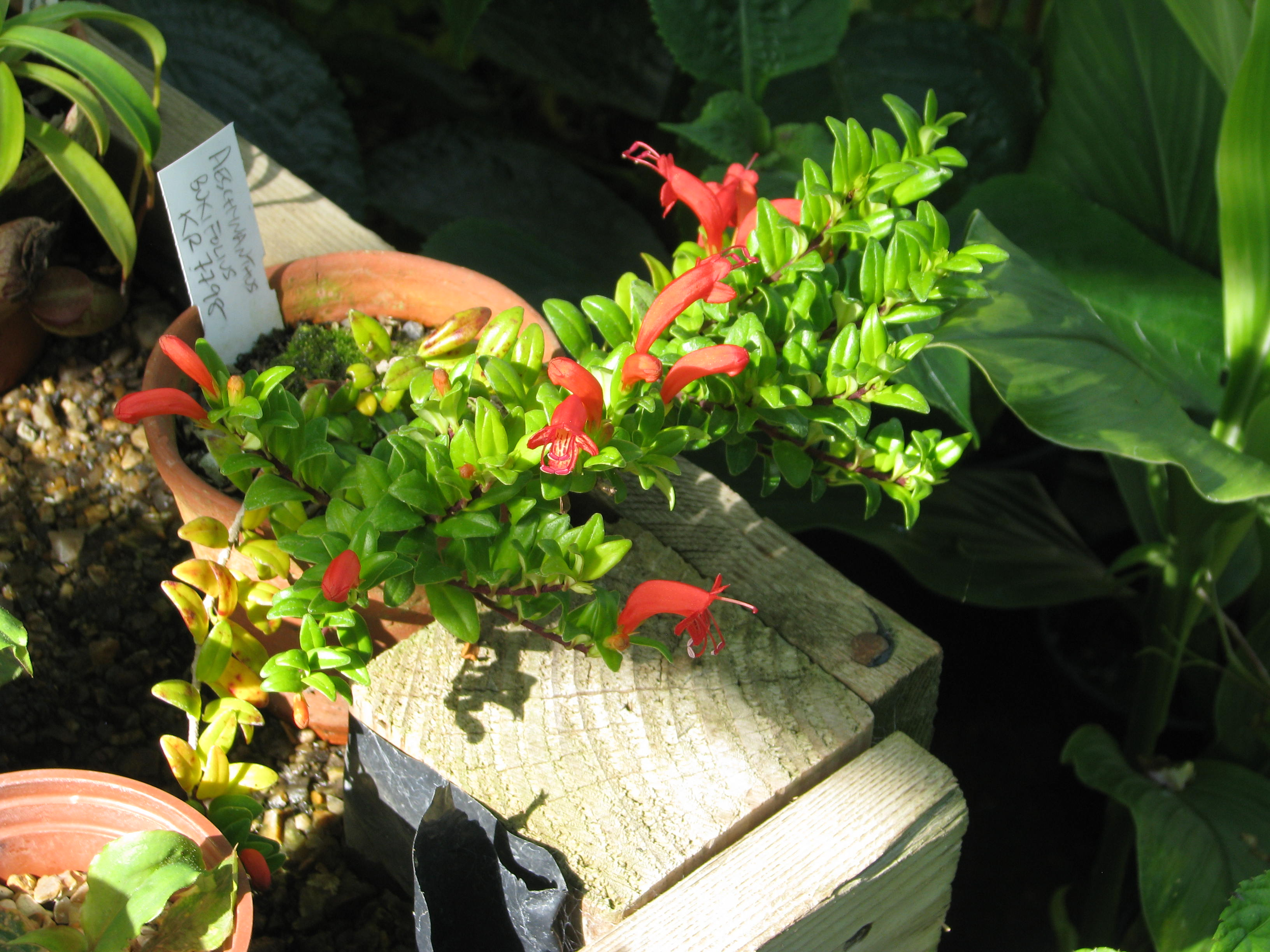
- Greenhouse specimen

Scientific classification
- Kingdom: Plantae
- Clade: Tracheophytes
- Clade: Angiosperms
- Clade: Eudicots
- Clade: Asterids
- Order: Lamiales
- Family: Gesneriaceae
- Genus: Aeschynanthus
- Species: A. buxifolius

Binomial name
- Aeschynanthus buxifolius Hemsl.

= Aeschynanthus buxifolius =

Species of plant

Aeschynanthus buxifolius, the box-leaf lipstick plant, is a species of flowering plant in the family Gesneriaceae, native to southern China and northern Vietnam. An epiphyte and lithophyte, it is found growing in forests at elevations from 1,300 to 2,200 m (4,300 to 7,200 ft). It has gained the Royal Horticultural Society's Award of Garden Merit as a tropical hothouse ornamental.
