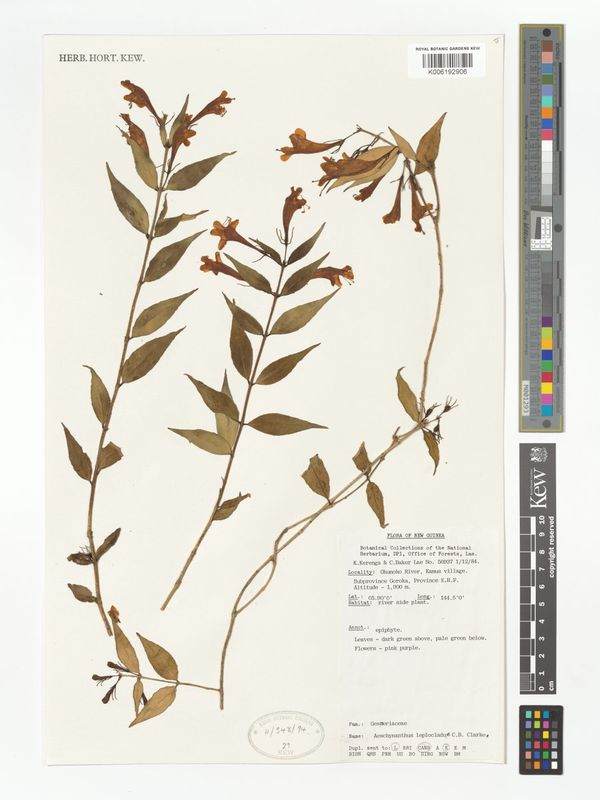

Scientific classification
- Kingdom: Plantae
- Clade: Embryophytes
- Clade: Tracheophytes
- Clade: Angiosperms
- Clade: Eudicots
- Clade: Asterids
- Order: Lamiales
- Family: Gesneriaceae
- Genus: Aeschynanthus
- Species: A. leptocladus

Binomial name
- Aeschynanthus leptocladus C.B.Clarke

Synonyms
- Trichosporum leptocladum (C.B.Clarke) Kuntze

= Aeschynanthus leptocladus =

Species of flowering plant

Aeschynanthus leptocladus is a species of flowering plant in the family Gesneriaceae. It is an epiphyte native to New Guinea, and was described in 1883.

== Taxonomy ==
Aeschynanthus leptocladus was described by Charles Baron Clarke in 1883. Otto Kuntze placed it in the genus Trichosporum, which is a synonym of Aeschynanthus.

== Distribution ==
Aeschynanthus leptocladus is native to the wet tropical biome of New Guinea.

== Description ==
Aeschynanthus leptocladus is an epiphytic subshrub.
