= Aeschynanthus impar =

Scientific classification
- Kingdom: Plantae
- Clade: Embryophytes
- Clade: Tracheophytes
- Clade: Spermatophytes
- Clade: Angiosperms
- Clade: Eudicots
- Clade: Asterids
- Order: Lamiales
- Family: Gesneriaceae
- Genus: Aeschynanthus
- Species: A. impar

Binomial name
- Aeschynanthus impar Schltr.

Species of flowering plant

Aeschynanthus impar is a species of flowering plant in the family Gesneriaceae. It is an epiphyte native to the wet tropical biome of New Guinea. The species was described by Rudolf Schlechter in 1923.
