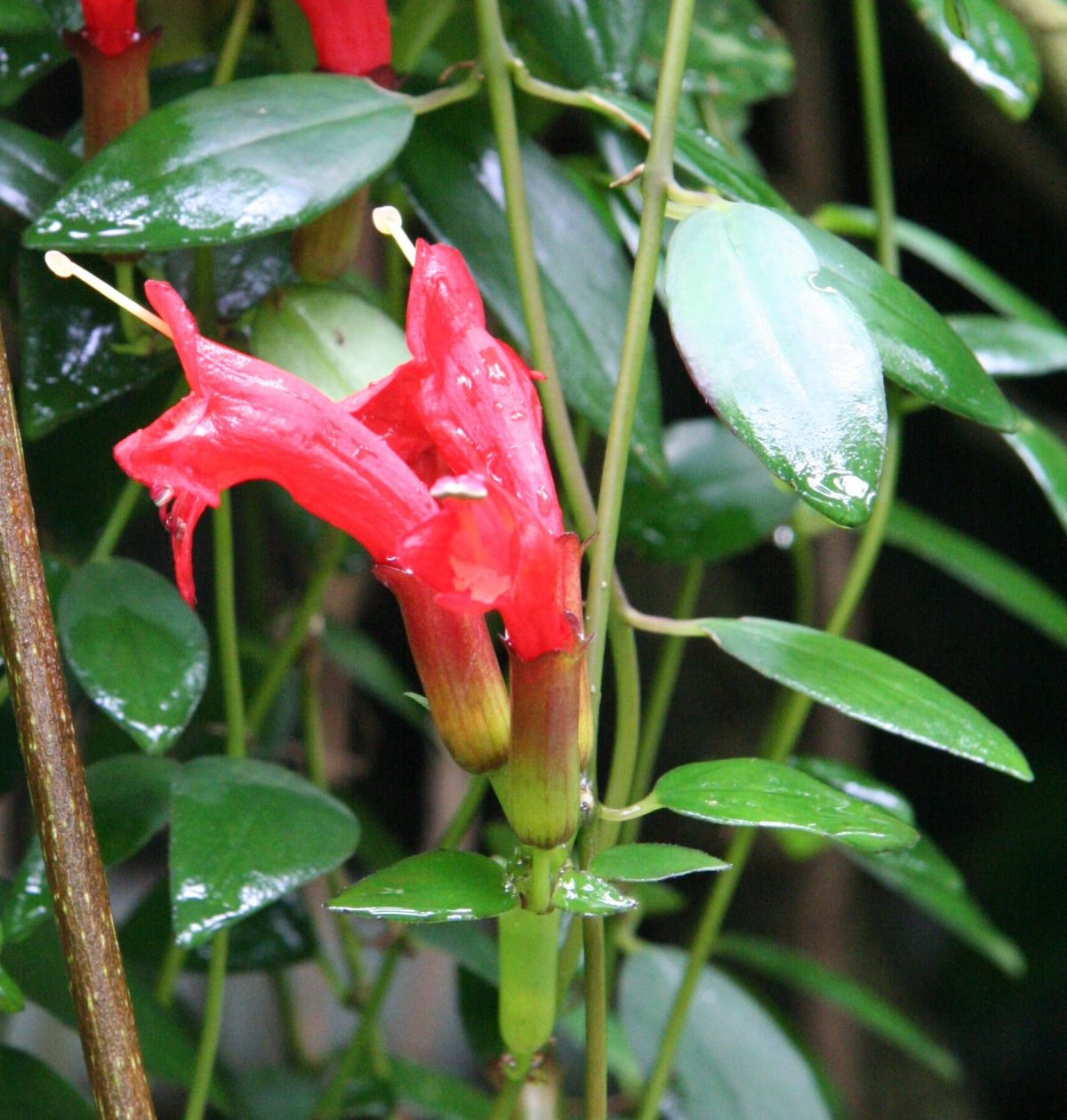

Scientific classification
- Kingdom: Plantae
- Clade: Tracheophytes
- Clade: Angiosperms
- Clade: Eudicots
- Clade: Asterids
- Order: Lamiales
- Family: Gesneriaceae
- Genus: Aeschynanthus
- Species: A. radicans

Binomial name
- Aeschynanthus radicans Jack

Synonyms
- Trichosporum radicans (Jack) Nees; Aeschynanthus radicans var. lanuginosus Ridl.; Aeschynanthus radicans var. robustior C.B.Clarke; Trichosporum ovatum D.Don ex C.B.Clarke

= Aeschynanthus radicans =

Species of flowering plant

Aeschynanthus radicans is a vine-like plant in the family Gesneriaceae. It is native to the humid tropics of the Malay Peninsula south to Java.

== Description ==
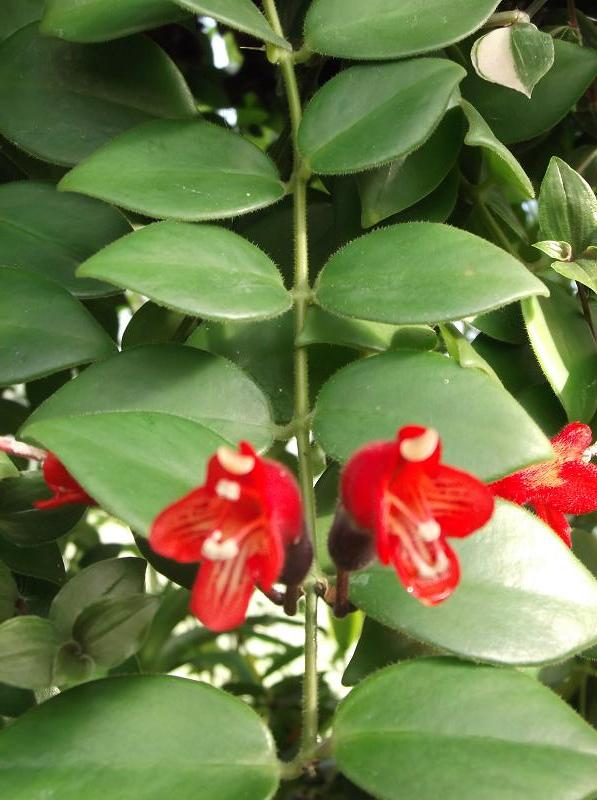
Flowers and leaves

It is an epiphyte or lithophyte growing to 1.5 m tall, with leathery, green leaves that are 4–8 cm long, ovate to lanceolate, opposite or whorled. The flowers are terminal, tubular, 5–7.5 cm long, with the upper lobes shorter than the lower. They are usually scarlet with yellow throats.

The common name lipstick plant, shared with other plants of the genus Aeschynanthus, comes from the scarlet flowers that open from buds resembling tubes of lipstick.

== Cultivation ==
This plant is noted for its excellence as an interior plant and is perfect for hanging baskets. It requires a great deal of light, but not direct sunlight. Humidity is also noted as having an important positive effect. Clipping the plant makes it fuller. New plants may be started in water from clippings. This particular plant is also distinctive due to its pungent smell.
