= Aeschynanthus amoenus =

Scientific classification
- Kingdom: Plantae
- Clade: Tracheophytes
- Clade: Angiosperms
- Clade: Eudicots
- Clade: Asterids
- Order: Lamiales
- Family: Gesneriaceae
- Genus: Aeschynanthus
- Species: A. amoenus

Binomial name
- Aeschynanthus amoenus C.B.Clarke

Synonyms
- Trichosporum amoenum (C.B.Clarke) Kuntze

Species of flowering plant

Aeschynanthus amoenus is a species of flowering plant in the family Gesneriaceae. It is an epiphyte native to Java, and was described in 1883.

== Taxonomy ==
Aeschynanthus amoenus was described by Charles Baron Clarke in 1883.

== Distribution ==
Aeschynanthus amoenus is native to the wet tropical biome of Java.

== Description ==
Aeschynanthus amoenus is an epiphytic subshrub.
