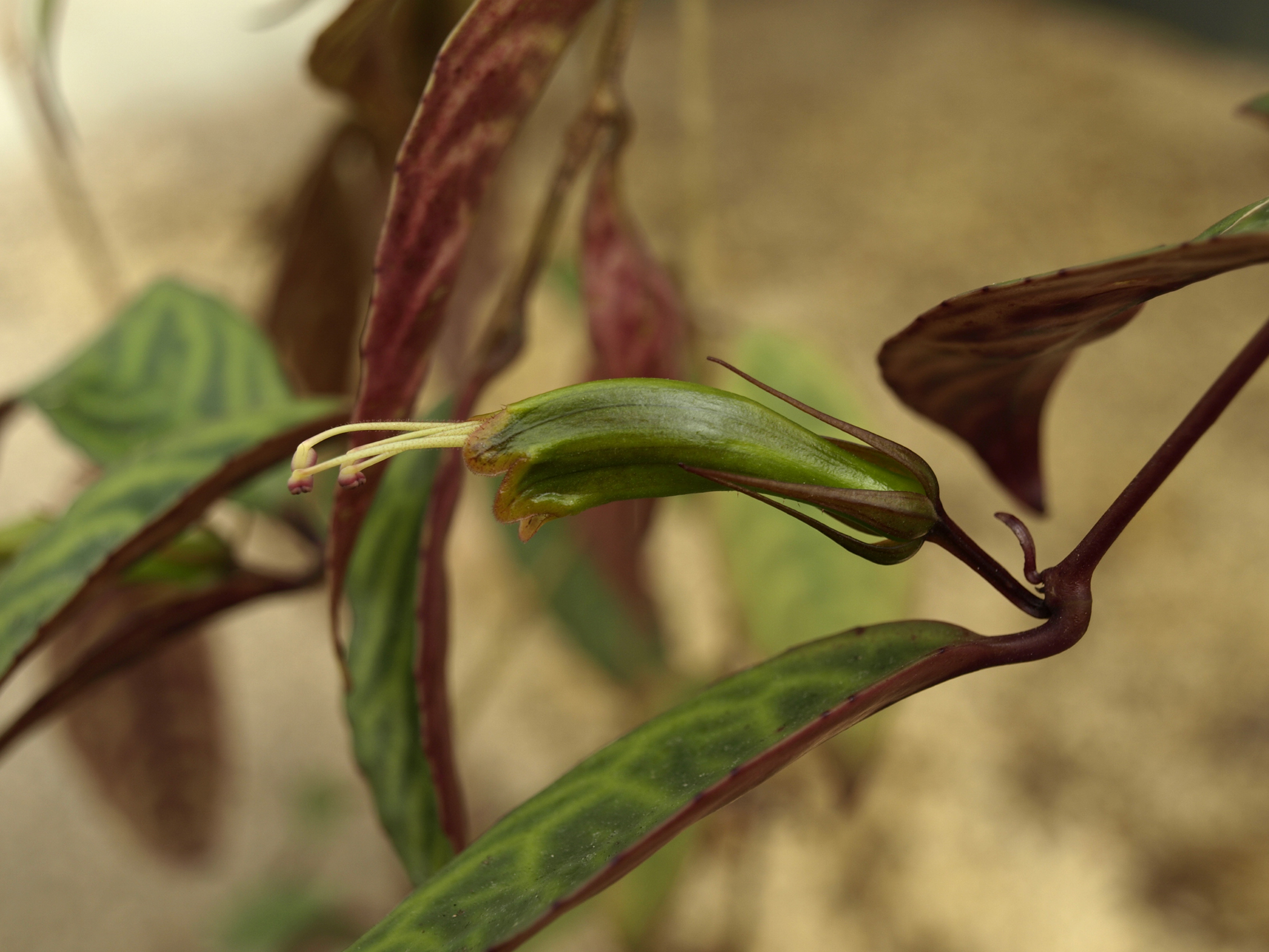

Scientific classification
- Kingdom: Plantae
- Clade: Tracheophytes
- Clade: Angiosperms
- Clade: Eudicots
- Clade: Asterids
- Order: Lamiales
- Family: Gesneriaceae
- Genus: Aeschynanthus
- Species: A. longicaulis

Binomial name
- Aeschynanthus longicaulis Wall.

Synonyms
- Aeschynanthus marmoratus T.Moore; Aeschynanthus zebrinus Lem.; Aeschynanthus zebrinus Van Houtte ex Walp.

= Aeschynanthus longicaulis =

Species of flowering plant

Aeschynanthus longicaulis (syn. Aeschynanthus marmoratus) is a species of perennial plant in the family Gesneriaceae, native to Vietnam, Thailand and Malaysia. Naturally, it grows as an epiphyte on trees. The leaves are pointed, 6-12 cm long and 2-3 cm wide, and are dark green marbled with a creamy white on the top and pale green marbled with maroon on the underside. It produces clusters of tubular orange flowers up to 5 cm long on trailing purple stems, from summer to winter. The flowers give way to 30cm-long capsules containing multiple seeds.

The specific epithet longicaulis means "long-stemmed".

A. longicaulis is grown as a houseplant in temperate regions. It has gained the Royal Horticultural Society's Award of Garden Merit. This species is used to growing under the canopy of large trees in the forest, and leaves may suffer light damage and become yellow if placed in bright light.
