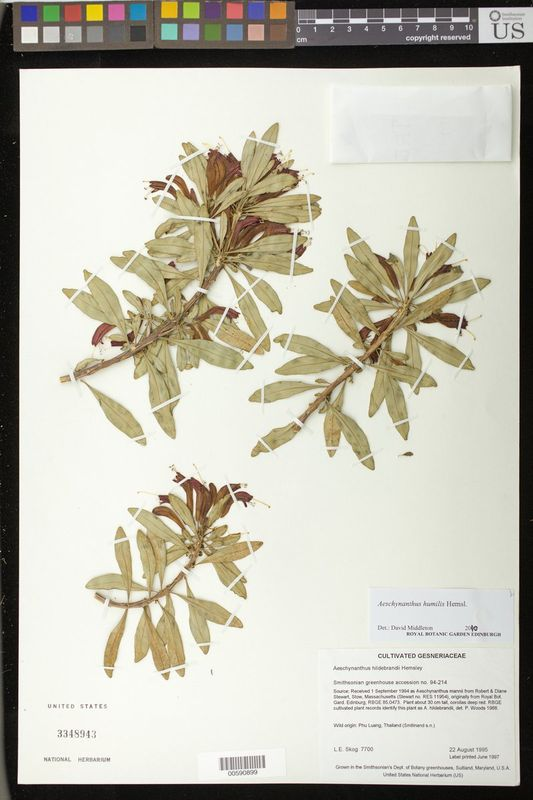

Scientific classification
- Kingdom: Plantae
- Clade: Embryophytes
- Clade: Tracheophytes
- Clade: Spermatophytes
- Clade: Angiosperms
- Clade: Eudicots
- Clade: Asterids
- Order: Lamiales
- Family: Gesneriaceae
- Genus: Aeschynanthus
- Species: A. humilis

Binomial name
- Aeschynanthus humilis Hemsl.

= Aeschynanthus humilis =

Species of flowering plant

Aeschynanthus humilis is a species of flowering plant in the family Gesneriaceae. It is an epiphyte with leathery leaves, red flowers, and capsule fruits. The species is native to east Asia, and was described in 1903.

== Taxonomy ==
The species was described by William Hemsley in 1903.

== Distribution ==
Aeschynanthus humilis is native to the wet tropical biome of south-central China (Yunnan), Laos, Thailand, and Vietnam. The species grows on trees in forested valleys, at elevations of 1,300–2,100 metres (4,300–6,900 ft).

== Description ==
Aeschynanthus humilis is an epiphytic subshrub. The stems are 5–24 centimetres (2.0–9.4 in) long.

The leaves are arranged oppositely, or are in groups of three. The leaves are leathery, oblanceolate to spoon-shaped, 0.7–2.2 centimetres (0.28–0.87 in) long, and 0.4–0.8 centimetres (0.16–0.31 in) wide. The leaf margins are smooth. The leaf stems are up to 2 millimetres (0.079 in) long.

The inflorescences lack stems, and have one to three flowers. The flower stems are 4–10 millimetres (0.16–0.39 in) long. The calyx is 4–4.6 millimetres (0.16–0.18 in) long, has five lobes, and is often red to purple. The calyx tube is 3–4 millimetres (0.12–0.16 in) wide at the mouth. The lobes are narrowly triangular, 2–2.5 millimetres (0.079–0.098 in) long, and 0.8–1 millimetre (0.031–0.039 in) wide. The corolla is red, and 1.6–2.7 centimetres (0.63–1.06 in) long. The plant flowers from September to January.

The seed is a 4.5–6 centimetres (1.8–2.4 in) long capsule. The seeds have a hairlike appendage at each end, which is 6–10 millimetres (0.24–0.39 in) long.

== Nomenclature ==
In Chinese, Aeschynanthus humilis is known as 矮芒毛苣苔 (ai mang mao ju tai).
