= Aeschynanthus lepidospermus =

Scientific classification
- Kingdom: Plantae
- Clade: Embryophytes
- Clade: Tracheophytes
- Clade: Angiosperms
- Clade: Eudicots
- Clade: Asterids
- Order: Lamiales
- Family: Gesneriaceae
- Genus: Aeschynanthus
- Species: A. lepidospermus

Binomial name
- Aeschynanthus lepidospermus C.B.Clarke

Synonyms
- Trichosporum lepidospermum (C.B.Clarke) Kuntze

Species of flowering plant

Aeschynanthus lepidospermus is a species of flowering plant in the family Gesneriaceae. It is an epiphyte native to Borneo, and was described in 1883.

== Taxonomy ==
The species was described by Charles Baron Clarke in 1883. Otto Kuntze placed the species in Trichosporum, which is a synonym of Aeschynanthus.

== Distribution ==
Aeschynanthus lepidospermus is native to the wet tropical biome of Borneo.

== Description ==
Aeschynanthus lepidospermus is an epiphytic subshrub.
