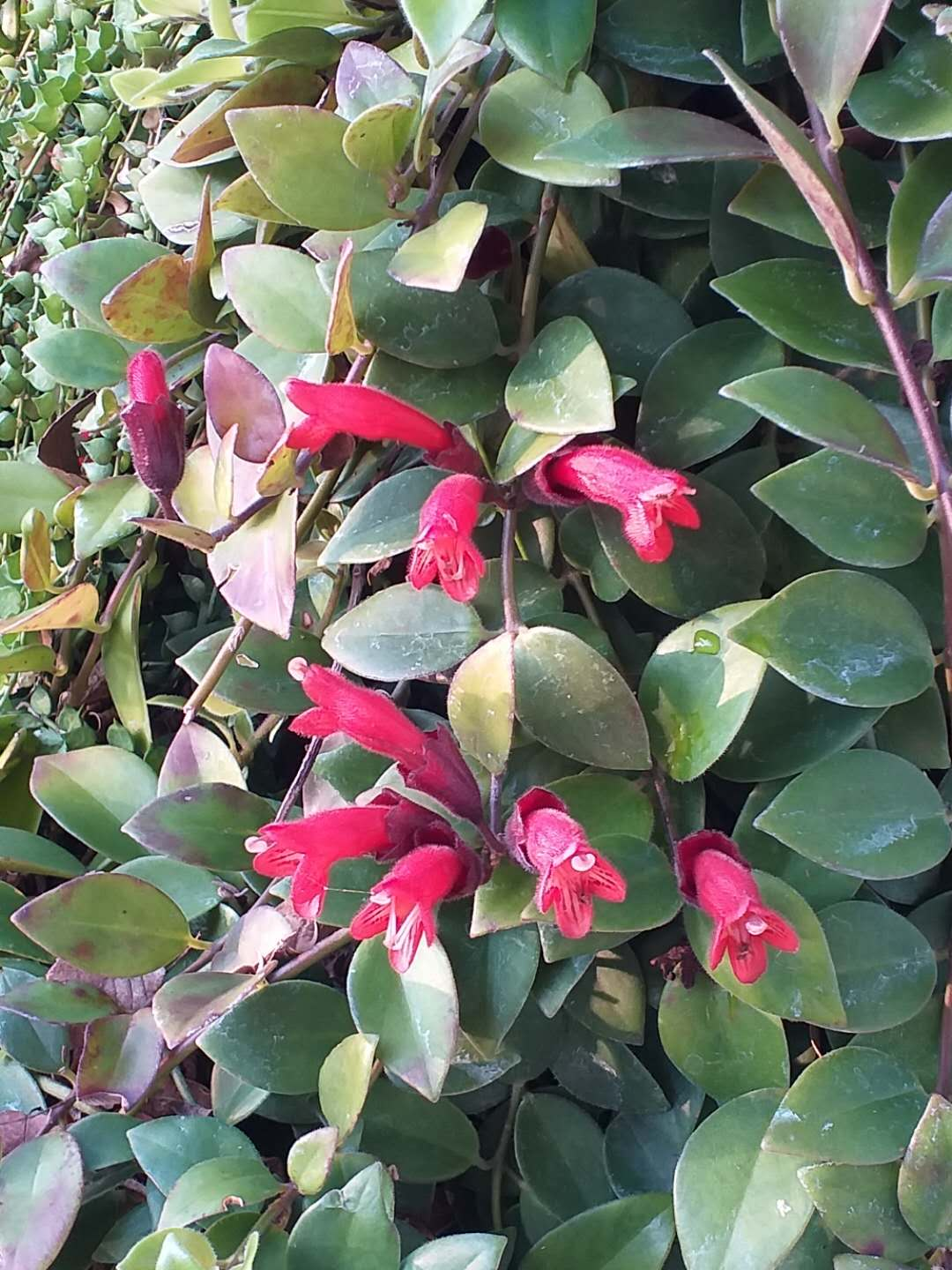
- A. acuminatus cultivated

Scientific classification
- Kingdom: Plantae
- Clade: Tracheophytes
- Clade: Angiosperms
- Clade: Eudicots
- Clade: Asterids
- Order: Lamiales
- Family: Gesneriaceae
- Genus: Aeschynanthus
- Species: A. acuminatus

Binomial name
- Aeschynanthus acuminatus Wall. ex A. DC.

Synonyms
- Trichosporum acuminatum (Wall. ex A. DC.) Matsum. Trichosporum acuminatum (Wall. ex A. DC.) Kuntze; Aeschynanthus chinensis Gardner & Champion; Aeschynanthus acuminatus var. chinensis (Gardner & Champion) C.B. Clarke

= Aeschynanthus acuminatus =

Species of flowering plant

Aeschynanthus acuminatus is an Asian species of vine plants in the family Gesneriaceae, with no subspecies listed in the Catalogue of Life. A common name for this and similar species in the genus "lipstick vine".

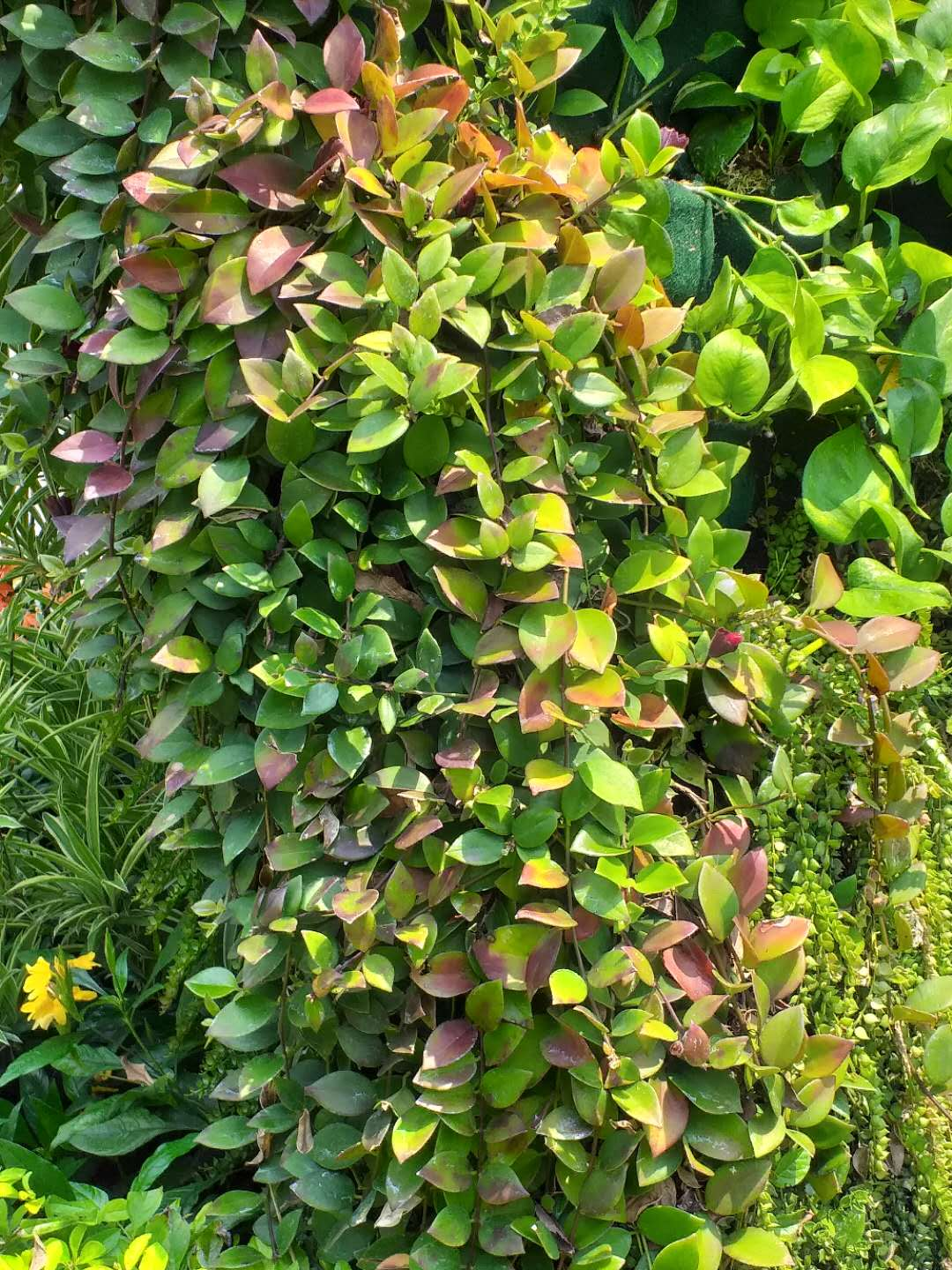
Plant displayed in the 2018 Taichung World Flora Exposition, Taiwan.
