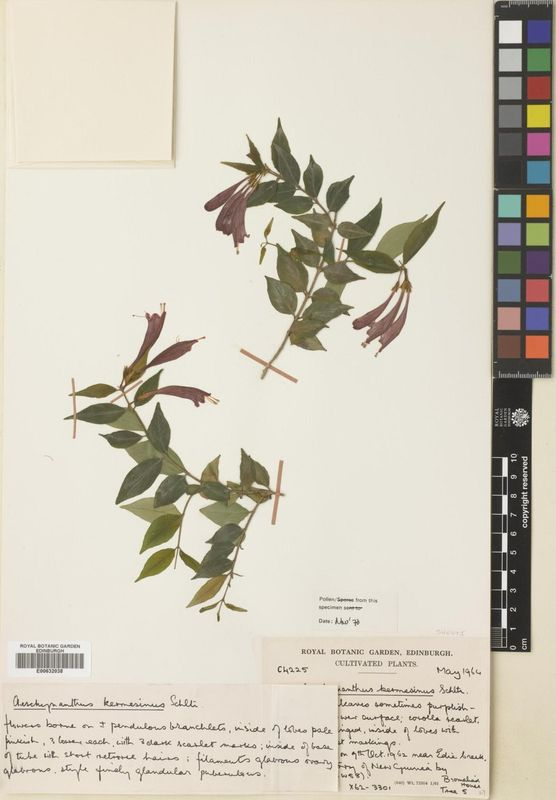

Scientific classification
- Kingdom: Plantae
- Clade: Embryophytes
- Clade: Tracheophytes
- Clade: Spermatophytes
- Clade: Angiosperms
- Clade: Eudicots
- Clade: Asterids
- Order: Lamiales
- Family: Gesneriaceae
- Genus: Aeschynanthus
- Species: A. kermesinus

Binomial name
- Aeschynanthus kermesinus Schltr.

= Aeschynanthus kermesinus =

Species of flowering plant

Aeschynanthus kermesinus is a species of flowering plant in the family Gesneriaceae. It is an epiphyte native to New Guinea, that was described in 1923.

== Taxonomy ==
The species was described by Rudolf Schlechter in 1923.

== Distribution ==
Aeschynanthus kermesinus is native to the wet tropical biome of New Guinea.

== Description ==
Aeschynanthus kermesinus is an epiphytic subshrub.
