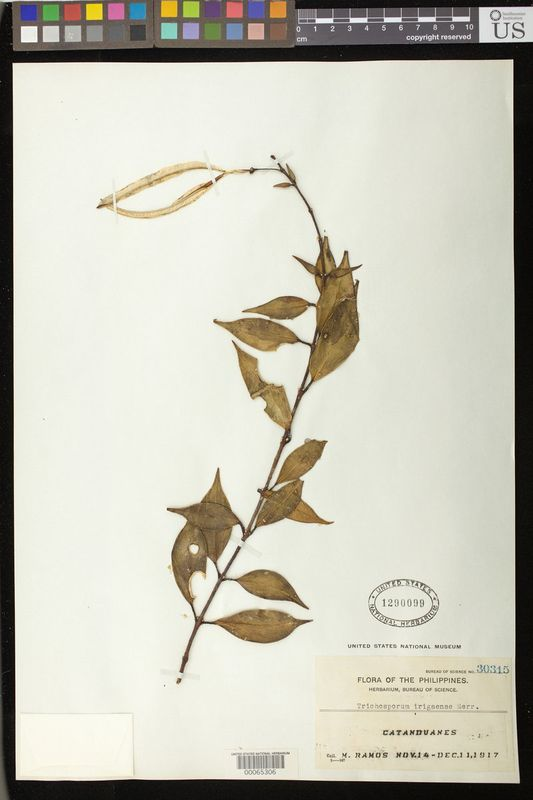

Scientific classification
- Kingdom: Plantae
- Clade: Embryophytes
- Clade: Tracheophytes
- Clade: Angiosperms
- Clade: Eudicots
- Clade: Asterids
- Order: Lamiales
- Family: Gesneriaceae
- Genus: Aeschynanthus
- Species: A. irigaensis

Binomial name
- Aeschynanthus irigaensis (Merr.) B.L.Burtt & P.Woods

Synonyms
- Trichosporum irigaense Merr.

= Aeschynanthus irigaensis =

Species of flowering plant

Aeschynanthus irigaensis is a species of flowering plant in the family Gesneriaceae. It is an epiphyte native to the Philippines, and was described in 1915.

== Taxonomy ==
The species was initially described by Elmer Drew Merrill in 1915, and placed in the genus Trichosporum. In 1975, B.L.Burtt and Patrick James Blythe Woods moved it to the genus Aeschynanthus.

== Distribution ==
Aeschynanthus irigaensis is native to the Philippine island of Luzon. It grows in wet tropical environments.

== Description ==
Aeschynanthus irigaensis is an epiphytic subshrub.
