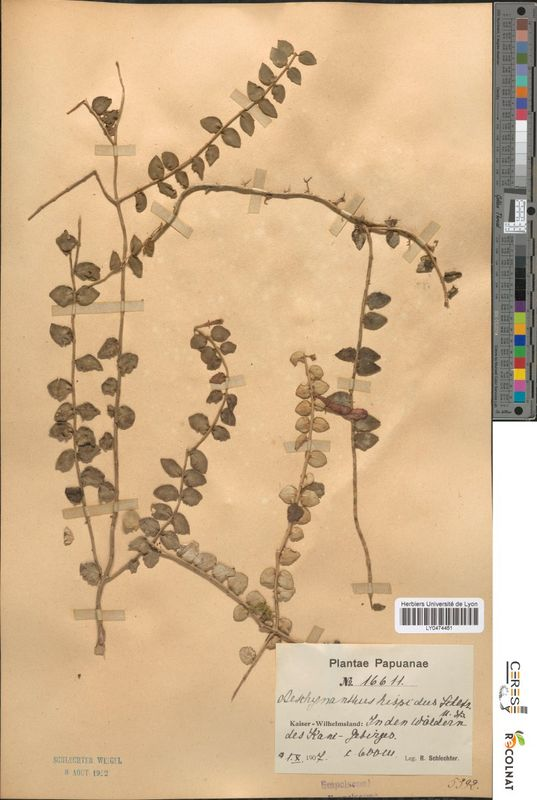

Scientific classification
- Kingdom: Plantae
- Clade: Embryophytes
- Clade: Tracheophytes
- Clade: Spermatophytes
- Clade: Angiosperms
- Clade: Eudicots
- Clade: Asterids
- Order: Lamiales
- Family: Gesneriaceae
- Genus: Aeschynanthus
- Species: A. hispidus

Binomial name
- Aeschynanthus hispidus Schltr.

= Aeschynanthus hispidus =

Species of flowering plant

Aeschynanthus hispidus is a species of flowering plant in the family Gesneriaceae. It is an epiphyte native to New Guinea, first described in 1923.

== Taxonomy ==
Rudolf Schlechter described Aeschynanthus hispidus in 1923.

== Distribution ==
The species is native to the wet tropical biome of New Guinea.

== Description ==
Aeschynanthus hispidus is an epiphytic subshrub.
