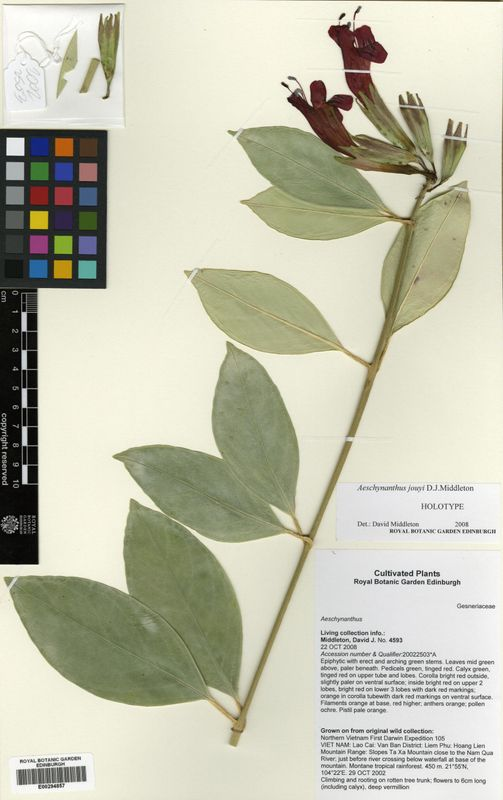

Scientific classification
- Kingdom: Plantae
- Clade: Embryophytes
- Clade: Tracheophytes
- Clade: Angiosperms
- Clade: Eudicots
- Clade: Asterids
- Order: Lamiales
- Family: Gesneriaceae
- Genus: Aeschynanthus
- Species: A. jouyi

Binomial name
- Aeschynanthus jouyi D.J.Middleton

= Aeschynanthus jouyi =

Species of flowering plant

Aeschynanthus jouyi is a species of flowering plant in the family Gesneriaceae. It is an epiphyte with leathery leaves, and red, tube-shaped flowers. The species is native to Vietnam and Cambodia.

A. jouyi was described in 2009, and is named for Alain Jouy.

== Taxonomy ==
The species was described in 2009, by David John Middleton.

== Distribution ==
Aeschynanthus jouyi is native to the wet tropical biome of Cambodia and Vietnam. It grows in forests, at elevations of 450–1,500 metres (1,480–4,920 ft).

== Description ==
Aeschynanthus jouyi is an epiphytic subshrub. It has hanging green stems. The leaves are arranged oppositely. The leaves are leathery, elliptical, paler on the underside than the upperside, 5–11.5 centimetres (2.0–4.5 in) long, and 2.5–5.5 centimetres (0.98–2.17 in) wide. The leaf stem is 1.7–2.5 millimetres (0.067–0.098 in) long.

The inflorescence has two to seven flowers, and grows on a 2–13 millimetres (0.079–0.512 in) stems. The flower stems are 12–21 millimetres (0.47–0.83 in) long. The calyx is a 28–35 millimetres (1.1–1.4 in) long tube, which is around 7.5 millimetres (0.30 in) wide at the top. The tube has lobes, which are 8–11 millimetres (0.31–0.43 in) long, and 2.8–4 millimetres (0.11–0.16 in) wide. The calyx is green, and sometimes has red-tinged lobes.

The corolla is 76–83 millimetres (3.0–3.3 in) long, bright red on the outside, and light yellow on the inside. The corolla has lobes, which are around 16.5 millimetres (0.65 in) long, and 10 millimetres (0.39 in) wide. The pollen is ochre.

Aeschynanthus jouyi is similar to Aeschynanthus rhododendron, but A. jouyi has shorter stamens.

== Etymology ==
Aeschynanthus jouyi is named for Alain Jouy, a French botanical artist.
