= Mary Mendum (botanist) =

English woman botanist (1945-2004)

Mary Mendum (1945-2004), born Caroline Mary Bates, was a British botanist, taxonomist and botanical illustrator. A number of plant species were described and named by her, as well as others named in memory of her. The Mary Mendum Medal is awarded in her honour for an exceptional outstanding botanical illustration.

== Career ==
Mendum was a botanist, taxonomist and botanical illustrator; she worked at the Royal Botanic Garden Edinburgh. She undertook botanical fieldwork in the Philippines and Indonesia collecting specimens, publishing on them and naming them. In 1993 Mendum, under her name of Caroline Mary Bates, was awarded the Jill Smythies Award for botanical illustration.

== Species named by or in honour of Mary Mendum ==
- Aeschynanthus arctocalyx Mendum & Madulid. Described and name published by Mendum and Madulid in 1995.
- Aeschynanthus argentii Mendum. Described and name published by Mendum in 1999.
- Aeschynanthus batakiorum Mendum & Madulid. Described and name published by Mendum in 1999.
- Aeschynanthus batesii Mendum. Described and name published by Mendum in 2003.
- Aeschynanthus burttii Mendum. Described and name published by Mendum in 2003.
- Aeschynanthus citrinus Mendum & S.M. Scott. Described and name published by Mendum, Scott and Galloway in 2006.
- Aeschynanthus curvicalyx Mendum. Described and name published by Mendum in 2001.
- Aeschynanthus elmeri Mendum. Transferred to genus Aeschynanthus, renamed and published by Mendum in 2001.
- Aescyhnanthus lobaticalyx Mendum. Described and name published by Mendum in 2003.
- Aeschynanthus flavidus Mendum & P. Woods. Described and name published by Mendum and Woods in 1997.
- Aeschynanthus intraflavus Mendum. Described and name published by Mendum in 1998.
- Aeschynanthus madulidii Mendum. Described and name published by Mendum in 2001.
- Aeschynanthus mendumiae D.J.Middleton
- Aeschynanthus oxychlamys Mendum
- Aeschynanthus pseudohybridus Mendum. Described and name published by Mendum in 1999.
- Aeschynanthus roseoflorus Mendum. Described and name published by Mendum in 1998.
- Aeschynanthus sojolianus Mendum & L.E.R.Galloway. Described and name published by Mendum, Scott and Galloway in 2006.
- Begonia mendumae M.Hughes
- Callicarpa mendumiae Bramley. Named in memory of Mary Mendum.
- Henckelia corrugata Mendum. Described and name published by Mendum in 2001.
- Nepenthes maryae. In commemoration of Mary Mendum.
- Rhododendron mendumiae Argent. Named in memory of Mary Mendum.

== Publications ==
Edinburgh Journal of Botany articles:

- M. Mendum and D. Madulid, November 1995, 'Aeschynanthus arctocalyx, a new species from the Philippines', 52:3, pp. 343–345
- M. Mendum, November 1995, 'Aeschynanthus oxychlamys Mendum, nom. nov. (Gesneriaceae)', 52:3, pp. 362–363
- M. Mendum and P.J.B. Woods, July 1997, 'Aeschynanthus flavidus (Gesneriaceae), a new species from Sarawak', 54:2, pp. 254–257
- M. Mendum, November 1998, 'Notes on Aeschynanthus(Gesneriaceae) from Seram, 55:3, pp. 359–365
- M. Mendum, July 1999, 'Three new species of Aeschynanthus(Gesneriaceae)', 56:2, pp. 265–272
- M.H. Rashid, K. Jong, and M. Mendum, March 2001, 'Cytotaxonomic observations in the genus Aeschynanthus(Gesneriaceae)', 58:1, pp.31-43
- M. Mendum, November 2001, 'Three new Gesneriaceae from Palawan, Philippines', 58:3, pp.435-441
- M. Mendum and H.J. Atkins, November 2003, 'The Gesneriaceae of Sulawesi I: an introduction', 60:3, pp.299-304
- M. Mendum, November 2003 (published online April 2004), 'The Gesneriaceae of Sulawesi III: three new species of Aeschynanthus', 60:3, pp.323-330
- M. Mendum, S.M. Scott, and L.E.R.Galloway, March 2006, 'The Gesneriaceae of Sulawesi IV: two new species of Aeschynanthus', 63:1, pp.67-72
