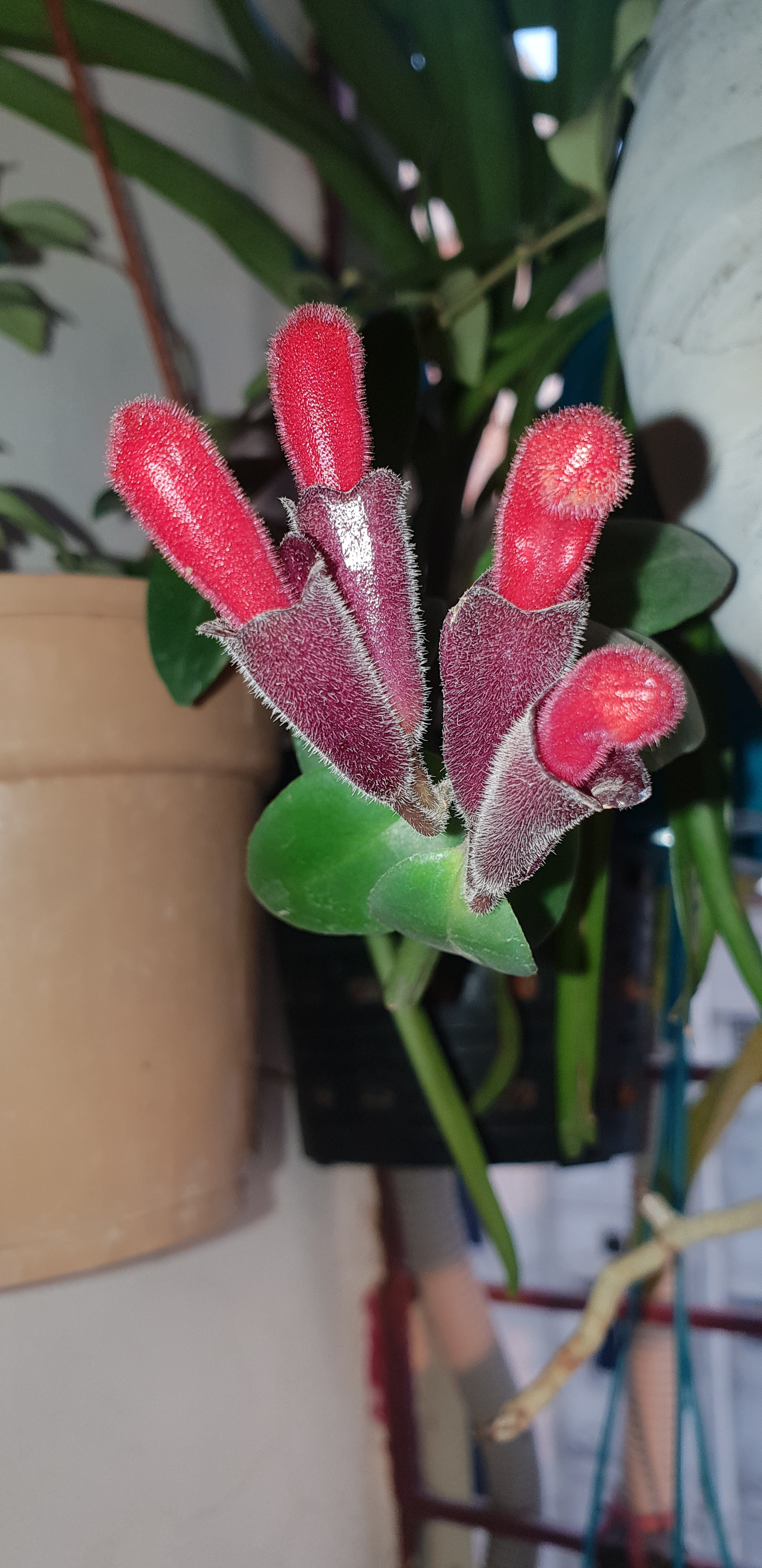
- Aeschynanthus pulcher with unopened buds emerging from calyces

Scientific classification
- Kingdom: Plantae
- Clade: Embryophytes
- Clade: Tracheophytes
- Clade: Spermatophytes
- Clade: Angiosperms
- Clade: Eudicots
- Clade: Asterids
- Order: Lamiales
- Family: Gesneriaceae
- Subfamily: Didymocarpoideae
- Genus: Aeschynanthus; Jack (1823)

Species
- 185; see text

Synonyms
- Euthamnus Schltr. (1923); Micraeschynanthus Ridl. (1925); Oxychlamys Schltr. (1923); Rheitrophyllum Hassk. (1842); Trichosporum D.Don (1822)

= Aeschynanthus =

Genus of flowering plants

Aeschynanthus is a genus of about 150 species of evergreen subtropical and tropical plants in the family Gesneriaceae. They are usually trailing epiphytes with brightly colored flowers that are pollinated by sunbirds. The genus name comes from a contraction of aischuno (to be ashamed) and anthos (flower). The common name for some species is lipstick plant, which comes from the appearance of the developing buds emerging from the calyces.

The genus contains a large variety of plants with differing features. Some have thick, waxy cuticles while others have much softer leaves. Species such as A. speciosus are large where A. micranthus is much smaller and trailing. Several species are valued in temperate climates as houseplants, notably A. longicaulis, A. pulcher and A. radicans.

== Cultivation ==
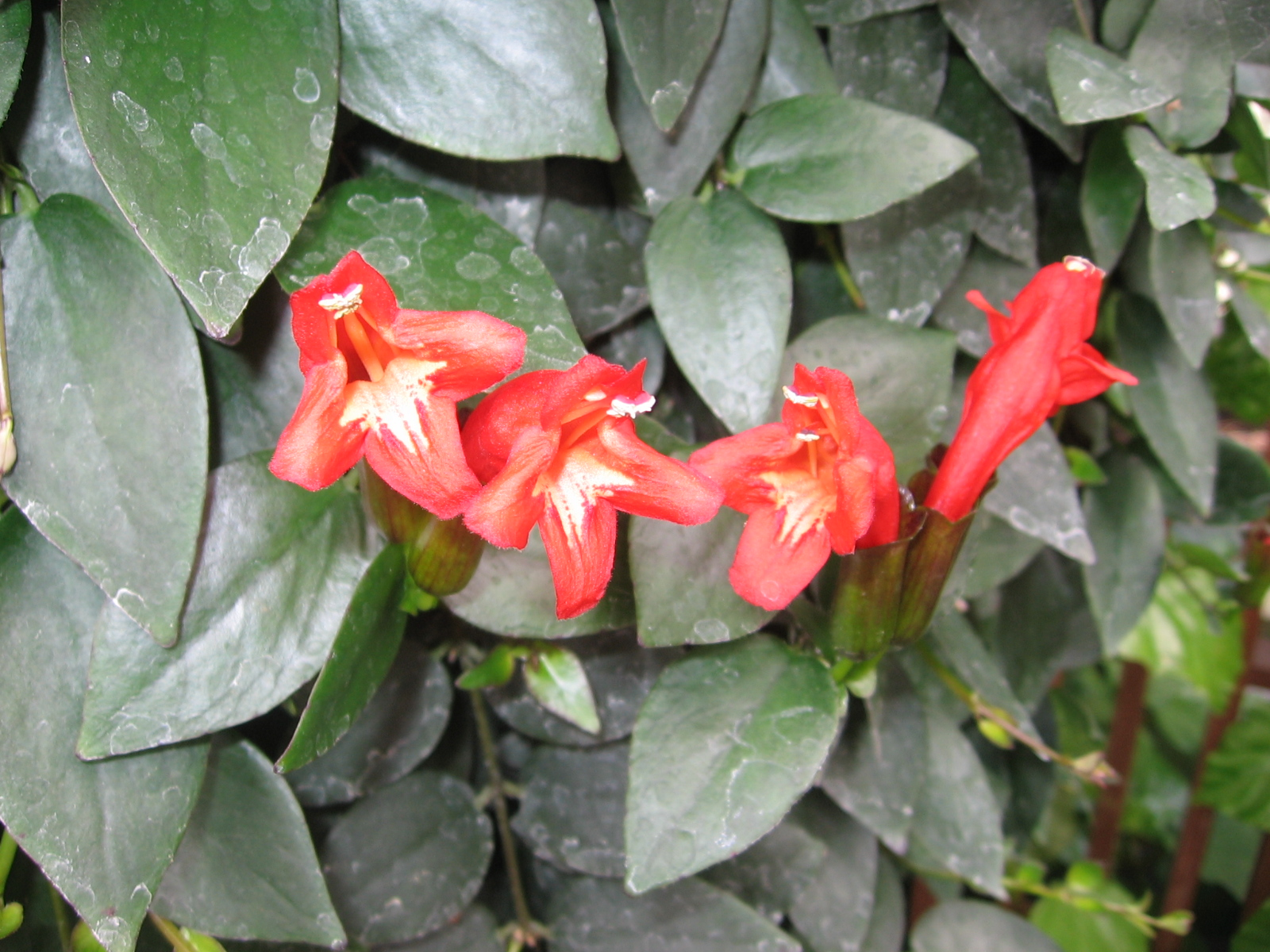
Aeschynanthus pulcher

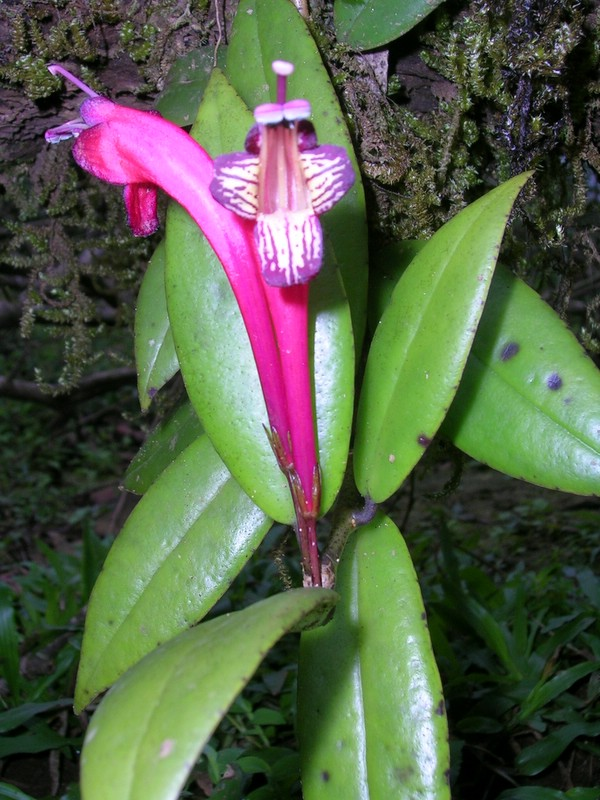
Aeschynanthus perrottetii

They require good lighting and semi-moist, well-drained soil conditions to grow, though they vary and some require more moist soil. They also prefer warm and humid conditions.

== Species ==
A full list of the accepted species and their synonyms can be found in the Gesneriaceae Resource Centre's World Checklist of Gesneriaceae. As of July 2026, 195 species are accepted:

- Aeschynanthus acuminatissimus W.T.Wang
- Aeschynanthus acuminatus Wall. ex A.DC.
- Aeschynanthus albidus (Blume) Steud.
- Aeschynanthus amboinensis (Merr.) Mendum
- Aeschynanthus amoenus C.B.Clarke
- Aeschynanthus andersonii C.B.Clarke
- Aeschynanthus angustifolius (Blume) Steud.
- Aeschynanthus angustioblongus W.T.Wang
- Aeschynanthus angustissimus (W.T.Wang) W.T.Wang
- Aeschynanthus arctocalyx Mendum & Madulid
- Aeschynanthus arfakensis C.B.Clarke
- Aeschynanthus argentii Mendum
- Aeschynanthus asclepioides (Elmer) B.L.Burtt & P.Woods
- Aeschynanthus atrorubens Schltr.
- Aeschynanthus batakiorum Mendum & Madulid
- Aeschynanthus batesii Mendum
- Aeschynanthus brachyphyllus S.Moore
- Aeschynanthus brachysepalus (Merr.) Mansibang & Pelser
- Aeschynanthus bracteatus Wall. ex A.DC.
- Aeschynanthus breviflorus (S.Moore) K.Schum.
- Aeschynanthus burttii Mendum
- Aeschynanthus buxifolius Hemsl.
- Aeschynanthus calanthus Schltr.
- Aeschynanthus cambodiensis D.J.Middleton
- Aeschynanthus camiguinensis Kraenzl.
- Aeschynanthus cardinalis (Copel. ex Merr.) Schltr.
- Aeschynanthus caudatus C.B.Clarke
- Aeschynanthus celebicus Koord.
- Aeschynanthus ceylanicus Gardner
- Aeschynanthus chayangtajoensis Chowlu, A.Shenoy & A.Ray
- Aeschynanthus chiritoides C.B.Clarke
- Aeschynanthus chrysanthus P.Woods
- Aeschynanthus citrinus Mendum & S.M.Scott
- Aeschynanthus clarkei Moaakum, S.Dey, Barbhuiya & G.Krishna
- Aeschynanthus copelandii (Merr.) Schltr.
- Aeschynanthus cordifolius Hook.
- Aeschynanthus crassifolius (Elmer) Schltr.
- Aeschynanthus cryptanthus C.B.Clarke
- Aeschynanthus cuernosensis (Elmer) Schltr.
- Aeschynanthus curtisii C.B.Clarke
- Aeschynanthus curvicalyx Mendum
- Aeschynanthus dasycalyx Hallier f.
- Aeschynanthus dempoensis S.Moore
- Aeschynanthus dischidioides (Ridl.) D.J.Middleton
- Aeschynanthus dischorensis Schltr.
- Aeschynanthus ellipticus K.Schum. & Lauterb.
- Aeschynanthus elmeri Mendum
- Aeschynanthus elongatus C.B.Clarke
- Aeschynanthus everettianus Kraenzl.
- Aeschynanthus fecundus P.Woods
- Aeschynanthus firmus Kraenzl.
- Aeschynanthus flammeus Schltr.
- Aeschynanthus flavidus Mendum & P.Woods
- Aeschynanthus forbesii K.Schum.
- Aeschynanthus foxworthyi Kraenzl.
- Aeschynanthus fruticosus Ridl.
- Aeschynanthus fulgens Wall. ex R.Br.
- Aeschynanthus garrettii Craib
- Aeschynanthus geminatus Zoll. & Moritzi
- Aeschynanthus gesneriflorus S.Moore
- Aeschynanthus gjellerupii Schltr.
- Aeschynanthus glomeriflorus Kraenzl.
- Aeschynanthus gracilis C.S.P.Parish ex C.B.Clarke
- Aeschynanthus guttatus P.Woods
- Aeschynanthus hartleyi P.Woods
- Aeschynanthus hians C.B.Clarke
- Aeschynanthus hispidus Schltr.
- Aeschynanthus hookeri C.B.Clarke
- Aeschynanthus horsfieldii R.Br.
- Aeschynanthus hosseusii Pellegr.
- Aeschynanthus humilis Hemsl.
- Aeschynanthus impar Schltr.
- Aeschynanthus intraflavus Mendum
- Aeschynanthus irigaensis (Merr.) B.L.Burtt & P.Woods
- Aeschynanthus janowskyi Schltr.
- Aeschynanthus jouyi D.J.Middleton
- Aeschynanthus kermesinus Schltr.
- Aeschynanthus lancilimbus W.T.Wang
- Aeschynanthus lasianthus W.T.Wang
- Aeschynanthus lasiocalyx W.T.Wang
- Aeschynanthus lepidospermus C.B.Clarke
- Aeschynanthus leptocladus C.B.Clarke
- Aeschynanthus leucothamnos Kraenzl.
- Aeschynanthus ligustrinus Schltr.
- Aeschynanthus linearifolius C.E.C.Fisch.
- Aeschynanthus lineatus Craib
- Aeschynanthus littoralis (Merr.) Schltr.
- Aeschynanthus lobaticalyx Mendum
- Aeschynanthus loheri Kraenzl.
- Aeschynanthus longicaulis Wall. ex R.Br.
- Aeschynanthus longiflorus (Blume) A.DC.
- Aeschynanthus macgregorii (Merr.) Mansibang & Pelser
- Aeschynanthus macrocalyx C.B.Clarke
- Aeschynanthus madulidii Mendum
- Aeschynanthus magnificus Stapf
- Aeschynanthus malindangensis (Merr.) Mansibang & Pelser
- Aeschynanthus mannii Kurz ex C.B.Clarke
- Aeschynanthus maoi Debta & A.Shenoy
- Aeschynanthus marginatus Ridl.
- Aeschynanthus masoniae Kurz ex C.B.Clarke
- Aeschynanthus medogensis W.T.Wang
- Aeschynanthus membranifolius (Costantin) D.J.Middleton
- Aeschynanthus mendumiae D.J.Middleton
- Aeschynanthus mengxingensis W.T.Wang
- Aeschynanthus meo K.Schum.
- Aeschynanthus micranthus C.B.Clarke
- Aeschynanthus microcardius B.L.Burtt & R.A.Davidson
- Aeschynanthus microphyllus C.B.Clarke
- Aeschynanthus microtrichus C.B.Clarke
- Aeschynanthus mindanaensis (Merr.) Mansibang & Pelser
- Aeschynanthus miniaceus B.L.Burtt & P.Woods
- Aeschynanthus miniatus Lindl.
- Aeschynanthus minutifolius D.J.Middleton
- Aeschynanthus mjoebergii (Merr.) S.S.Ying
- Aeschynanthus mollis Schltr.
- Aeschynanthus monetaria Dunn
- Aeschynanthus moningerae (Merr.) Chun
- Aeschynanthus montisucris P.Royen
- Aeschynanthus murthyanus R.Kr.Singh & Arigela
- Aeschynanthus musaensis P.Woods
- Aeschynanthus myrtifolius Schltr.
- Aeschynanthus nabirensis Kaneh. & Hatus.
- Aeschynanthus nervosus (Elmer) Schltr.
- Aeschynanthus nummularius (Burkill & S.Moore) K.Schum.
- Aeschynanthus obconicus C.B.Clarke
- Aeschynanthus oligodontus (Merr.) S.S.Ying
- Aeschynanthus ovatus C.B.Clarke
- Aeschynanthus oxychlamys Mendum
- Aeschynanthus pachyanthus Schltr.
- Aeschynanthus panayensis (Merr.) Mansibang & Pelser
- Aeschynanthus papuanus (Schltr.) B.L.Burtt
- Aeschynanthus parasiticus (Roxb.) Wall.
- Aeschynanthus parviflorus (D.Don) Spreng.
- Aeschynanthus pedunculatus D.J.Middleton
- Aeschynanthus pentatrichomatus A.B.Tobias, Mansibang, Thorogood & Malabrigo
- Aeschynanthus pergracilis Kraenzl.
- Aeschynanthus perrottetii A.DC.
- Aeschynanthus persimilis Craib
- Aeschynanthus phaeotrichus Schltr.
- Aeschynanthus philippinensis C.B.Clarke
- Aeschynanthus planipetiolatus H.W.Li
- Aeschynanthus podocarpus C.B.Clarke
- Aeschynanthus poilanei Pellegr.
- Aeschynanthus polillensis Kraenzl.
- Aeschynanthus praelongus Kraenzl.
- Aeschynanthus pseudohybridus Mendum
- Aeschynanthus pulcher (Blume) G.Don
- Aeschynanthus pullei Schltr.
- Aeschynanthus radicans Jack
- Aeschynanthus rarus Schltr.
- Aeschynanthus reiekensis Lalhlupuii, S.D.Khomdram & S.D.Yumkham
- Aeschynanthus rejieae Olimpos & Mansibang
- Aeschynanthus rhododendron Ridl.
- Aeschynanthus rhodophyllus Kraenzl.
- Aeschynanthus rizalensis (Merr.) Mansibang & Pelser
- Aeschynanthus roseoflorus Mendum
- Aeschynanthus roseus Schltr.
- Aeschynanthus rubiginosus Teijsm. & Binn.
- Aeschynanthus sanguineus Schltr.
- Aeschynanthus scottii D.J.Middleton & H.J.Atkins
- Aeschynanthus serpens Kraenzl.
- Aeschynanthus setosus Kraenzl.
- Aeschynanthus sinolongicalyx W.T.Wang
- Aeschynanthus siphonanthus C.B.Clarke
- Aeschynanthus smaragdinus F.Wen & J.Q.Qin
- Aeschynanthus sojolianus Mendum & L.E.R.Galloway
- Aeschynanthus solomonensis P.Woods
- Aeschynanthus speciosus Hook.
- Aeschynanthus stenocalyx Kraenzl.
- Aeschynanthus stenosepalus J.Anthony
- Aeschynanthus stenosiphon Schltr.
- Aeschynanthus suborbiculatus S.Moore
- Aeschynanthus succineus Lei Cai & L.W.Lin
- Aeschynanthus superbus C.B.Clarke
- Aeschynanthus tenericaulis Diels
- Aeschynanthus tengchungensis W.T.Wang
- Aeschynanthus teysmannianus Miq.
- Aeschynanthus tirapensis Bhattacharyya
- Aeschynanthus tongbiguanensis Lei Cai & L.W.Lin
- Aeschynanthus torricellensis Schltr.
- Aeschynanthus trichocalyx Kraenzl.
- Aeschynanthus tricolor Hook.
- Aeschynanthus truncatus (Elmer) Schltr.
- Aeschynanthus tubiflorus C.B.Clarke
- Aeschynanthus tubulosus J.Anthony
- Aeschynanthus urdanetensis (Elmer) Mansibang & Pelser
- Aeschynanthus verticillatus C.B.Clarke
- Aeschynanthus vinaceus P.Woods
- Aeschynanthus viridiflorus Teijsm. & Binn.
- Aeschynanthus volubilis Jack
- Aeschynanthus wallichii Benn.
- Aeschynanthus wangii Y.H.Tan & H.B.Ding
- Aeschynanthus wardii Merr.
- Aeschynanthus warianus Schltr.
- Aeschynanthus zamboangensis Kraenzl.
