= Wang Wencai =

Chinese plant taxonomist (1926–2022)

- 王文采
- Born: 5 June 1926; Jinan, Shandong, China
- Died: 16 November 2022 (aged 96); Beijing, China
- Education: Beijing Normal University
- Spouse: Cheng Jiazhen (程嘉珍)
- Scientific career
- Fields: Plant taxonomy
- Institutions: Institute of Botany, Chinese Academy of Sciences
- Academic advisors: Hu Xiansu

Wang Wencai (Chinese: 王文采; pinyin: Wáng Wéncǎi; Wade–Giles: Wang Wen-Tsai; 5 June 1926 – 16 November 2022) was a Chinese plant taxonomist and academic of the Chinese Academy of Sciences. He was a member of the China Democratic League.

== Biography ==
Wang was born in Jinan, Shandong, on 5 June 1926, while his ancestral home is in Ye County (now Laizhou). His father Wang Lanyu (王蓝玉) was a merchant and his mother Zhao Yanwen (赵燕文) was a native of Peiping (now Beijing). He had an elder half brother and two elder half sisters. In 1937, Wang moved to Peiping with his mother, where he attended Beiping No. 4 High School. In 1945, he enrolled at the National Peiping Normal University (now Beijing Normal University), where he majored in the Department of Biology. After graduating in 1949, he stayed and taught at the university.

Wang was assigned as an assistant to the Institute of Botany, Chinese Academy of Sciences in March 1950. He got married on 24 June 1951 with Cheng Jiazhen (程嘉珍), and had three children: Wang Chong (王冲), Wang Zheng (王筝), Wang Hui Hulthén (王卉) and four grandchildren. He became assistant research fellow in 1953, associate research fellow in 1978, and research fellow in 1982.

On 16 November 2022, Wang died from an illness in Beijing, at the age of 96.

== Contributions ==
Wang was engaged in the taxonomic research of Ranunculaceae, Urticaceae, Boraginaceae, Cichoriaceae and other families, and had found 28 new genera and about 1370 new species; According to the evolutionary trends revealed by him, the taxonomic systems of Delphinium, Thalictrum, Adonis, Clematis, Stephania, Boehmeria, Epinephelus and Cichorium were revised and a taxonomic system was established for the three genera: Sarcandra, Microporus, and Epinephelus. He proposed 16 discontinuous distributed specimens and 3 migration routes of East Asian flora, which is a comprehensive study on the classification of Ranunculaceae, Gesneriaceae, Urticaceae and other taxa. Wang took the lead in organizing the compilation of the "Illustrated Book of Higher Plants of China" and was also one of the main contributors to the "Flora of China". He made important contributions to understanding the status of China's plant resources and promoting the development of my country's agriculture, forestry and animal husbandry.

Wang Wencai devoted special efforts to the development of medicinal plant taxonomy. In the initial stage of the development of medicinal botany, he guided and trained the first batch of medicinal plant taxonomists, personally identified a large number of specimens from the third national census of Chinese herbal medicine resources, and reviewed and approved the "China Traditional Chinese Medicine Resources" and "Chinese Medicinal Materials". "Resource Atlas" and other works, guided the compilation of the first postgraduate textbook on medicinal plant taxonomy, and as the director of the editorial board played a key role in the compilation of "Chinese Medicinal Flora" and how to integrate it with the international plant classification system.

== Honours and awards ==
- 1987 State Natural Science Award (First Class) for the Atlas of Chinese Higher Plants and Key to Chinese Higher Plants
- 1993 Member of the Chinese Academy of Sciences (CAS)
- 1997 Science and Technology Progress Award of the Ho Leung Ho Lee Foundation
- 2009 State Natural Science Award (First Class) for Flora of China
