= List of plant genus names with etymologies (L–P) =

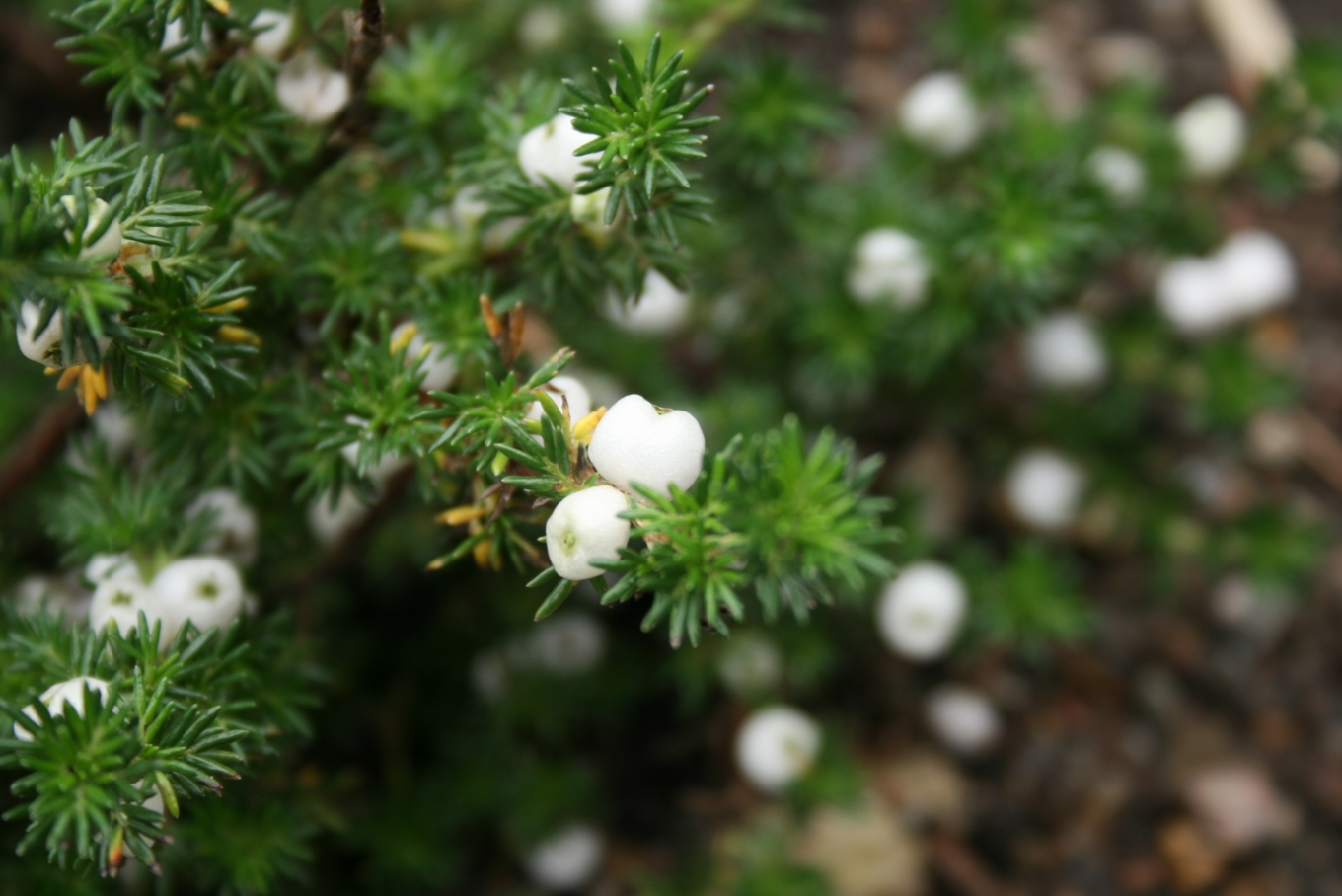
Margyricarpus, derived from the Greek for "pearl fruit"

Since the first printing of Carl Linnaeus's Species Plantarum in 1753, plants have been assigned one epithet or name for their species and one name for their genus, a grouping of related species. Many of these plants are listed in Stearn's Dictionary of Plant Names for Gardeners. William Stearn (1911–2001) was one of the pre-eminent British botanists of the 20th century: a Librarian of the Royal Horticultural Society, a president of the Linnean Society and the original drafter of the International Code of Nomenclature for Cultivated Plants.

The first column below contains seed-bearing genera from Stearn and other sources as listed, excluding those names that no longer appear in more modern works, such as Plants of the World by Maarten J. M. Christenhusz (lead author), Michael F. Fay and Mark W. Chase. Plants of the World is also used for the family and order classification for each genus. The second column gives a meaning or derivation of the word, such as a language of origin. The last two columns indicate additional citations.

== Key ==
Latin: = derived from Latin (otherwise Greek, except as noted)
Ba = listed in Ross Bayton's The Gardener's Botanical
Bu = listed in Lotte Burkhardt's Index of Eponymic Plant Names
CS = listed in both Allen Coombes's The A to Z of Plant Names and Stearn's Dictionary of Plant Names for Gardeners
G = listed in David Gledhill's The Names of Plants
St = listed in Stearn's Dictionary of Plant Names for Gardeners

== Genera ==
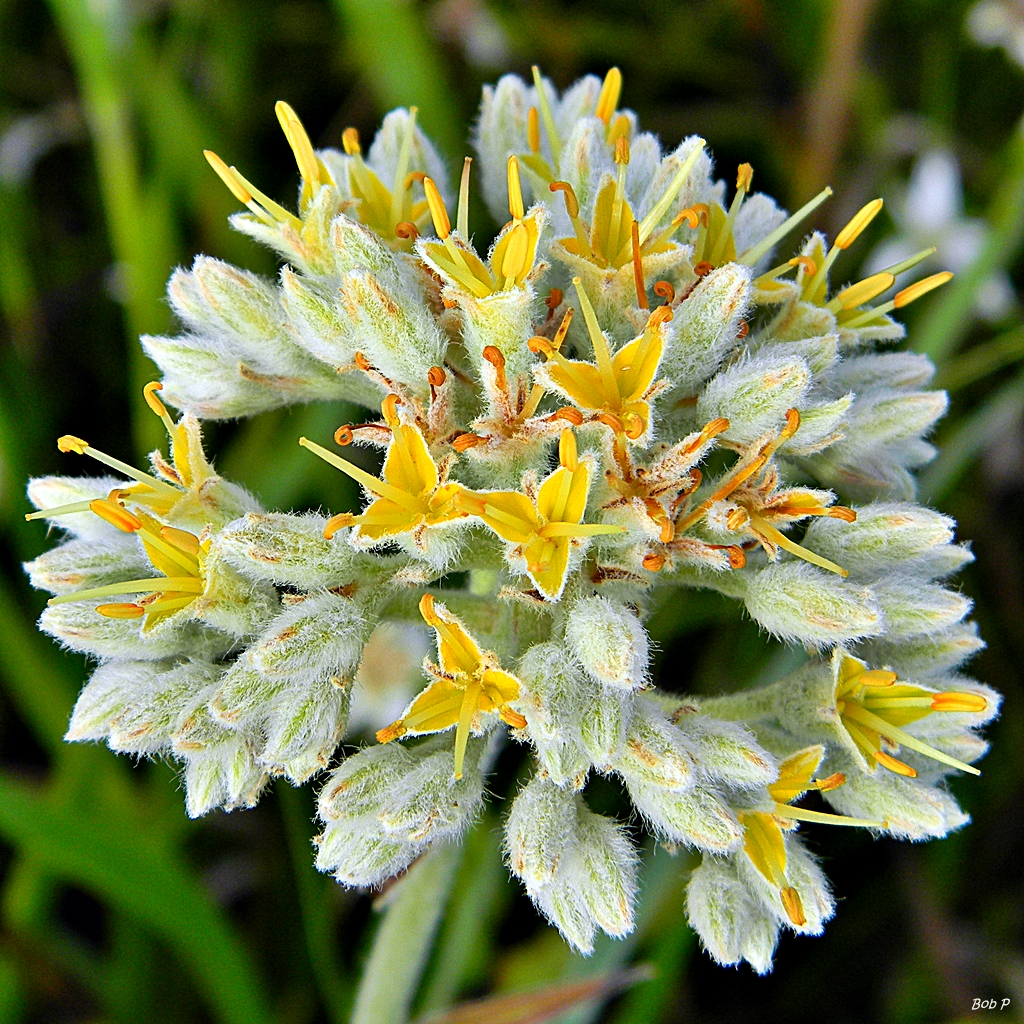
Lachnanthes

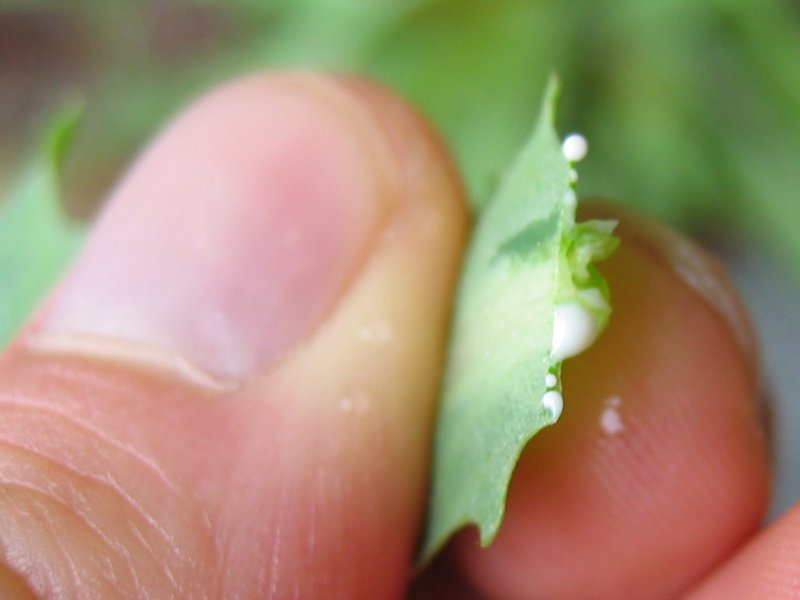
Lactuca sap

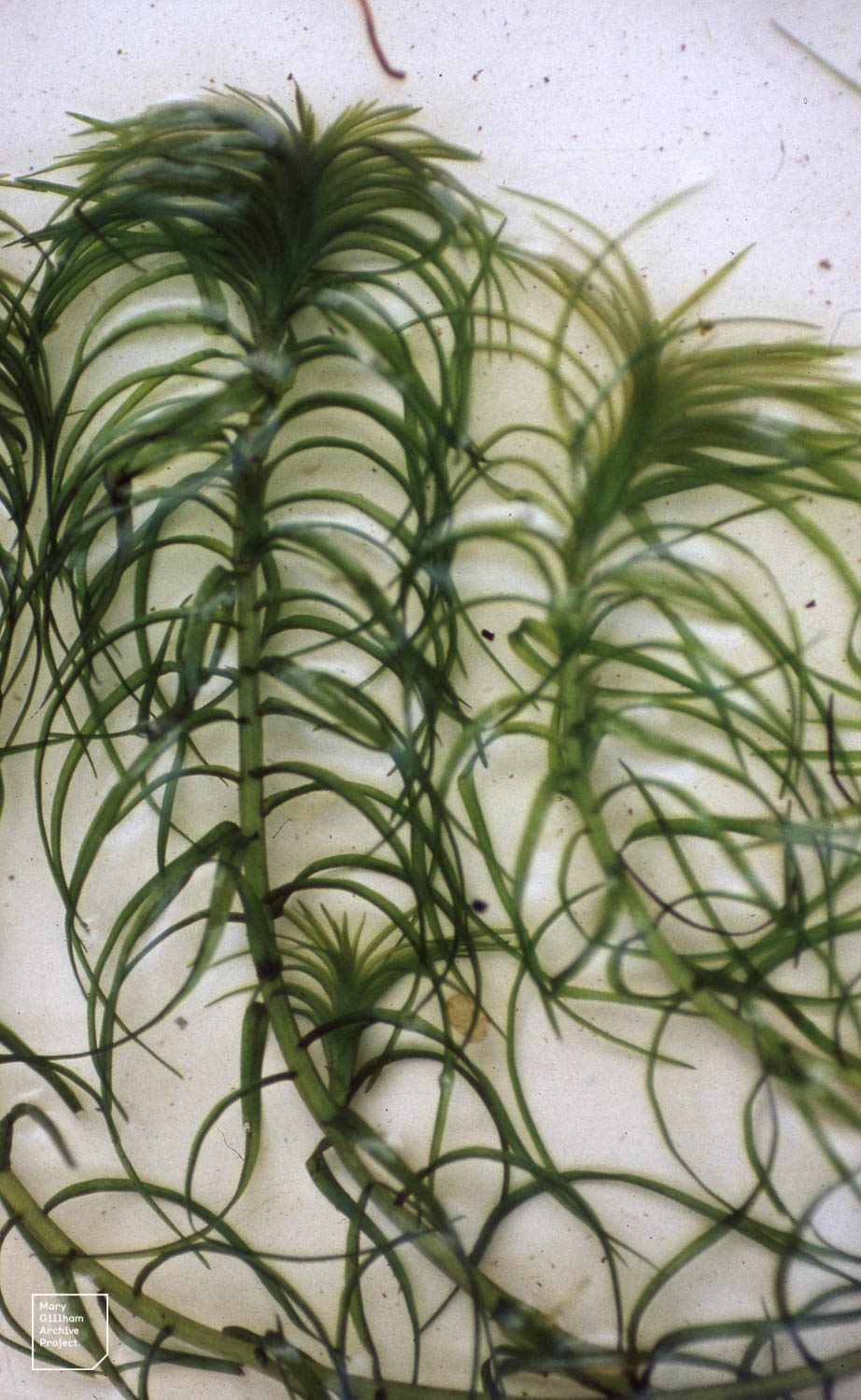
Lagarosiphon

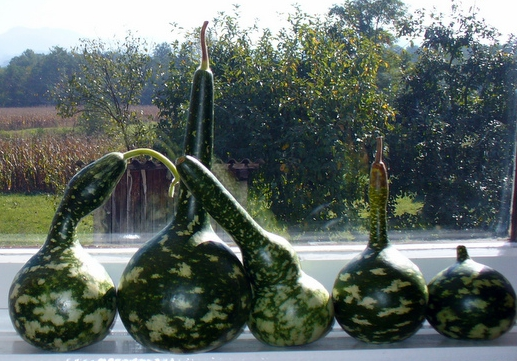
Lagenaria

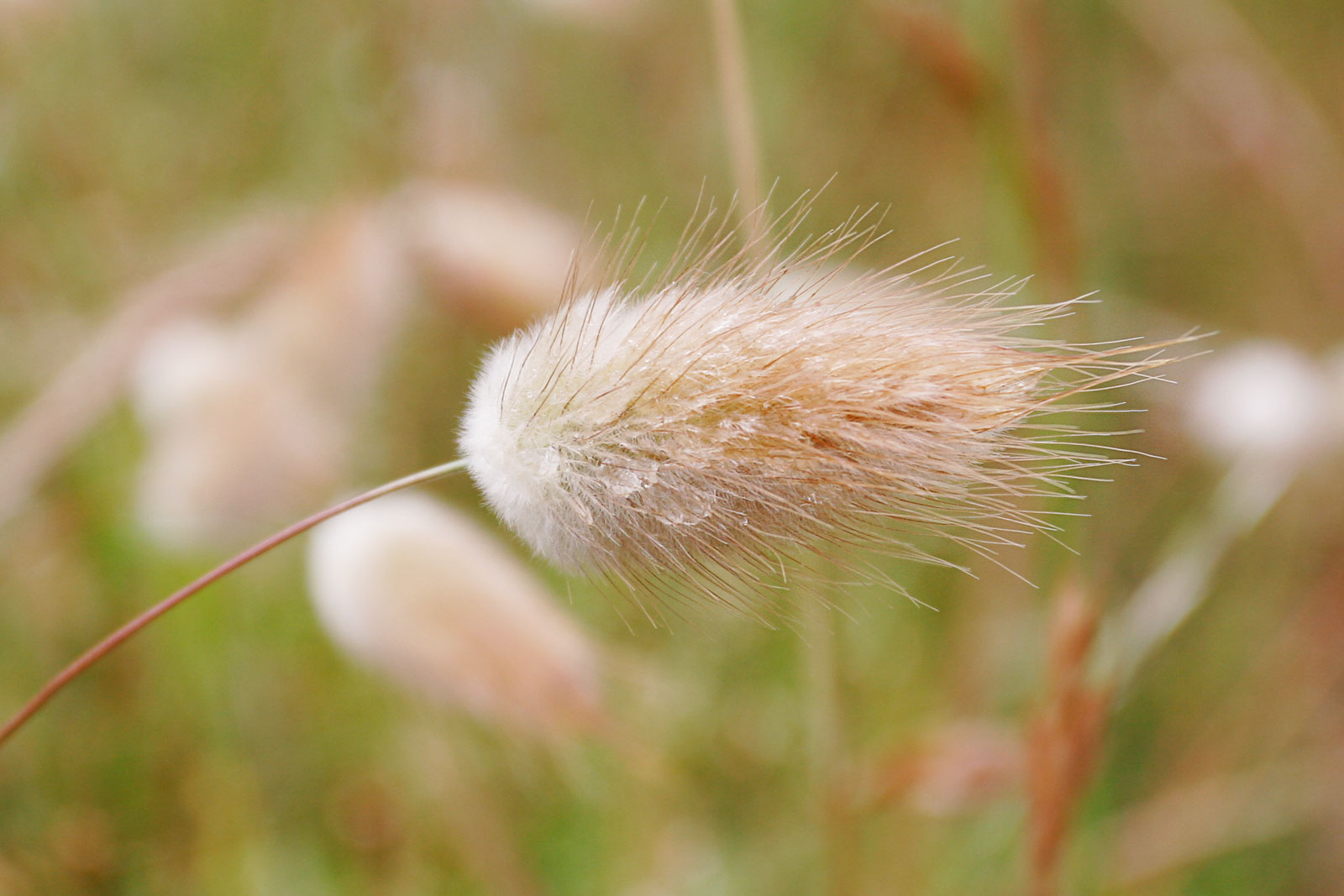
Lagurus

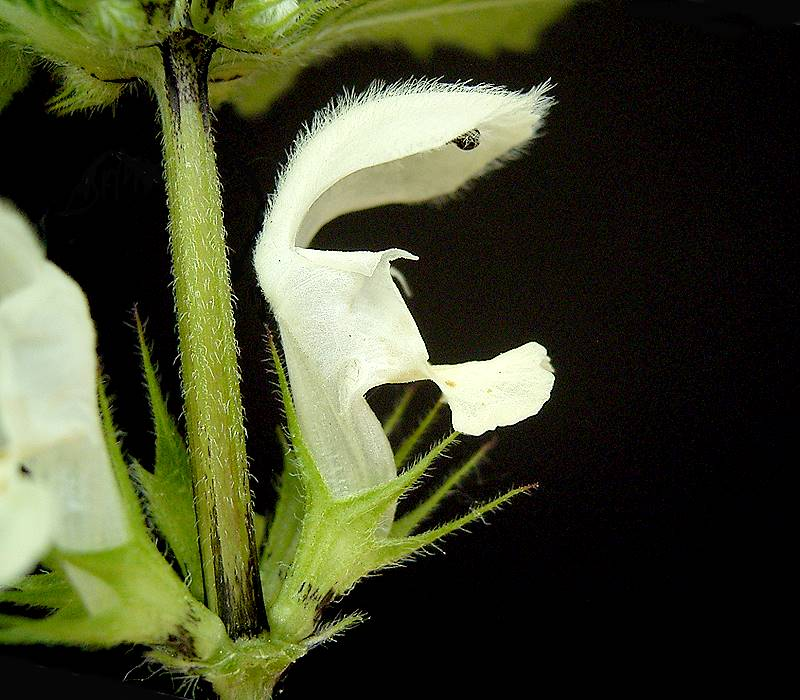
Lamium

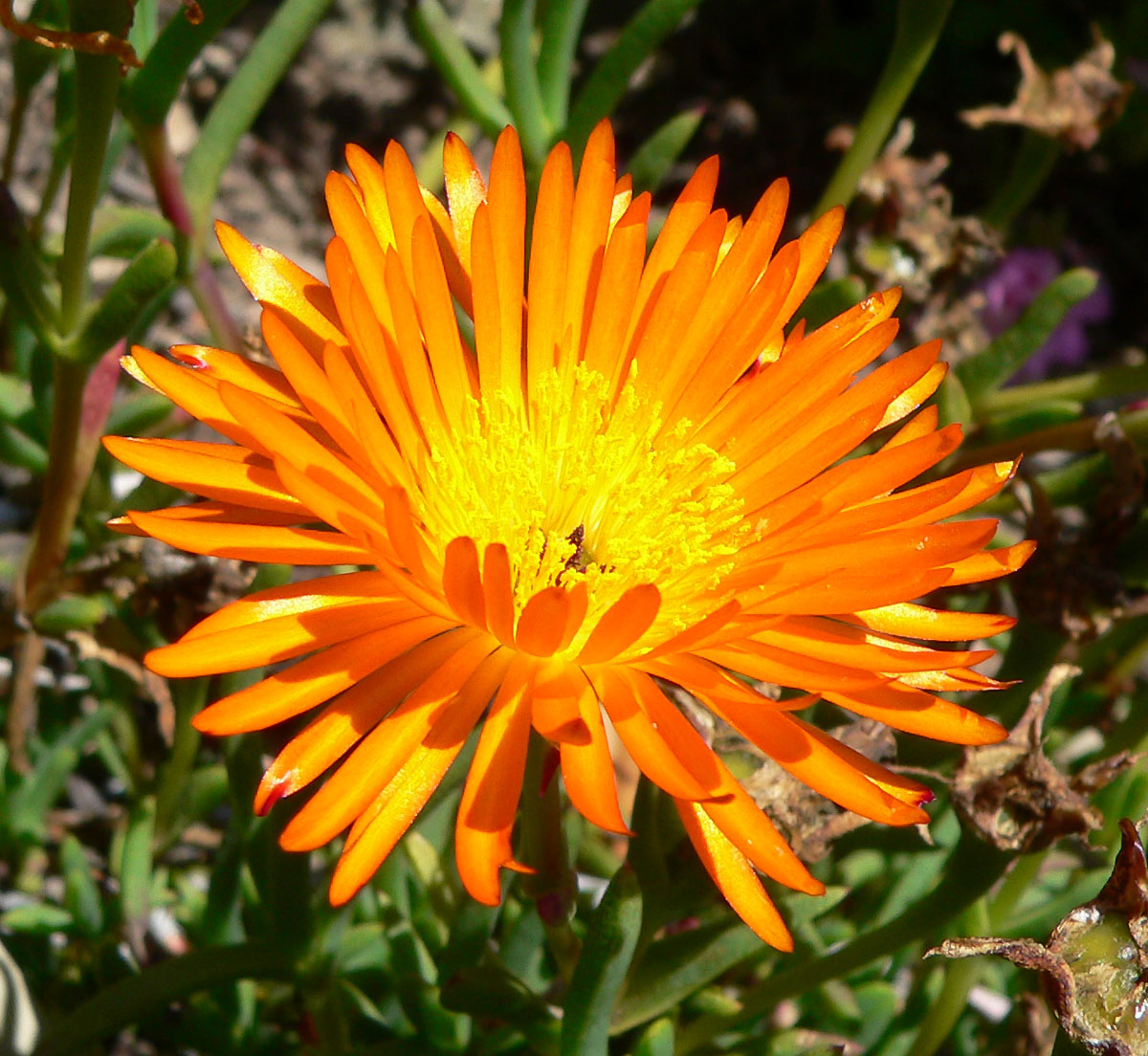
Lampranthus

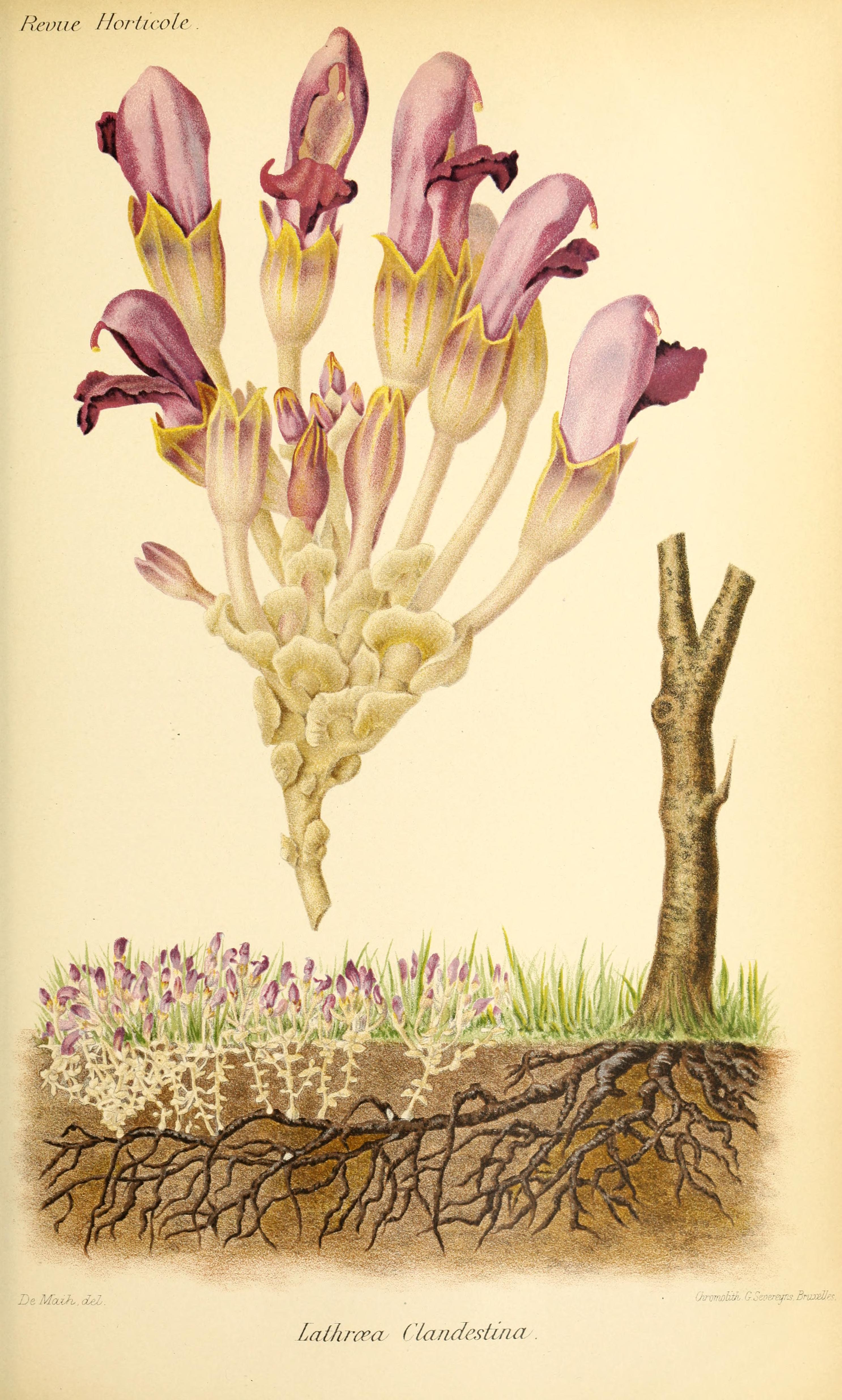
Illustration of Lathraea

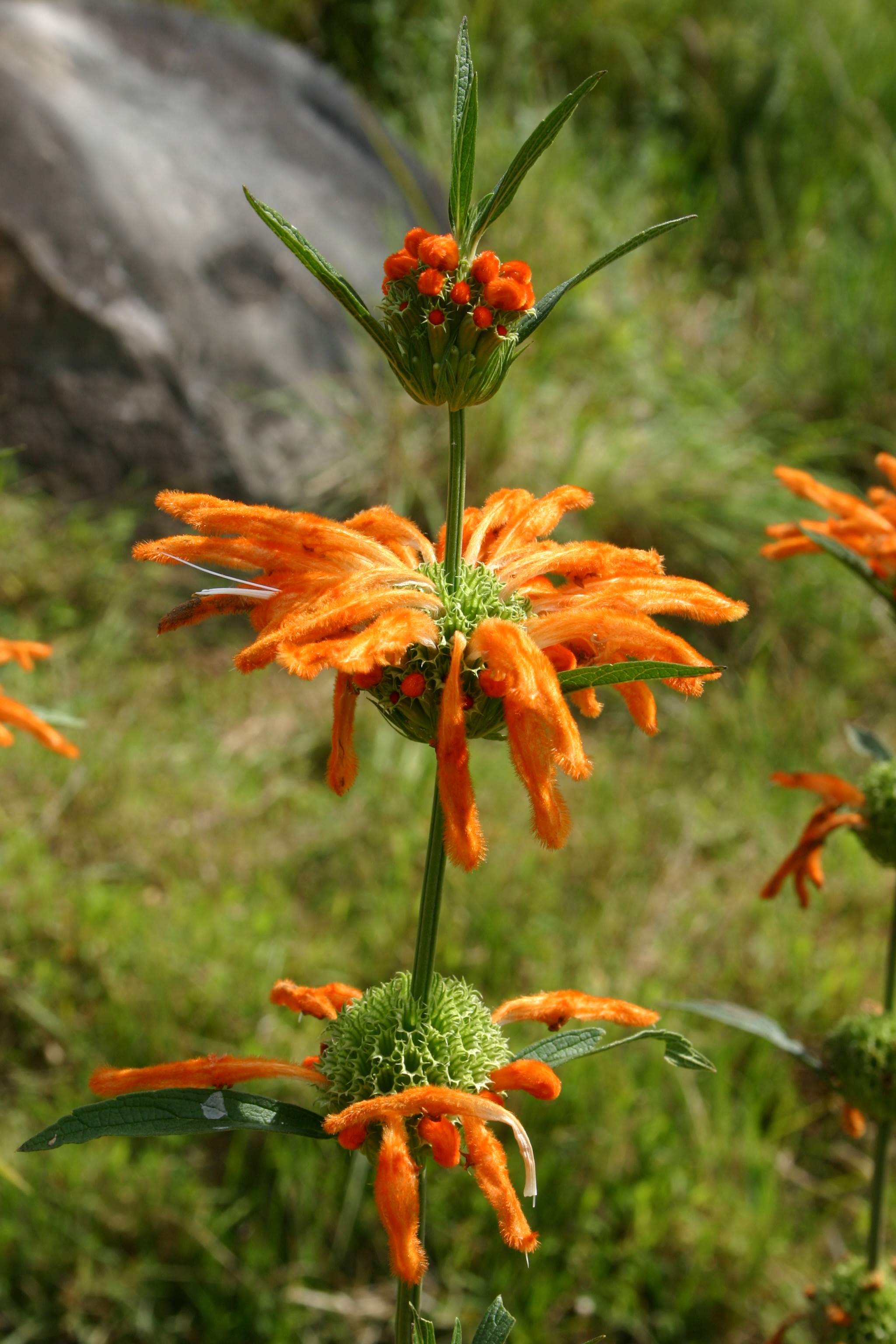
Leonotis

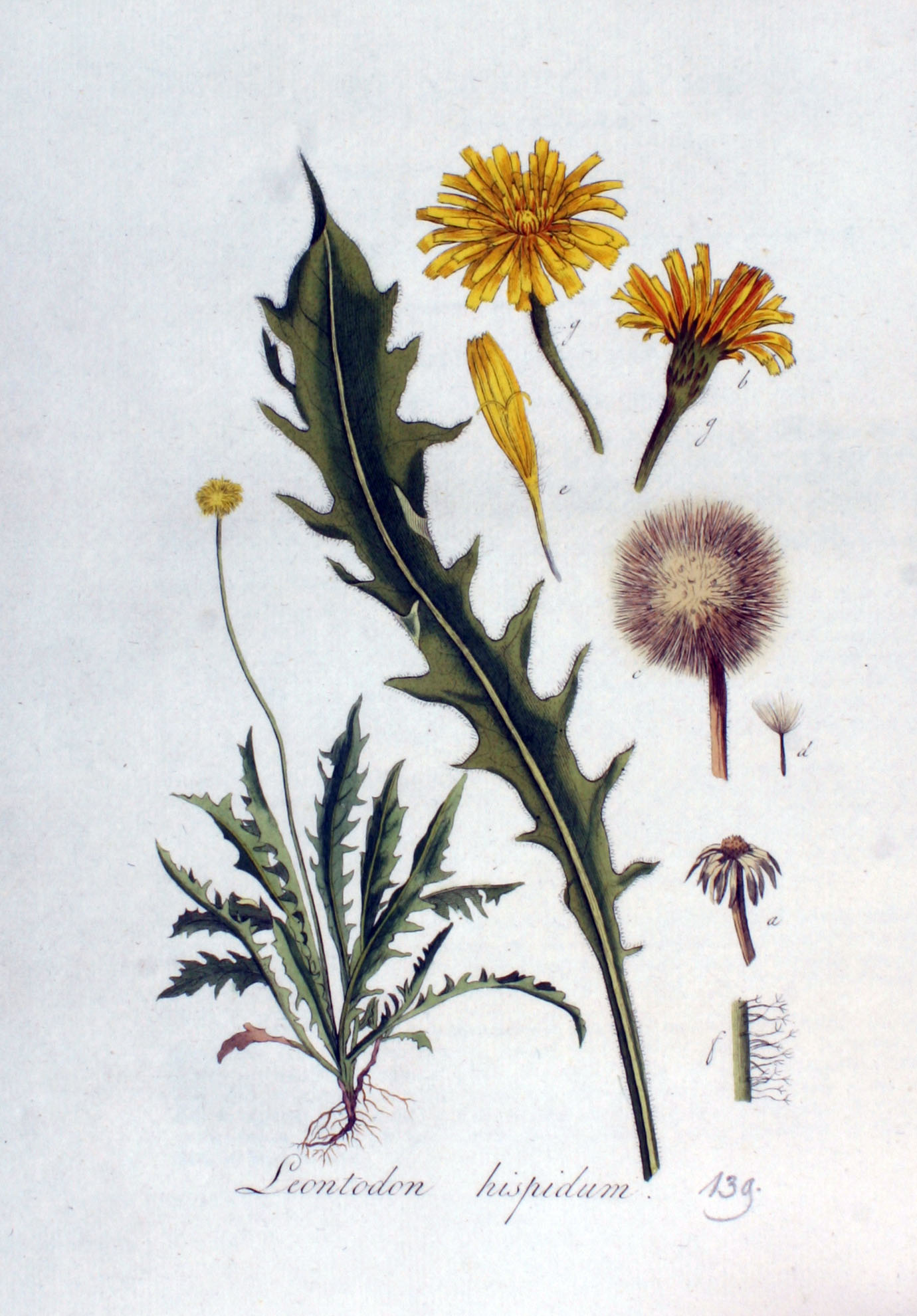
Illustration of Leontodon

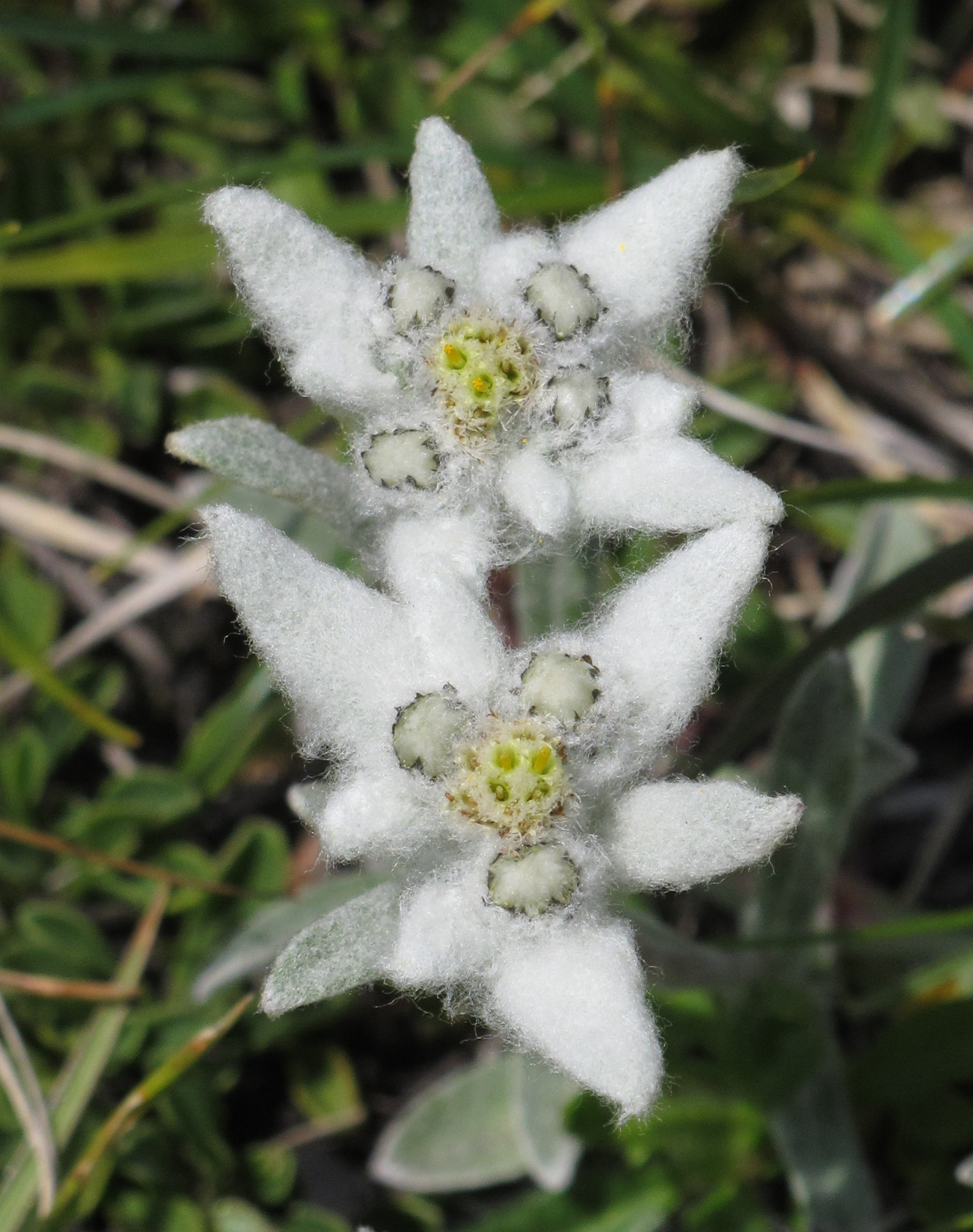
Leontopodium

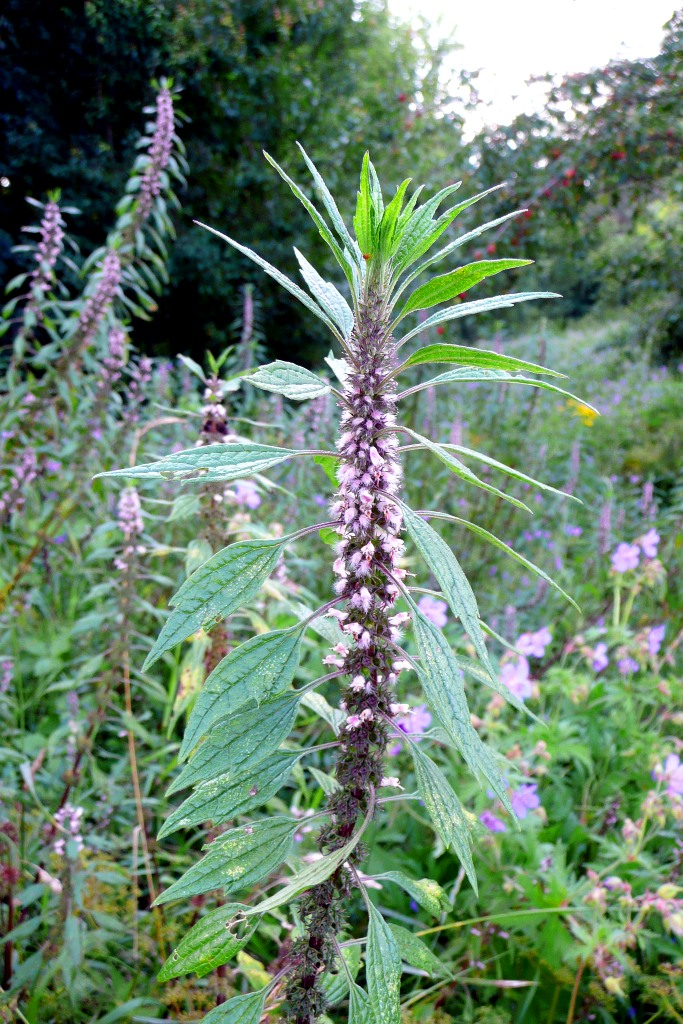
Leonurus

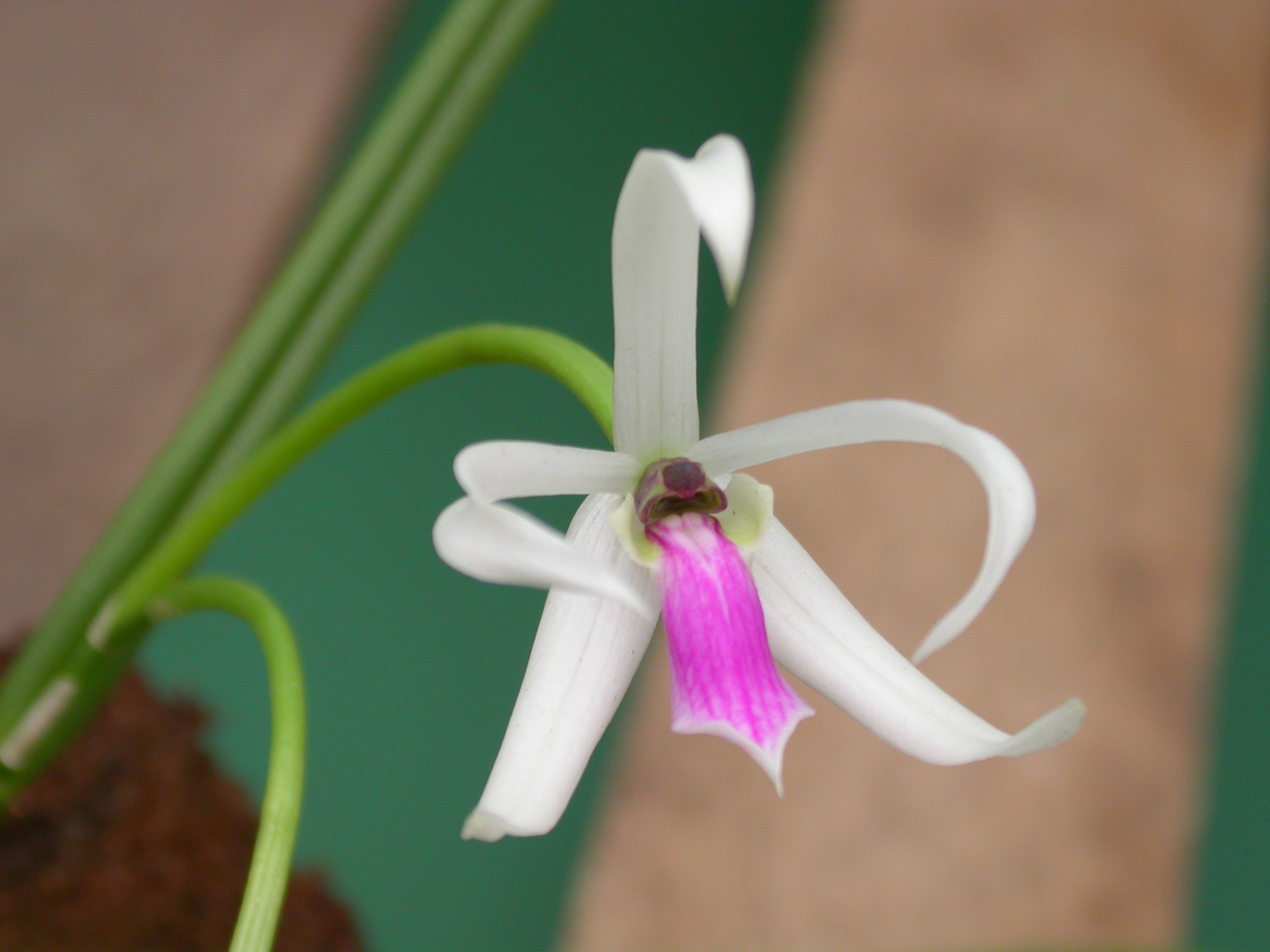
Leptotes

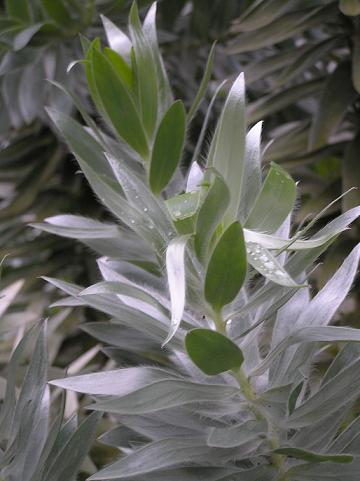
Leucadendron

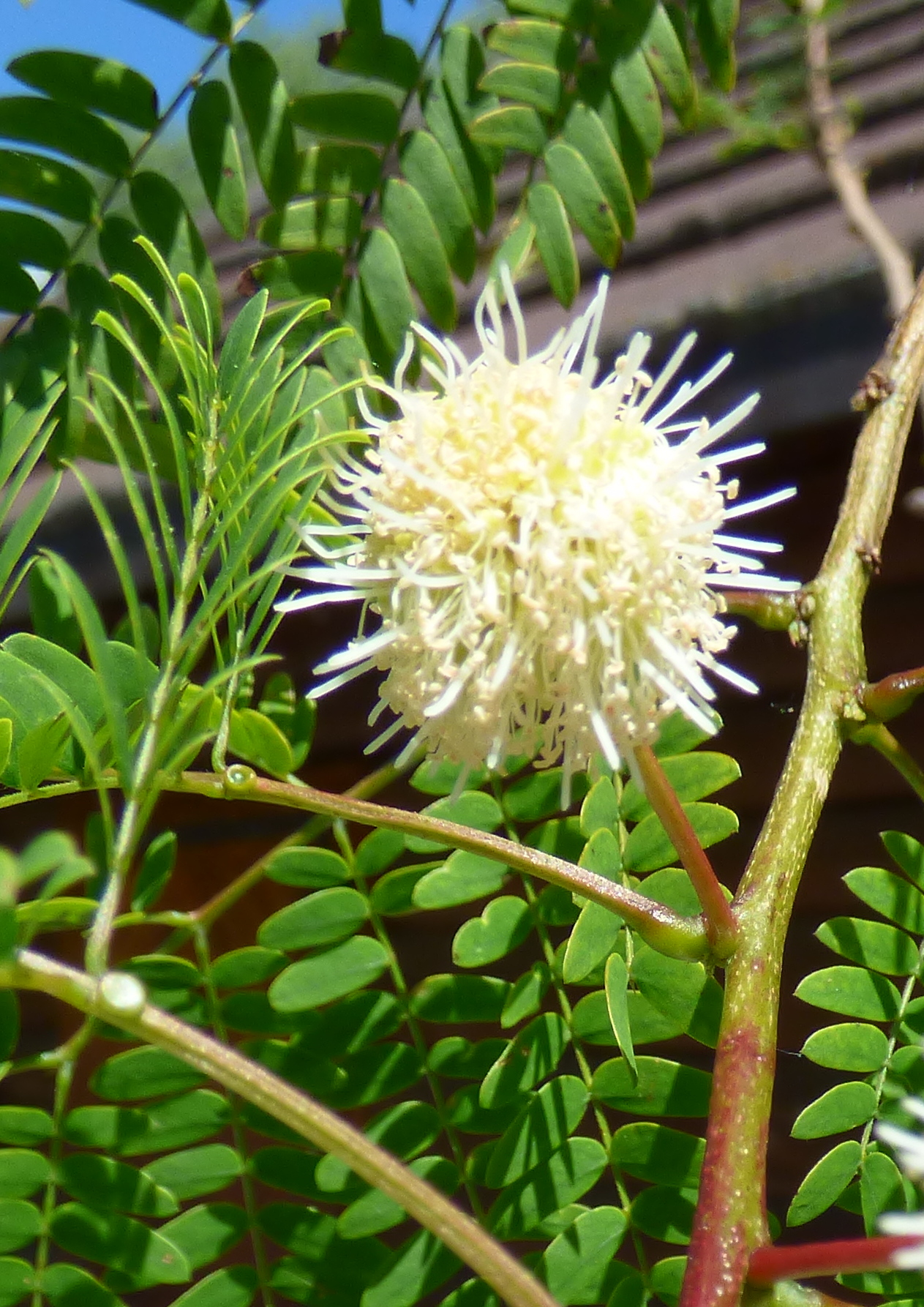
Leucaena

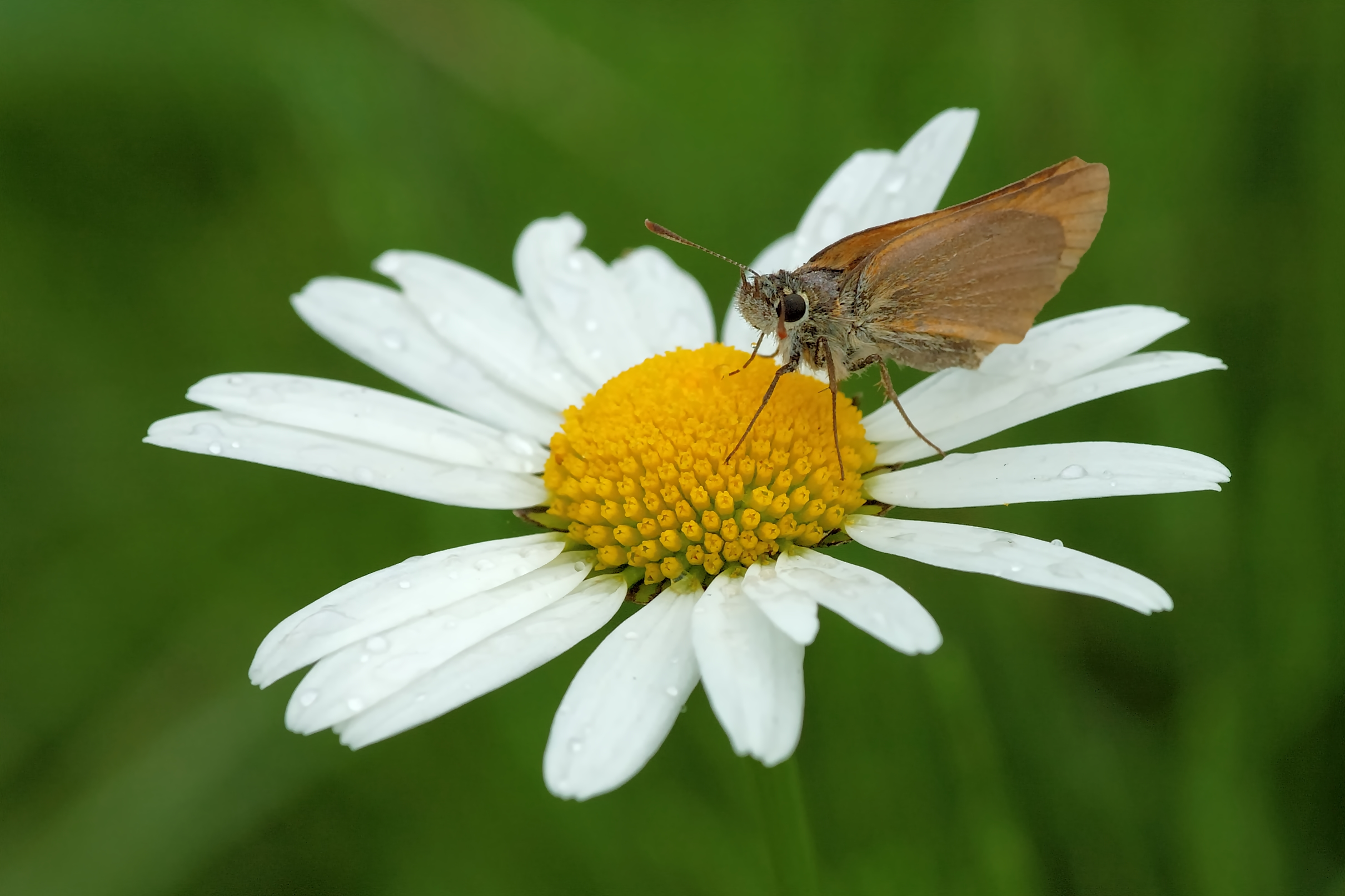
Leucanthemum and a butterfly

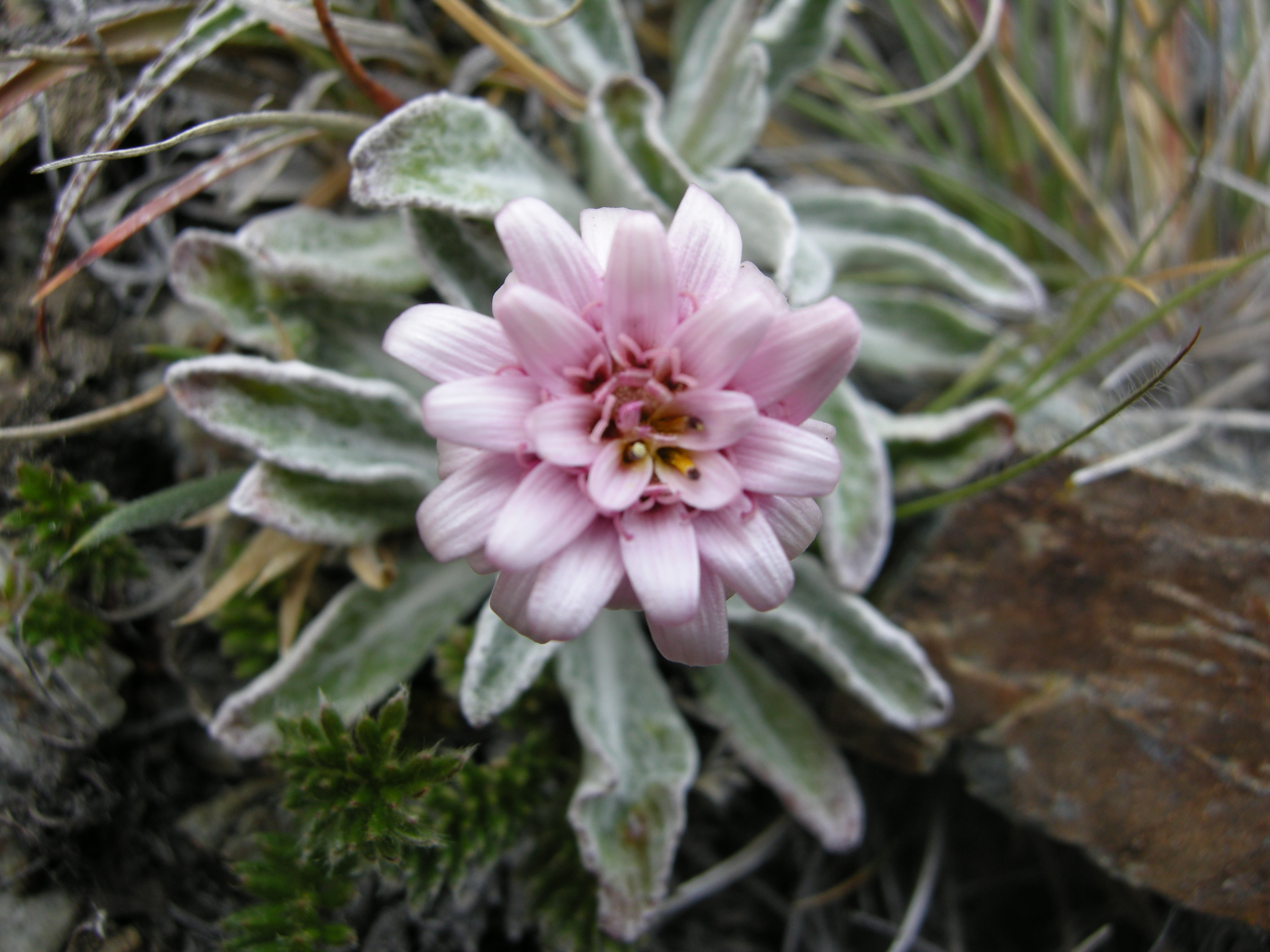
Leucheria

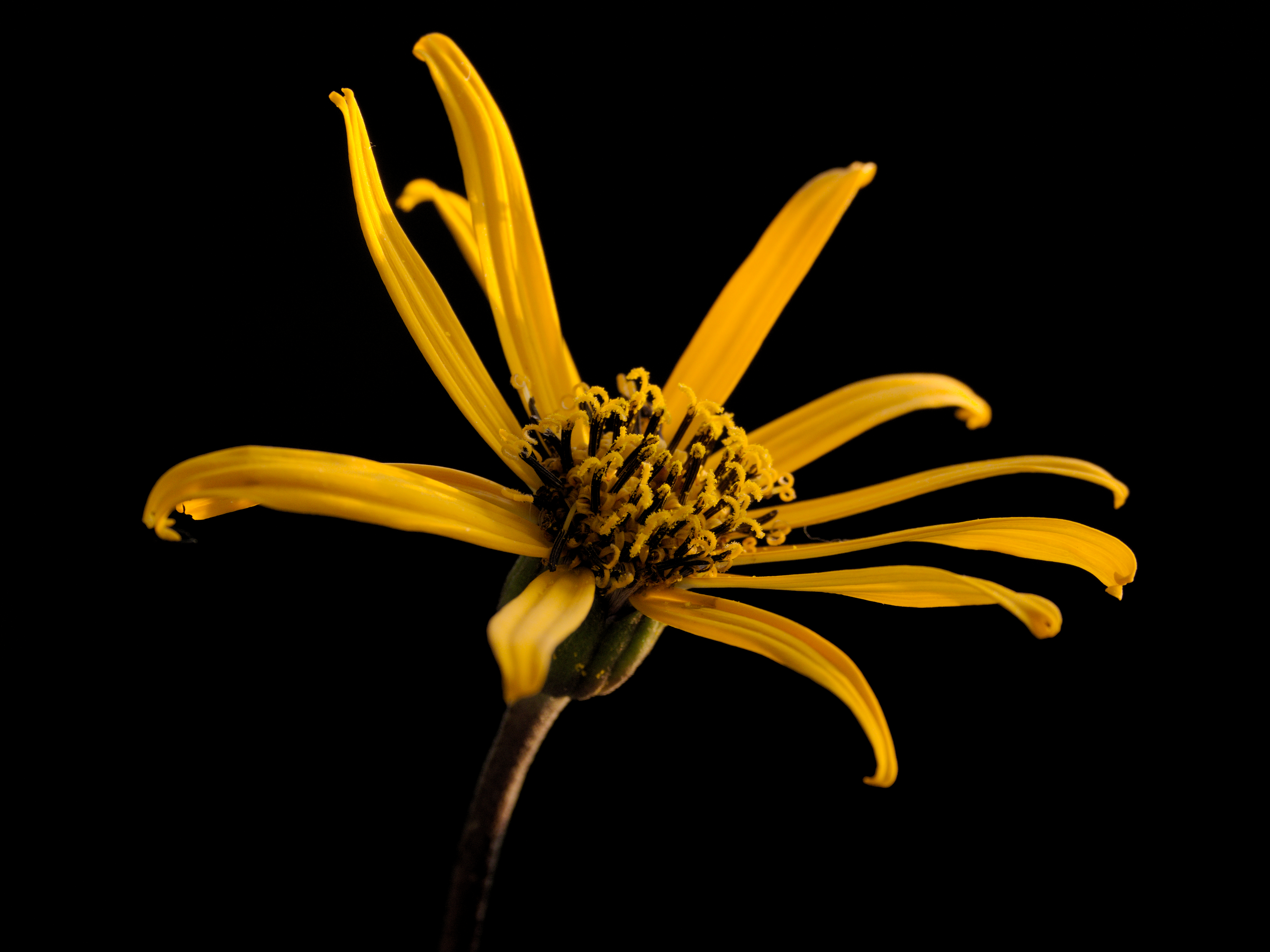
Ligularia

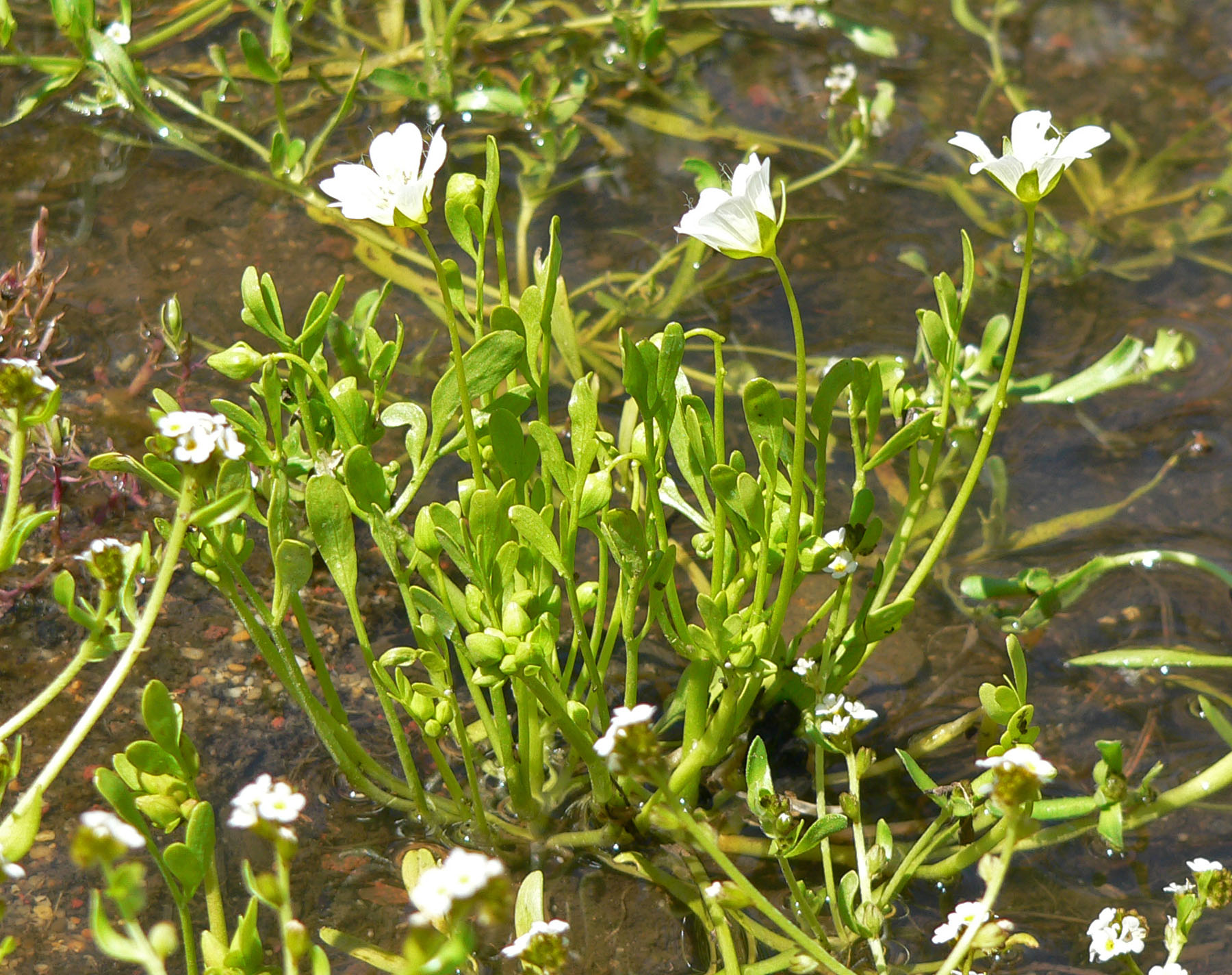
Limnanthes

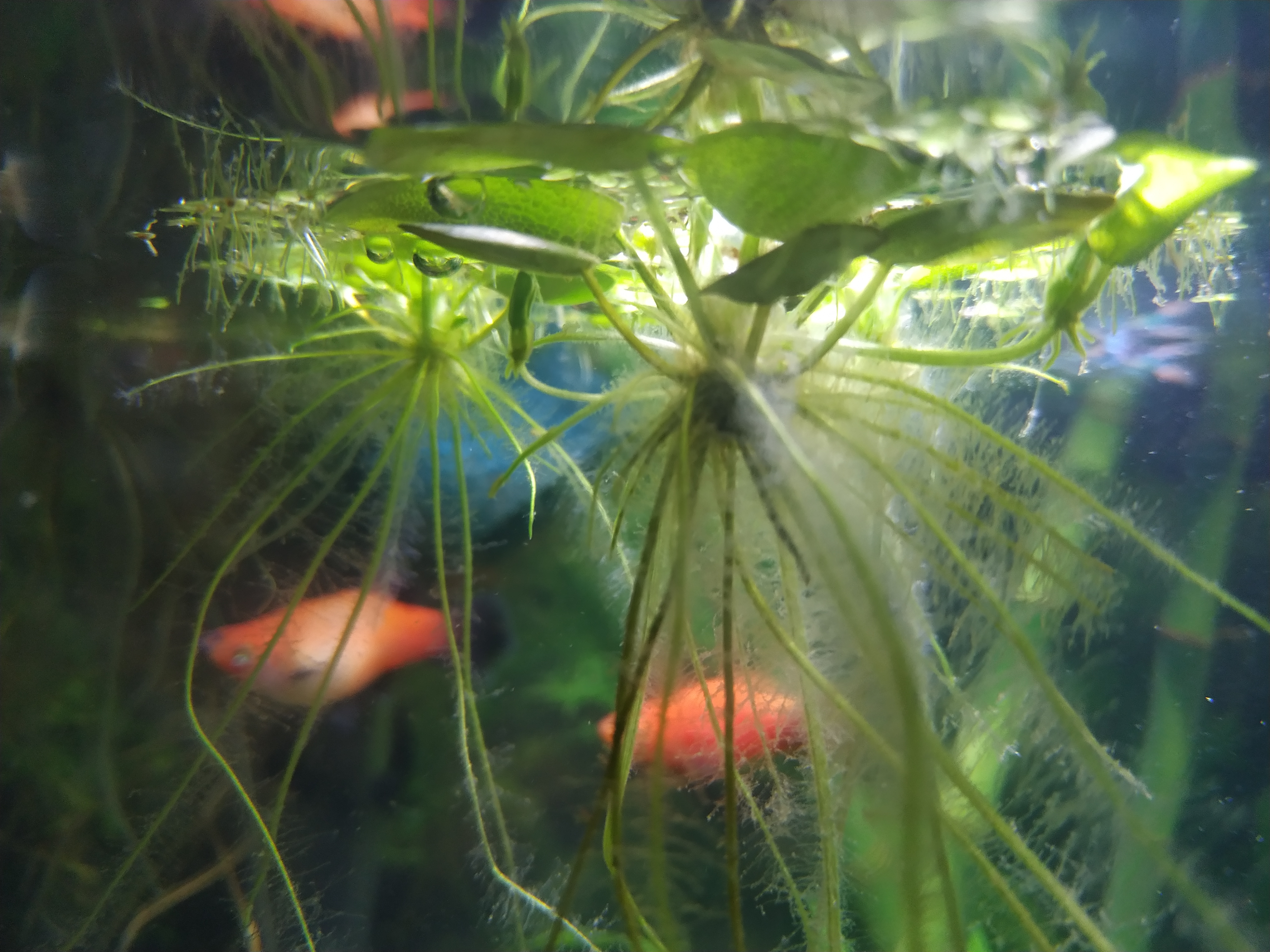
Limnobium in an aquarium

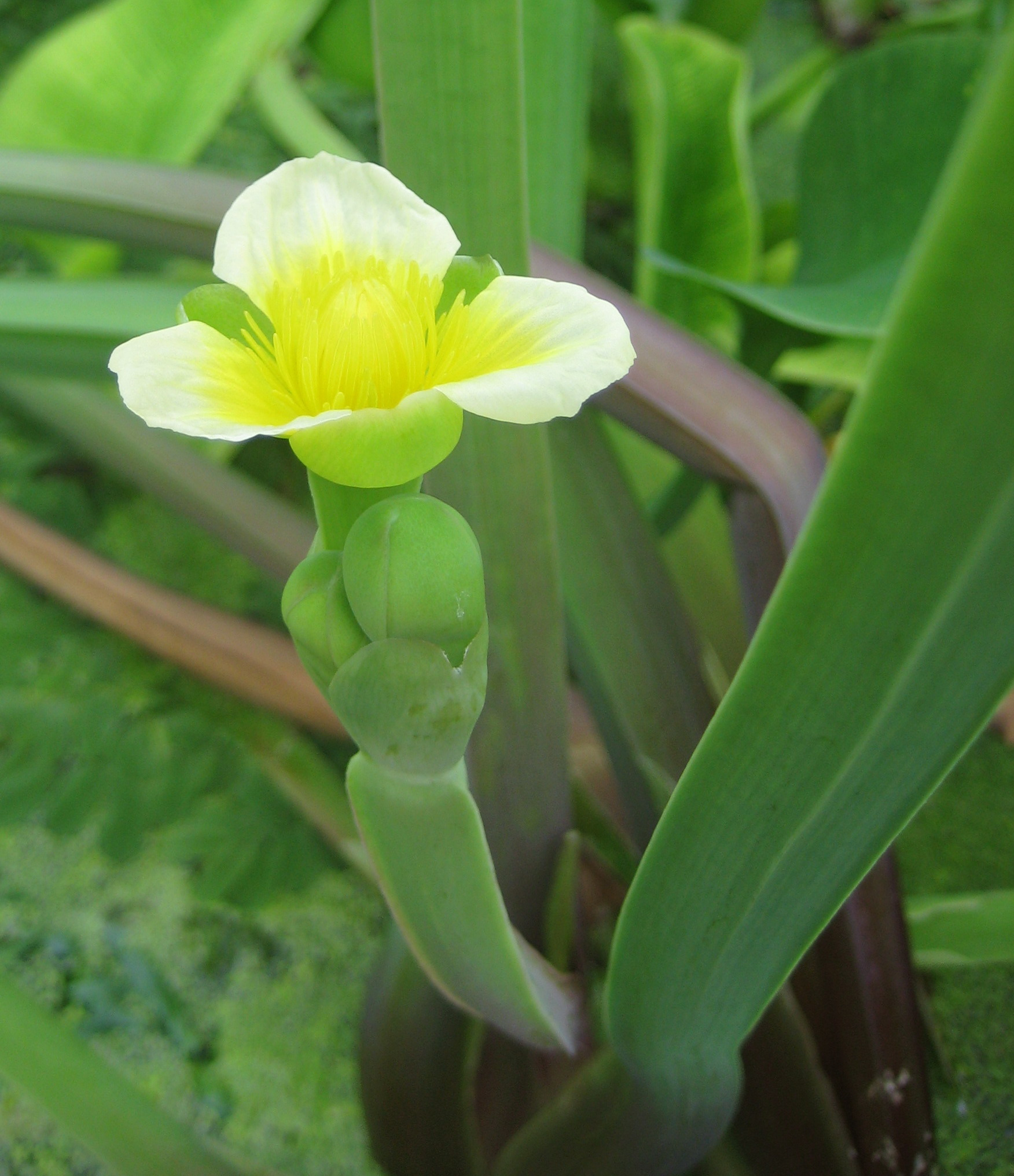
Limnocharis

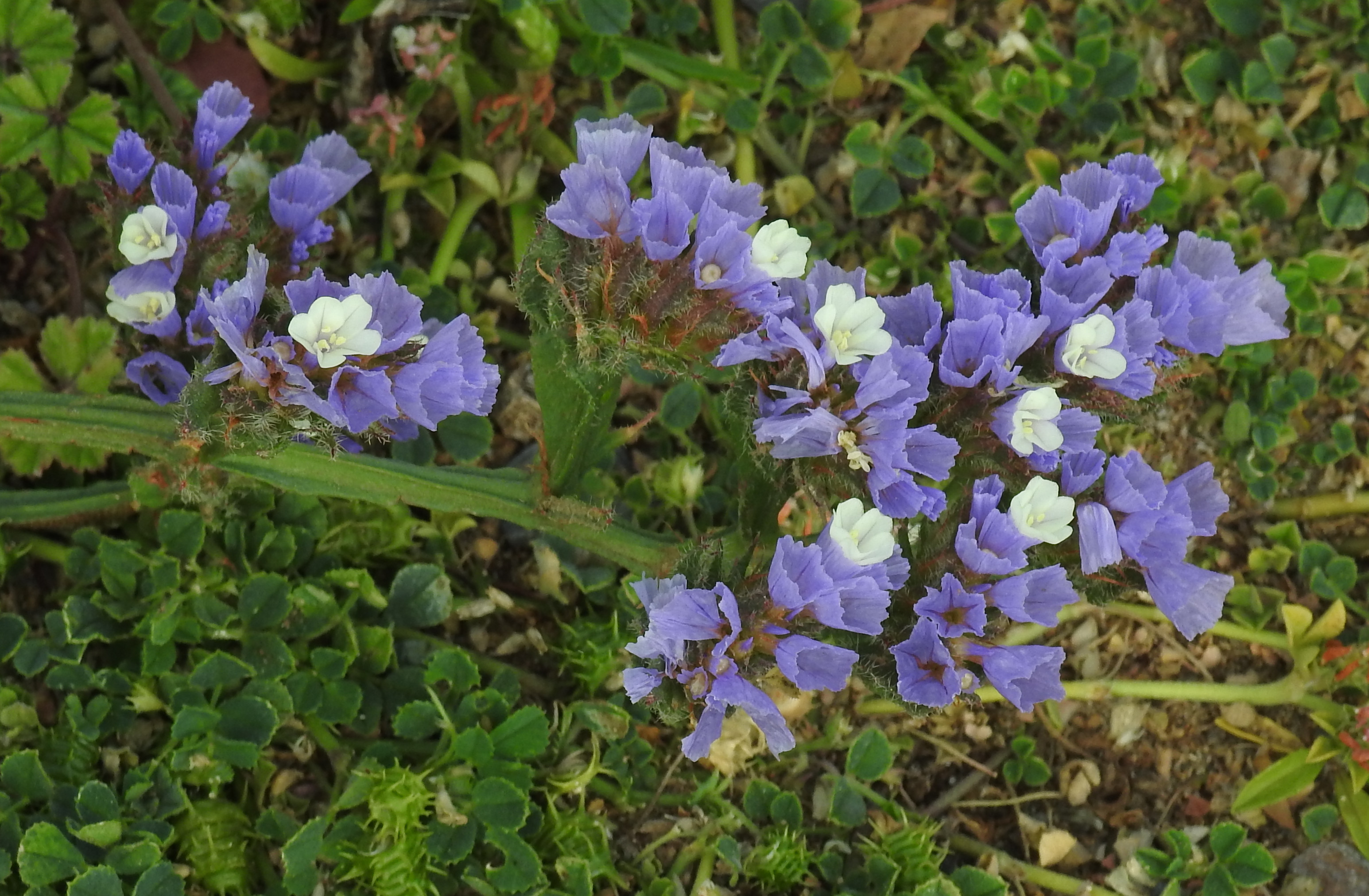
Limonium

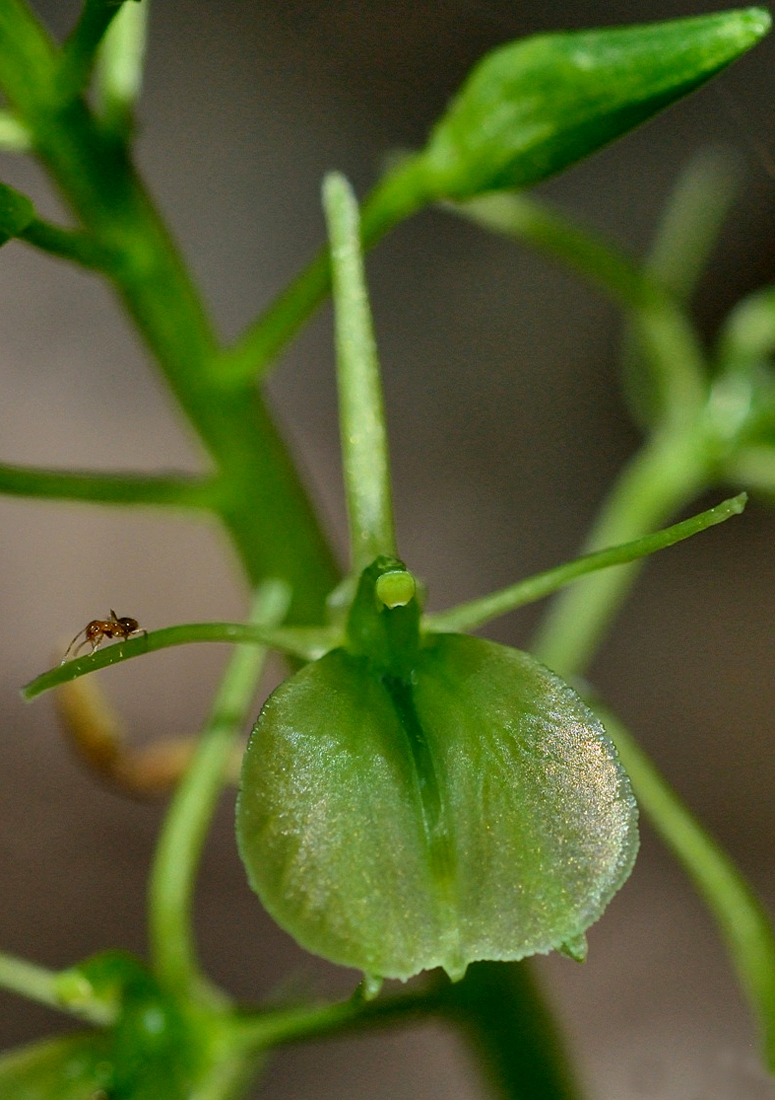
Liparis

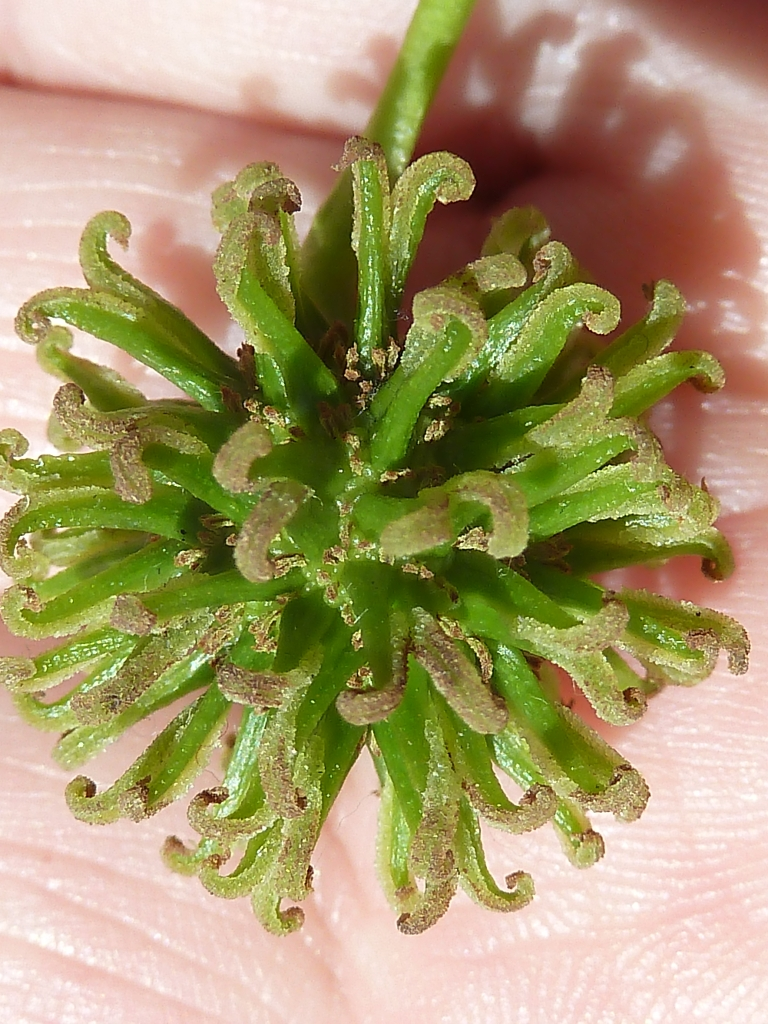
Liquidambar

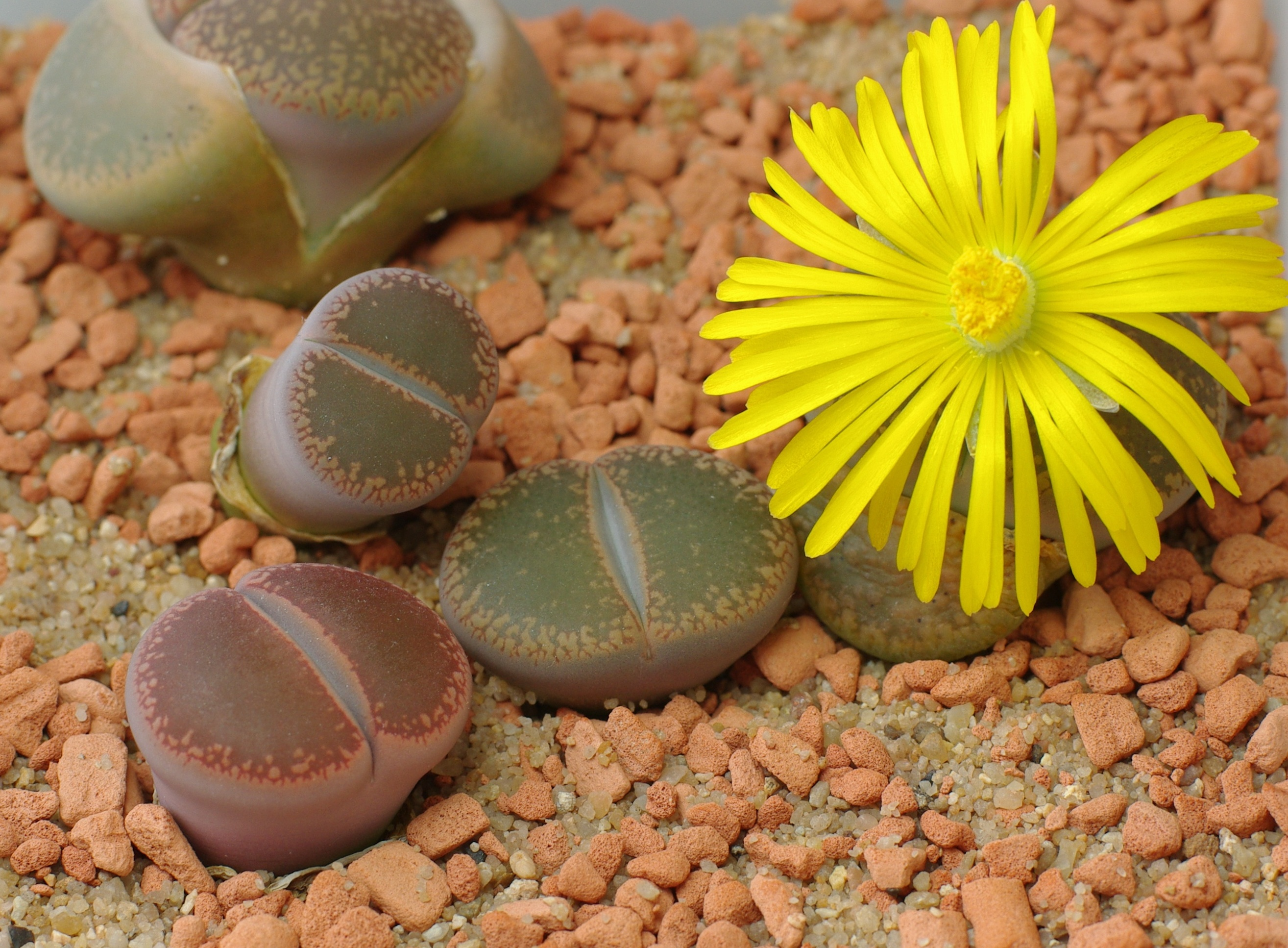
Lithops

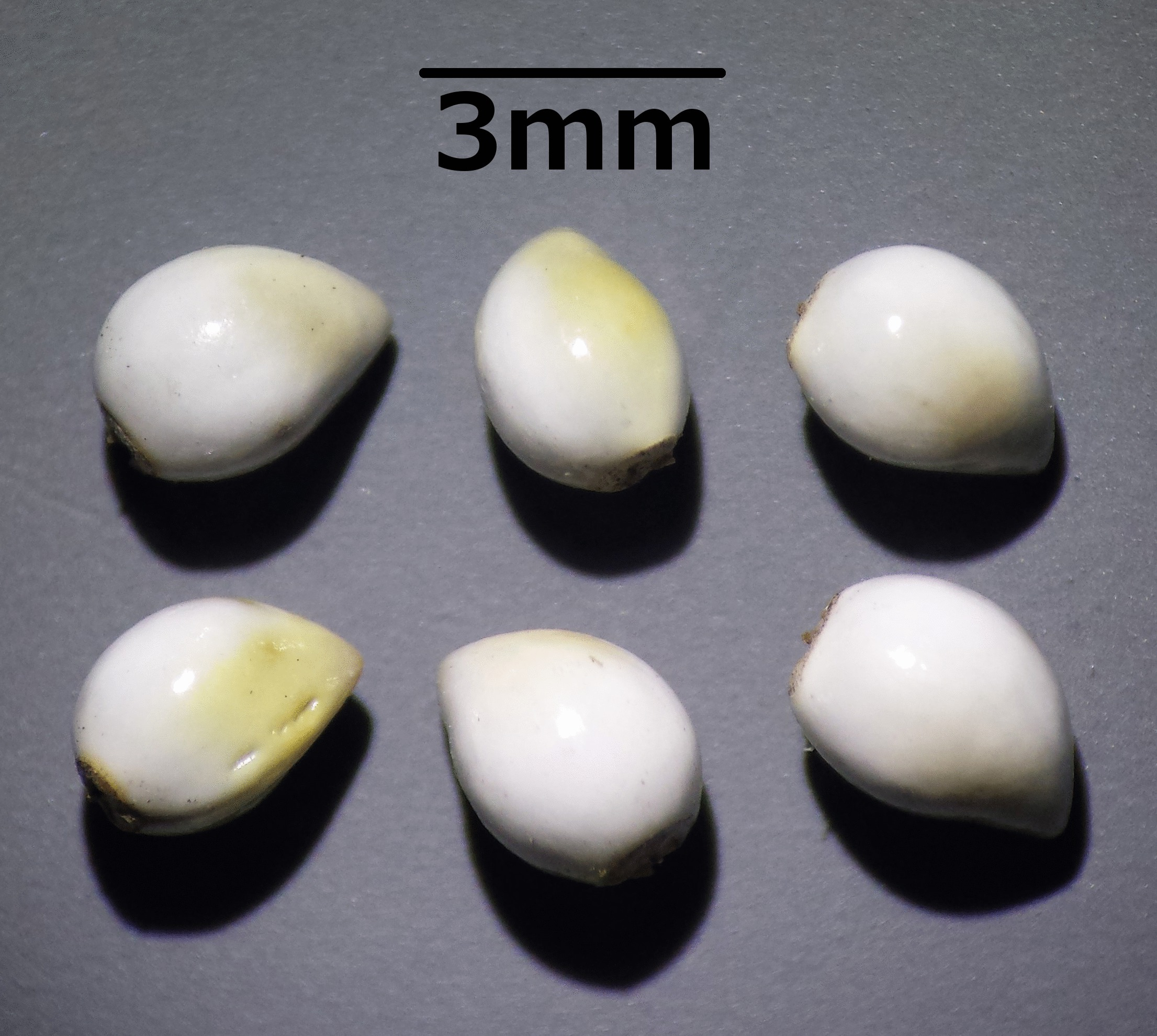
Lithospermum seeds

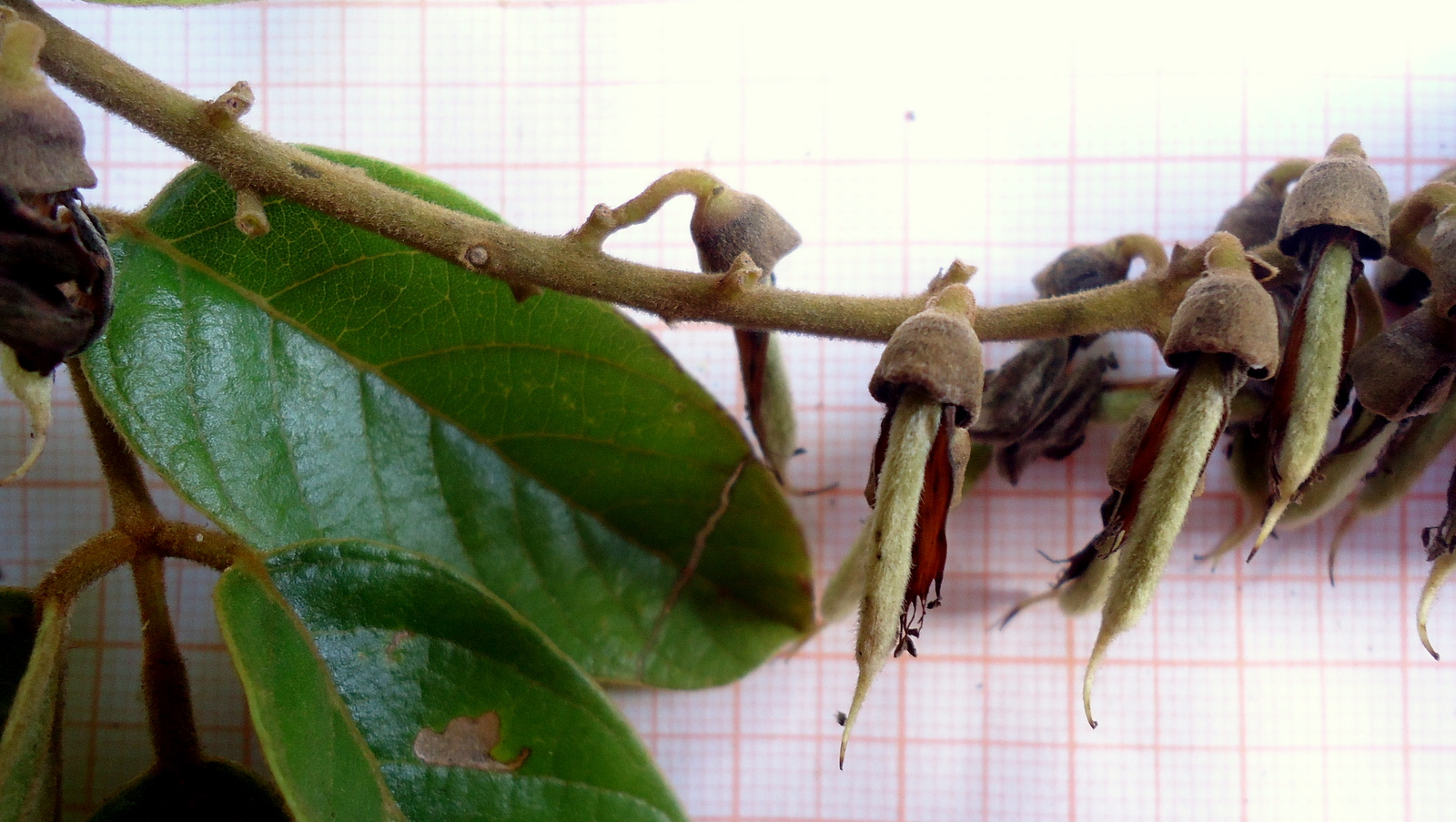
Lonchocarpus

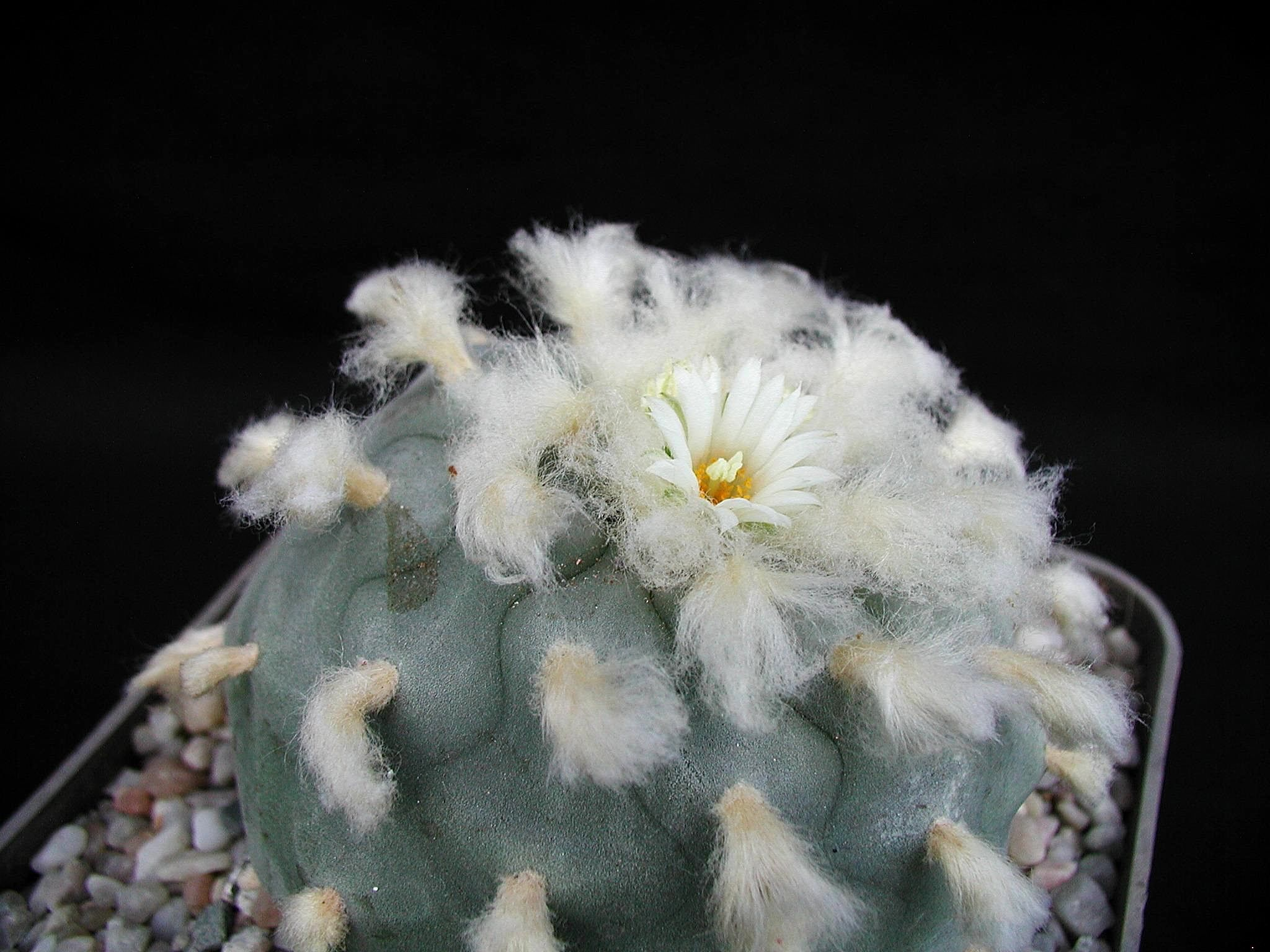
Lophophora

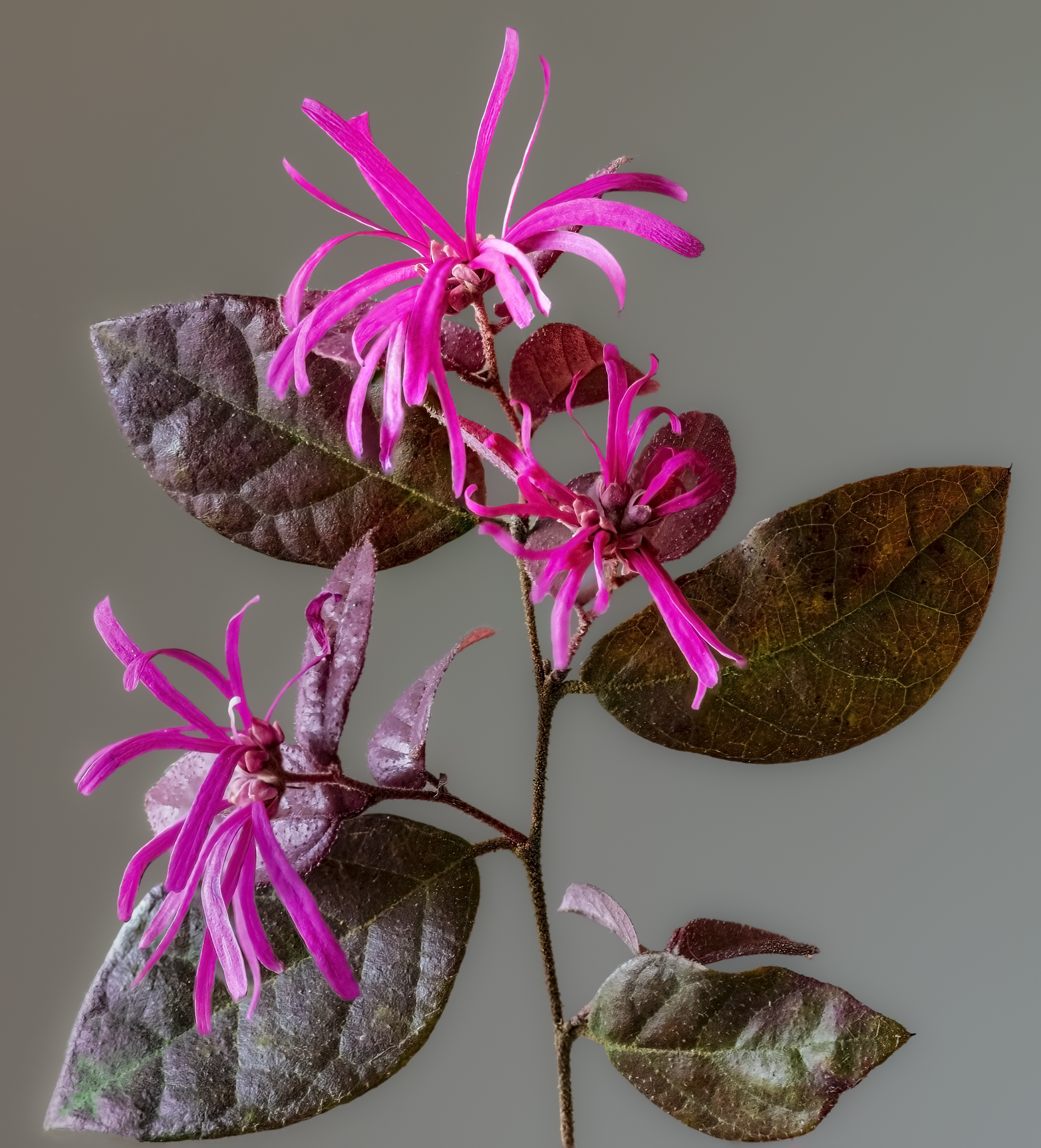
Loropetalum

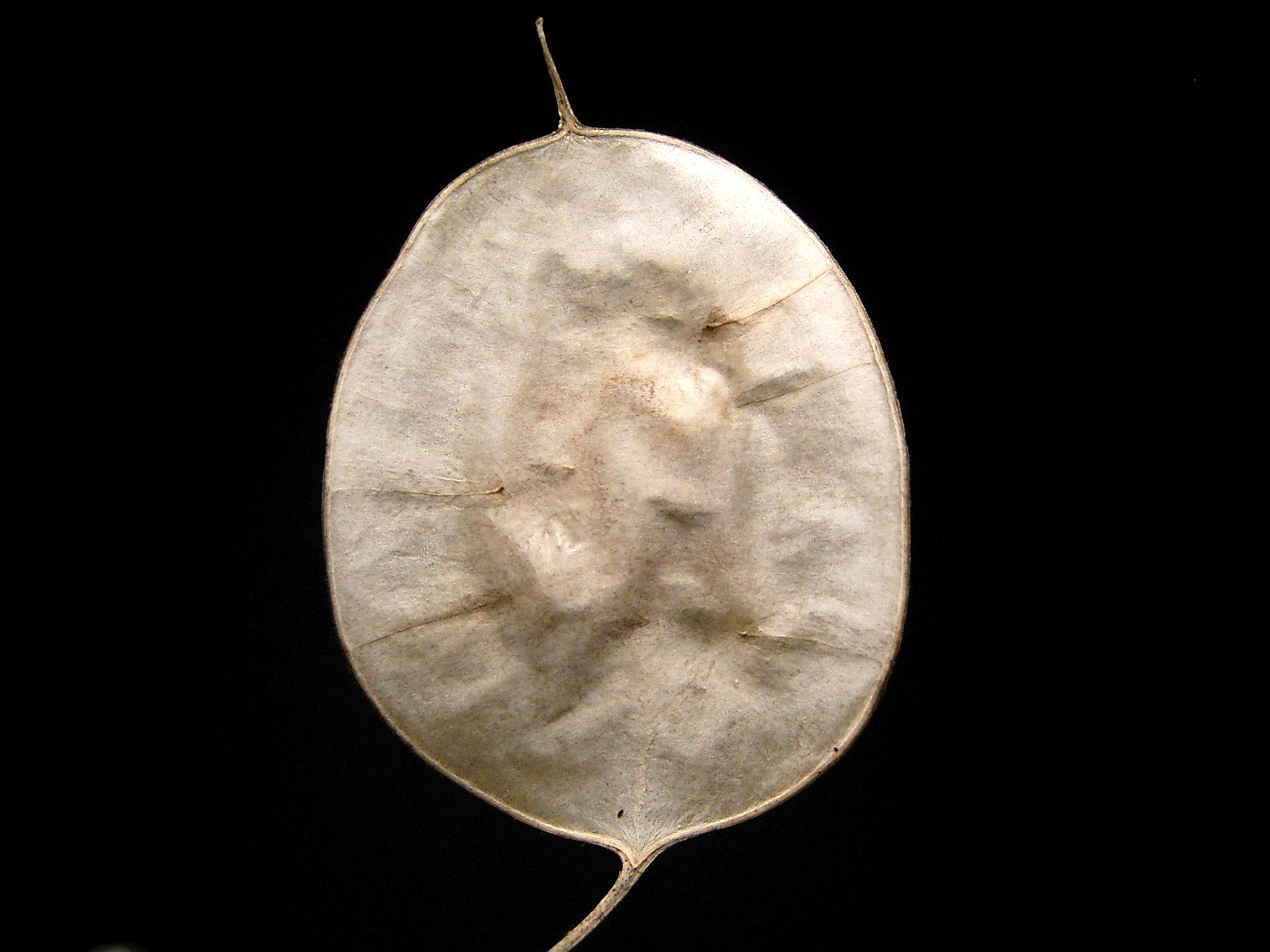
Lunaria

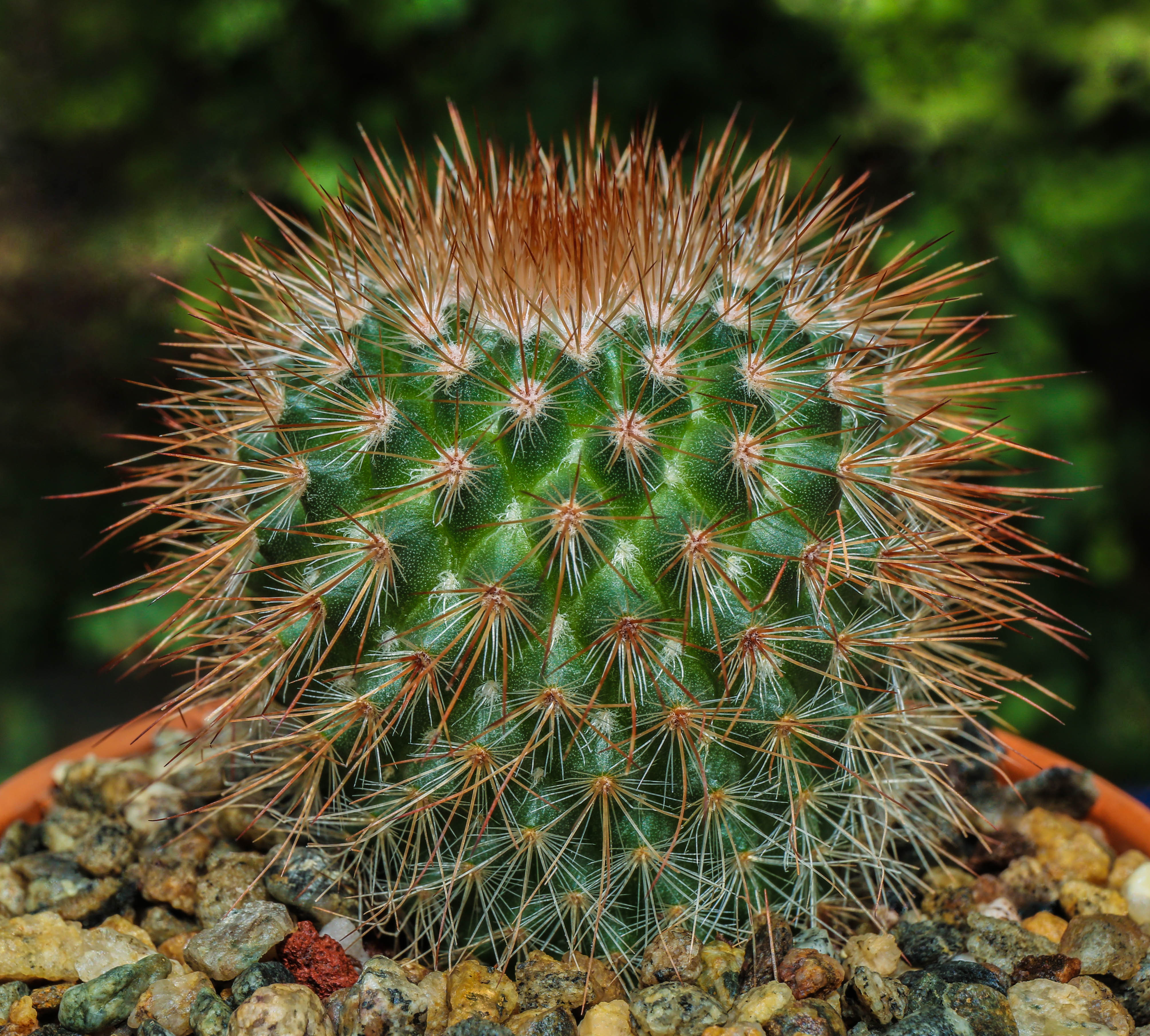
Mammillaria

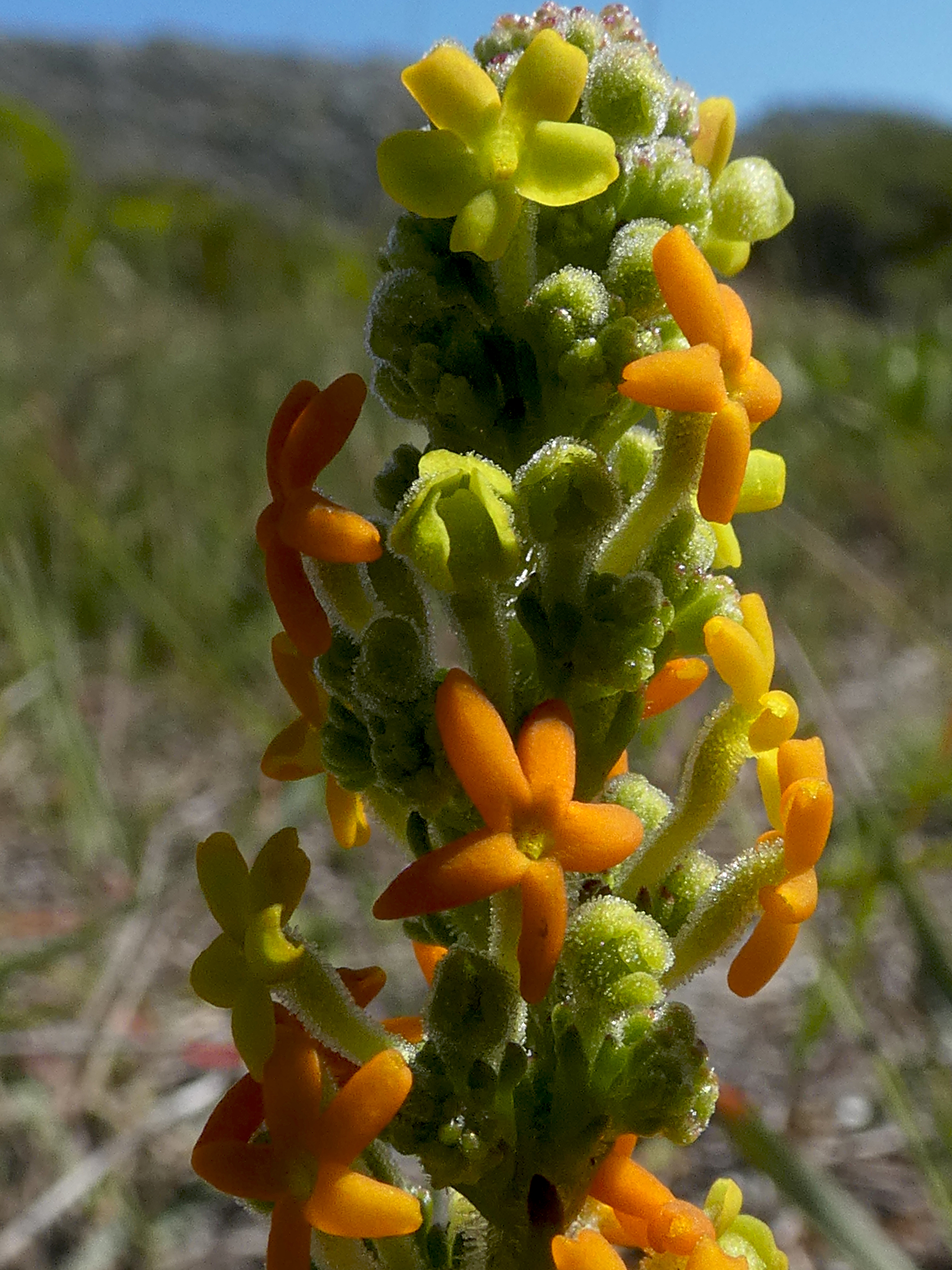
Manulea

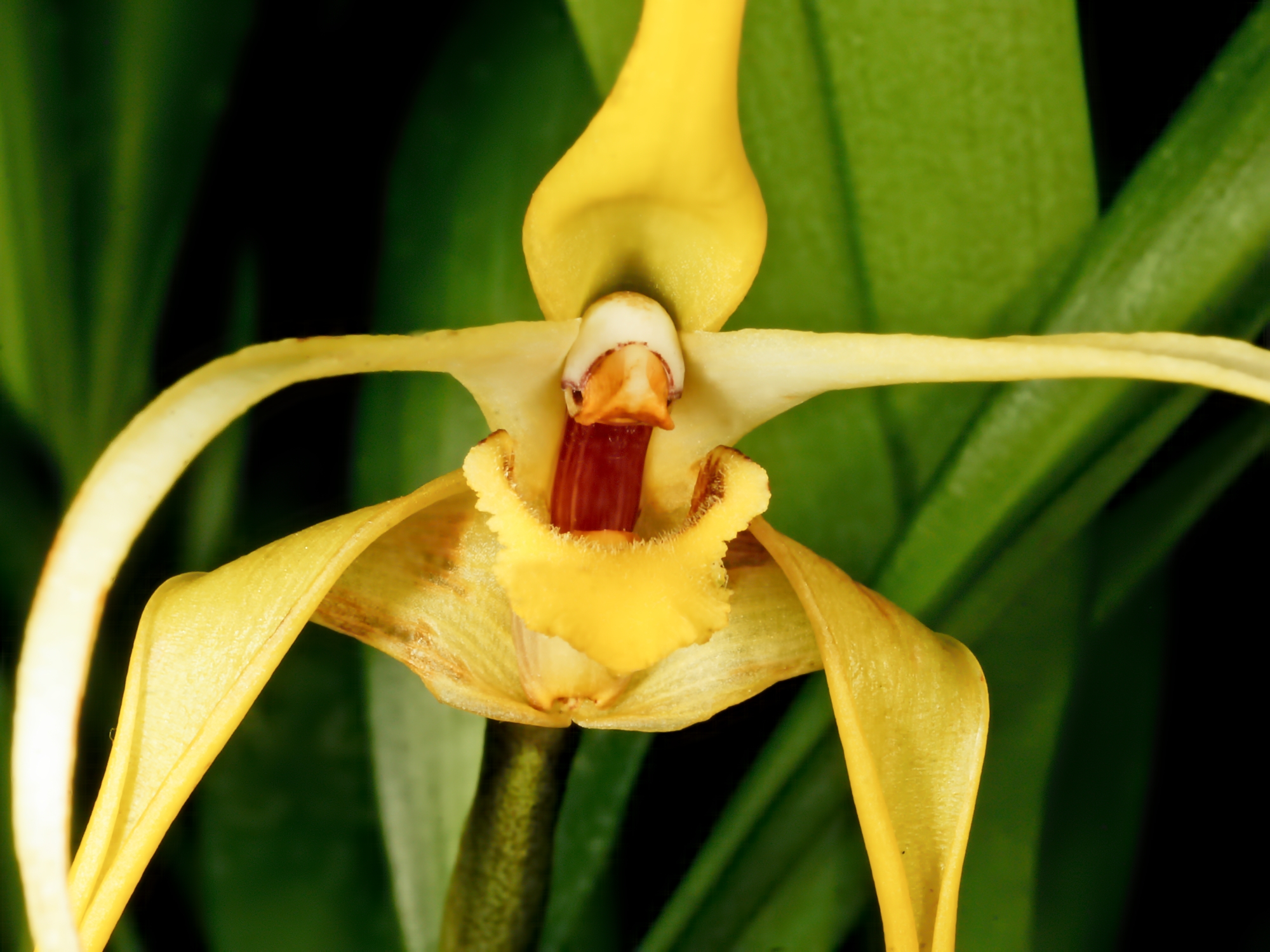
Maxillaria

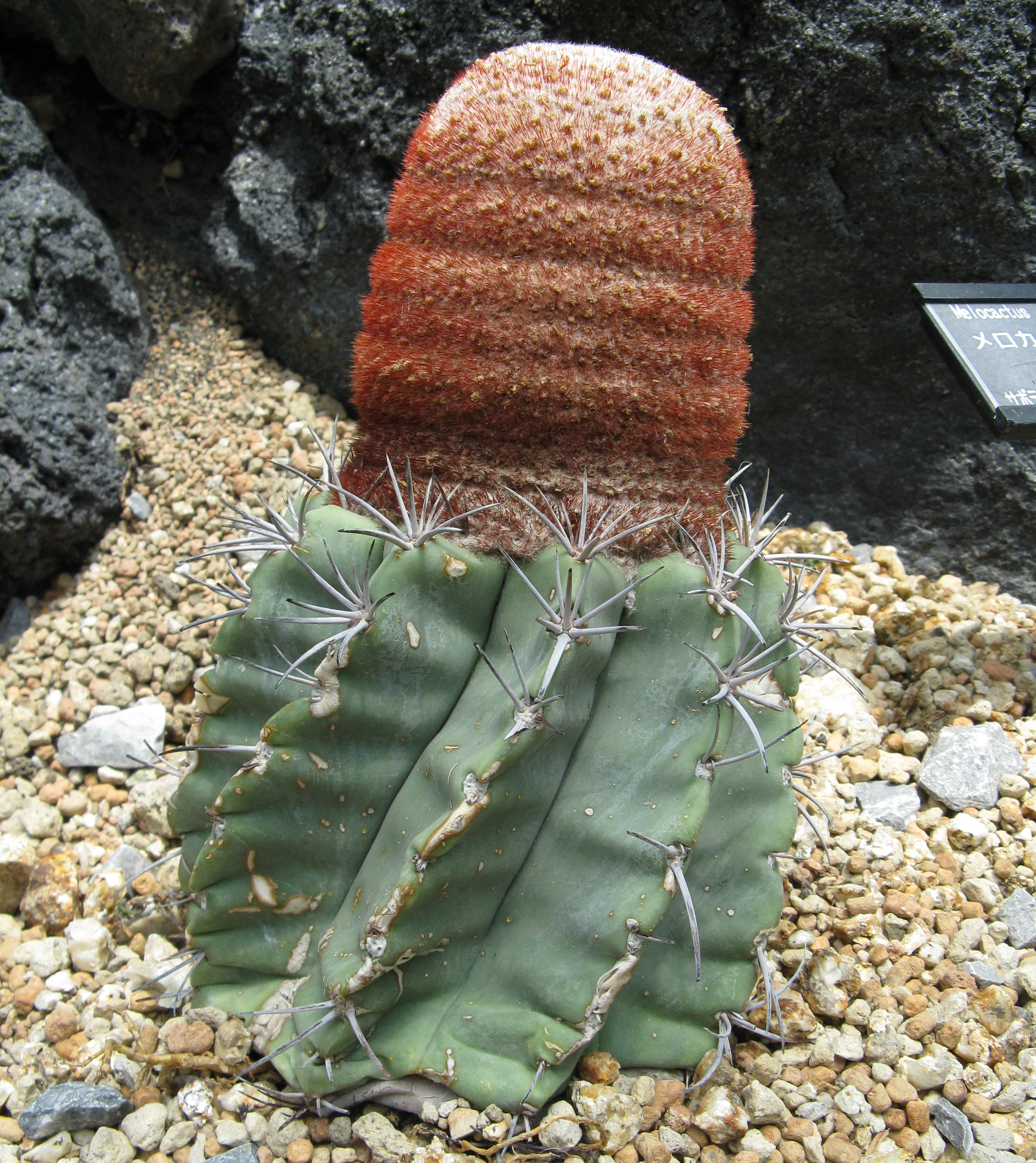
Melocactus

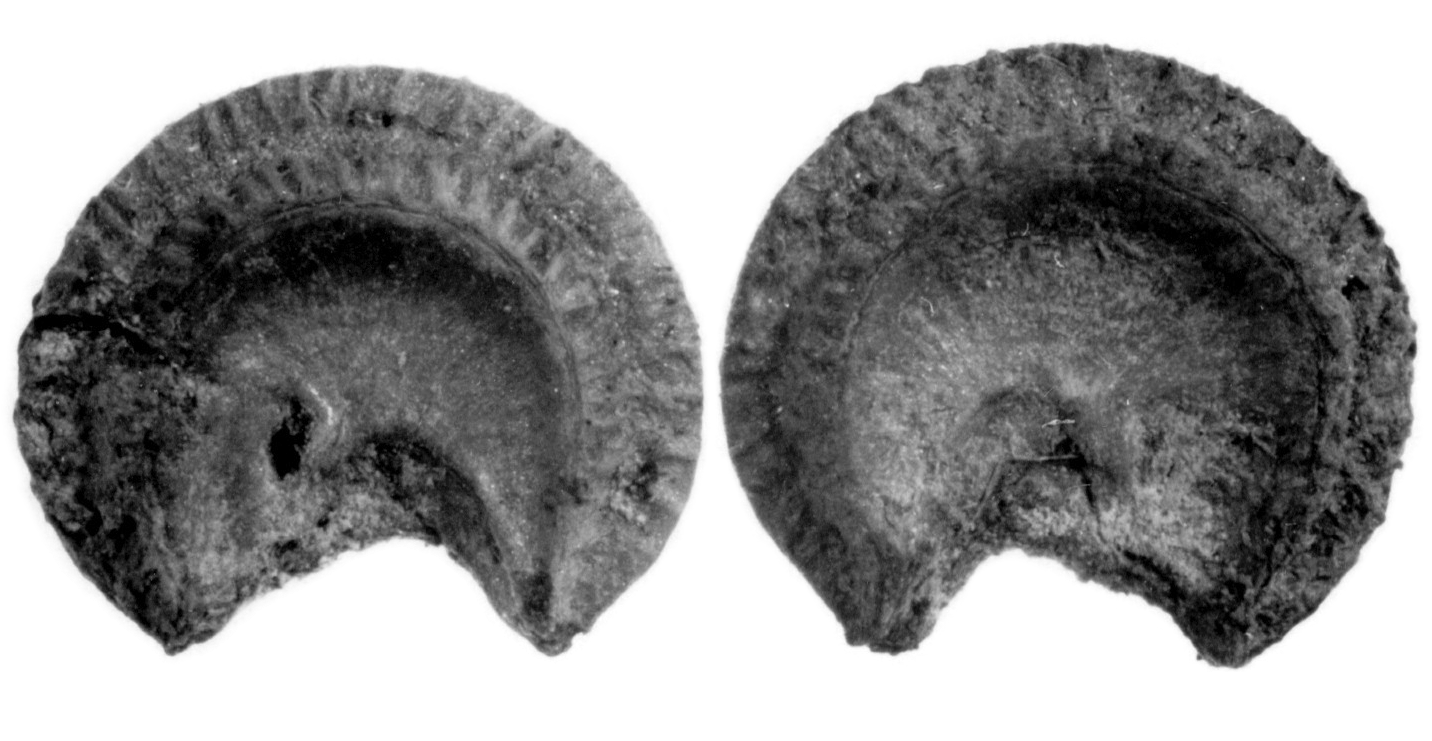
Menispermum seeds

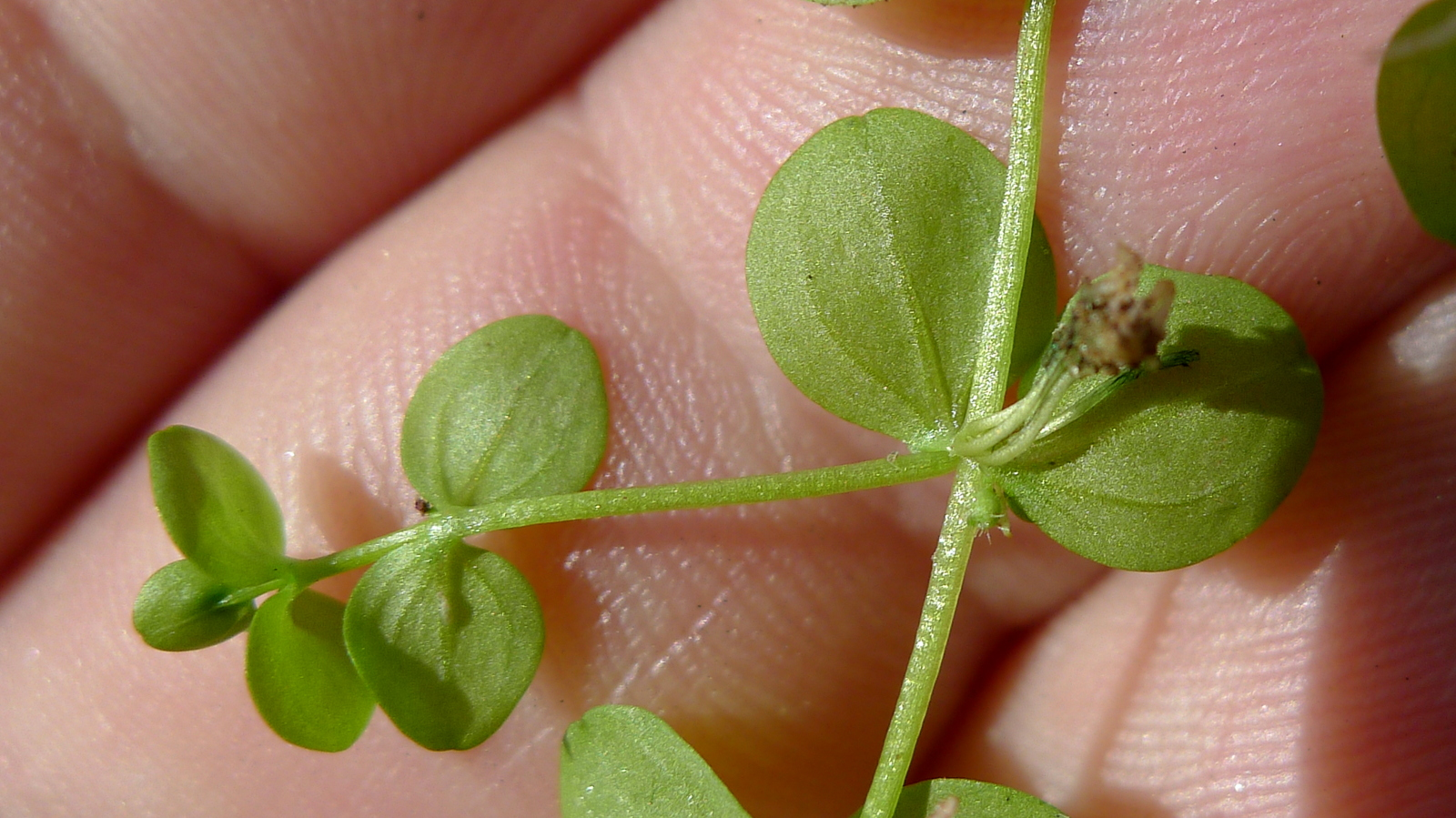
Micranthemum

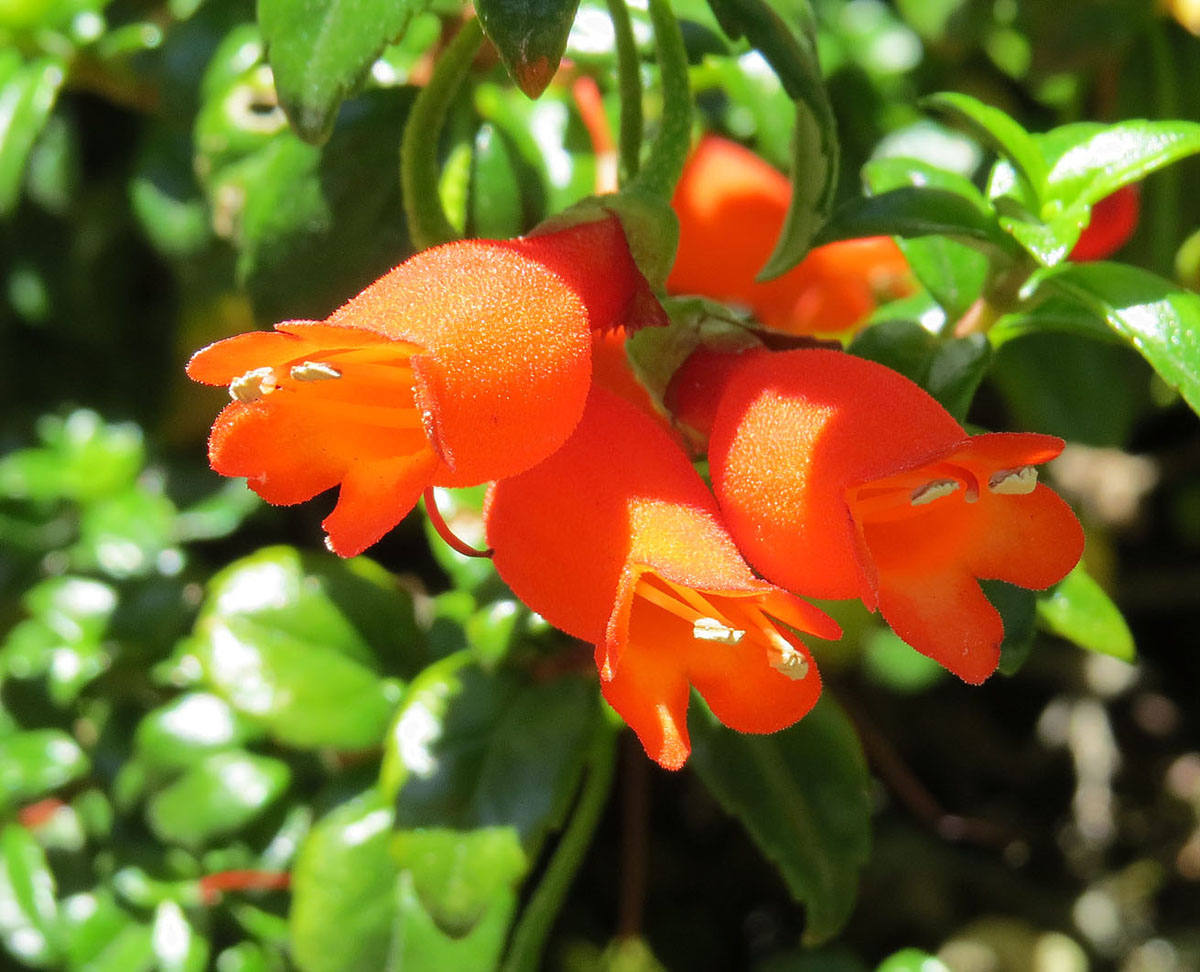
Mitraria

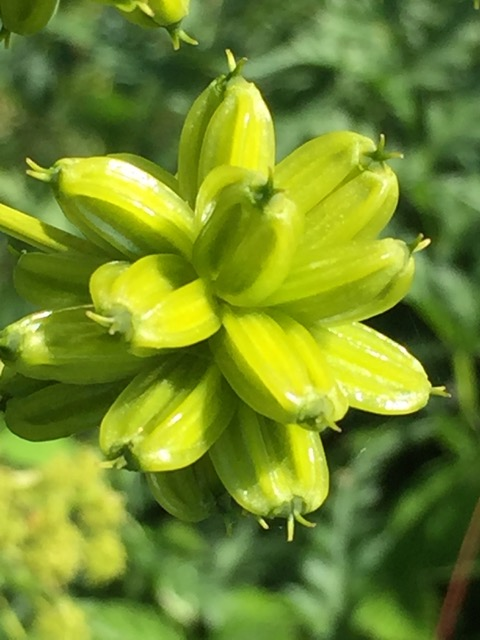
Molopospermum

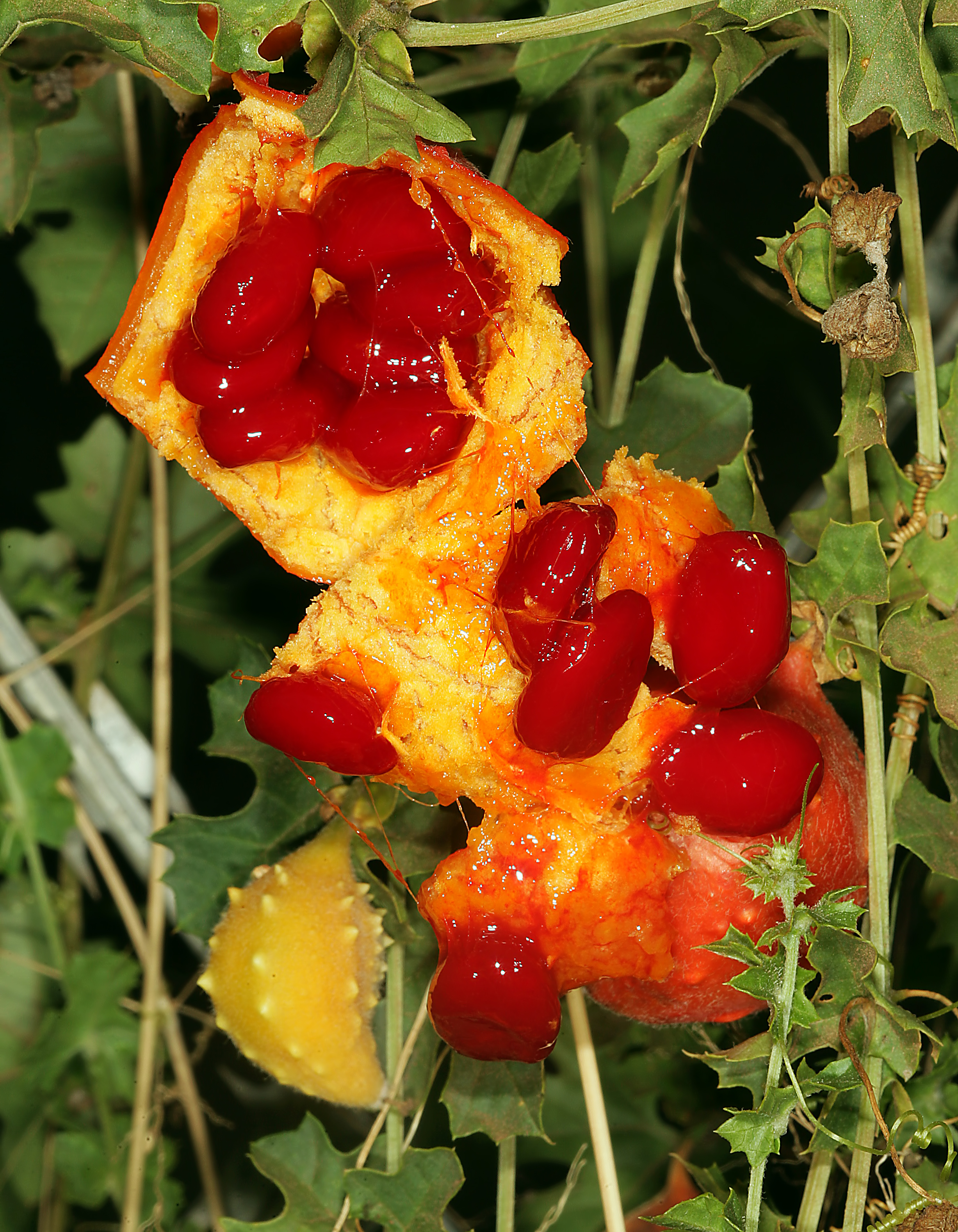
Momordica

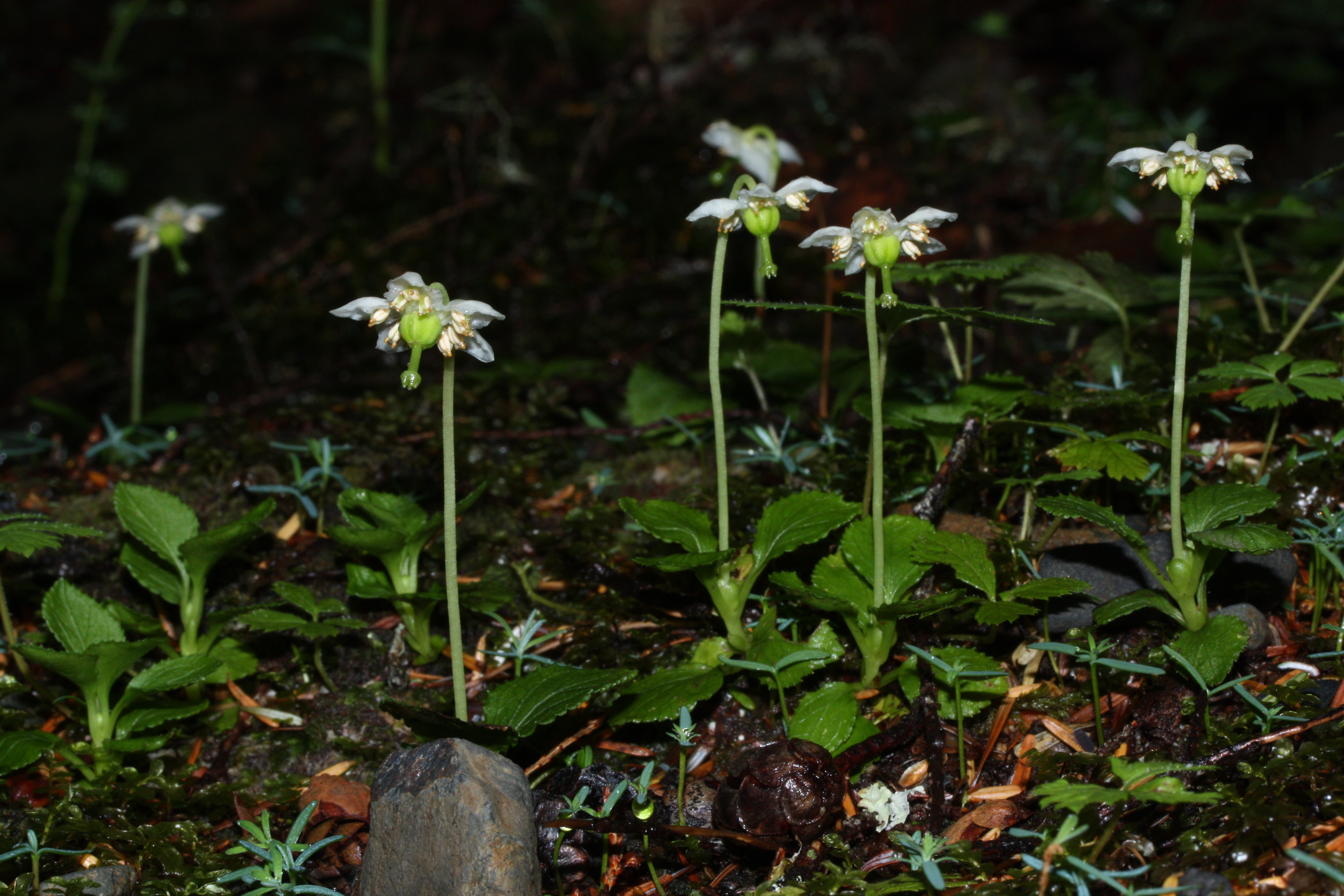
Moneses

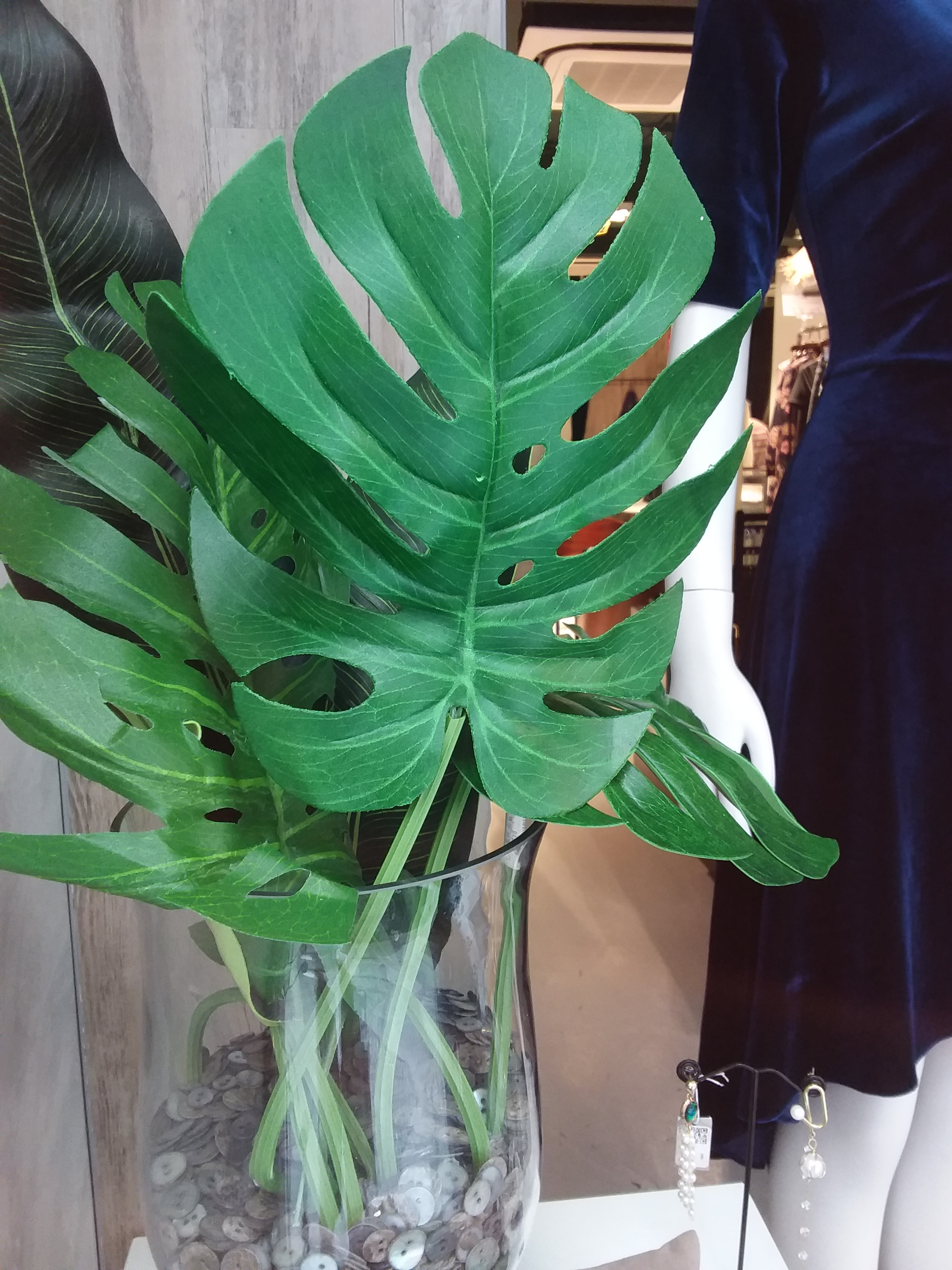
Monstera in a clothing shop window

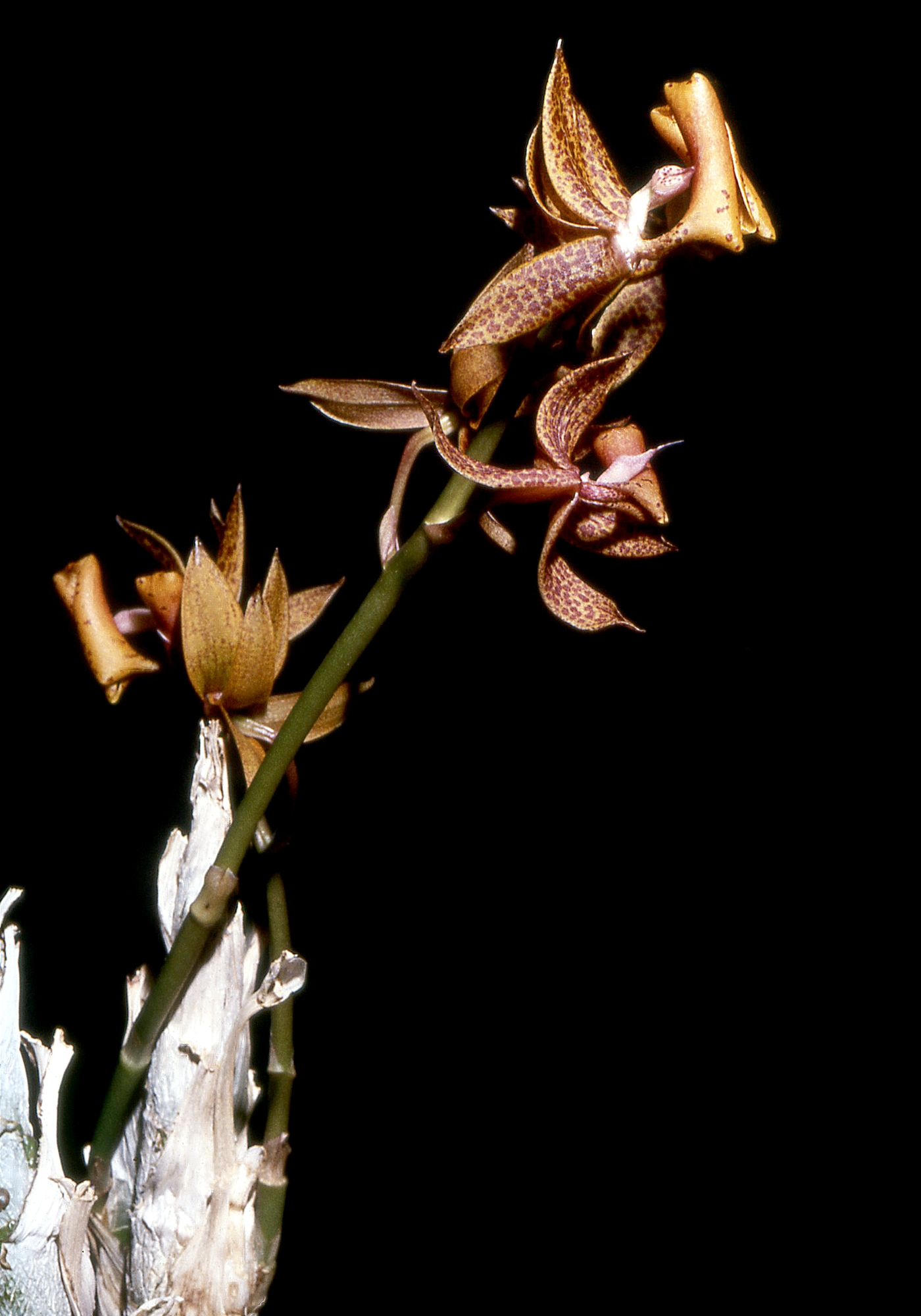
Mormodes

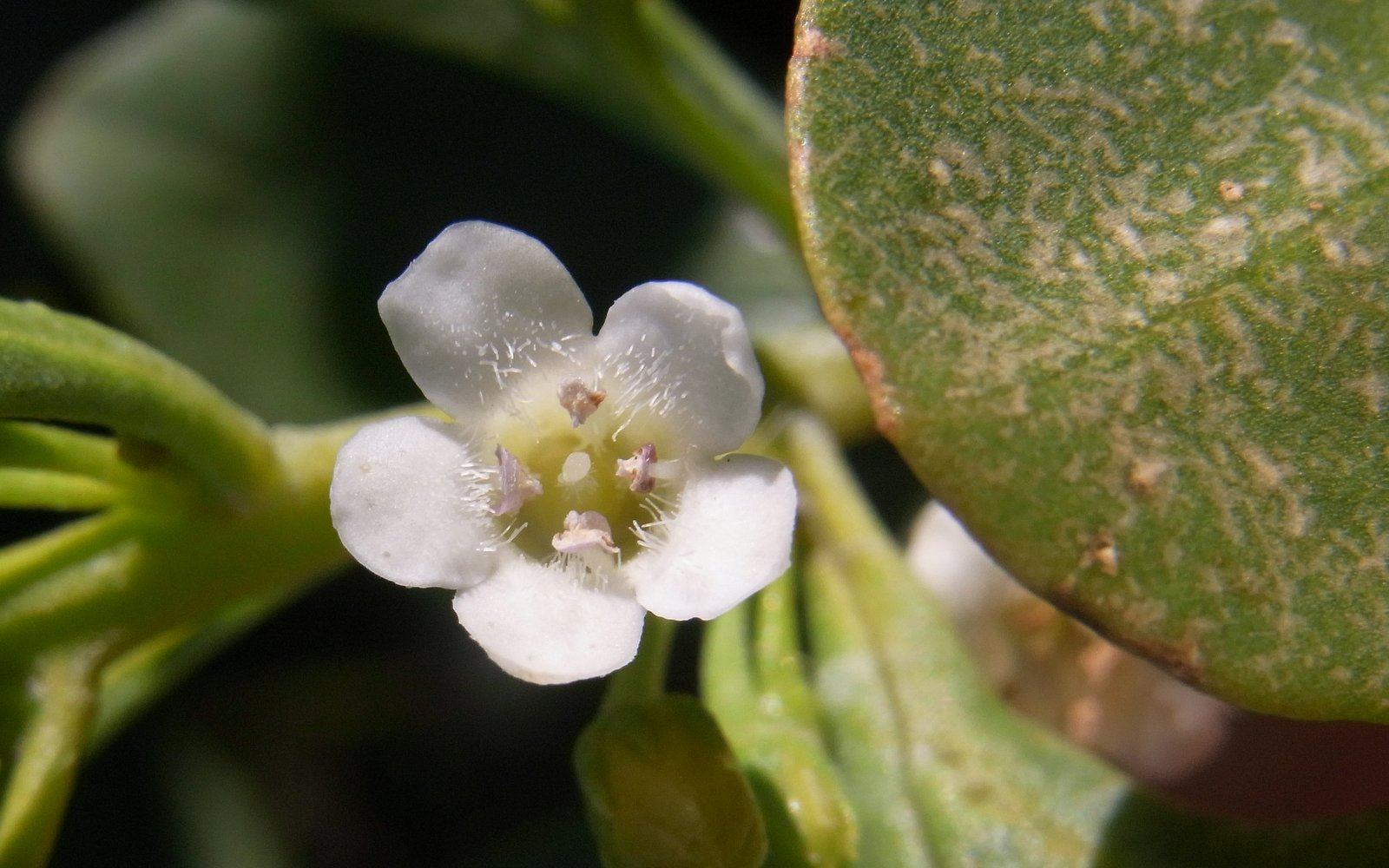
Myoporum

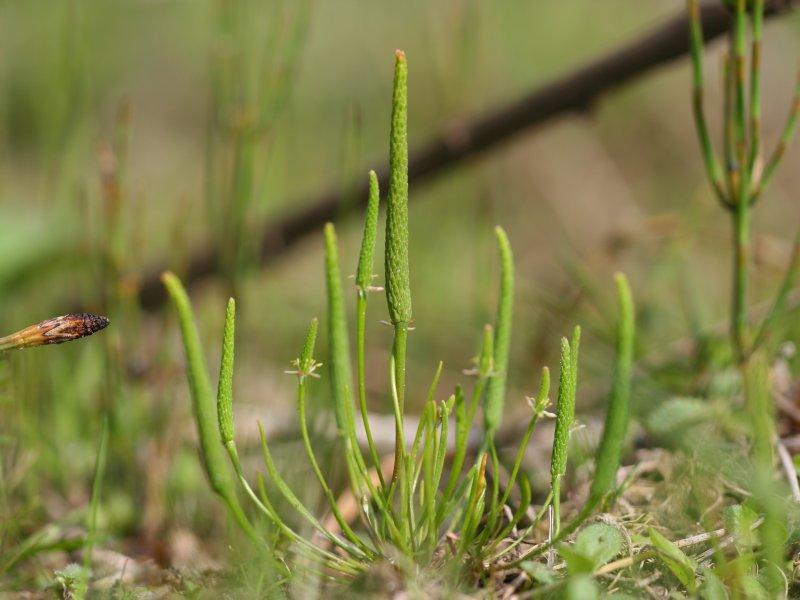
Myosurus

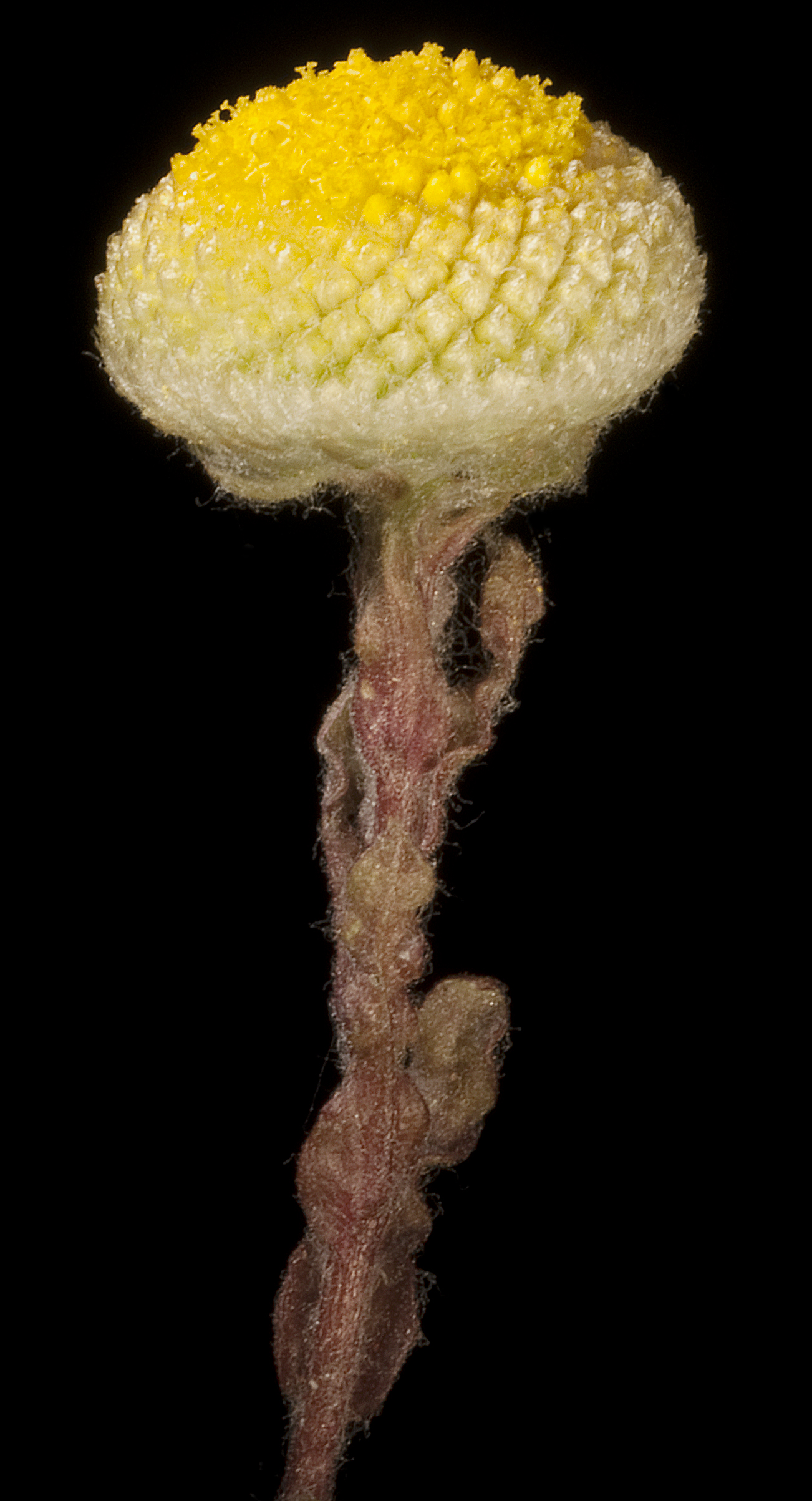
Myriocephalus

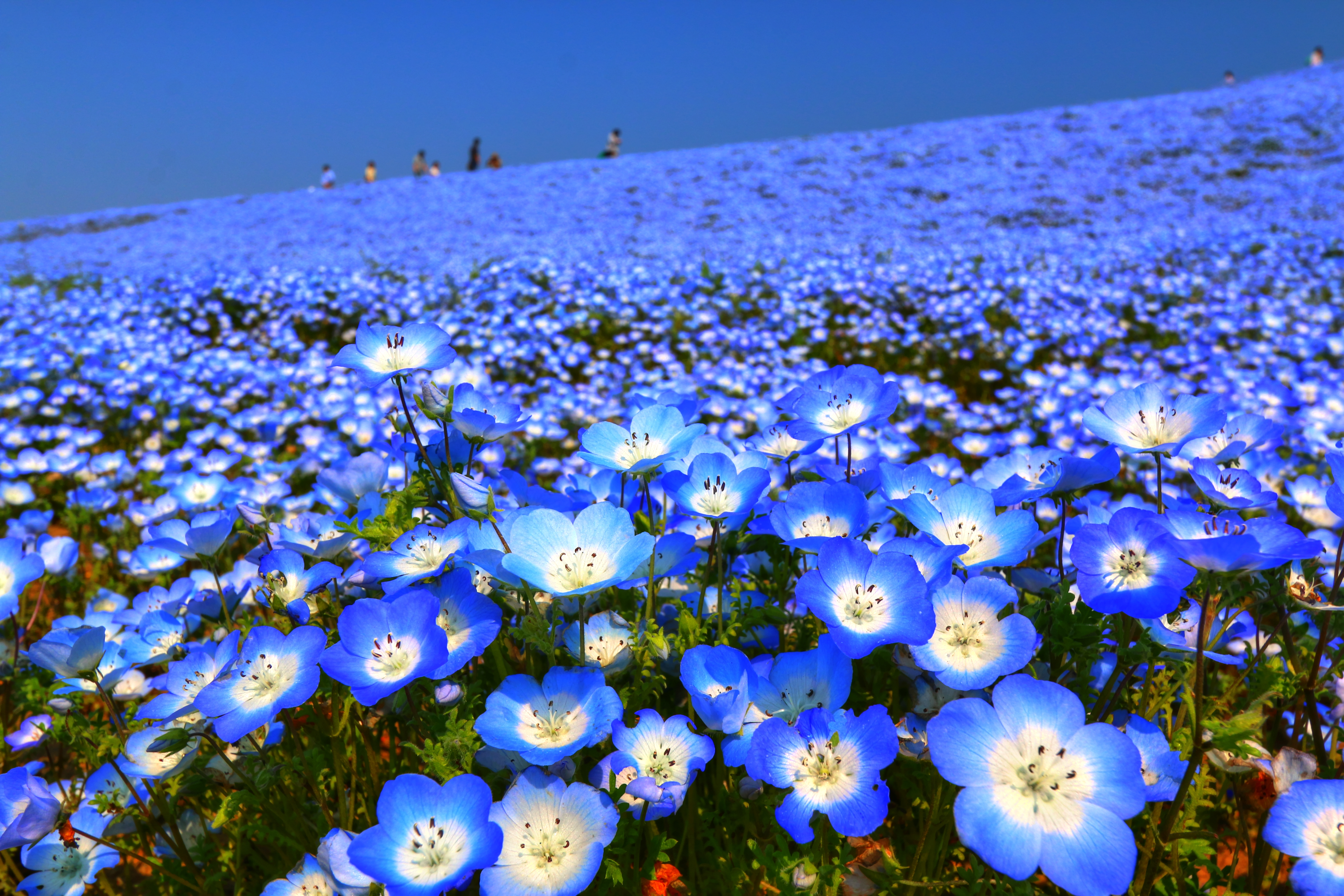
Nemophila

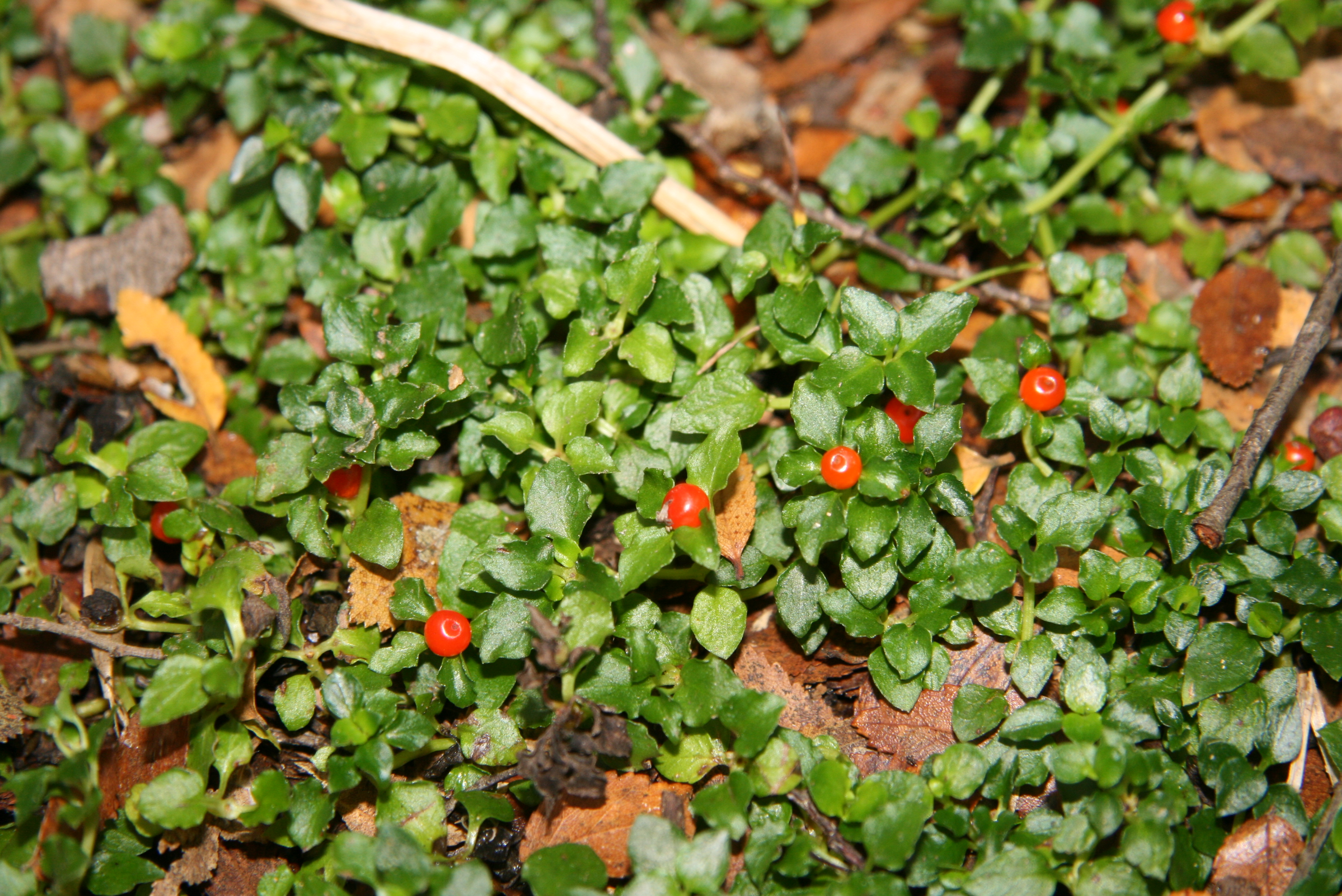
Nertera

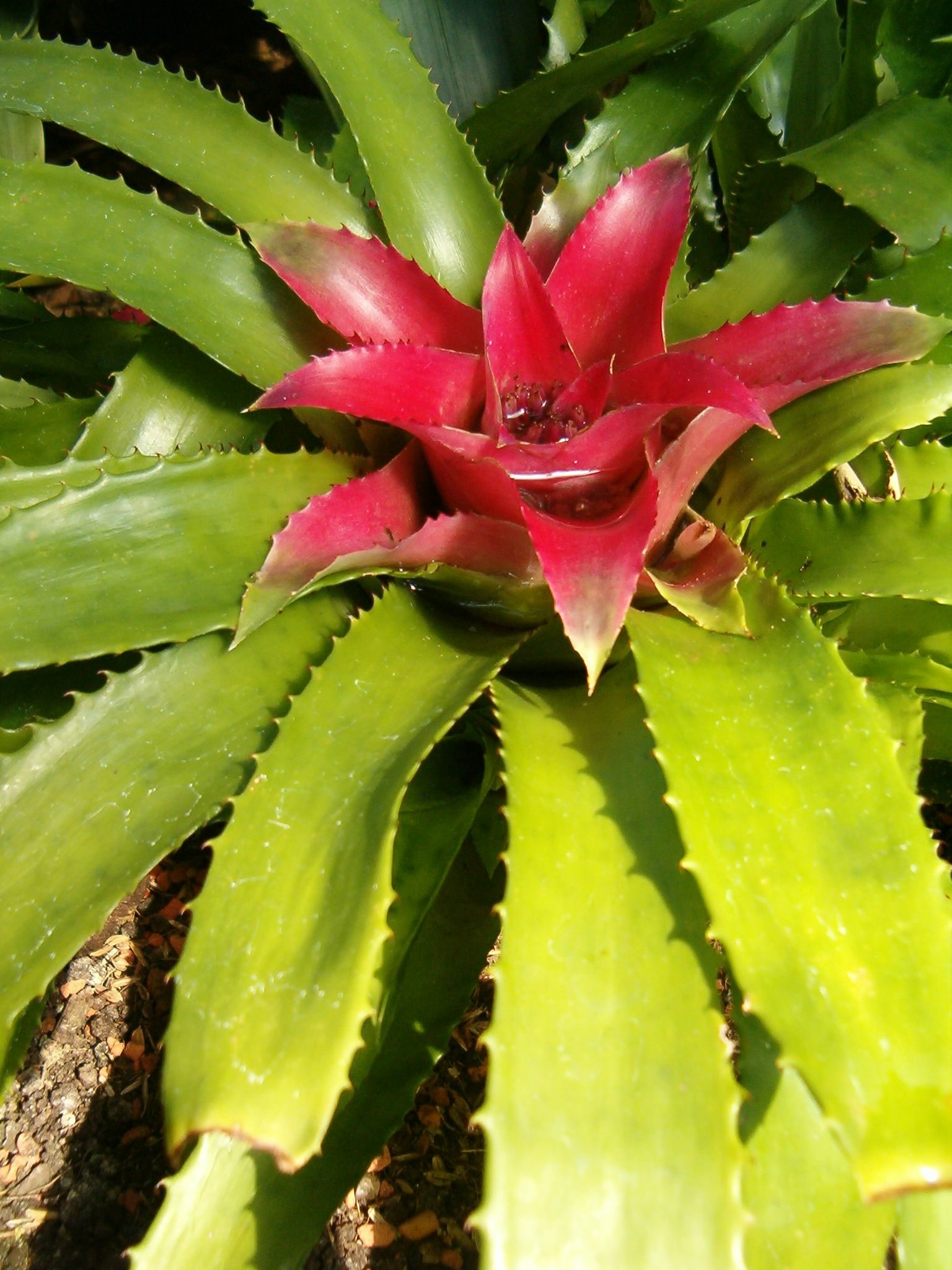
Nidularium

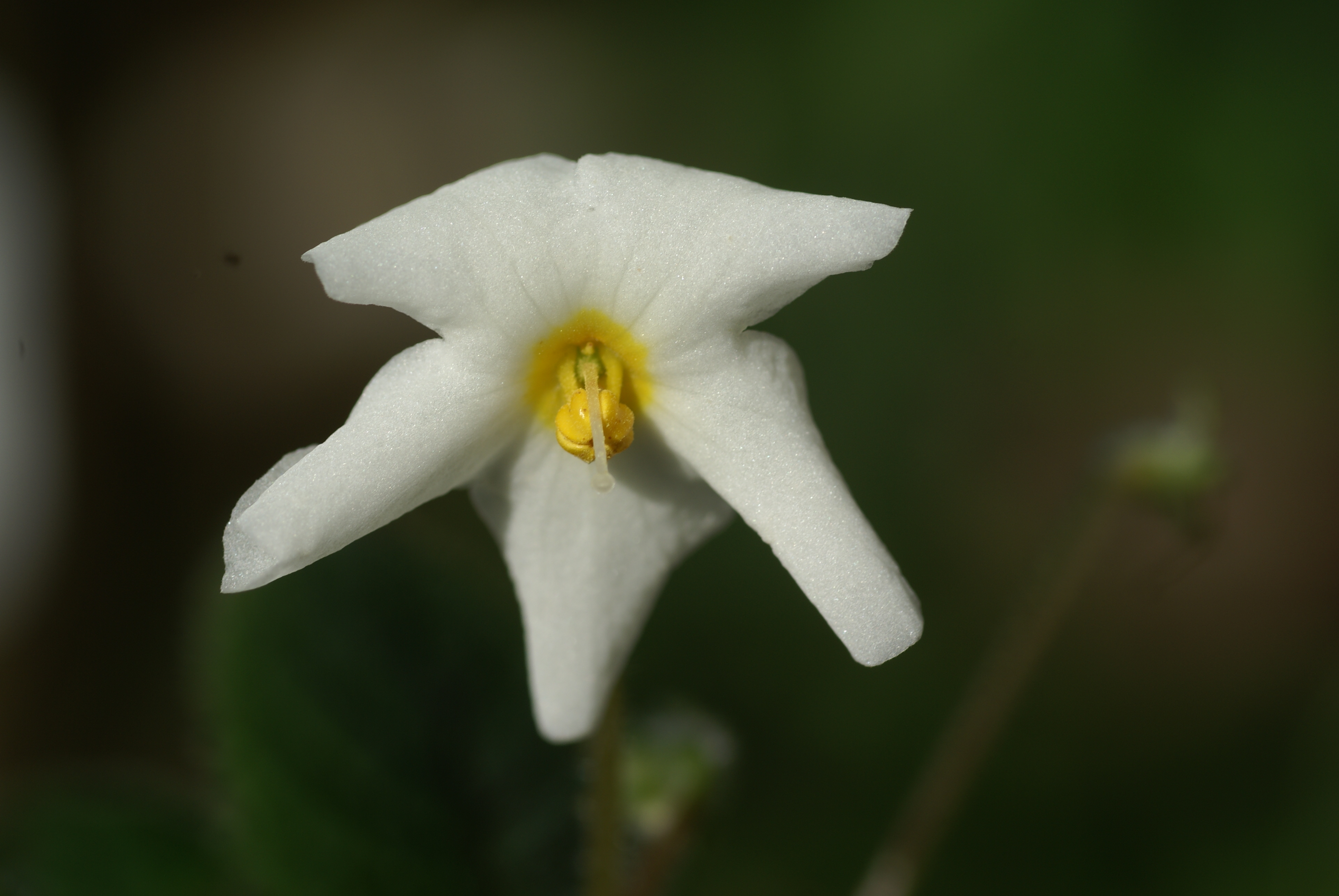
Niphaea

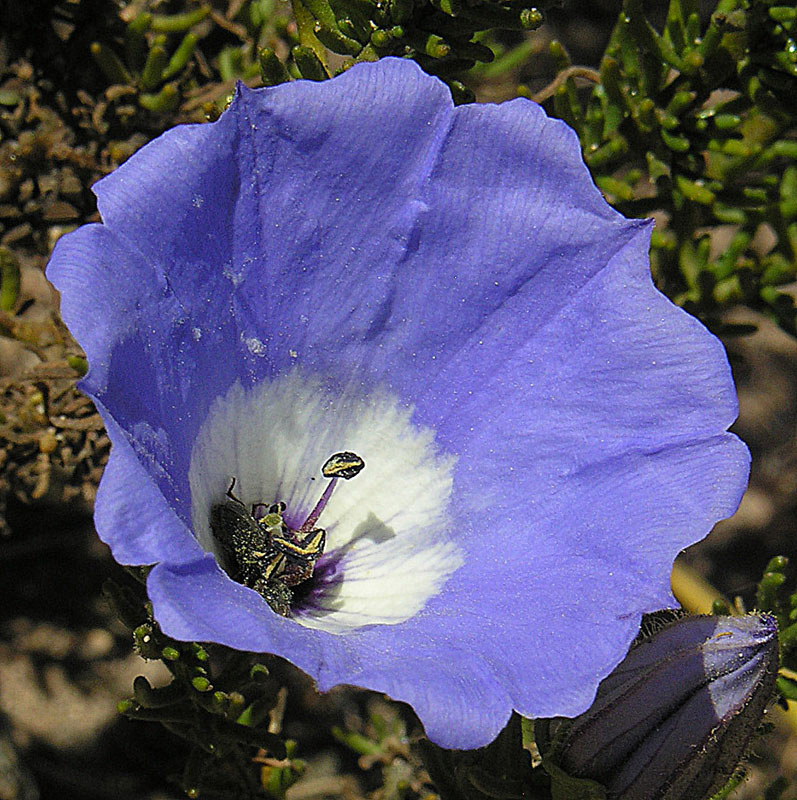
Nolana

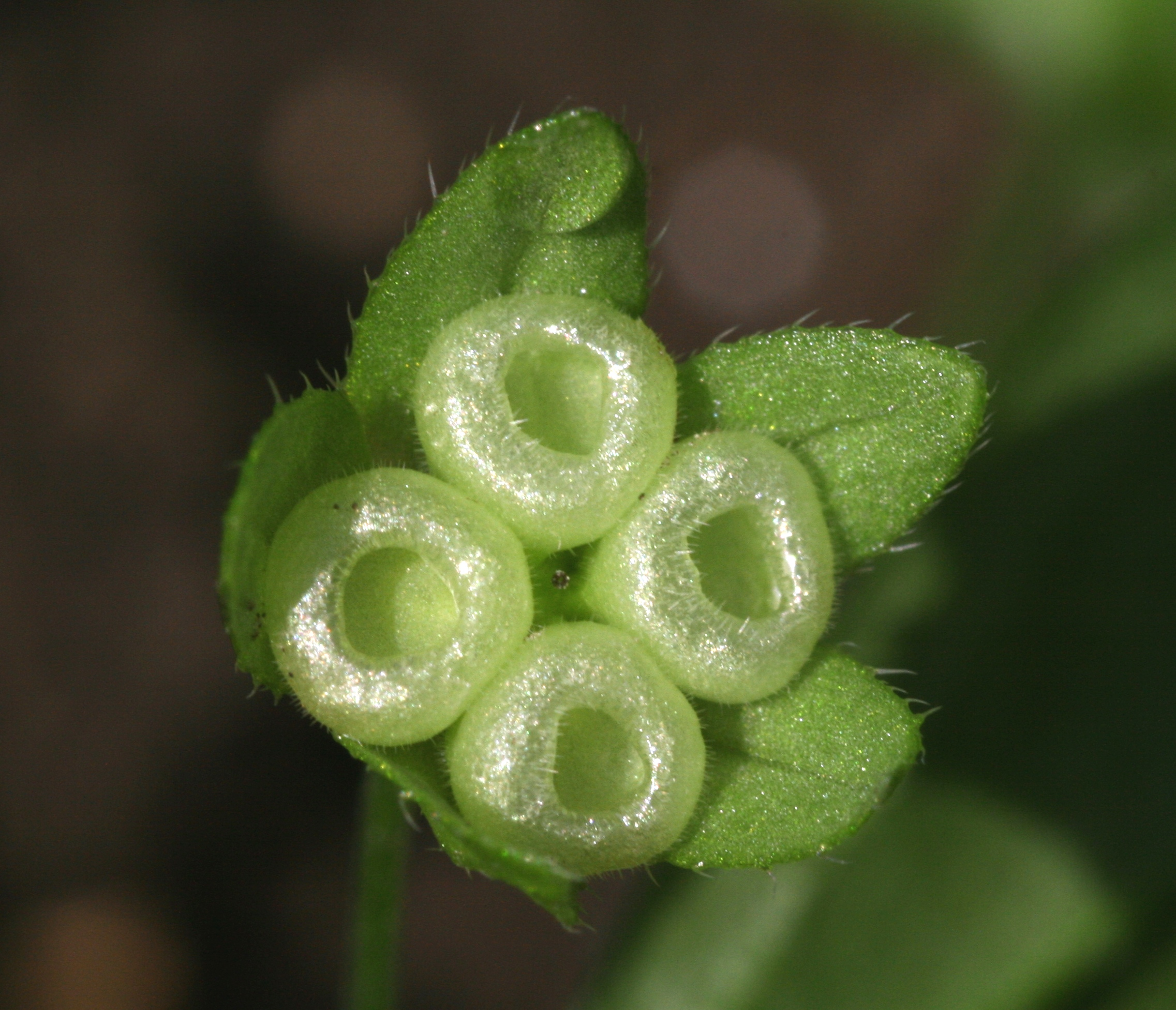
Omphalodes

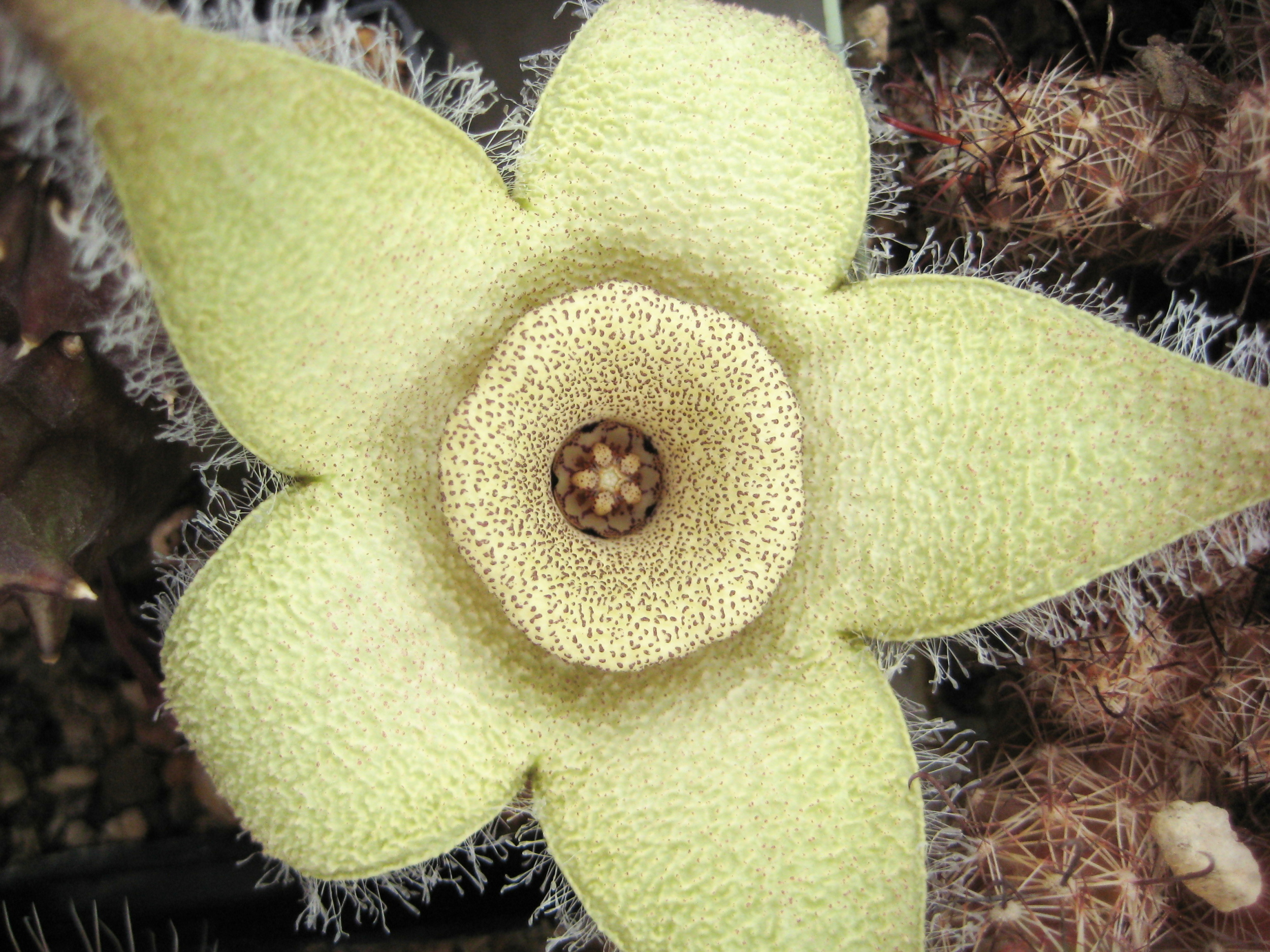
Orbea

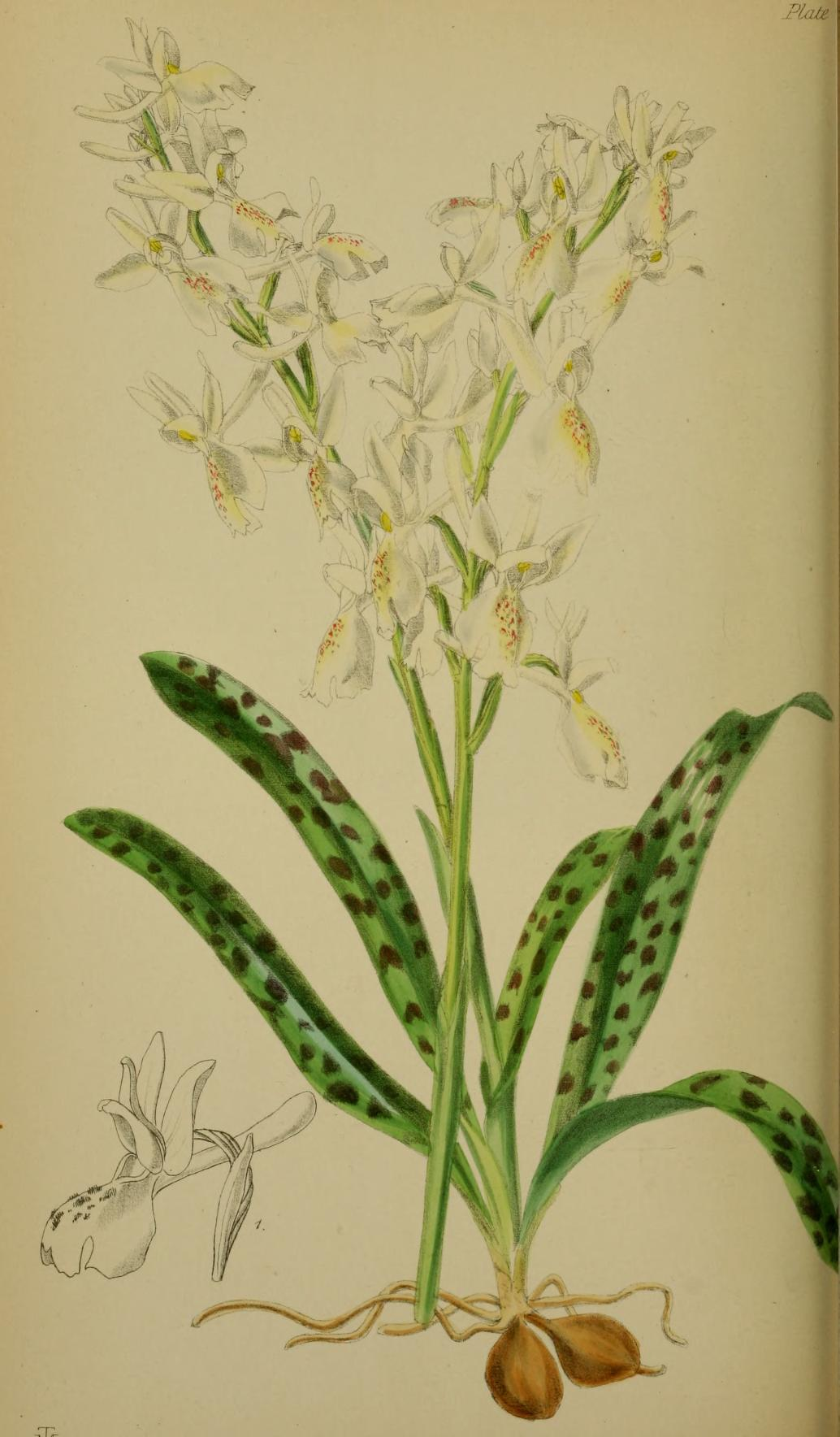
Illustration of Orchis

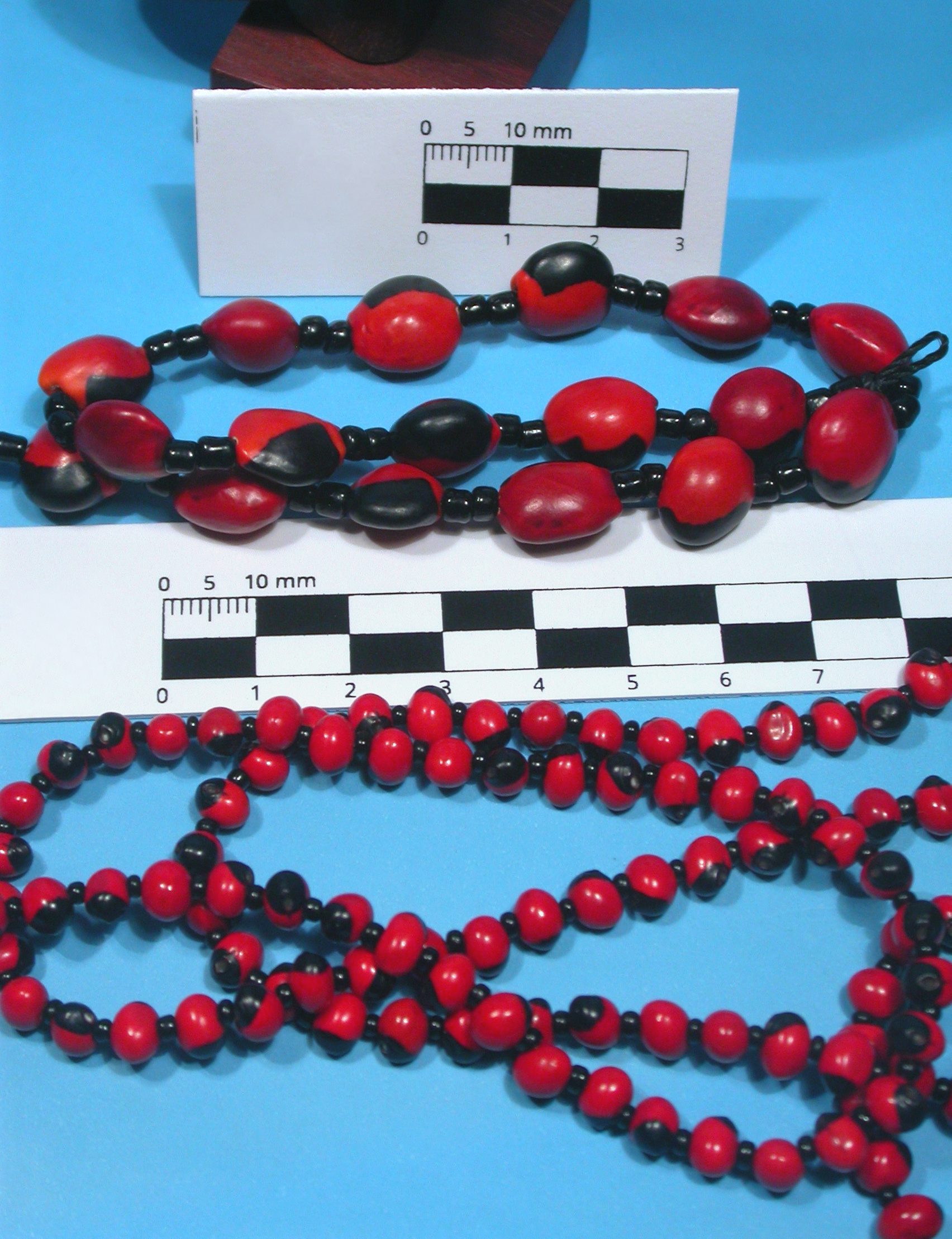
Ormosia-seed necklaces

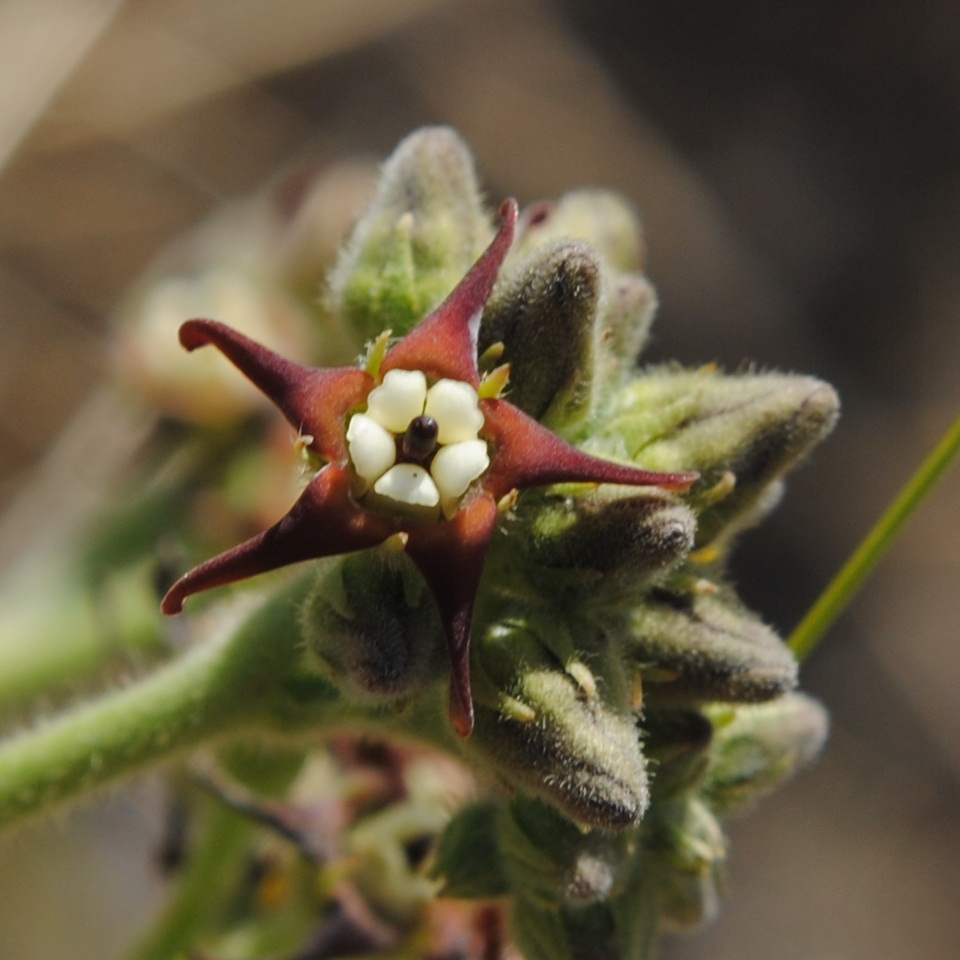
Oxypetalum

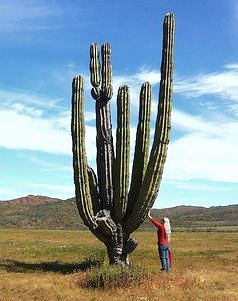
Pachycereus

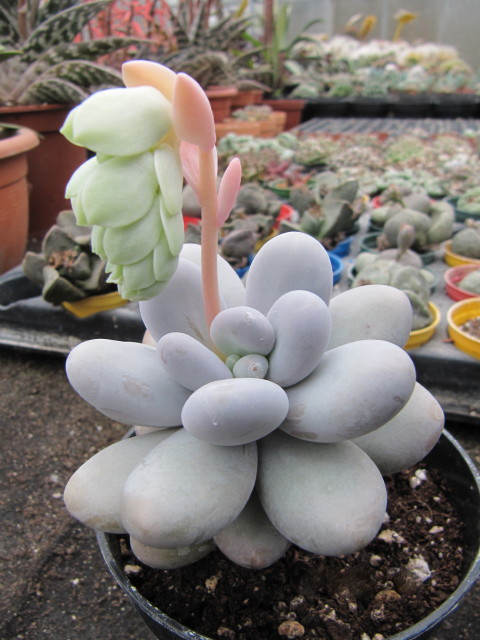
Potted Pachyphytum

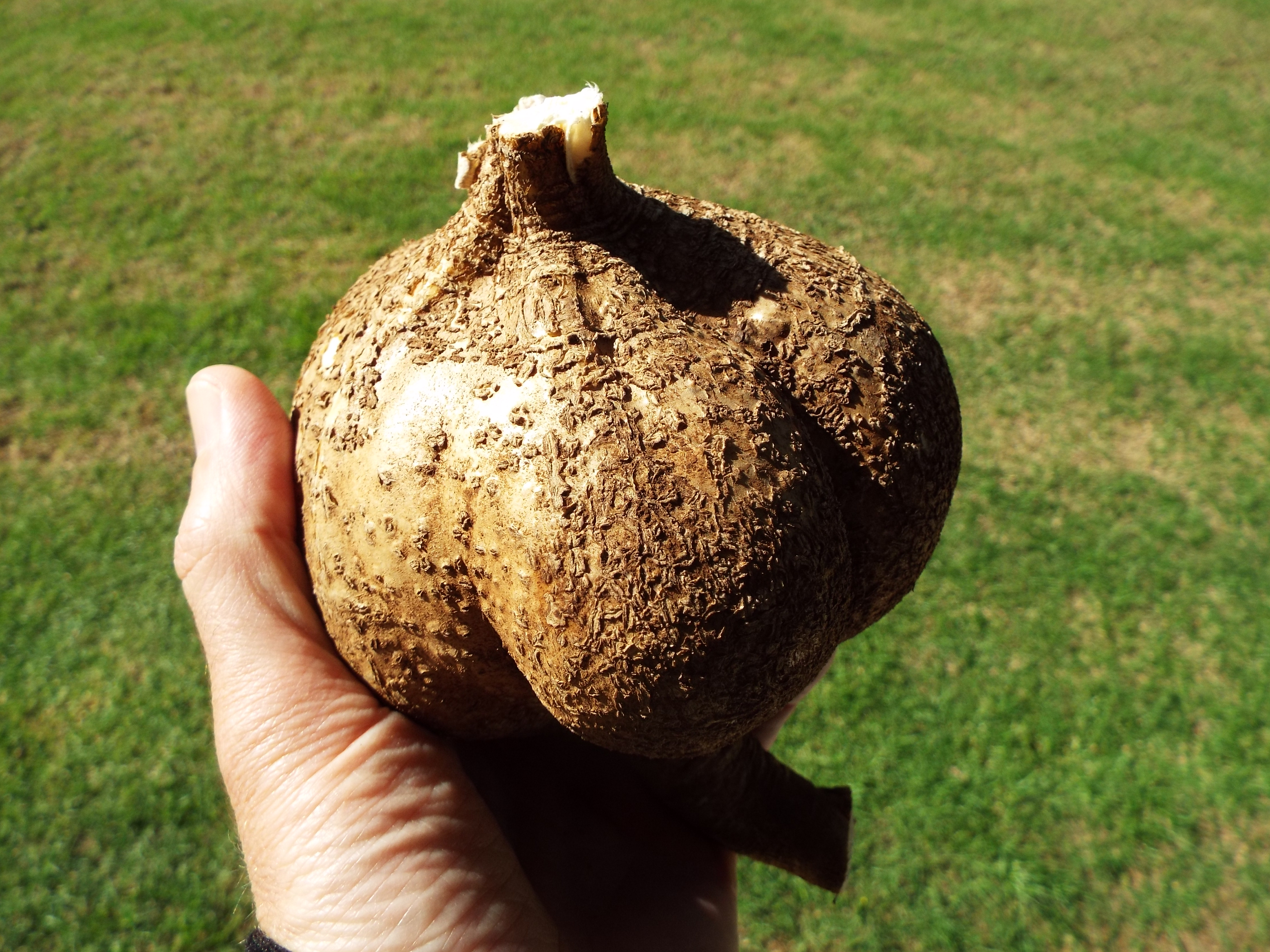
Pachyrhizus root

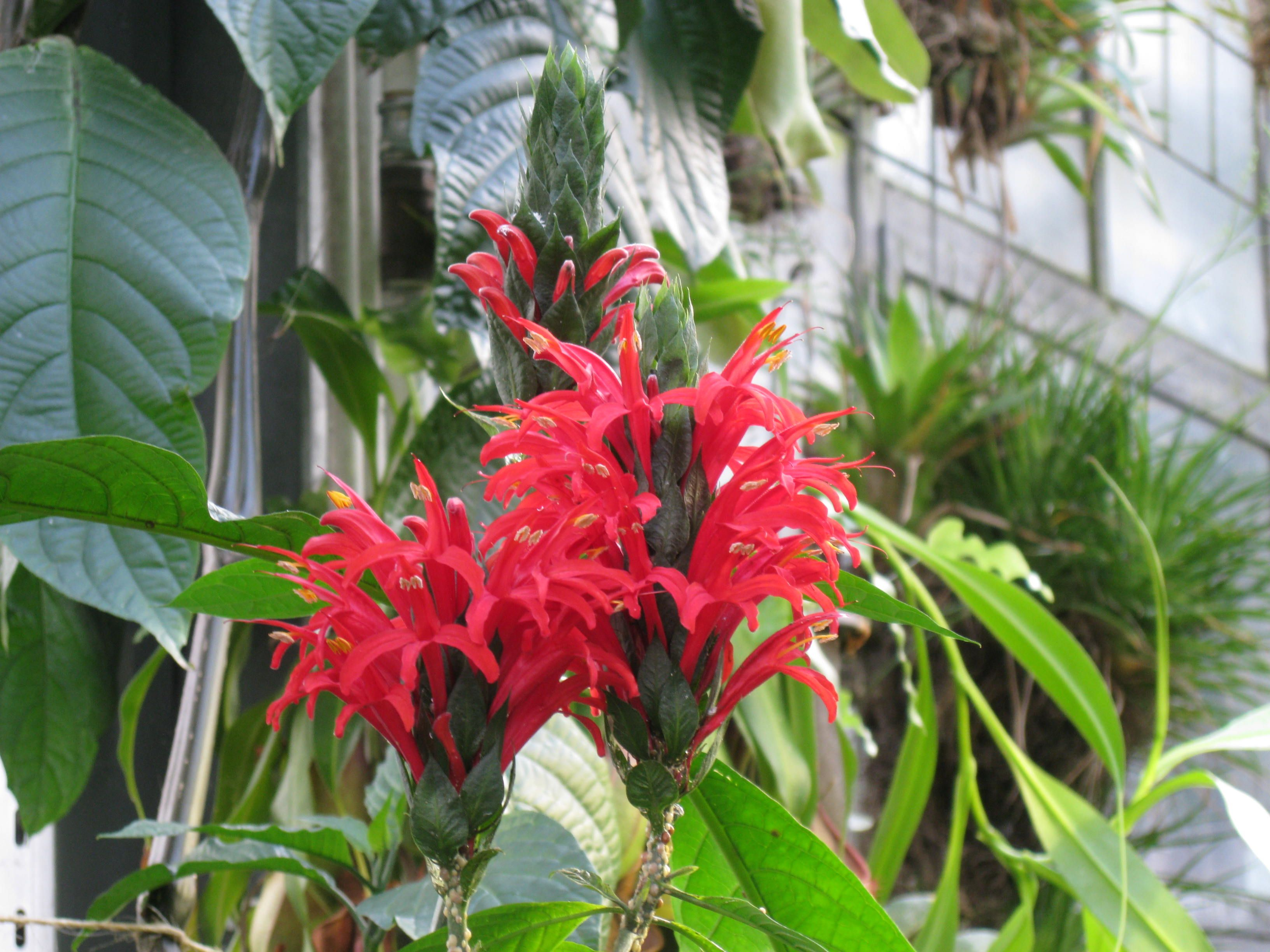
Pachystachys

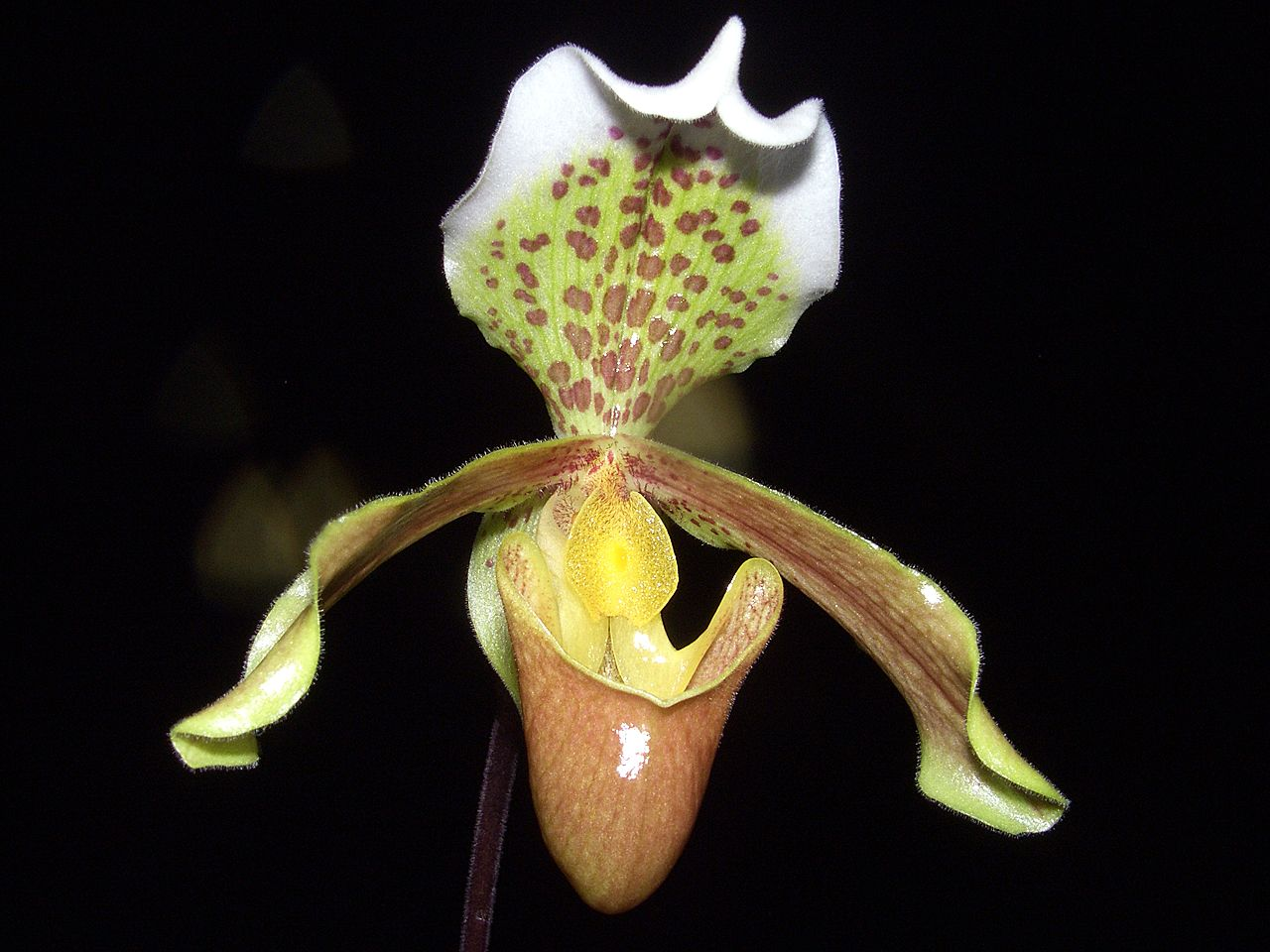
Paphiopedilum

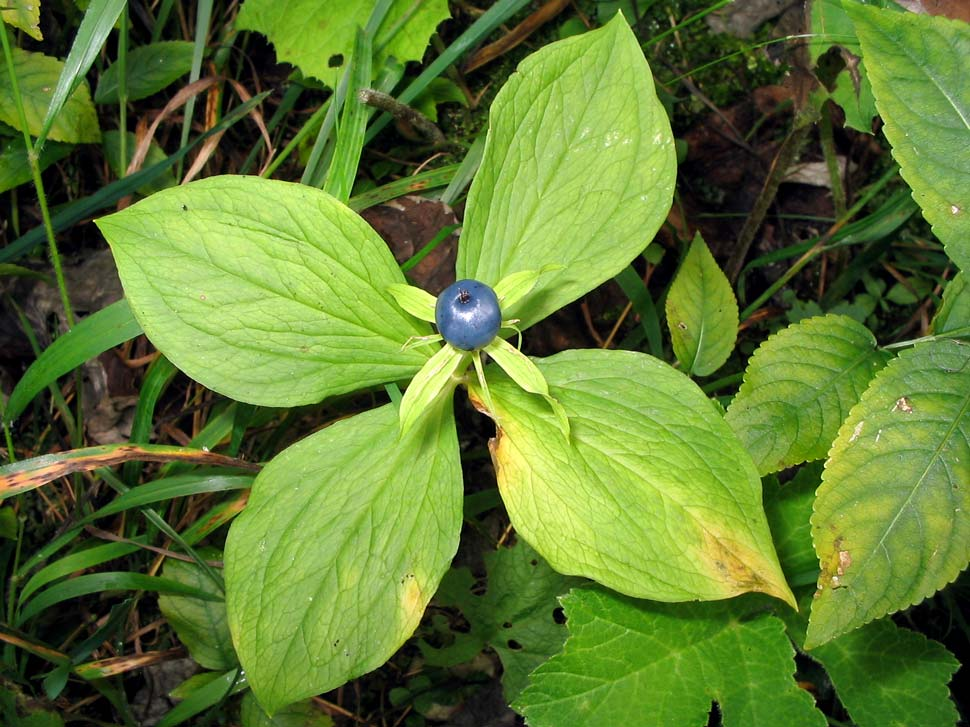
Paris

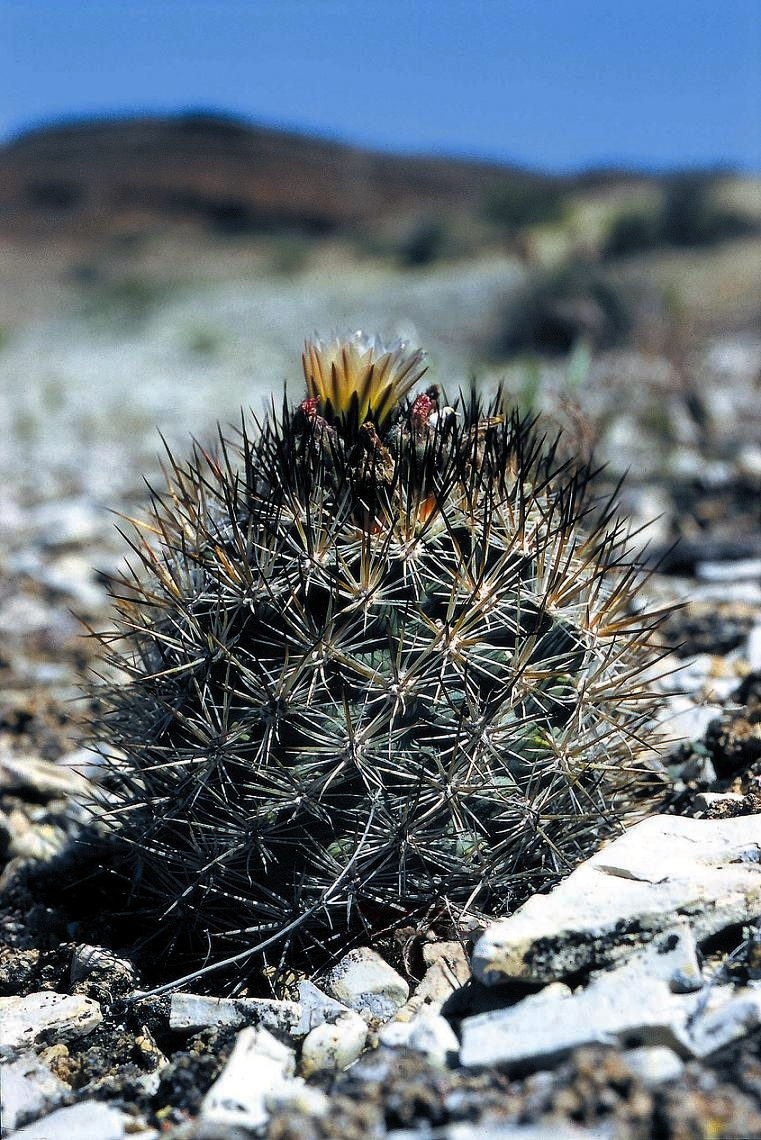
Pediocactus

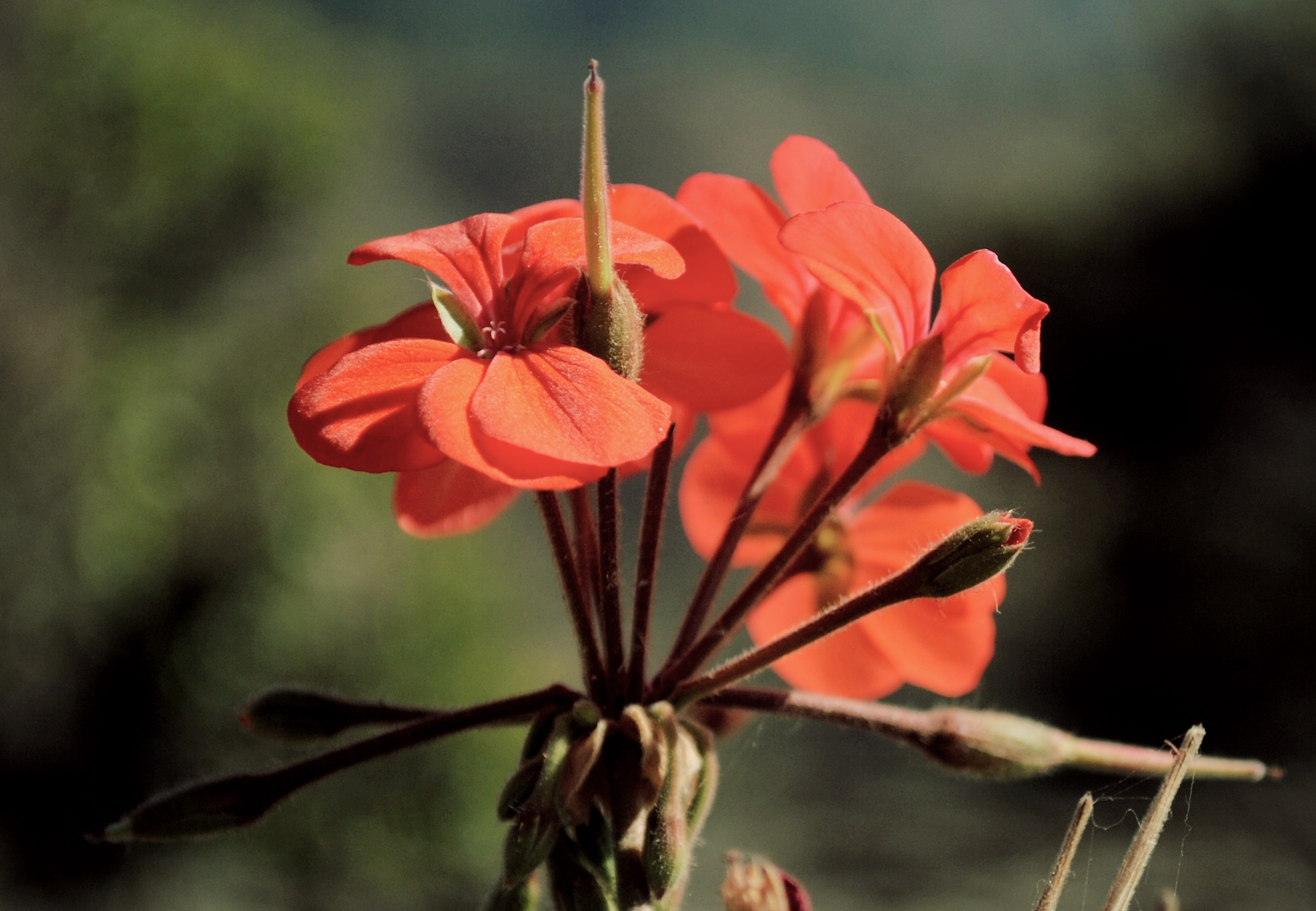
Pelargonium

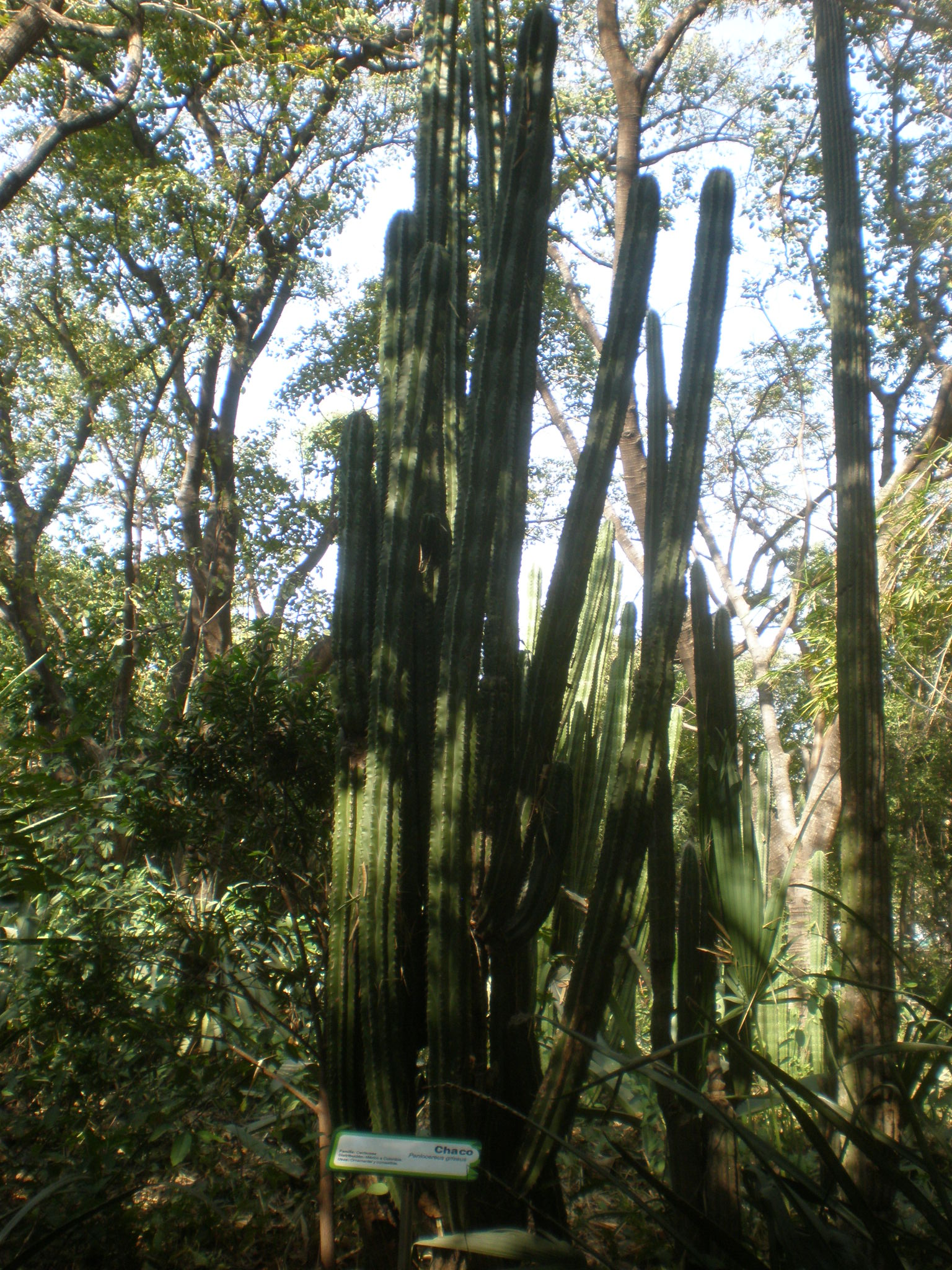
Peniocereus

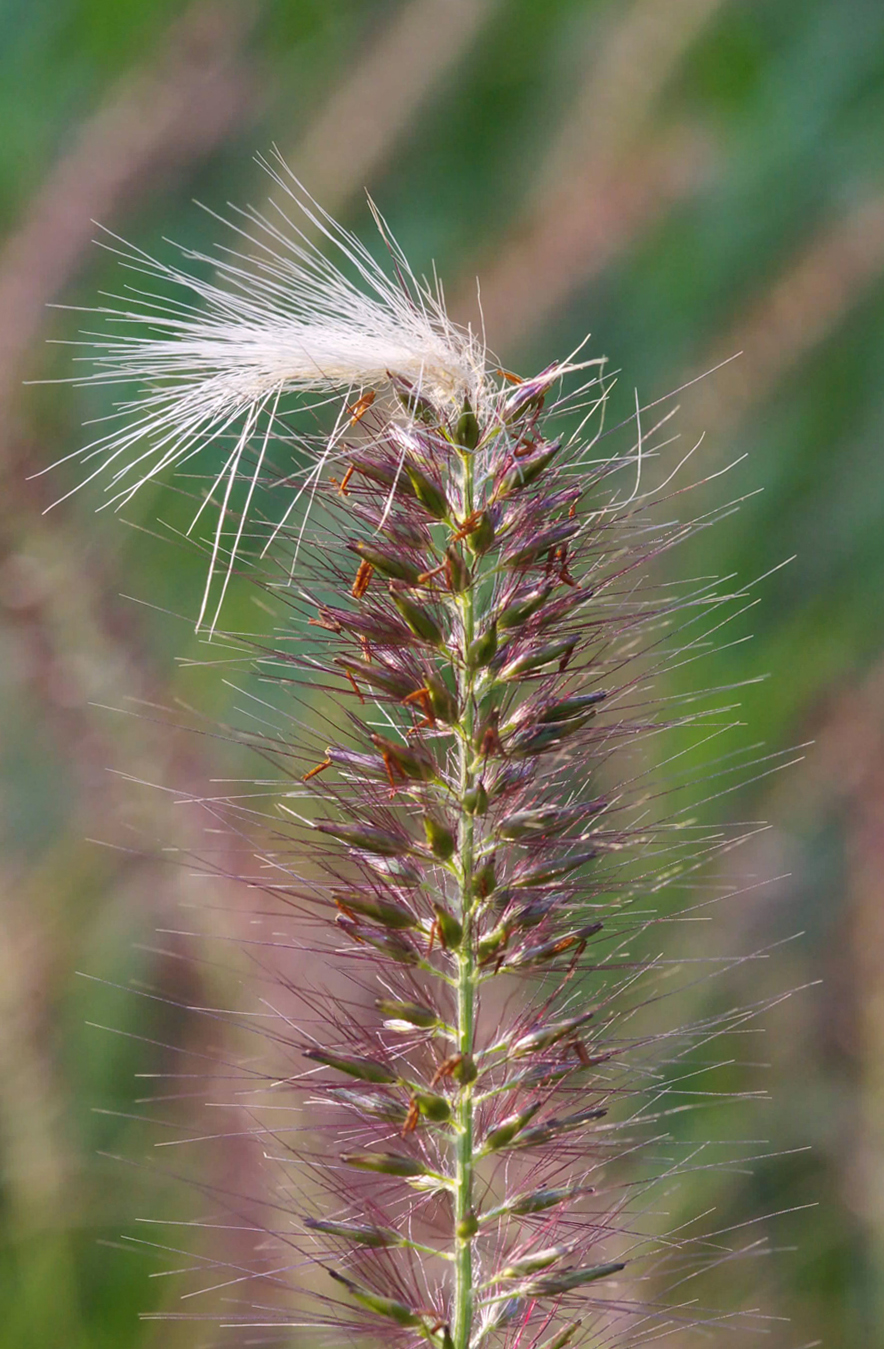
Pennisetum

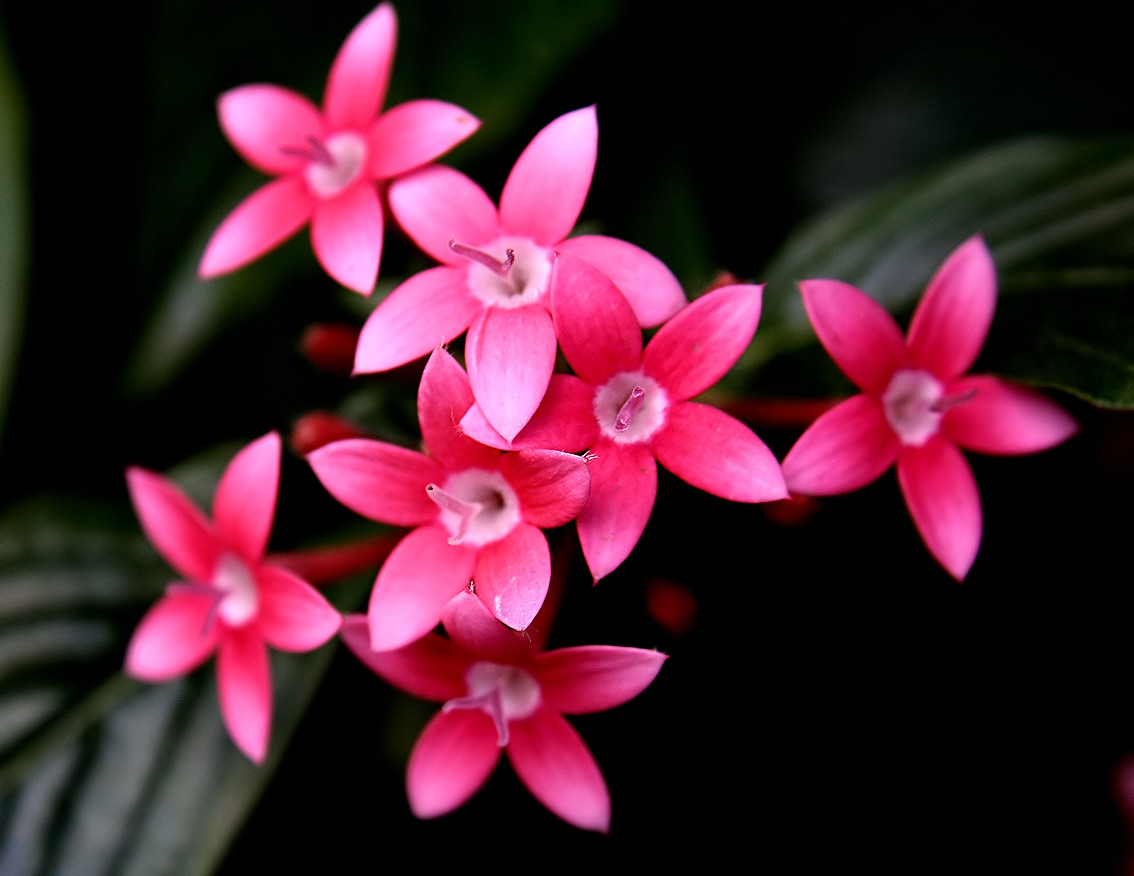
Pentas

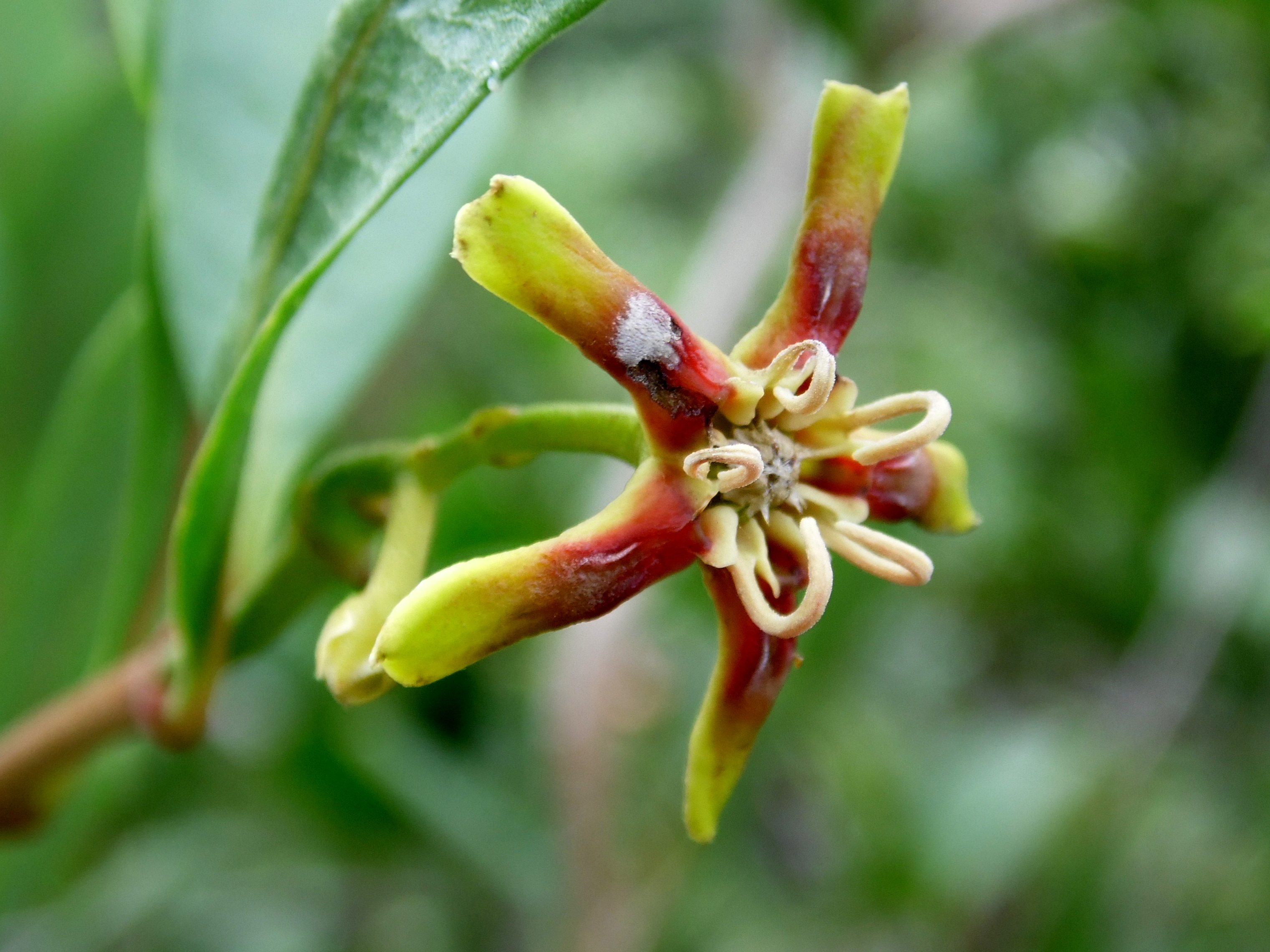
Periploca

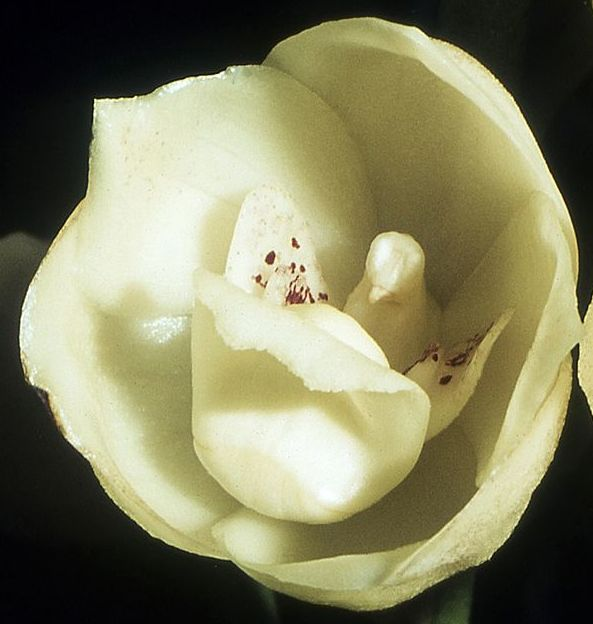
Peristeria

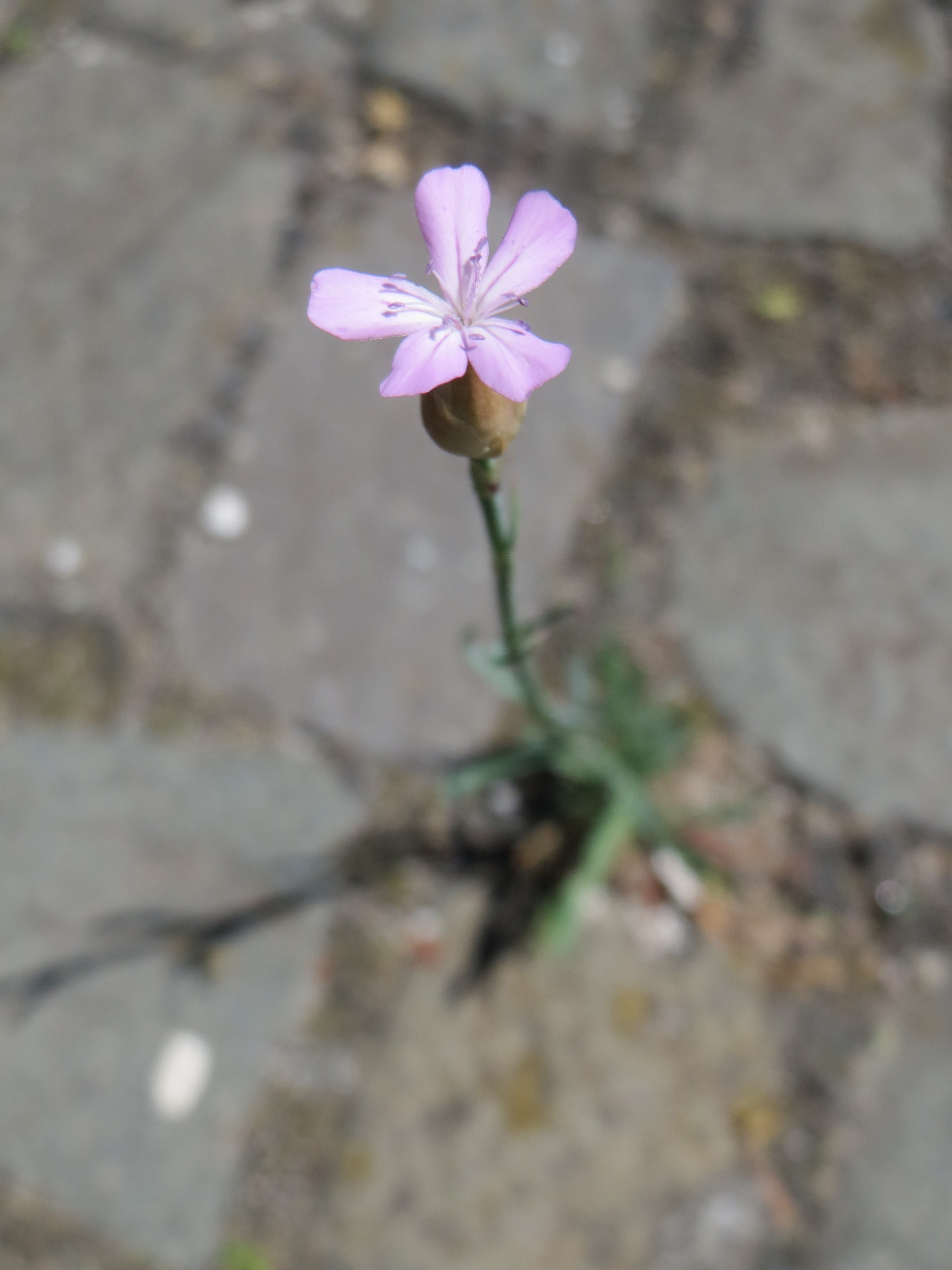
Petrorhagia

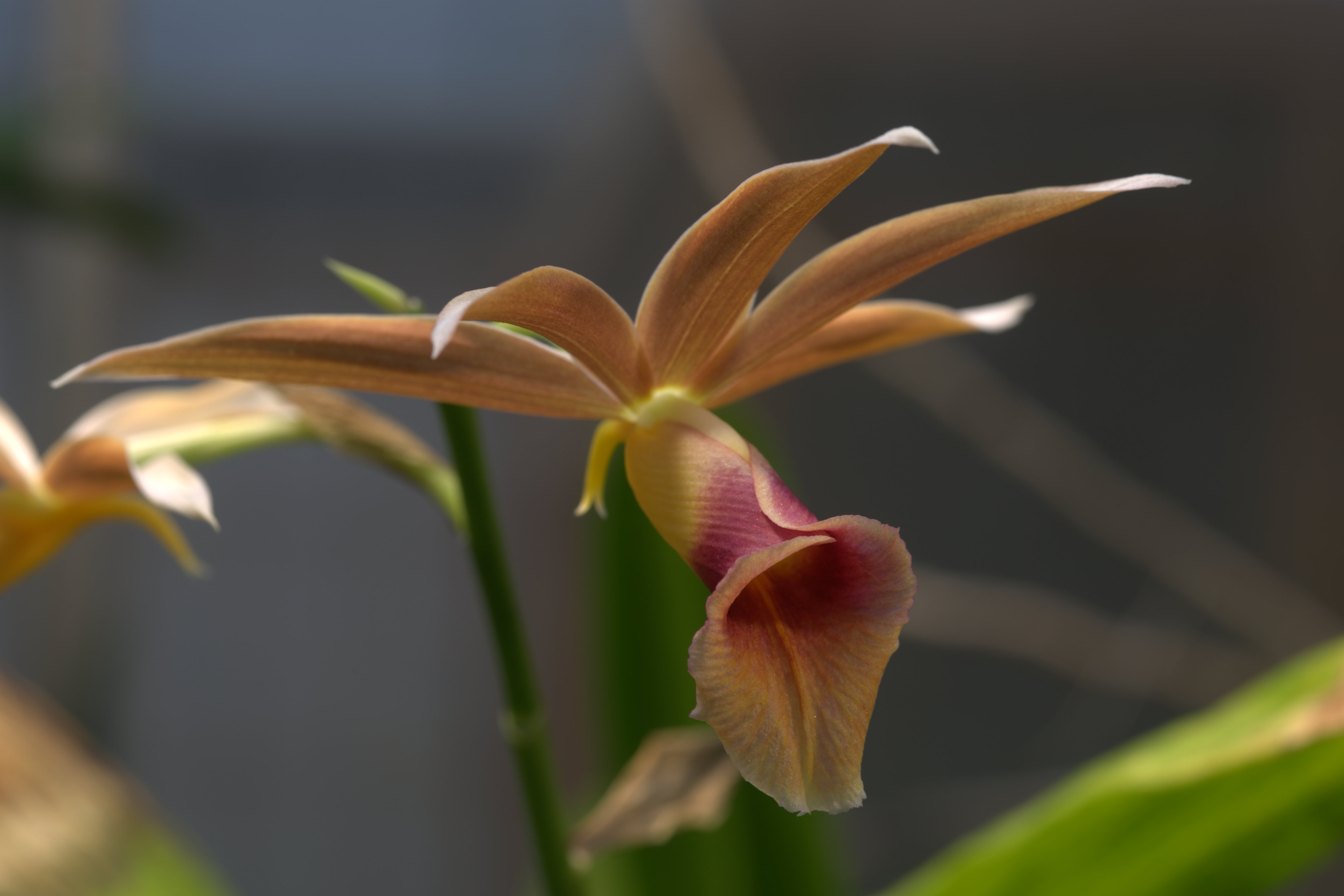
Phaius

Genera
Genus (Note: Page numbers for references are omitted, since all the references list genera alphabetically except for Plants of the World, which is mainly cited for genera that match their family names.)	Meaning or derivation	Family	Order	Ref	G
Lablab	Arabic name (Note: "(Language) name" means the name of some plant originally, not necessarily in this genus.)	Fabaceae	Fabales	Ba	G
Laburnum	Latin name	Fabaceae	Fabales	CS	G
Lacaena	Helen of Troy (Note: This list includes fictional and unattested characters; also see List of plant genera named after people (K–P).)	Orchidaceae	Asparagales	Bu	
Lachnanthes	woolly flowers	Haemodoraceae	Commelinales	St	
Lactuca	Latin: milky (the sap)	Asteraceae	Asterales	CS	G
Lagarosiphon	narrow tubes	Hydrocharitaceae	Alismatales	St	G
Lagarostrobos	loose or narrow cones	Podocarpaceae	Pinales	Ba	G
Lagenandra	flask-like male parts (the anthers)	Araceae	Alismatales	St	
Lagenaria	flask-like (the fruits)	Cucurbitaceae	Cucurbitales	St	G
Lagotis	rabbit ears	Plantaginaceae	Lamiales	St	G
Lagurus	rabbit tail (the inflorescences)	Poaceae	Poales	St	G
Lamium	Open mouth (the flowers). Latin name.	Lamiaceae	Lamiales	CS	G
Lampranthus	shining flowers	Aizoaceae	Caryophyllales	St	G
Lamprocapnos	bright smoke	Papaveraceae	Ranunculales	Ba	
Lantana	Medieval Latin name	Verbenaceae	Lamiales	CS	G
Lapsana	Greek and Latin name	Asteraceae	Asterales	Ba	G
Larix	Latin name	Pinaceae	Pinales	CS	G
Laserpitium	Latin name	Apiaceae	Apiales	St	G
Latania	name from Mauritius	Arecaceae	Arecales	St	G
Lathraea	hidden (the parasitic underground stems)	Orobanchaceae	Lamiales	St	G
Lathyrus	Greek name	Fabaceae	Fabales	CS	G
Laurelia	Latinised Spanish name	Atherospermataceae	Laurales	St	G
Laureliopsis	Laurelia-like	Monimiaceae	Laurales	Ba	
Laurus	Latin name	Lauraceae	Laurales	CS	G
Lavandula	Latin: washing (used in soap)	Lamiaceae	Lamiales	CS	G
Lemna	Greek name	Araceae	Alismatales	St	G
Lens	Latin name	Fabaceae	Fabales	St	G
Leonotis	lion ears (the flowers)	Lamiaceae	Lamiales	CS	G
Leontice	Greek name	Berberidaceae	Ranunculales	Ba	G
Leontodon	lion teeth (the leaf edges)	Asteraceae	Asterales	St	G
Leontopodium	lion feet	Asteraceae	Asterales	CS	G
Leonurus	lion tails (the inflorescences)	Lamiaceae	Lamiales	St	G
Lepidium	Greek and Latin name	Brassicaceae	Brassicales	St	G
Lepidozamia	scaly Zamia	Zamiaceae	Cycadales	Ba	G
Lepismium	scales (around the areoles)	Cactaceae	Caryophyllales	St	
Leptinella	slender	Asteraceae	Asterales	Ba	G
Leptodermis	thin skin (the bracteoles)	Rubiaceae	Gentianales	St	G
Leptopyrum	slender grain (the fruits)	Ranunculaceae	Ranunculales	St	
Leptospermum	slender seeds	Myrtaceae	Myrtales	CS	G
Leptotes	delicacy (the thin, terete leaves)	Orchidaceae	Asparagales	St	G
Lethia	Lethe, a mythological river	Iridaceae	Asparagales	Bu	
Leucadendron	white tree (the leaves)	Proteaceae	Proteales	St	G
Leucaena	white (the flowers)	Fabaceae	Fabales	St	G
Leucanthemum	white flowers	Asteraceae	Asterales	CS	G
Leucheria	white	Asteraceae	Asterales	St	G
Leucocoryne	white club (the staminodes)	Amaryllidaceae	Asparagales	St	G
Leucocrinum	white Crinum	Asparagaceae	Asparagales	St	G
Leucogenes	white + (perhaps) nobility	Asteraceae	Asterales	Ba	G
Leucojum	white and violet	Amaryllidaceae	Asparagales	CS	G
Leucopogon	white beard	Ericaceae	Ericales	Ba	G
Leucosceptrum	white scepter	Lamiaceae	Lamiales	Ba	G
Leucospermum	white seeds	Proteaceae	Proteales	Ba	G
Leucothoe	Greek mythological name	Ericaceae	Ericales	CS	G
Levisticum	Latin: (medicinal) relief	Apiaceae	Apiales	CS	G
Leymus	anagram of the related Elymus	Poaceae	Poales	Ba	G
Liatris	uncertain; possibly booty or bald	Asteraceae	Asterales	CS	G
Libocedrus	teardrop Cedrus (cedar resin)	Cupressaceae	Pinales	St	G
Licuala	Moluccan name	Arecaceae	Arecales	St	G
Ligularia	Latin: strap (the ray florets)	Asteraceae	Asterales	CS	G
Ligusticum	Greek name	Apiaceae	Apiales	CS	G
Ligustrum	Latin name	Oleaceae	Lamiales	CS	G
Lilium	Latin name	Liliaceae	Liliales	CS	G
Limnanthes	marsh flowers	Limnanthaceae	Brassicales	St	G
Limnobium	marsh life	Hydrocharitaceae	Alismatales	St	
Limnocharis	marsh beauty	Alismataceae	Alismatales	St	G
Limonium	Meadow. Greek name.	Plumbaginaceae	Caryophyllales	CS	G
Linanthus	Linum (flax) flowers	Polemoniaceae	Ericales	St	G
Linaria	Linum-like	Plantaginaceae	Lamiales	CS	G
Linum	Latin name	Linaceae	Malpighiales	CS	G
Liparis	oily (the leaves)	Orchidaceae	Asparagales	St	G
Liquidambar	Latin: liquid amber (the resin)	Altingiaceae	Saxifragales	CS	G
Liriodendron	lily tree	Magnoliaceae	Magnoliales	CS	G
Liriope	Greek mythological name	Asparagaceae	Asparagales	CS	G
Litchi	Chinese name	Sapindaceae	Sapindales	St	G
Lithocarpus	stone fruit (the nuts)	Fagaceae	Fagales	CS	G
Lithodora	stone gift (rocky habitat)	Boraginaceae	Boraginales	CS	G
Lithophragma	stone wall. Possibly an error, but some species do grow in stone walls.	Saxifragaceae	Saxifragales	St	G
Lithops	stony appearance	Aizoaceae	Caryophyllales	CS	G
Lithospermum	stone seeds. Latin name.	Boraginaceae	Boraginales	St	G
Lithraea	Chilean name	Anacardiaceae	Sapindales	St	
Litsea	Chinese name	Lauraceae	Laurales	St	G
Loasa	probably a South American name	Loasaceae	Cornales	St	G
Lobularia	Greek and Latin: little pods	Brassicaceae	Brassicales	CS	G
Lolium	Latin name	Poaceae	Poales	St	G
Lomandra	fringed male parts	Asparagaceae	Asparagales	Ba	G
Lomatia	with borders (the seed margins)	Apiaceae	Apiales	CS	G
Lomatium	fringe	Apiaceae	Apiales	Ba	G
Lonas	(unknown)	Asteraceae	Asterales	St	
Lonchocarpus	lance fruit	Fabaceae	Fabales	St	G
Lophomyrtus	crested Myrtus	Myrtaceae	Myrtales	Ba	G
Lophophora	crest-bearing (the tufts)	Cactaceae	Caryophyllales	St	G
Lophospermum	crested seeds	Plantaginaceae	Lamiales	Ba	G
Lordhowea	Ontong Java Atoll, formerly the Lord Howe Atoll, in the Solomon Islands	Asteraceae	Asterales	Bu	G
Loropetalum	strap petals	Hamamelidaceae	Saxifragales	CS	G
Lotus	Greek name	Fabaceae	Fabales	CS	G
Luculia	Nepalese name	Rubiaceae	Gentianales	St	G
Ludisia	(unknown)	Orchidaceae	Asparagales	Ba	
Luffa	Arabic name	Cucurbitaceae	Cucurbitales	St	G
Luma	Mapuche name	Myrtaceae	Myrtales	Ba	G
Lunaria	Latin: moon-like (the seed pods)	Brassicaceae	Brassicales	CS	G
Lupinus	Latin name	Fabaceae	Fabales	CS	G
Luzula	possibly Latin: small light (from the dewy sparkle), or yellowish, or Italian for a bioluminescent insect	Juncaceae	Poales	CS	G
Lycaste	(unclear)	Orchidaceae	Asparagales	St	G
Lycianthes	Lycium + flower	Solanaceae	Solanales	Ba	
Lycium	Greek and Latin name for a shrub from Lycia	Solanaceae	Solanales	CS	G
Lycopus	wolf foot (the leaves)	Lamiaceae	Lamiales	CS	G
Lysichiton	dissolving cloak (the spathes)	Araceae	Alismatales	CS	G
Lysionotus	releasing in the back (the capsule suture)	Gesneriaceae	Lamiales	St	G
Lythrum	bloody (the flowers)	Lythraceae	Myrtales	CS	G
Machaeranthera	sword anthers	Asteraceae	Asterales	Ba	G
Machaonia	Machaon, a mythological hero	Rubiaceae	Gentianales	Bu	
Macradenia	long gland (pollen stalks)	Orchidaceae	Asparagales	St	G
Macrozamia	large Zamia	Zamiaceae	Cycadales	St	G
Madhuca	Sanskrit name	Sapotaceae	Ericales	St	
Madia	Chilean name	Asteraceae	Asterales	St	G
Maesa	Arabic name	Primulaceae	Ericales	St	G
Magdalenaea	Santa Maria Madalena, Rio de Janeiro, in Brazil	Orobanchaceae	Lamiales	Bu	
Maianthemum	May flowers	Asparagaceae	Asparagales	CS	G
Maihuenia	Mapuche name	Cactaceae	Caryophyllales	Ba	
Malachra	Malva	Malvaceae	Malvales	St	
Mallotus	woolly	Euphorbiaceae	Malpighiales	St	G
Malope	Latin name	Malvaceae	Malvales	St	G
Malus	Greek and Latin name	Rosaceae	Rosales	CS	G
Malva	Latin name	Malvaceae	Malvales	CS	G
Malvastrum	Latin: mallow-like	Malvaceae	Malvales	St	G
Malvaviscus	Latin: mallow stickiness	Malvaceae	Malvales	St	G
Mammea	West Indian name	Calophyllaceae	Malpighiales	St	G
Mammillaria	Latin: nippled	Cactaceae	Caryophyllales	St	G
Mandragora	Greek and Latin name	Solanaceae	Solanales	St	G
Mangifera	Indian name	Anacardiaceae	Sapindales	St	G
Manihot	Brazilian name	Euphorbiaceae	Malpighiales	St	G
Manilkara	South Indian name	Sapotaceae	Ericales	St	
Manulea	Latin: hand, from the finger-like petals	Scrophulariaceae	Lamiales	St	
Margyricarpus	pearl fruit	Rosaceae	Rosales	St	G
Marrubium	Latin name	Lamiaceae	Lamiales	St	G
Mascarenhasia	Mascarene Islands	Apocynaceae	Gentianales	St	G
Matricaria	Latin name	Asteraceae	Asterales	St	G
Mauritia	Surinamese name	Arecaceae	Arecales	St	
Maxillaria	resembling an insect maxilla	Orchidaceae	Asparagales	St	G
Mayaca	French Guianese name	Mayacaceae	Poales	St	G
Maytenus	Chilean name	Celastraceae	Celastrales	CS	G
Mazus	teat, for swellings on the lower lip of the flowers	Mazaceae	Lamiales	CS	G
Meconopsis	poppy-like	Papaveraceae	Ranunculales	CS	G
Medeola	Medea of mythology	Liliaceae	Liliales	St	G
Medicago	Greek and Latin name	Fabaceae	Fabales	St	G
Medusagyne	Medusa (a mythological monster) + female parts	Ochnaceae	Malpighiales	Bu	
Medusandra	Medusa (a mythological monster) + male parts	Peridiscaceae	Saxifragales	Bu	
Medusantha	Medusa (a mythological monster) + flowers	Lamiaceae	Lamiales	Bu	
Medusanthera	Medusa (a mythological monster) + flowers	Stemonuraceae	Aquifoliales	Bu	
Megahertzia	Roaring Meg falls, or their waterway, in Queensland, Australia	Proteaceae	Proteales	Bu	
Megaskepasma	large covering (the bracts)	Acanthaceae	Lamiales	St	
Melaleuca	black and white	Myrtaceae	Myrtales	St	G
Melampodium	Melampus, a legendary oracle	Asteraceae	Asterales	Bu	
Melanthium	dark flowers	Melanthiaceae	Liliales	St	
Melasphaerula	black small bulbs	Iridaceae	Asparagales	St	G
Melastoma	black mouth. (The berries stain the mouth when eaten.)	Melastomataceae	Myrtales	St	G
Melia	Greek name	Meliaceae	Sapindales	CS	G
Melianthus	honey flowers, for its nectar	Francoaceae	Geraniales	CS	G
Melica	honey, for its sweet sap	Poaceae	Poales	CS	G
Melicoccus	honey berries. Previously Melicocca.	Sapindaceae	Sapindales	St	G
Melicope	honey cutting	Rutaceae	Sapindales	Ba	G
Melicytus	honey jar	Violaceae	Malpighiales	St	G
Melilotus	honey lotus or honey clover	Fabaceae	Fabales	St	G
Melinis	honey or blackish	Poaceae	Poales	Ba	G
Meliosma	honey-scented	Sabiaceae	Proteales	St	G
Melissa	honey bee	Lamiaceae	Lamiales	CS	G
Melittis	honey-bearing or honey bee	Lamiaceae	Lamiales	CS	G
Melliodendron	honey tree	Styracaceae	Ericales	Ba	
Melocactus	Latin: melon cactus	Cactaceae	Caryophyllales	St	G
Melothria	Greek and Latin name	Cucurbitaceae	Cucurbitales	St	G
Menispermum	moon seeds	Menispermaceae	Ranunculales	St	G
Mentha	Minthe of mythology	Lamiaceae	Lamiales	CS	G
Menyanthes	small flowers or moon flowers	Menyanthaceae	Asterales	CS	G
Mercurialis	Mercury of mythology	Euphorbiaceae	Malpighiales	St	G
Merope	Merope, one of the mythological Pleiades	Rutaceae	Sapindales	Bu	
Meryta	bunching (the male flower heads)	Araliaceae	Apiales	St	G
Mesembryanthemum	middle embryo flower (the ovaries)	Aizoaceae	Caryophyllales	St	G
Metrosideros	core of iron	Myrtaceae	Myrtales	St	G
Meum	Greek and Latin name	Apiaceae	Apiales	CS	G
Micranthemum	small flowers	Linderniaceae	Lamiales	St	
Microbiota	small Biota (now Platycladus)	Cupressaceae	Pinales	Ba	G
Microcachrys	small cones	Podocarpaceae	Pinales	Ba	G
Microglossa	small tongue (the ray florets)	Asteraceae	Asterales	St	G
Milium	Latin name	Poaceae	Poales	Ba	G
Mimosa	mimic (the leaves)	Fabaceae	Fabales	CS	G
Mimulus	Latin: little mimic (the flowers)	Phrymaceae	Lamiales	CS	G
Mimusops	monkey-face	Sapotaceae	Ericales	St	G
Mirabella	Mirabela, Brazil	Cactaceae	Caryophyllales	Bu	
Mirabilis	Latin: wonderful	Nyctaginaceae	Caryophyllales	CS	G
Miscanthus	stalk-flower (the small flower spikes)	Poaceae	Poales	CS	G
Mitella	small caps (the fruit)	Saxifragaceae	Saxifragales	CS	G
Mitraria	cap or turban (the fruit or inflorescences)	Gesneriaceae	Lamiales	CS	G
Molopospermum	striped seeds	Apiaceae	Apiales	St	G
Moluccella	Molucca (unknown connection)	Lamiaceae	Lamiales	CS	G
Momordica	Latin: bitten (appearance of the seeds)	Cucurbitaceae	Cucurbitales	St	G
Monanthes	single-flowered (the type specimen)	Crassulaceae	Saxifragales	St	
Moneses	single (flowered)	Ericaceae	Ericales	St	G
Monstera	Latin: monstrous (the leaves)	Araceae	Alismatales	CS	G
Morinda	Latin name + Indian	Rubiaceae	Gentianales	St	G
Moringa	Latinised Tamil name	Moringaceae	Brassicales	St	G
Mormodes	hobgoblin (the odd flowers)	Orchidaceae	Asparagales	St	G
Morus	Greek and Latin name	Moraceae	Rosales	CS	G
Moscharia	musk	Asteraceae	Asterales	St	
Mucuna	Brazilian name	Fabaceae	Fabales	St	G
Mukdenia	Mukden (now Shenyang), China	Saxifragaceae	Saxifragales	Ba	
Mulgedium	Latin: milking (from the sap)	Asteraceae	Asterales	St	G
Musa	Latinised Arabic name; also Antonius Musa (63 BC – 14)	Musaceae	Zingiberales	St	G
Muscari	Turkish name	Asparagaceae	Asparagales	CS	G
Mussaenda	Latinised Sinhalese name	Rubiaceae	Gentianales	St	G
Myoporum	closed pore (spots on the leaves)	Scrophulariaceae	Lamiales	St	G
Myosotidium	derived from Myosotis	Boraginaceae	Boraginales	CS	G
Myosotis	mouse ear (the leaves)	Boraginaceae	Boraginales	CS	G
Myosurus	mouse tail (the flower stalks)	Ranunculaceae	Ranunculales	St	G
Myrica	Greek and Latin name	Myricaceae	Fagales	CS	G
Myricaria	Myrica-like	Tamaricaceae	Caryophyllales	St	G
Myriocephalus	myriad heads (from the compound flower heads)	Asteraceae	Asterales	St	
Myriophyllum	myriad leaves	Haloragaceae	Saxifragales	CS	G
Myristica	fragrant ointment	Myristicaceae	Magnoliales	St	G
Myrmecodia	ant-place	Rubiaceae	Gentianales	Ba	
Myroxylon	fragrant-oil wood	Fabaceae	Fabales	St	
Myrrhis	Greek name	Apiaceae	Apiales	CS	G
Myrsine	Greek name	Primulaceae	Ericales	St	G
Myrtillocactus	myrtle cactus (for the myrtle-like fruit)	Cactaceae	Caryophyllales	St	
Myrtus	Greek and Latin name	Myrtaceae	Myrtales	CS	G
Mystacidium	mustache (the fringes)	Orchidaceae	Asparagales	St	G
Najas	naiad	Hydrocharitaceae	Alismatales	St	G
Nandina	Japanese name	Berberidaceae	Ranunculales	CS	G
Nannorrhops	dwarf bush	Arecaceae	Arecales	St	G
Napaea	Napaeae, nymphs of the woods	Malvaceae	Malvales	Bu	
Napeanthus	Napaeae (nymphs of the woods) + flowers	Gesneriaceae	Lamiales	Bu	
Narcissus	Narcissus of mythology	Amaryllidaceae	Asparagales	CS	G
Narthecium	Greek name	Nartheciaceae	Dioscoreales	St	G
Nassella	Latin: narrow-necked wicker basket	Poaceae	Poales	Ba	
Nasturtium	twisted nose	Brassicaceae	Brassicales	Ba	G
Nauclea	ship, possibly	Rubiaceae	Gentianales	St	G
Nautilocalyx	nautilus-calyx, possibly	Gesneriaceae	Lamiales	St	
Nelumbo	Sinhalese name	Nelumbonaceae	Proteales	St	G
Nemastylis	thread column (the styles)	Iridaceae	Asparagales	St	G
Nematanthus	thread flower (the flower stalks)	Restionaceae	Poales	St	G
Nemesia	Greek name	Scrophulariaceae	Lamiales	CS	G
Nemophila	clearing-loving	Hydrophyllaceae	Boraginales	CS	G
Neolitsea	new Litsea	Lauraceae	Laurales	Ba	G
Nepenthes	antidepressant	Nepenthaceae	Caryophyllales	St	G
Nepeta	Latin name	Lamiaceae	Lamiales	CS	G
Nephthytis	Nephthys of mythology	Araceae	Alismatales	St	G
Neptunia	Neptune of mythology (for its habitat)	Fabaceae	Fabales	St	G
Nerine	a sea nymph	Amaryllidaceae	Asparagales	CS	G
Nerium	Greek and Latin name	Apocynaceae	Gentianales	CS	G
Nertera	low (to the ground)	Rubiaceae	Gentianales	CS	G
Nidularium	Latin: little nest	Bromeliaceae	Poales	St	G
Nigella	Latin name	Ranunculaceae	Ranunculales	CS	G
Niphaea	snowy (the flowers)	Gesneriaceae	Lamiales	St	G
Nipponanthemum	Japan flower	Asteraceae	Asterales	Ba	G
Nolana	Latin: small bell (the flowers)	Solanaceae	Solanales	St	G
Nothofagus	false Fagus	Nothofagaceae	Fagales	CS	G
Notholirion	false lily	Liliaceae	Liliales	St	G
Notholithocarpus	false Lithocarpus	Fagaceae	Fagales	Ba	
Nothoscordum	false garlic	Liliaceae	Liliales	St	G
Notylia	back-bumps (on the stigmas)	Orchidaceae	Asparagales	St	
Nuphar	Arabic or Persian name	Nymphaeaceae	Nymphaeales	St	G
Nyctanthes	night-flowering	Oleaceae	Lamiales	St	G
Nymphaea	water nymphs	Nymphaeaceae	Nymphaeales	CS	G
Nymphoides	Nymphaea-like	Menyanthaceae	Asterales	St	G
Nyssa	Nysa, a water nymph	Nyssaceae	Cornales	CS	G
Oberonia	Oberon, a fairy king	Orchidaceae	Asparagales	Bu	
Oberonioides	Oberon, a fairy king	Orchidaceae	Asparagales	Bu	
Ochna	Greek name	Ochnaceae	Malpighiales	St	G
Ocimum	Greek and Latin name	Frankeniaceae	Caryophyllales	CS	G
Ocotea	French Guyanese name	Lauraceae	Laurales	St	
Octomeria	eight-part (the pollinia)	Orchidaceae	Asparagales	St	
Odontadenia	tooth gland (the pistils)	Apocynaceae	Gentianales	St	
Odyssea	odyssey or long voyage, a reference to the many genera to which the plant has been assigned	Poaceae	Poales	Bu	
Oenanthe	Greek name	Apiaceae	Apiales	St	G
Oenocarpus	wine fruit	Arecaceae	Arecales	St	G
Oenothera	Greek and Latin name	Onagraceae	Myrtales	CS	G
Olea	Latin name	Oleaceae	Lamiales	CS	G
Olsynium	little joined (stamens)	Iridaceae	Asparagales	Ba	
Omphalea	Omphale, a mythological queen	Euphorbiaceae	Malpighiales	Bu	
Omphalodes	navel-like (the seeds)	Boraginaceae	Boraginales	CS	G
Omphalogramma	navel-marked (the seeds)	Primulaceae	Ericales	St	G
Oncidium	little swelling (on the lips)	Orchidaceae	Asparagales	St	G
Oncoba	Arabic name	Salicaceae	Malpighiales	St	G
Onobrychis	(unclear)	Fabaceae	Fabales	St	G
Ononis	Greek and Latin name	Fabaceae	Fabales	St	G
Onopordum	Greek and Latin name	Asteraceae	Asterales	CS	G
Onosma	Greek and Latin name	Boraginaceae	Boraginales	St	G
Ophiopogon	Greek for a Japanese name	Asparagaceae	Asparagales	CS	G
Ophrys	Greek and Latin name	Orchidaceae	Asparagales	St	G
Oplismenus	weapons (the appearance of the spikelets)	Poaceae	Poales	St	G
Oplopanax	armed Panax (the spines)	Araliaceae	Apiales	St	G
Opopanax	sap panacea	Apiaceae	Apiales	St	G
Opuntia	Opus, Greece. Latin name.	Cactaceae	Caryophyllales	CS	G
Orbea	Latin: discs	Apocynaceae	Gentianales	St	
Orchis	testicle (the root tubers)	Orchidaceae	Asparagales	St	G
Oreocereus	mountain Cereus	Cactaceae	Caryophyllales	Ba	
Oreopanax	mountain Panax	Araliaceae	Apiales	St	G
Orestias	Orestes, a mythological hero	Orchidaceae	Asparagales	Bu	
Origanum	Greek and Latin name	Lamiaceae	Lamiales	CS	G
Orixa	from a Japanese name	Rutaceae	Sapindales	St	G
Ormosia	necklace (one use of the seeds)	Fabaceae	Fabales	St	G
Ornithogalum	bird's milk (the flowers or bulbs)	Asparagaceae	Asparagales	CS	G
Orobanche	Greek and Latin name	Orobanchaceae	Lamiales	St	G
Orontium	Greek name	Araceae	Alismatales	CS	G
Orostachys	mountain spike	Crassulaceae	Saxifragales	Ba	G
Oroxylum	mountain wood (one of its habitats). Previously Oroxylon.	Bignoniaceae	Lamiales	St	
Oroya	La Oroya, Peru	Cactaceae	Caryophyllales	Ba	
Orphium	Orpheus, a mythological prophet	Gentianaceae	Gentianales	Bu	G
Orthaea	Orthaea, one of the mythological Hyacinthides	Ericaceae	Ericales	Bu	
Orthocarpus	upright fruit	Orobanchaceae	Lamiales	St	G
Orthophytum	straight plant	Bromeliaceae	Poales	Ba	
Orthosia	Orthrus, a mythological monster	Apocynaceae	Gentianales	Bu	
Orthrosanthus	morning flowers	Iridaceae	Asparagales	St	G
Orychophragmus	dug-up partition (the pitted septa)	Brassicaceae	Brassicales	St	
Oryza	Latin and Greek name	Poaceae	Poales	St	G
Osmanthus	scented flowers	Oleaceae	Lamiales	CS	G
Osteomeles	bone apple (the nutlets)	Rosaceae	Rosales	St	G
Osteospermum	bone seed	Asteraceae	Asterales	Ba	G
Ostrya	Greek and Latin name	Betulaceae	Fagales	CS	G
Ostryopsis	Ostrya-like	Betulaceae	Fagales	Ba	G
Osyris	Latin name	Santalaceae	Santalales	Bu	G
Otatea	Mexican name	Poaceae	Poales	St	
Othonna	Greek and Latin name	Asteraceae	Asterales	CS	G
Ottelia	from a Malabar name	Hydrocharitaceae	Alismatales	St	G
Oxalis	Greek and Latin name	Oxalidaceae	Oxalidales	CS	G
Oxera	acid or acrid (the taste of the sap)	Lamiaceae	Lamiales	St	
Oxydendrum	sharp tree (the taste of the leaves)	Ericaceae	Ericales	CS	G
Oxylobium	sharp small pods	Fabaceae	Fabales	St	G
Oxypetalum	sharp petals	Apocynaceae	Gentianales	St	G
Oxyria	sharp (the taste)	Polygonaceae	Caryophyllales	St	G
Oxytropis	sharp keels (on the flowers)	Fabaceae	Fabales	St	G
Oziroe	Oziroe, a nymph	Asparagaceae	Asparagales	Bu	
Ozothamnus	strong-smelling shrub	Asteraceae	Asterales	Ba	G
Pachira	Guyanese name	Malvaceae	Malvales	St	G
Pachycereus	thick cactus	Cactaceae	Caryophyllales	St	
Pachycormus	thick, stripped trunk	Anacardiaceae	Sapindales	Ba	
Pachyphragma	thick walls (the septa)	Brassicaceae	Brassicales	CS	G
Pachyphytum	thick plant	Crassulaceae	Saxifragales	St	G
Pachypodium	thick foot	Apocynaceae	Gentianales	Ba	G
Pachyrhizus	thick roots	Fabaceae	Fabales	St	G
Pachysandra	thick male parts (the stamens)	Buxaceae	Buxales	CS	G
Pachystachys	thick spikes	Acanthaceae	Lamiales	CS	G
Pachystegia	thick cover	Asteraceae	Asterales	Ba	
Paederia	Latin: stinky	Rubiaceae	Gentianales	St	G
Paeonia	Greek and Latin name	Paeoniaceae	Saxifragales	CS	G
Palaquium	Philippine name	Sapotaceae	Ericales	St	G
Paliavana	possibly the palace of the Children of Palhavã in Portugal	Gesneriaceae	Lamiales	Bu	
Paliurus	Greek and Latin name	Rhamnaceae	Rosales	St	G
Panax	Latin name	Araliaceae	Apiales	St	G
Pancratium	Greek and Latin name	Amaryllidaceae	Asparagales	St	G
Pandanus	Malay name	Pandanaceae	Pandanales	St	G
Pandorea	Pandora of mythology	Bignoniaceae	Lamiales	CS	G
Panicum	Latin name	Poaceae	Poales	CS	G
Papaver	Latin name	Papaveraceae	Ranunculales	CS	G
Paphia	epithet of the goddess Aphrodite of Paphos	Ericaceae	Ericales	Bu	
Paphinia	Aphrodite of mythology	Orchidaceae	Asparagales	St	G
Paphiopedilum	Aphrodite's slipper (the flower lips)	Orchidaceae	Asparagales	St	G
Paraquilegia	similar to Aquilegia. Previously Paraquilega.	Ranunculaceae	Ranunculales	St	G
Paraserianthes	almost Serianthes	Fabaceae	Fabales	Ba	G
Parietaria	Latin: of walls (one habitat)	Urticaceae	Rosales	St	G
Paris	Latin: equal (the leaves)	Melanthiaceae	Liliales	CS	G
Parnassia	Mount Parnassus, Greece	Celastraceae	Celastrales	St	G
Parochetus	near rivulets (the habitat)	Fabaceae	Fabales	St	G
Paronychia	paronychia (a disease that these herbs were said to remedy)	Caryophyllaceae	Caryophyllales	St	G
Parthenice	Latin name; also an epithet of the goddess Artemis	Asteraceae	Asterales	Bu	
Parthenium	Greek and Latin name	Asteraceae	Asterales	CS	G
Parthenocissus	virgin ivy, derived from the common name	Vitaceae	Vitales	CS	G
Pasithea	Pasithea, a goddess	Asphodelaceae	Asparagales	Bu	G
Paspalum	Greek name	Poaceae	Poales	St	G
Passiflora	Latin: passion flowers	Passifloraceae	Malpighiales	CS	G
Pastinaca	Latin name	Apiaceae	Apiales	CS	G
Pavetta	Sinhalese name	Rubiaceae	Gentianales	St	G
Paxistima	thick stigmas	Celastraceae	Celastrales	Ba	G
Pedicularis	Latin: louse (from folklore about the plant)	Orobanchaceae	Lamiales	St	G
Pediocactus	plains cactus	Cactaceae	Caryophyllales	St	
Pelargonium	stork (the beak-shaped fruit)	Geraniaceae	Geraniales	CS	G
Pelecyphora	hatchet-bearing (the tubercles)	Cactaceae	Caryophyllales	St	
Peltandra	shield-stamens	Araceae	Alismatales	St	G
Peltaria	shield-like (the leaves)	Brassicaceae	Brassicales	St	G
Peltoboykinia	small-shield Boykinia	Saxifragaceae	Saxifragales	Ba	
Peltophorum	shield-bearing (the stigma)	Fabaceae	Fabales	St	G
Penelopeia	Penelope, a legendary heroine	Cucurbitaceae	Cucurbitales	Bu	
Peniocereus	filament cactus	Cactaceae	Caryophyllales	St	
Pennisetum	feather-bristle (the flower spikes)	Poaceae	Poales	CS	G
Penstemon	five stamens	Plantaginaceae	Lamiales	CS	G
Pentaglottis	five tongues (on the corolla)	Boraginaceae	Boraginales	St	G
Pentas	fives (the flower parts)	Rubiaceae	Gentianales	St	G
Peperomia	pepper-like	Piperaceae	Piperales	CS	G
Pericallis	very beautiful	Asteraceae	Asterales	Ba	G
Perilla	possibly Latin: little bag (the calyx)	Lamiaceae	Lamiales	St	G
Periploca	entwining (the corolla tubes)	Apocynaceae	Gentianales	St	G
Peristeria	dove-like (the orchid columns)	Orchidaceae	Asparagales	St	
Peristrophe	around-twisting (the corolla tubes)	Acanthaceae	Lamiales	St	G
Persea	Greek name	Lauraceae	Laurales	CS	G
Persicaria	leaves like Persica (peach)	Polygonaceae	Caryophyllales	CS	G
Petasites	sun-hats (the leaves). Greek name.	Asteraceae	Asterales	CS	G
Petrocallis	rock beauty (the habitat)	Brassicaceae	Brassicales	St	G
Petrocosmea	rock ornament	Gesneriaceae	Lamiales	Ba	G
Petromarula	Cretan name	Campanulaceae	Asterales	St	
Petrophile	rock lover. Previously Petrophila.	Proteaceae	Proteales	St	G
Petrophytum	rock plant. Previously Petrophyton.	Rosaceae	Rosales	St	G
Petrorhagia	rock-breaking	Caryophyllaceae	Caryophyllales	St	G
Petroselinum	Greek and Latin name	Apiaceae	Apiales	CS	G
Petunia	Tupi–Guarani name	Solanaceae	Solanales	CS	G
Peucedanum	Greek and Latin name	Apiaceae	Apiales	CS	G
Peumus	Chilean name	Monimiaceae	Laurales	St	G
Phacelia	bundles (the flowers)	Hydrophyllaceae	Boraginales	CS	G
Phaedranassa	bright queen (the flowers)	Amaryllidaceae	Asparagales	St	G
Phaius	twilight (the dark flowers)	Orchidaceae	Asparagales	St	G
Phalaenopsis	moth-like	Orchidaceae	Asparagales	St	G
Phalaris	Greek and Latin name	Poaceae	Poales	CS	G
Phaseolus	Latin name, from a Greek name	Fabaceae	Fabales	CS	G
Phebalium	possibly a Greek name	Rutaceae	Sapindales	St	G
Phellodendron	cork tree	Rutaceae	Sapindales	CS	G
Philesia	loving	Philesiaceae	Liliales	St	G
Phillyrea	Greek name	Oleaceae	Lamiales	CS	G
Philodendron	tree-loving (they are epiphytes)	Araceae	Alismatales	CS	G
Philotheca	loving box	Rutaceae	Sapindales	Ba	
Philyra	Greek name; also from Philyra, a nymph	Euphorbiaceae	Malpighiales	Bu	
Phleum	Greek name	Poaceae	Poales	St	G
Phlomis	flame (a use of the leaves)	Lamiaceae	Lamiales	CS	G
Phlox	flame (the flowers)	Polemoniaceae	Ericales	CS	G
Phoebanthus	bright (an epithet of the god Apollo) + flower	Asteraceae	Asterales	Bu	
Phoebe	Phoebe, a goddess	Lauraceae	Laurales	Bu	
Phoenix	Greek name	Arecaceae	Arecales	CS	G
Pholidota	scaly	Orchidaceae	Asparagales	St	G
Phormium	basket or mat (uses of the leaf fibres)	Asphodelaceae	Asparagales	CS	G
Photinia	shining (the foliage)	Rosaceae	Rosales	CS	G
Phragmipedium	partition slipper (the slipper-shaped lips)	Orchidaceae	Asparagales	St	
Phragmites	fence or hedge reeds	Poaceae	Poales	CS	G
Phuopsis	Valeriana-like	Rubiaceae	Gentianales	CS	G
Phygelius	fleeing the sun (they prefer shade)	Scrophulariaceae	Lamiales	CS	G
Phyla	tribes (probably the flower clusters)	Verbenaceae	Lamiales	St	G
Phylica	leafy	Rhamnaceae	Rosales	St	G
Phyllagathis	leafy ball of thread (the bracts)	Melastomataceae	Myrtales	St	
Phyllanthus	leaf-flowers (the source of some flowers)	Phyllanthaceae	Malpighiales	St	G
Phyllis	Latin name; also from Phyllis, a mythological princess	Rubiaceae	Gentianales	Bu	
Phyllocladus	leaf-branch (the flattened branches)	Podocarpaceae	Pinales	St	G
Phyllodoce	Nereid of mythology	Ericaceae	Ericales	St	G
Phyllostachys	leaf spike (the inflorescences)	Poaceae	Poales	CS	G
Physalis	bladders (the appearance of the fruit)	Solanaceae	Solanales	CS	G
Physaria	bladder-like	Brassicaceae	Brassicales	Ba	G
Physocarpus	bladder fruit	Ranunculaceae	Ranunculales	CS	G
Physochlaina	bladder covering (the inflated calyx)	Solanaceae	Solanales	CS	G
Physoplexis	bladder weaving (the corolla)	Campanulaceae	Asterales	St	G
Physostegia	bladder roofing (the inflated calyx)	Lamiaceae	Lamiales	St	G
Phytelephas	plant-elephant (for the ivory-like nut)	Arecaceae	Arecales	St	G
Phyteuma	Greek and Latin name	Campanulaceae	Asterales	St	G
Phytolacca	plant lac	Phytolaccaceae	Caryophyllales	CS	G
Picea	Latin name	Pinaceae	Pinales	CS	G
Picrasma	bitterness	Simaroubaceae	Sapindales	Ba	G
Pieris	Pieria, the home of the mythological Muses	Ericaceae	Ericales	CS	G
Pilea	Latin: caps (the shape of the calyx)	Urticaceae	Rosales	CS	G
Pilosella	hairy + little	Asteraceae	Asterales	Ba	G
Pilosocereus	hairy Cereus	Cactaceae	Caryophyllales	Ba	
Pimelea	fat or lard (its oils)	Thymelaeaceae	Malvales	St	G
Pimenta	Spanish name	Myrtaceae	Myrtales	St	G
Pimpinella	from a Medieval Latin name	Apiaceae	Apiales	St	G
Pinanga	Malayan name	Arecaceae	Arecales	St	
Pinguicula	fatty (the leaves)	Lentibulariaceae	Lamiales	St	G
Pinus	Latin name	Pinaceae	Pinales	CS	G
Piper	Latin name, from Sanskrit and Greek names	Piperaceae	Piperales	St	G
Piptadenia	falling glands (of the stamens)	Fabaceae	Fabales	St	G
Piptanthus	falling flowers (all parts fall at the same time)	Fabaceae	Fabales	CS	G
Piscidia	Latin: fish-killing (a use of the plant)	Fabaceae	Fabales	St	G
Pistacia	Greek and Latin name	Anacardiaceae	Sapindales	CS	G
Pistia	water	Araceae	Alismatales	CS	G
Pisum	Greek and Latin name	Fabaceae	Fabales	CS	G
Pithecellobium	Greek rendering of a Brazilian name for "monkey's earring" (the fruit)	Fabaceae	Fabales	St	G
Pittosporum	tar seeds	Pittosporaceae	Apiales	CS	G
Plagianthus	asymmetrical flowers	Poaceae	Poales	St	G
Plagiobothrys	oblique scars (on the nutlets)	Boraginaceae	Boraginales	St	
Plantago	Latin name	Plantaginaceae	Lamiales	CS	G
Platanus	Greek and Latin name	Platanaceae	Proteales	CS	G
Platycarya	broad nuts	Juglandaceae	Fagales	St	G
Platycladus	broad branches	Cupressaceae	Pinales	Ba	G
Platycodon	broad bell (the flowers)	Campanulaceae	Asterales	CS	G
Platystemon	broad stamens	Papaveraceae	Ranunculales	St	
Plectranthus	spur-flowers	Lamiaceae	Lamiales	CS	G
Pleioblastus	many buds	Poaceae	Poales	CS	G
Pleione	Pleione of mythology	Orchidaceae	Asparagales	CS	G
Pleiospilos	many spots (on the leaves)	Aizoaceae	Caryophyllales	St	G
Pleurothallis	side or rib branches (perhaps the inflorescences or stems)	Orchidaceae	Asparagales	St	
Plumbago	Latin name	Plumbaginaceae	Caryophyllales	CS	G
Poa	Greek name	Poaceae	Poales	CS	G
Podachaenium	stalked achenes	Asteraceae	Asterales	St	
Podalyria	Podalirius of mythology	Fabaceae	Fabales	St	G
Podocarpus	stalked fruit	Podocarpaceae	Pinales	CS	G
Podolepis	foot of scales (the pedicels)	Asteraceae	Asterales	St	G
Podophyllum	foot-leaves (for the resemblance to duck's feet)	Berberidaceae	Ranunculales	CS	G
Podranea	anagram of the related Pandorea	Bignoniaceae	Lamiales	St	G
Pogonatherum	bearded awn (the glumes)	Poaceae	Poales	St	G
Pogonia	bearded (the fringed lips)	Orchidaceae	Asparagales	St	
Pogostemon	bearded stamens	Lamiaceae	Lamiales	St	
Polemonium	Greek and Latin name	Polemoniaceae	Ericales	CS	G
Poliothyrsis	grey panicles	Salicaceae	Malpighiales	St	G
Polygala	Greek and Latin name	Polygalaceae	Fabales	CS	G
Polygonatum	Greek and Latin name	Asparagaceae	Asparagales	CS	G
Polygonum	Greek and Latin name	Polygonaceae	Caryophyllales	St	G
Polylepis	many scales	Rosaceae	Rosales	Ba	G
Polymnia	Polyhymnia, a Muse	Asteraceae	Asterales	Bu	
Polyscias	many sun-shades (the umbels)	Araliaceae	Apiales	St	G
Polyspora	many seeds	Theaceae	Ericales	Ba	
Polystachya	many spikes (on the inflorescences)	Orchidaceae	Asparagales	St	G
Pomaderris	lid of skin (on the capsules)	Rhamnaceae	Rosales	St	G
Populus	Latin name	Salicaceae	Malpighiales	CS	G
Porana	possibly from a Marathi name	Convolvulaceae	Solanales	St	G
Portulaca	Latin name	Portulacaceae	Caryophyllales	St	G
Portulacaria	Portulaca-like	Didiereaceae	Caryophyllales	St	
Posidonia	Poseidon, a god	Posidoniaceae	Alismatales	Bu	G
Posoqueria	Guianan name	Rubiaceae	Gentianales	St	
Potamogeton	Greek and Latin name	Potamogetonaceae	Alismatales	St	G
Potentilla	Latin: potent (medicinally)	Rosaceae	Rosales	CS	G
Pothos	Sinhalese name	Araceae	Alismatales	St	G
Pouteria	Carib name	Sapotaceae	Ericales	St	
Premna	stump	Lamiaceae	Lamiales	St	G
Prenanthes	downward-facing flowers	Asteraceae	Asterales	St	G
Primula	Medieval Latin name	Primulaceae	Ericales	CS	G
Primulina	Primula-like	Gesneriaceae	Lamiales	Ba	G
Proboscidea	(elephant) trunks (the fruit)	Martyniaceae	Lamiales	St	G
Procris	Procris, a mythological princess	Urticaceae	Rosales	Bu	
Promenaea	Promenaea, a Greek priestess of Dodona	Orchidaceae	Asparagales	St	
Prometheum	Prometheus, a god	Crassulaceae	Saxifragales	Bu	
Prosartes	appendage	Liliaceae	Liliales	Ba	
Proserpinaca	Latin name	Haloragaceae	Saxifragales	St	G
Prosopis	Greek name	Fabaceae	Fabales	St	G
Prospero	Prospero of William Shakespeare's The Tempest	Asparagaceae	Asparagales	Bu	
Prostanthera	addition to the anther (the spurs)	Lamiaceae	Lamiales	CS	G
Protea	Proteus of mythology	Proteaceae	Proteales	St	G
Prumnopitys	hindmost pine	Podocarpaceae	Pinales	Ba	G
Prunella	from a German name	Lamiaceae	Lamiales	CS	G
Prunus	Latin name	Rosaceae	Rosales	CS	G
Psammophora	sandy	Aizoaceae	Caryophyllales	St	
Pseuderanthemum	false Eranthemum	Acanthaceae	Lamiales	St	G
Pseudocydonia	false Cydonia	Rosaceae	Rosales	Ba	G
Pseudofumaria	false Fumaria	Papaveraceae	Ranunculales	CS	
Pseudogynoxys	false Gynoxis	Asteraceae	Asterales	Ba	
Pseudolarix	false Larix	Pinaceae	Pinales	CS	G
Pseudopanax	false Panax	Araliaceae	Apiales	CS	G
Pseudophoenix	false Phoenix	Arecaceae	Arecales	St	G
Pseudosasa	false Sasa	Poaceae	Poales	CS	G
Pseudotsuga	false Tsuga	Pinaceae	Pinales	CS	G
Pseudowintera	false Wintera (Drimys)	Winteraceae	Canellales	CS	G
Psidium	Latin name, from a Greek name	Myrtaceae	Myrtales	St	G
Psophocarpus	noisy fruit (the exploding capsules)	Fabaceae	Fabales	St	
Psoralea	scabby	Fabaceae	Fabales	St	G
Psychotria	from a Greek name	Rubiaceae	Gentianales	St	G
Ptelea	Greek name	Rutaceae	Sapindales	CS	G
Pteridophyllum	fern leaves	Papaveraceae	Ranunculales	St	G
Pterocarya	winged nuts	Juglandaceae	Fagales	CS	G
Pteroceltis	winged Celtis	Cannabaceae	Rosales	Ba	G
Pterocephalus	winged head (the feathery fruiting heads)	Caprifoliaceae	Dipsacales	St	G
Pterospermum	winged seeds	Malvaceae	Malvales	St	
Pterostyrax	winged Styrax	Styracaceae	Ericales	CS	G
Ptychosperma	folded seeds	Arecaceae	Arecales	St	G
Pulicaria	Latin name	Asteraceae	Asterales	St	G
Pulmonaria	Latin: lungs, from the supposed resemblance to diseased lungs	Boraginaceae	Boraginales	CS	G
Pulsatilla	(unclear)	Ranunculaceae	Ranunculales	St	G
Punica	Latin name	Lythraceae	Myrtales	CS	G
Puya	Chilean name of Puya chilensis	Bromeliaceae	Poales	CS	G
Pycnanthemum	dense flowers	Lamiaceae	Lamiales	St	G
Pycnostachys	dense spikes	Lamiaceae	Lamiales	St	G
Pyracantha	fire thorns	Rosaceae	Rosales	CS	G
Pyrola	diminutive of Pyrus	Ericaceae	Ericales	St	G
Pyrostegia	fire roofs, from the upper lip	Bignoniaceae	Lamiales	St	G
Pyrus	Latin name	Rosaceae	Rosales	CS	G
Pyxidanthera	boxed anthers (with lids)	Diapensiaceae	Ericales	St	G

== See also ==
- Glossary of botanical terms
- List of Greek and Latin roots in English
- List of Latin and Greek words commonly used in systematic names
- List of plant genera named after people: A–C, D–J, K–P, Q–Z
- List of plant family names with etymologies
