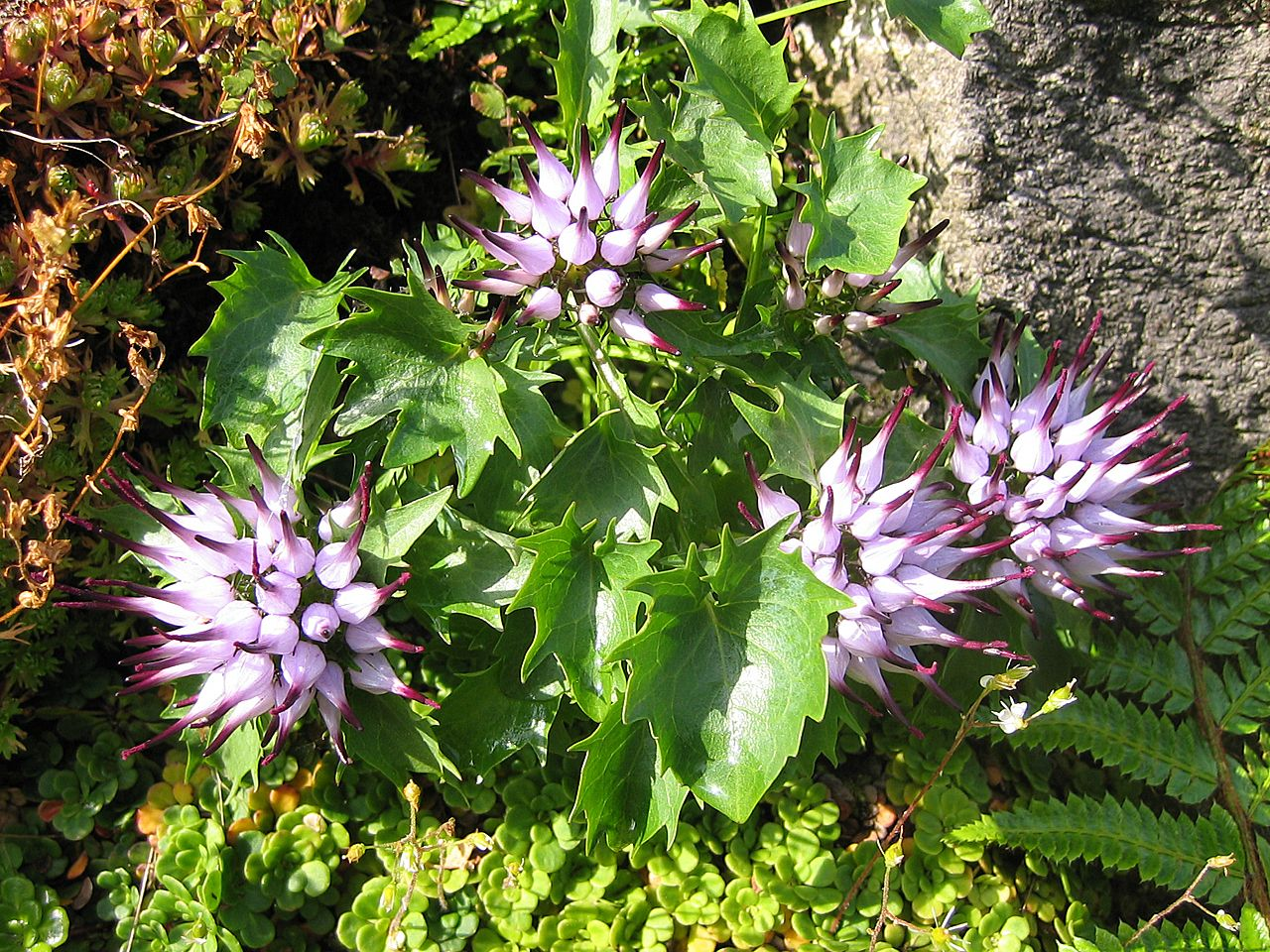

Conservation status
- Least Concern (IUCN 3.1)

Scientific classification
- Kingdom: Plantae
- Clade: Tracheophytes
- Clade: Angiosperms
- Clade: Eudicots
- Clade: Asterids
- Order: Asterales
- Family: Campanulaceae
- Subfamily: Campanuloideae
- Genus: Physoplexis; Schur (1853)
- Species: P. comosa

Binomial name
- Physoplexis comosa (L.) Schur (1853)

Synonyms
- Schellanderia Francisci (1878); Synotoma (G.Don) Rich.Schulz (1904); Phyteuma comosum L. (1753); Phyteuma comosum var. beguinotii Bolzon (1907); Phyteuma comosum var. pubescens Facchini ex Murr (1898); Rapunculus comosus (L.) Mill. (1768); Synotoma comosum (L.) Dalla Torre & Sarnth. (1911); Synotoma comosum var. pubescens (Facchini ex Murr) Dalla Torre & Sarnth. (1911); Schellanderia carinthiaca Francisci (1878)

= Physoplexis =

Genus of flowering plants

Physoplexis comosa, the tufted horned rampion, is a species of flowering plant in the family Campanulaceae, native to alpine Europe. It is the only species in its genus, and was formerly included in Phyteuma. Molecular evidence closely links this species with Phyteuma nigrum.

It is an herbaceous perennial growing to 8 cm (3 in) tall by 10 cm (4 in) wide, with glossy toothed narrow oval leaves, and dense umbels of necked, pale mauve flowers with prominent purple tips (tufts) in summer. It is found in the Alps at elevations of 300–2,000 m (984–6,562 ft).

The specific epithet comosa means "tufted".

In cultivation it is suitable for the rockery or alpine garden, and has gained the Royal Horticultural Society's Award of Garden Merit.
