= Frimaire =

3rd month in the French Republican calendar

Frimaire (French pronunciation: [fʁimɛʁ]) was the third month in the French Republican calendar. The month was named after the French word frimas 'frost'.

Frimaire was the third month of the autumn quarter (mois d'automne). It started between 21 November and 23 November, ending between 20 December and 22 December. It follows Brumaire and precedes Nivôse.

Year: 3
Month: Frimaire
Year: III

Day of the 10-day
week (décade)
Primidi
Duodi
Tridi
Quartidi
Quintidi
Sextidi
Septidi
Octidi
Nonidi
Décadi

décade 7
1	Friday; 21 November 1794
2	Saturday; 22 November 1794
3	Sunday; 23 November 1794
4	Monday; 24 November 1794
5	Tuesday; 25 November 1794
6	Wednesday; 26 November 1794
7	Thursday; 27 November 1794
8	Friday; 28 November 1794
9	Saturday; 29 November 1794
10	Sunday; 30 November 1794

décade 8
11	Monday; 1 December 1794
12	Tuesday; 2 December 1794
13	Wednesday; 3 December 1794
14	Thursday; 4 December 1794
15	Friday; 5 December 1794
16	Saturday; 6 December 1794
17	Sunday; 7 December 1794
18	Monday; 8 December 1794
19	Tuesday; 9 December 1794
20	Wednesday; 10 December 1794

décade 9
21	Thursday; 11 December 1794
22	Friday; 12 December 1794
23	Saturday; 13 December 1794
24	Sunday; 14 December 1794
25	Monday; 15 December 1794
26	Tuesday; 16 December 1794
27	Wednesday; 17 December 1794
28	Thursday; 18 December 1794
29	Friday; 19 December 1794
30	Saturday; 20 December 1794

Decimal time – 10 h/day
Paris
0h50m20s

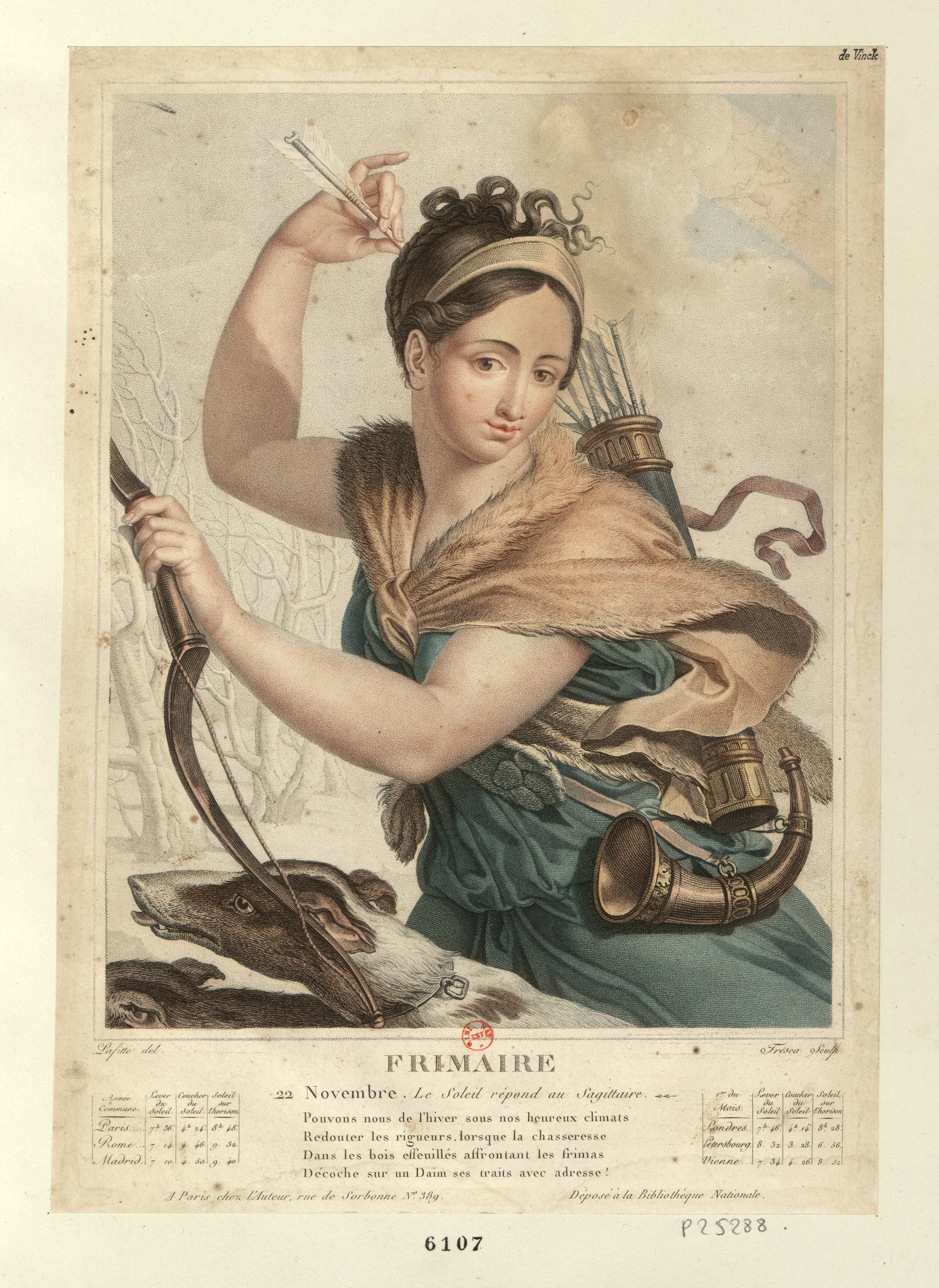
Frimaire

01:02:57
Time of day - 24 h/day
Greenwich

Conversion between Republican and Gregorian calendar for the years I - XIV

Year: 1
Month: Frimaire
Year: I

Day of the 10-day
week (décade)
Primidi
Duodi
Tridi
Quartidi
Quintidi
Sextidi
Septidi
Octidi
Nonidi
Décadi

décade 7
1	Wednesday; 21 November 1792
2	Thursday; 22 November 1792
3	Friday; 23 November 1792
4	Saturday; 24 November 1792
5	Sunday; 25 November 1792
6	Monday; 26 November 1792
7	Tuesday; 27 November 1792
8	Wednesday; 28 November 1792
9	Thursday; 29 November 1792
10	Friday; 30 November 1792

décade 8
11	Saturday; 1 December 1792
12	Sunday; 2 December 1792
13	Monday; 3 December 1792
14	Tuesday; 4 December 1792
15	Wednesday; 5 December 1792
16	Thursday; 6 December 1792
17	Friday; 7 December 1792
18	Saturday; 8 December 1792
19	Sunday; 9 December 1792
20	Monday; 10 December 1792

décade 9
21	Tuesday; 11 December 1792
22	Wednesday; 12 December 1792
23	Thursday; 13 December 1792
24	Friday; 14 December 1792
25	Saturday; 15 December 1792
26	Sunday; 16 December 1792
27	Monday; 17 December 1792
28	Tuesday; 18 December 1792
29	Wednesday; 19 December 1792
30	Thursday; 20 December 1792

Decimal time – 10 h/day
Paris
0:43:71

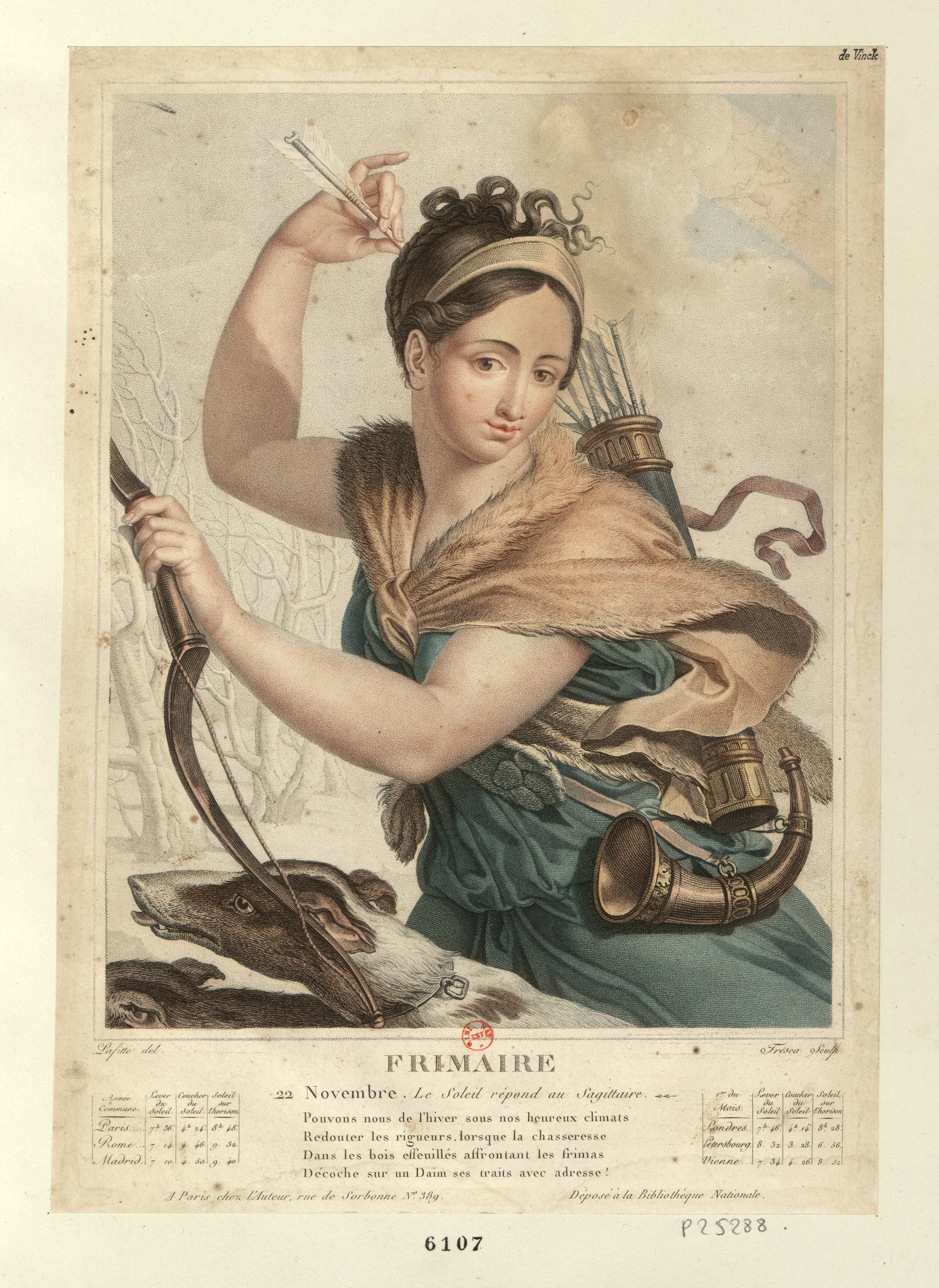
Frimaire

01:02:57
Time of day - 24 h/day
Greenwich

Year: 2
Month: Frimaire
Year: II

Day of the 10-day
week (décade)
Primidi
Duodi
Tridi
Quartidi
Quintidi
Sextidi
Septidi
Octidi
Nonidi
Décadi

décade 7
1	Thursday; 21 November 1793
2	Friday; 22 November 1793
3	Saturday; 23 November 1793
4	Sunday; 24 November 1793
5	Monday; 25 November 1793
6	Tuesday; 26 November 1793
7	Wednesday; 27 November 1793
8	Thursday; 28 November 1793
9	Friday; 29 November 1793
10	Saturday; 30 November 1793

décade 8
11	Sunday; 1 December 1793
12	Monday; 2 December 1793
13	Tuesday; 3 December 1793
14	Wednesday; 4 December 1793
15	Thursday; 5 December 1793
16	Friday; 6 December 1793
17	Saturday; 7 December 1793
18	Sunday; 8 December 1793
19	Monday; 9 December 1793
20	Tuesday; 10 December 1793

décade 9
21	Wednesday; 11 December 1793
22	Thursday; 12 December 1793
23	Friday; 13 December 1793
24	Saturday; 14 December 1793
25	Sunday; 15 December 1793
26	Monday; 16 December 1793
27	Tuesday; 17 December 1793
28	Wednesday; 18 December 1793
29	Thursday; 19 December 1793
30	Friday; 20 December 1793

Decimal time – 10 h/day
Paris
0:43:71

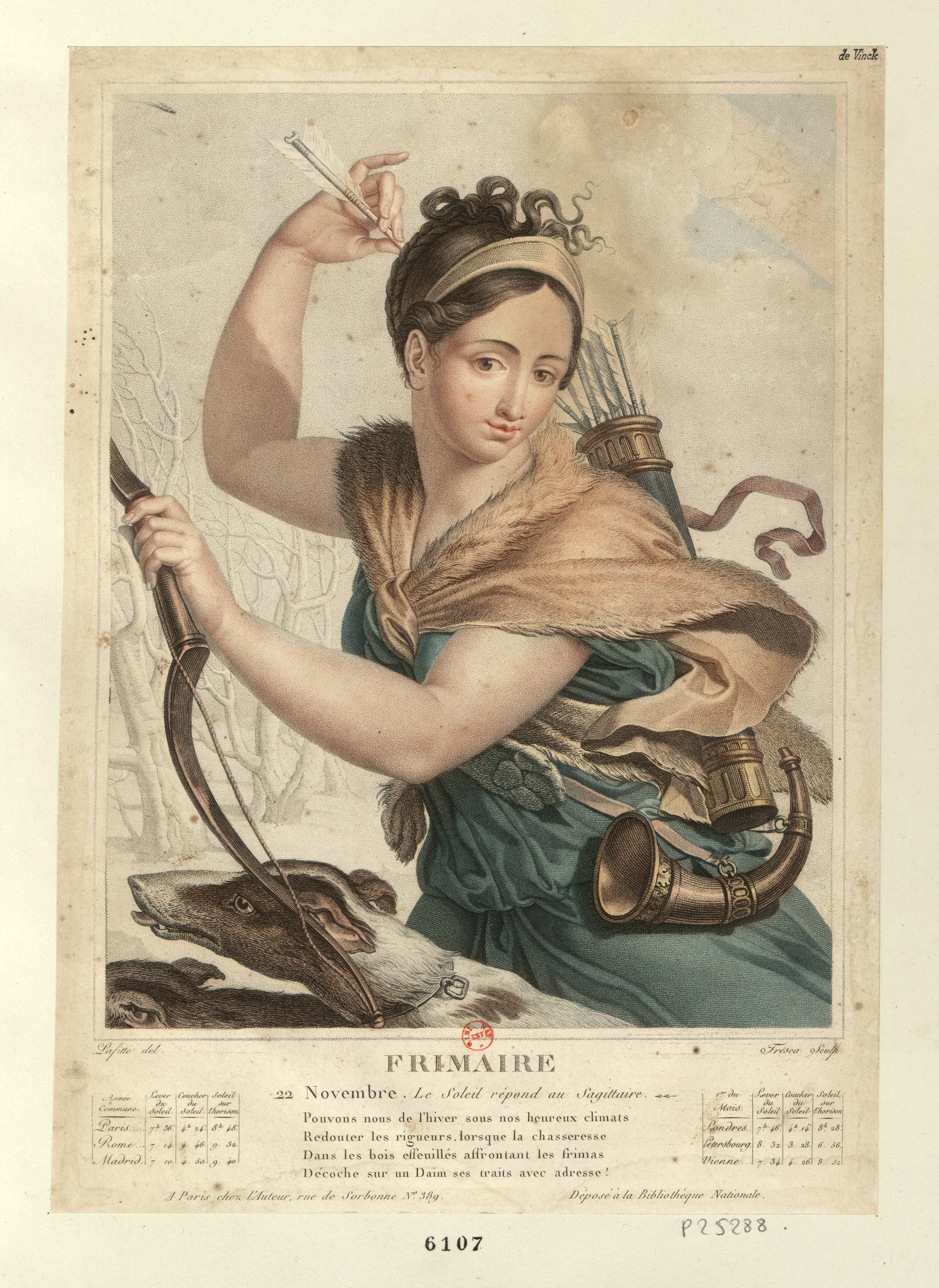
Frimaire

01:02:57
Time of day - 24 h/day
Greenwich

Year: 3
Month: Frimaire
Year: III

Day of the 10-day
week (décade)
Primidi
Duodi
Tridi
Quartidi
Quintidi
Sextidi
Septidi
Octidi
Nonidi
Décadi

décade 7
1	Friday; 21 November 1794
2	Saturday; 22 November 1794
3	Sunday; 23 November 1794
4	Monday; 24 November 1794
5	Tuesday; 25 November 1794
6	Wednesday; 26 November 1794
7	Thursday; 27 November 1794
8	Friday; 28 November 1794
9	Saturday; 29 November 1794
10	Sunday; 30 November 1794

décade 8
11	Monday; 1 December 1794
12	Tuesday; 2 December 1794
13	Wednesday; 3 December 1794
14	Thursday; 4 December 1794
15	Friday; 5 December 1794
16	Saturday; 6 December 1794
17	Sunday; 7 December 1794
18	Monday; 8 December 1794
19	Tuesday; 9 December 1794
20	Wednesday; 10 December 1794

décade 9
21	Thursday; 11 December 1794
22	Friday; 12 December 1794
23	Saturday; 13 December 1794
24	Sunday; 14 December 1794
25	Monday; 15 December 1794
26	Tuesday; 16 December 1794
27	Wednesday; 17 December 1794
28	Thursday; 18 December 1794
29	Friday; 19 December 1794
30	Saturday; 20 December 1794

Decimal time – 10 h/day
Paris
0:43:71

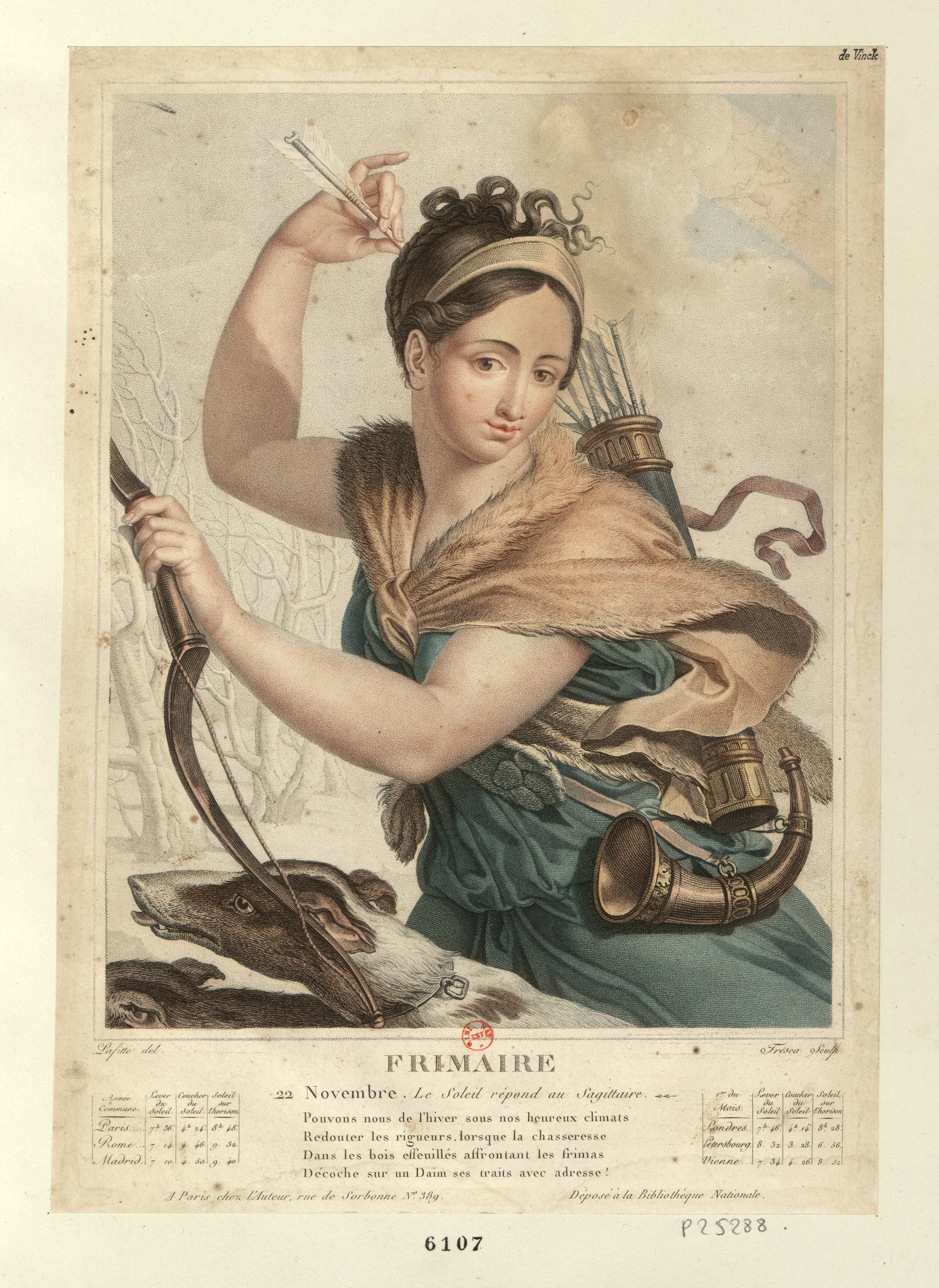
Frimaire

01:02:57
Time of day - 24 h/day
Greenwich

Year: 4
Month: Frimaire
Year: IV

Day of the 10-day
week (décade)
Primidi
Duodi
Tridi
Quartidi
Quintidi
Sextidi
Septidi
Octidi
Nonidi
Décadi

décade 7
1	Sunday; 22 November 1795
2	Monday; 23 November 1795
3	Tuesday; 24 November 1795
4	Wednesday; 25 November 1795
5	Thursday; 26 November 1795
6	Friday; 27 November 1795
7	Saturday; 28 November 1795
8	Sunday; 29 November 1795
9	Monday; 30 November 1795
10	Tuesday; 1 December 1795

décade 8
11	Wednesday; 2 December 1795
12	Thursday; 3 December 1795
13	Friday; 4 December 1795
14	Saturday; 5 December 1795
15	Sunday; 6 December 1795
16	Monday; 7 December 1795
17	Tuesday; 8 December 1795
18	Wednesday; 9 December 1795
19	Thursday; 10 December 1795
20	Friday; 11 December 1795

décade 9
21	Saturday; 12 December 1795
22	Sunday; 13 December 1795
23	Monday; 14 December 1795
24	Tuesday; 15 December 1795
25	Wednesday; 16 December 1795
26	Thursday; 17 December 1795
27	Friday; 18 December 1795
28	Saturday; 19 December 1795
29	Sunday; 20 December 1795
30	Monday; 21 December 1795

Decimal time – 10 h/day
Paris
0:43:71

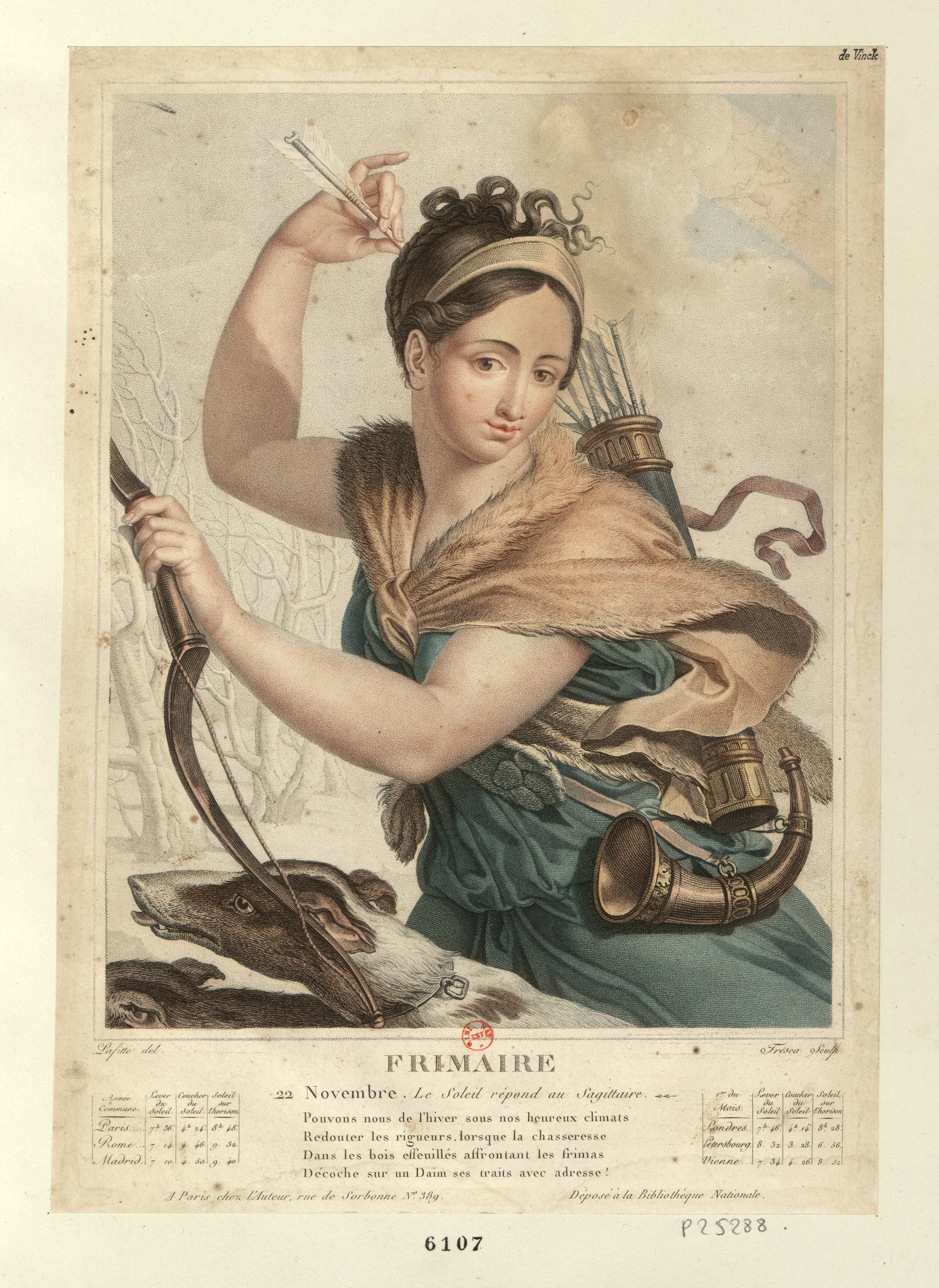
Frimaire

01:02:57
Time of day - 24 h/day
Greenwich

Year: 5
Month: Frimaire
Year: V

Day of the 10-day
week (décade)
Primidi
Duodi
Tridi
Quartidi
Quintidi
Sextidi
Septidi
Octidi
Nonidi
Décadi

décade 7
1	Monday; 21 November 1796
2	Tuesday; 22 November 1796
3	Wednesday; 23 November 1796
4	Thursday; 24 November 1796
5	Friday; 25 November 1796
6	Saturday; 26 November 1796
7	Sunday; 27 November 1796
8	Monday; 28 November 1796
9	Tuesday; 29 November 1796
10	Wednesday; 30 November 1796

décade 8
11	Thursday; 1 December 1796
12	Friday; 2 December 1796
13	Saturday; 3 December 1796
14	Sunday; 4 December 1796
15	Monday; 5 December 1796
16	Tuesday; 6 December 1796
17	Wednesday; 7 December 1796
18	Thursday; 8 December 1796
19	Friday; 9 December 1796
20	Saturday; 10 December 1796

décade 9
21	Sunday; 11 December 1796
22	Monday; 12 December 1796
23	Tuesday; 13 December 1796
24	Wednesday; 14 December 1796
25	Thursday; 15 December 1796
26	Friday; 16 December 1796
27	Saturday; 17 December 1796
28	Sunday; 18 December 1796
29	Monday; 19 December 1796
30	Tuesday; 20 December 1796

Decimal time – 10 h/day
Paris
0:43:71

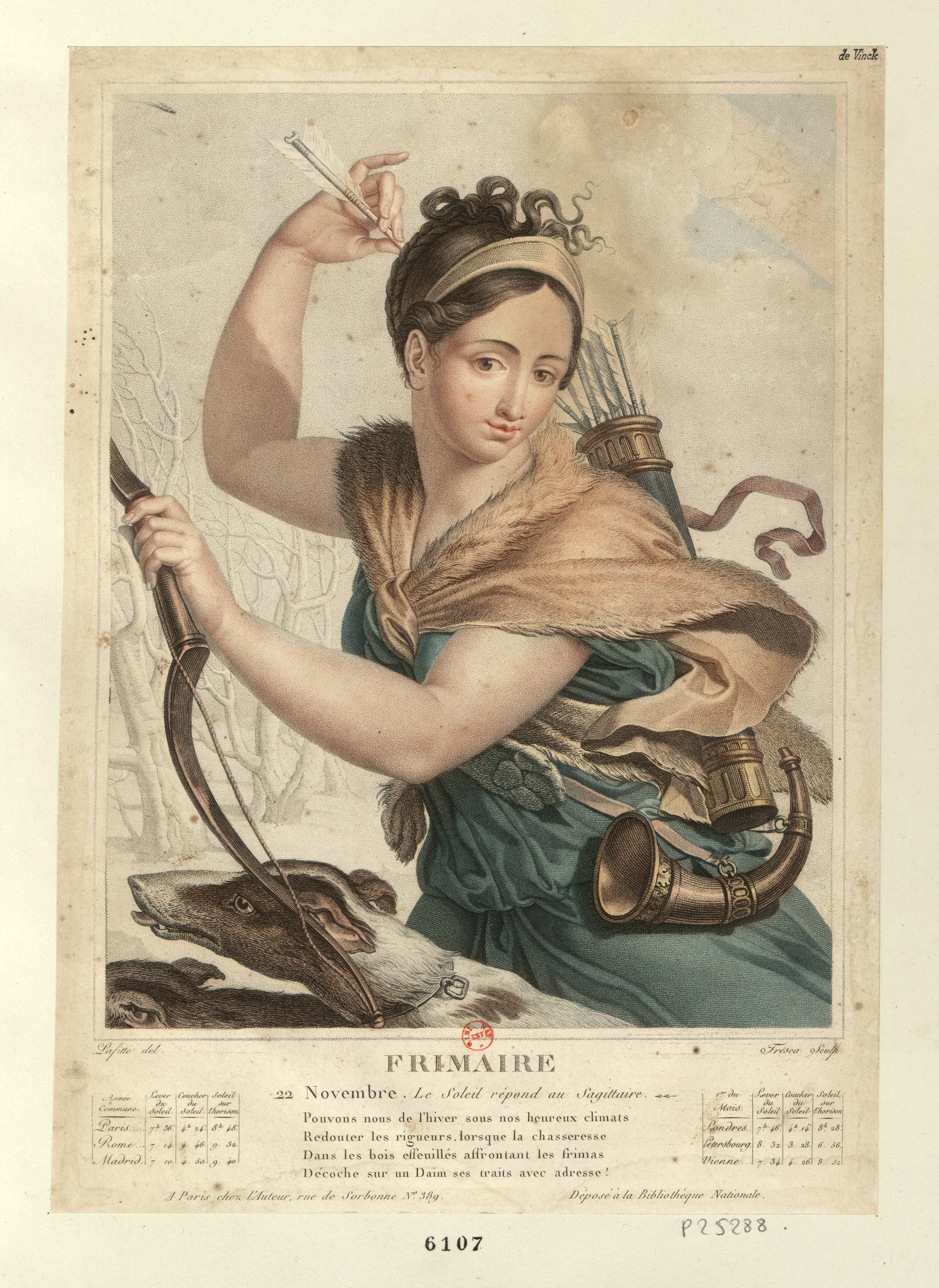
Frimaire

01:02:57
Time of day - 24 h/day
Greenwich

Year: 6
Month: Frimaire
Year: VI

Day of the 10-day
week (décade)
Primidi
Duodi
Tridi
Quartidi
Quintidi
Sextidi
Septidi
Octidi
Nonidi
Décadi

décade 7
1	Tuesday; 21 November 1797
2	Wednesday; 22 November 1797
3	Thursday; 23 November 1797
4	Friday; 24 November 1797
5	Saturday; 25 November 1797
6	Sunday; 26 November 1797
7	Monday; 27 November 1797
8	Tuesday; 28 November 1797
9	Wednesday; 29 November 1797
10	Thursday; 30 November 1797

décade 8
11	Friday; 1 December 1797
12	Saturday; 2 December 1797
13	Sunday; 3 December 1797
14	Monday; 4 December 1797
15	Tuesday; 5 December 1797
16	Wednesday; 6 December 1797
17	Thursday; 7 December 1797
18	Friday; 8 December 1797
19	Saturday; 9 December 1797
20	Sunday; 10 December 1797

décade 9
21	Monday; 11 December 1797
22	Tuesday; 12 December 1797
23	Wednesday; 13 December 1797
24	Thursday; 14 December 1797
25	Friday; 15 December 1797
26	Saturday; 16 December 1797
27	Sunday; 17 December 1797
28	Monday; 18 December 1797
29	Tuesday; 19 December 1797
30	Wednesday; 20 December 1797

Decimal time – 10 h/day
Paris
0:43:71

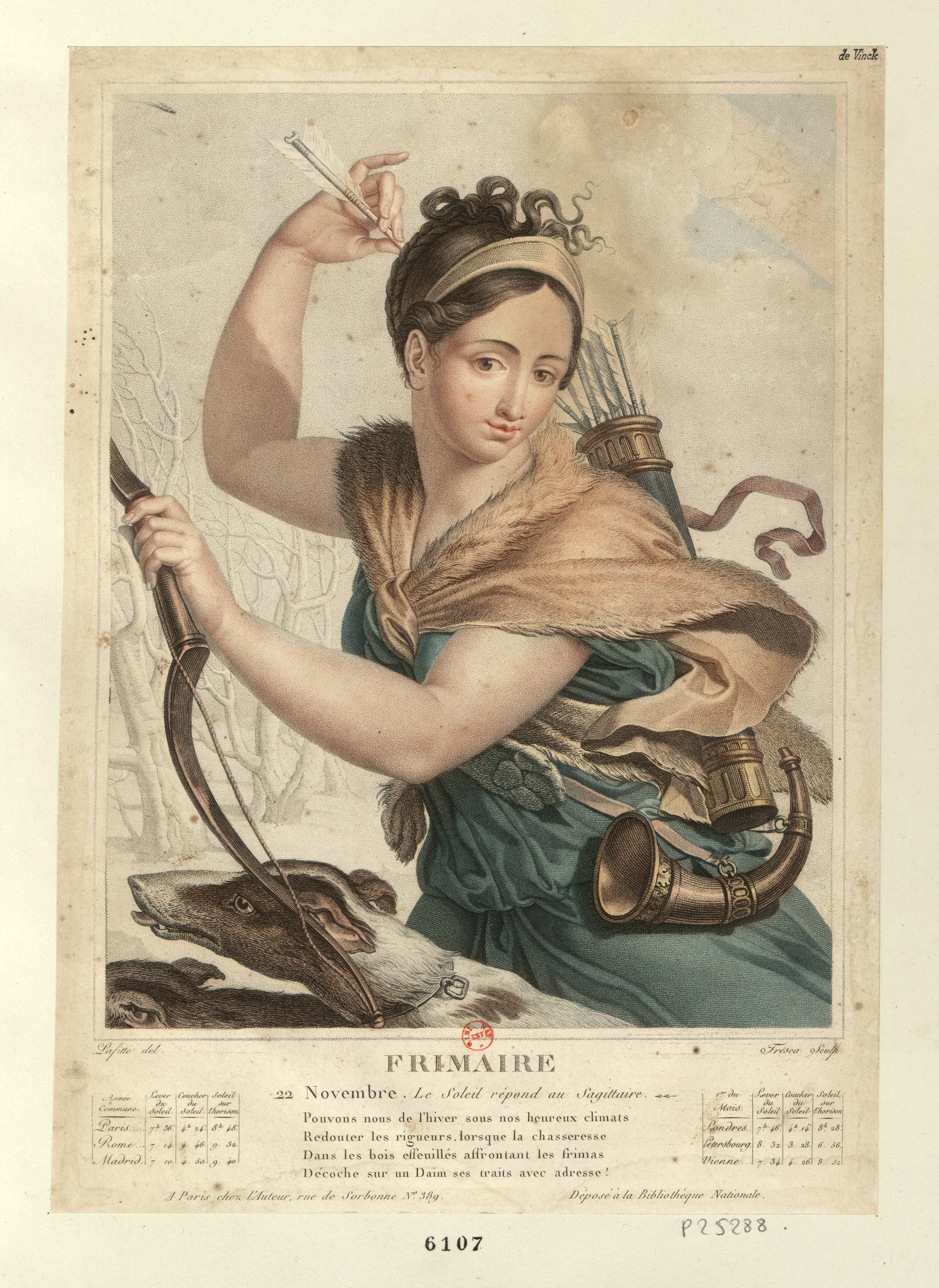
Frimaire

01:02:57
Time of day - 24 h/day
Greenwich

Year: 7
Month: Frimaire
Year: VII

Day of the 10-day
week (décade)
Primidi
Duodi
Tridi
Quartidi
Quintidi
Sextidi
Septidi
Octidi
Nonidi
Décadi

décade 7
1	Wednesday; 21 November 1798
2	Thursday; 22 November 1798
3	Friday; 23 November 1798
4	Saturday; 24 November 1798
5	Sunday; 25 November 1798
6	Monday; 26 November 1798
7	Tuesday; 27 November 1798
8	Wednesday; 28 November 1798
9	Thursday; 29 November 1798
10	Friday; 30 November 1798

décade 8
11	Saturday; 1 December 1798
12	Sunday; 2 December 1798
13	Monday; 3 December 1798
14	Tuesday; 4 December 1798
15	Wednesday; 5 December 1798
16	Thursday; 6 December 1798
17	Friday; 7 December 1798
18	Saturday; 8 December 1798
19	Sunday; 9 December 1798
20	Monday; 10 December 1798

décade 9
21	Tuesday; 11 December 1798
22	Wednesday; 12 December 1798
23	Thursday; 13 December 1798
24	Friday; 14 December 1798
25	Saturday; 15 December 1798
26	Sunday; 16 December 1798
27	Monday; 17 December 1798
28	Tuesday; 18 December 1798
29	Wednesday; 19 December 1798
30	Thursday; 20 December 1798

Decimal time – 10 h/day
Paris
0:43:71

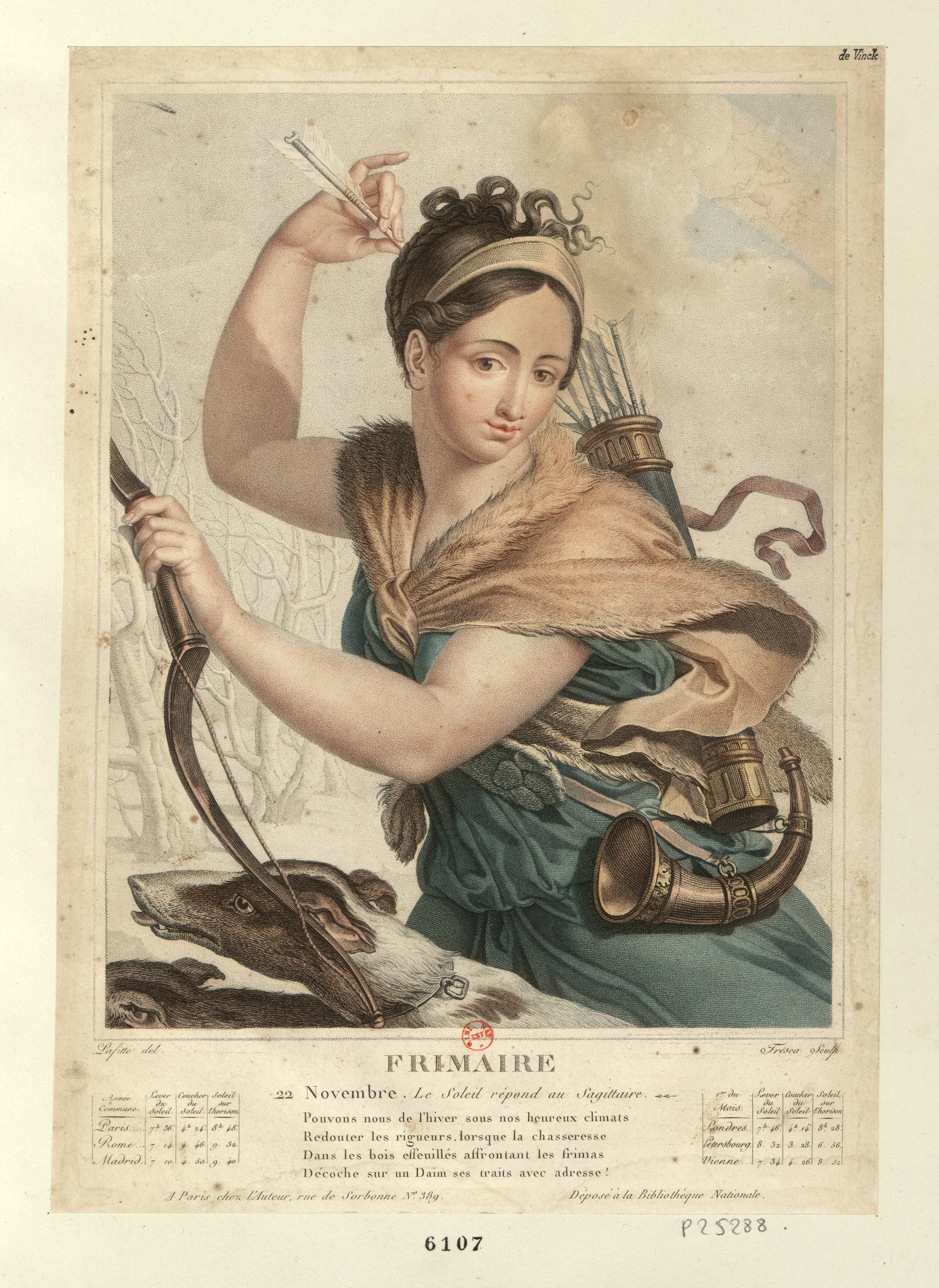
Frimaire

01:02:57
Time of day - 24 h/day
Greenwich

Year: 8
Month: Frimaire
Year: VIII

Day of the 10-day
week (décade)
Primidi
Duodi
Tridi
Quartidi
Quintidi
Sextidi
Septidi
Octidi
Nonidi
Décadi

décade 7
1	Friday; 22 November 1799
2	Saturday; 23 November 1799
3	Sunday; 24 November 1799
4	Monday; 25 November 1799
5	Tuesday; 26 November 1799
6	Wednesday; 27 November 1799
7	Thursday; 28 November 1799
8	Friday; 29 November 1799
9	Saturday; 30 November 1799
10	Sunday; 1 December 1799

décade 8
11	Monday; 2 December 1799
12	Tuesday; 3 December 1799
13	Wednesday; 4 December 1799
14	Thursday; 5 December 1799
15	Friday; 6 December 1799
16	Saturday; 7 December 1799
17	Sunday; 8 December 1799
18	Monday; 9 December 1799
19	Tuesday; 10 December 1799
20	Wednesday; 11 December 1799

décade 9
21	Thursday; 12 December 1799
22	Friday; 13 December 1799
23	Saturday; 14 December 1799
24	Sunday; 15 December 1799
25	Monday; 16 December 1799
26	Tuesday; 17 December 1799
27	Wednesday; 18 December 1799
28	Thursday; 19 December 1799
29	Friday; 20 December 1799
30	Saturday; 21 December 1799

Decimal time – 10 h/day
Paris
0:43:71

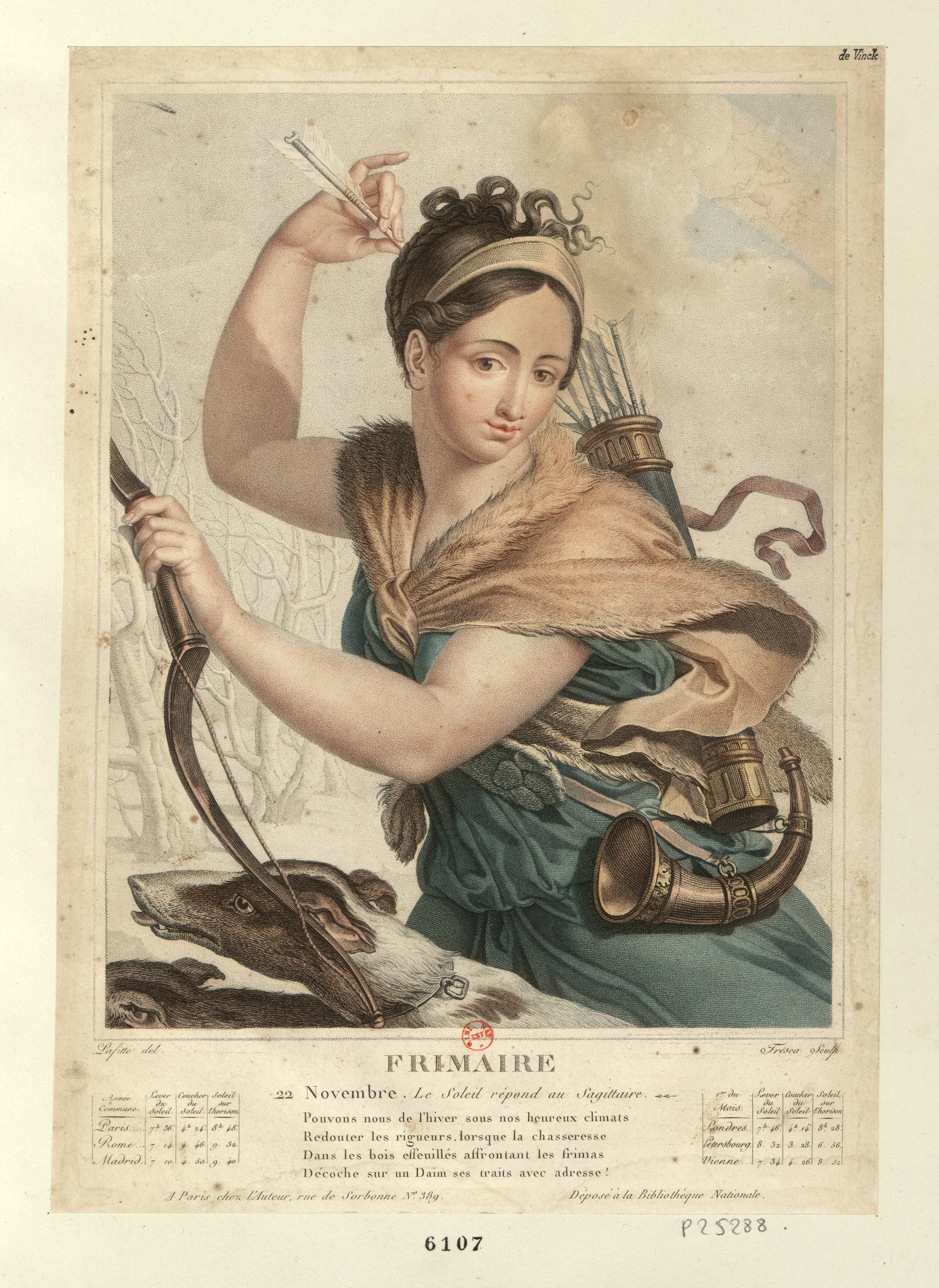
Frimaire

01:02:57
Time of day - 24 h/day
Greenwich

Year: 9
Month: Frimaire
Year: IX

Day of the 10-day
week (décade)
Primidi
Duodi
Tridi
Quartidi
Quintidi
Sextidi
Septidi
Octidi
Nonidi
Décadi

décade 7
1	Saturday; 22 November 1800
2	Sunday; 23 November 1800
3	Monday; 24 November 1800
4	Tuesday; 25 November 1800
5	Wednesday; 26 November 1800
6	Thursday; 27 November 1800
7	Friday; 28 November 1800
8	Saturday; 29 November 1800
9	Sunday; 30 November 1800
10	Monday; 1 December 1800

décade 8
11	Tuesday; 2 December 1800
12	Wednesday; 3 December 1800
13	Thursday; 4 December 1800
14	Friday; 5 December 1800
15	Saturday; 6 December 1800
16	Sunday; 7 December 1800
17	Monday; 8 December 1800
18	Tuesday; 9 December 1800
19	Wednesday; 10 December 1800
20	Thursday; 11 December 1800

décade 9
21	Friday; 12 December 1800
22	Saturday; 13 December 1800
23	Sunday; 14 December 1800
24	Monday; 15 December 1800
25	Tuesday; 16 December 1800
26	Wednesday; 17 December 1800
27	Thursday; 18 December 1800
28	Friday; 19 December 1800
29	Saturday; 20 December 1800
30	Sunday; 21 December 1800

Decimal time – 10 h/day
Paris
0:43:71

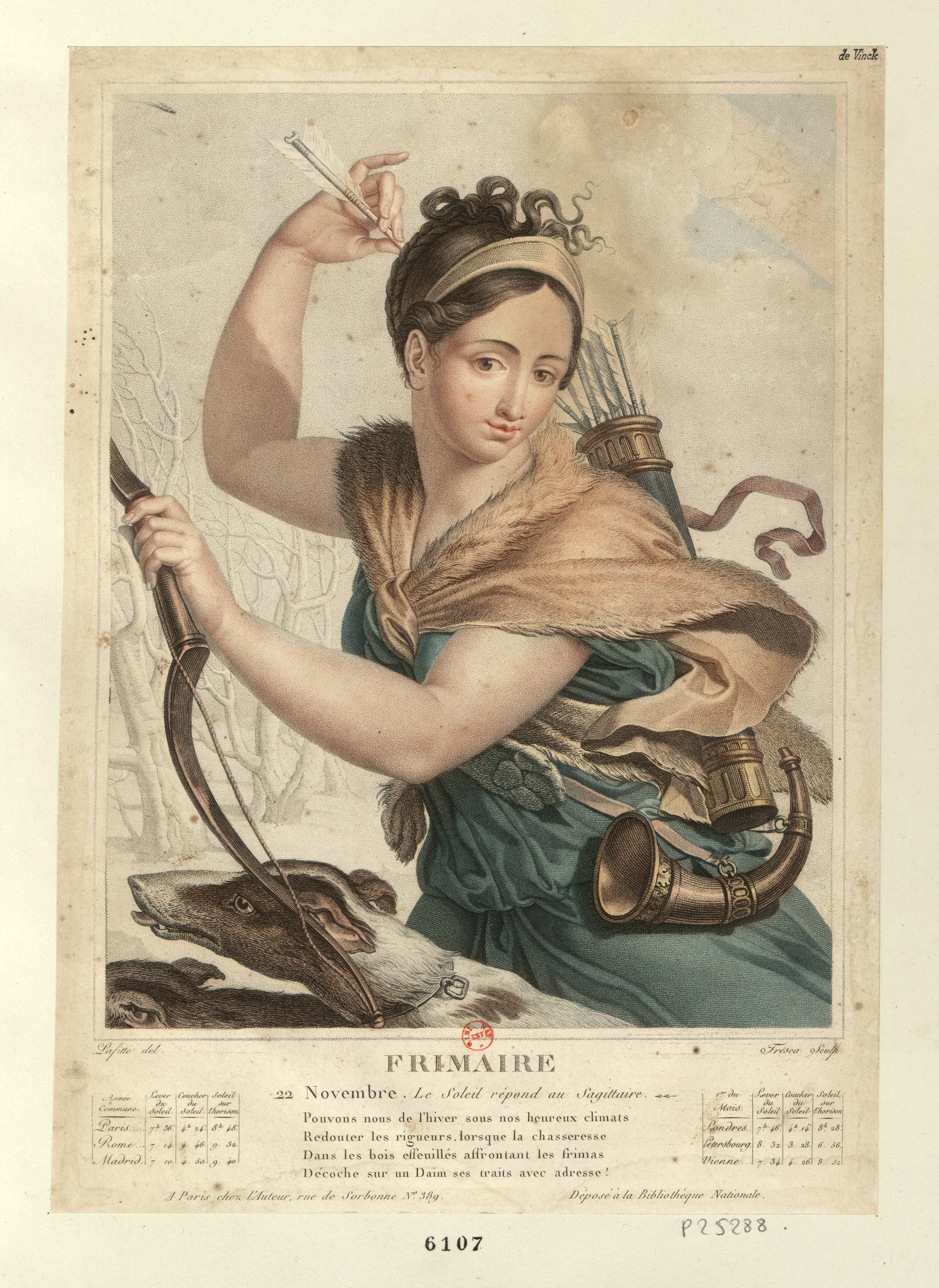
Frimaire

01:02:57
Time of day - 24 h/day
Greenwich

Year: 10
Month: Frimaire
Year: X

Day of the 10-day
week (décade)
Primidi
Duodi
Tridi
Quartidi
Quintidi
Sextidi
Septidi
Octidi
Nonidi
Décadi

décade 7
1	Sunday; 22 November 1801
2	Monday; 23 November 1801
3	Tuesday; 24 November 1801
4	Wednesday; 25 November 1801
5	Thursday; 26 November 1801
6	Friday; 27 November 1801
7	Saturday; 28 November 1801
8	Sunday; 29 November 1801
9	Monday; 30 November 1801
10	Tuesday; 1 December 1801

décade 8
11	Wednesday; 2 December 1801
12	Thursday; 3 December 1801
13	Friday; 4 December 1801
14	Saturday; 5 December 1801
15	Sunday; 6 December 1801
16	Monday; 7 December 1801
17	Tuesday; 8 December 1801
18	Wednesday; 9 December 1801
19	Thursday; 10 December 1801
20	Friday; 11 December 1801

décade 9
21	Saturday; 12 December 1801
22	Sunday; 13 December 1801
23	Monday; 14 December 1801
24	Tuesday; 15 December 1801
25	Wednesday; 16 December 1801
26	Thursday; 17 December 1801
27	Friday; 18 December 1801
28	Saturday; 19 December 1801
29	Sunday; 20 December 1801
30	Monday; 21 December 1801

Decimal time – 10 h/day
Paris
0:43:71

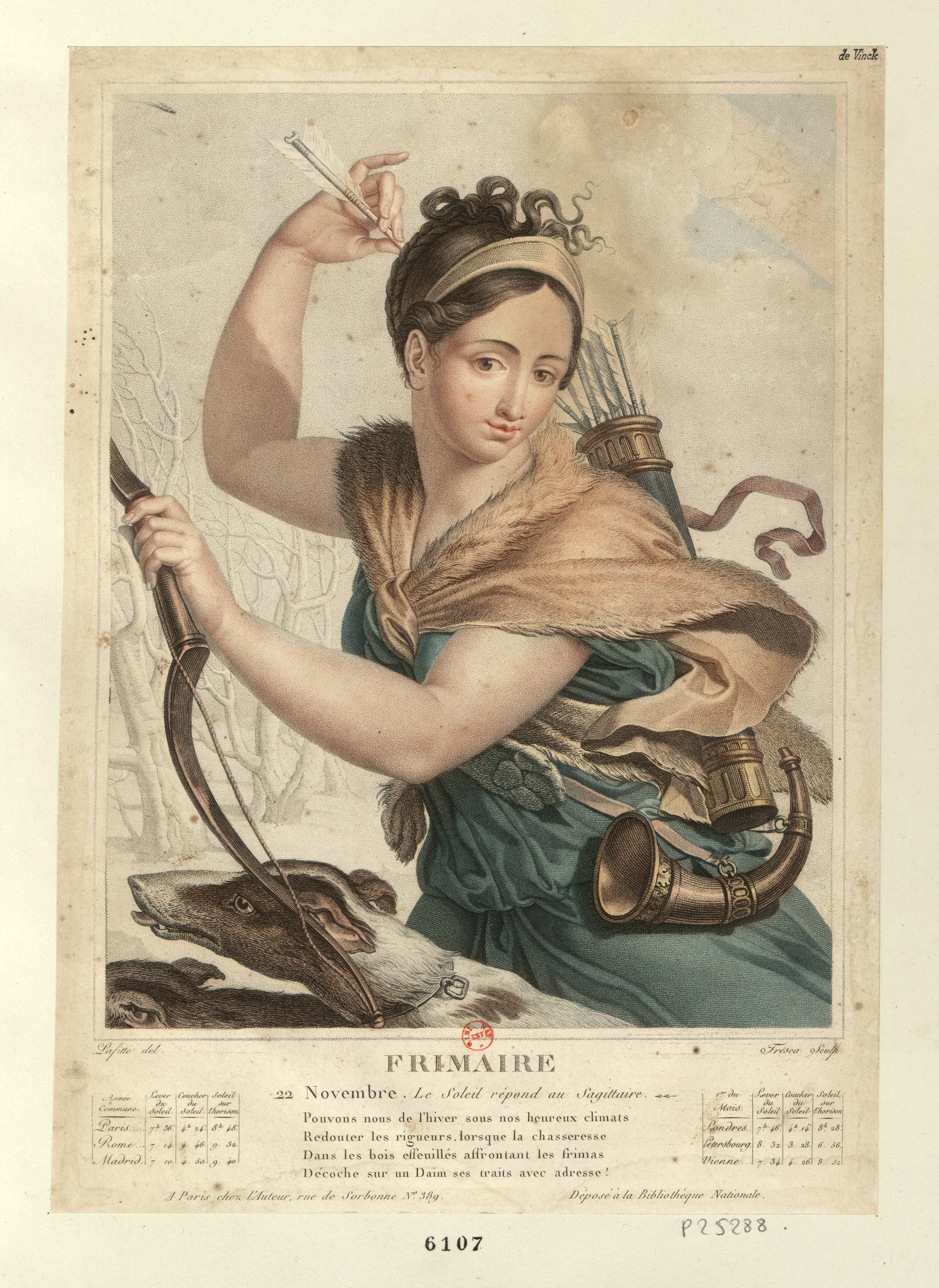
Frimaire

01:02:57
Time of day - 24 h/day
Greenwich

Year: 11
Month: Frimaire
Year: XI

Day of the 10-day
week (décade)
Primidi
Duodi
Tridi
Quartidi
Quintidi
Sextidi
Septidi
Octidi
Nonidi
Décadi

décade 7
1	Monday; 22 November 1802
2	Tuesday; 23 November 1802
3	Wednesday; 24 November 1802
4	Thursday; 25 November 1802
5	Friday; 26 November 1802
6	Saturday; 27 November 1802
7	Sunday; 28 November 1802
8	Monday; 29 November 1802
9	Tuesday; 30 November 1802
10	Wednesday; 1 December 1802

décade 8
11	Thursday; 2 December 1802
12	Friday; 3 December 1802
13	Saturday; 4 December 1802
14	Sunday; 5 December 1802
15	Monday; 6 December 1802
16	Tuesday; 7 December 1802
17	Wednesday; 8 December 1802
18	Thursday; 9 December 1802
19	Friday; 10 December 1802
20	Saturday; 11 December 1802

décade 9
21	Sunday; 12 December 1802
22	Monday; 13 December 1802
23	Tuesday; 14 December 1802
24	Wednesday; 15 December 1802
25	Thursday; 16 December 1802
26	Friday; 17 December 1802
27	Saturday; 18 December 1802
28	Sunday; 19 December 1802
29	Monday; 20 December 1802
30	Tuesday; 21 December 1802

Decimal time – 10 h/day
Paris
0:43:71

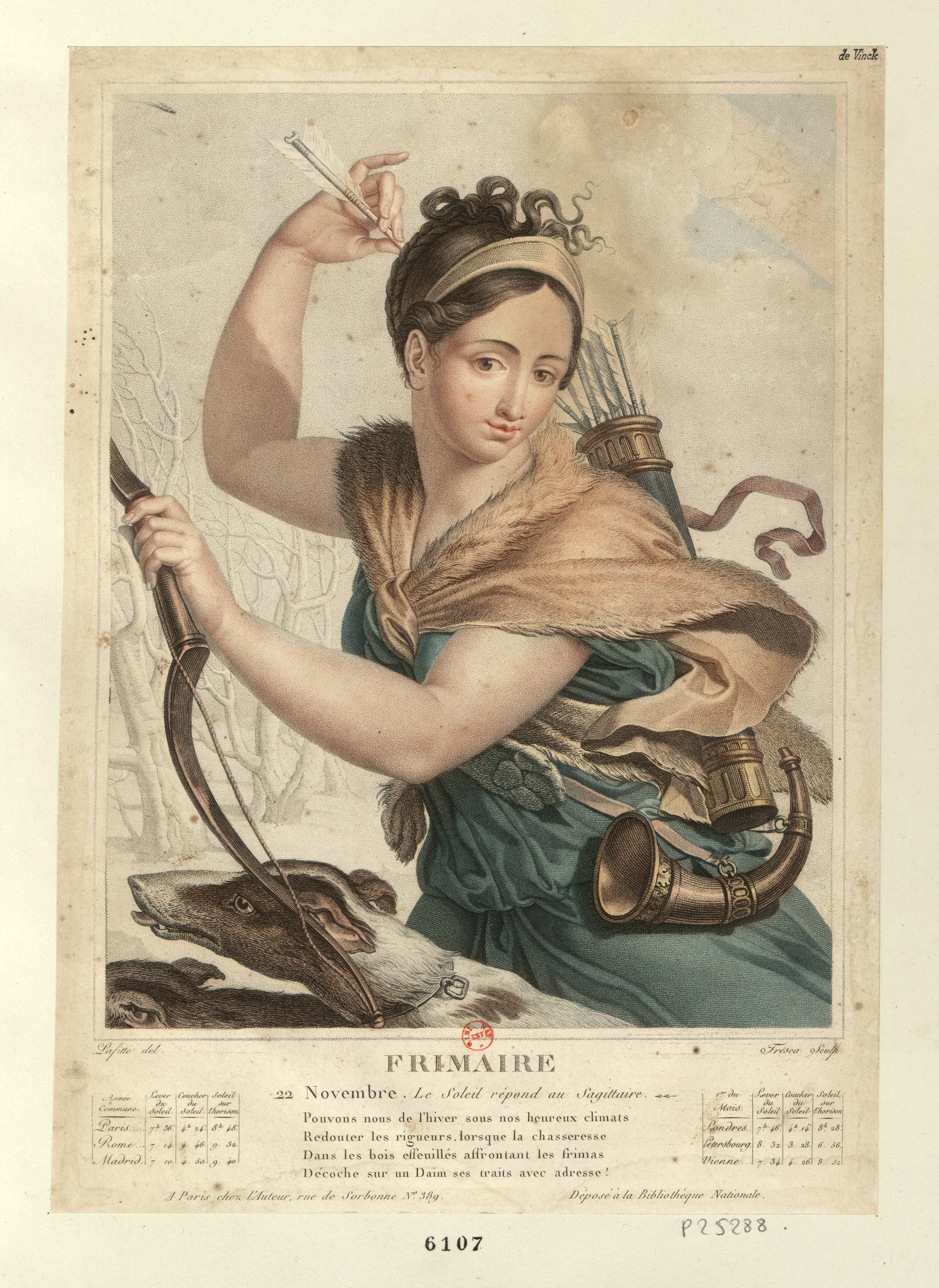
Frimaire

01:02:57
Time of day - 24 h/day
Greenwich

Year: 12
Month: Frimaire
Year: XII

Day of the 10-day
week (décade)
Primidi
Duodi
Tridi
Quartidi
Quintidi
Sextidi
Septidi
Octidi
Nonidi
Décadi

décade 7
1	Wednesday; 23 November 1803
2	Thursday; 24 November 1803
3	Friday; 25 November 1803
4	Saturday; 26 November 1803
5	Sunday; 27 November 1803
6	Monday; 28 November 1803
7	Tuesday; 29 November 1803
8	Wednesday; 30 November 1803
9	Thursday; 1 December 1803
10	Friday; 2 December 1803

décade 8
11	Saturday; 3 December 1803
12	Sunday; 4 December 1803
13	Monday; 5 December 1803
14	Tuesday; 6 December 1803
15	Wednesday; 7 December 1803
16	Thursday; 8 December 1803
17	Friday; 9 December 1803
18	Saturday; 10 December 1803
19	Sunday; 11 December 1803
20	Monday; 12 December 1803

décade 9
21	Tuesday; 13 December 1803
22	Wednesday; 14 December 1803
23	Thursday; 15 December 1803
24	Friday; 16 December 1803
25	Saturday; 17 December 1803
26	Sunday; 18 December 1803
27	Monday; 19 December 1803
28	Tuesday; 20 December 1803
29	Wednesday; 21 December 1803
30	Thursday; 22 December 1803

Decimal time – 10 h/day
Paris
0:43:71

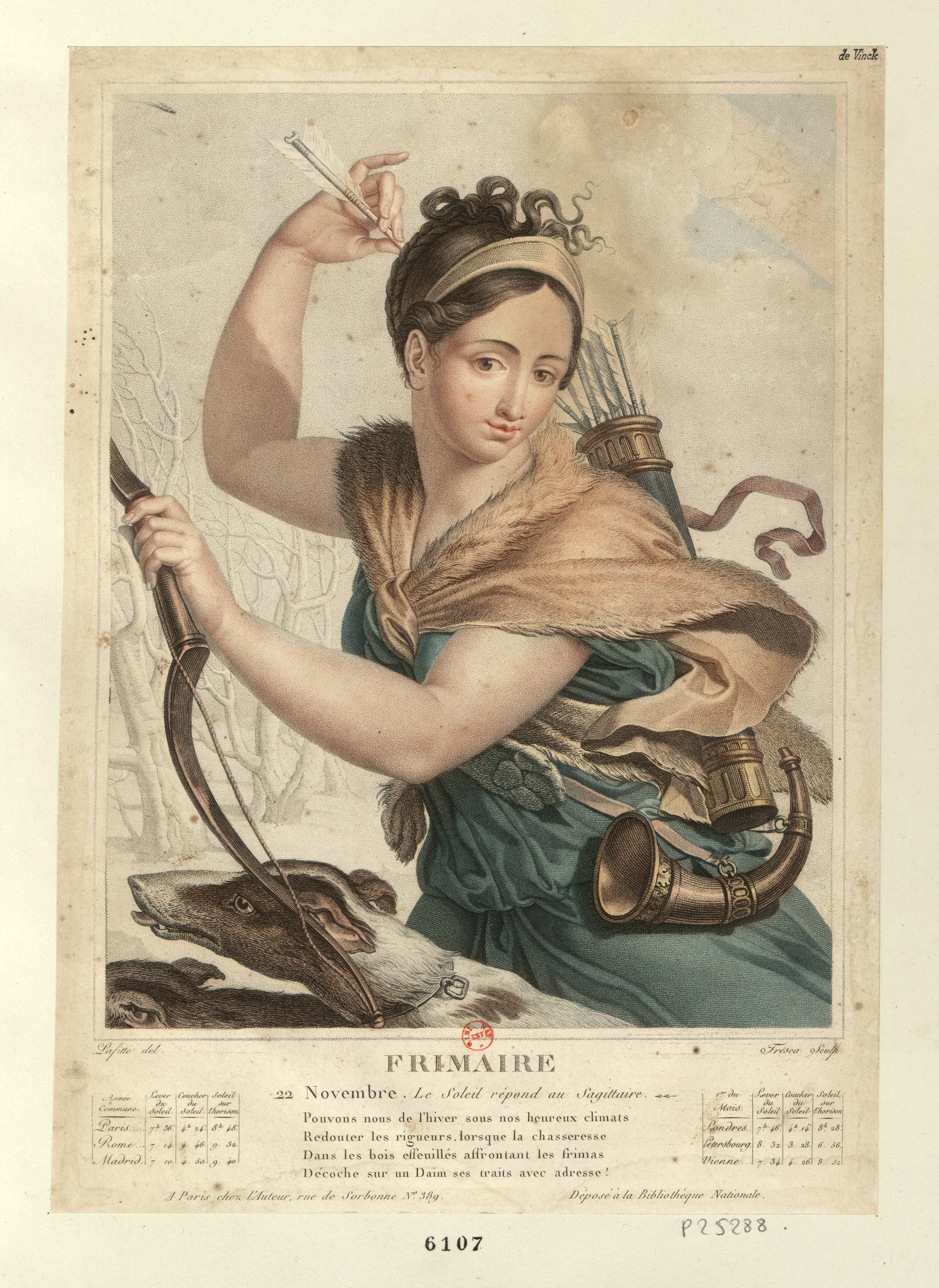
Frimaire

01:02:57
Time of day - 24 h/day
Greenwich

Year: 13
Month: Frimaire
Year: XIII

Day of the 10-day
week (décade)
Primidi
Duodi
Tridi
Quartidi
Quintidi
Sextidi
Septidi
Octidi
Nonidi
Décadi

décade 7
1	Thursday; 22 November 1804
2	Friday; 23 November 1804
3	Saturday; 24 November 1804
4	Sunday; 25 November 1804
5	Monday; 26 November 1804
6	Tuesday; 27 November 1804
7	Wednesday; 28 November 1804
8	Thursday; 29 November 1804
9	Friday; 30 November 1804
10	Saturday; 1 December 1804

décade 8
11	Sunday; 2 December 1804
12	Monday; 3 December 1804
13	Tuesday; 4 December 1804
14	Wednesday; 5 December 1804
15	Thursday; 6 December 1804
16	Friday; 7 December 1804
17	Saturday; 8 December 1804
18	Sunday; 9 December 1804
19	Monday; 10 December 1804
20	Tuesday; 11 December 1804

décade 9
21	Wednesday; 12 December 1804
22	Thursday; 13 December 1804
23	Friday; 14 December 1804
24	Saturday; 15 December 1804
25	Sunday; 16 December 1804
26	Monday; 17 December 1804
27	Tuesday; 18 December 1804
28	Wednesday; 19 December 1804
29	Thursday; 20 December 1804
30	Friday; 21 December 1804

Decimal time – 10 h/day
Paris
0:43:71

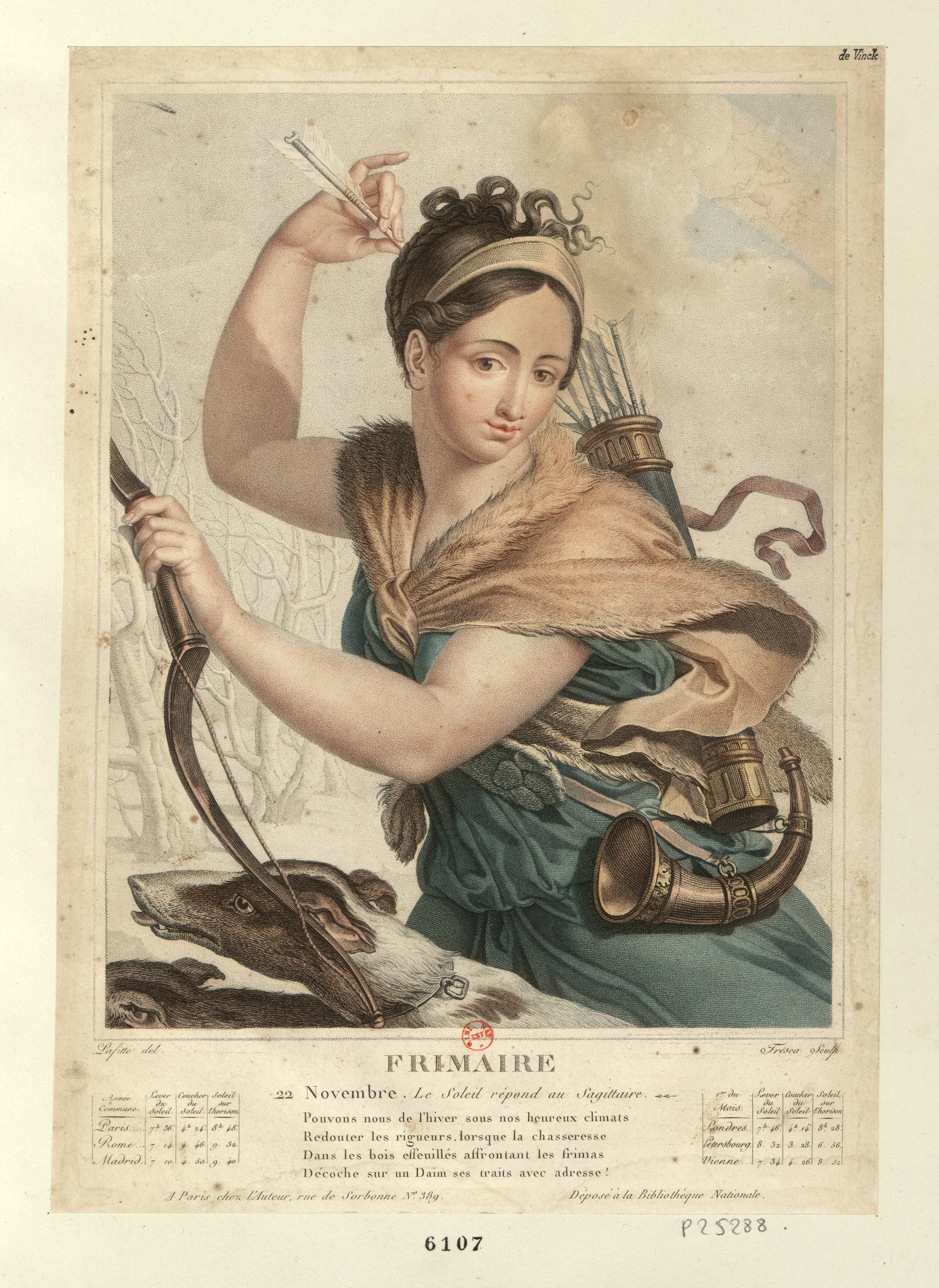
Frimaire

01:02:57
Time of day - 24 h/day
Greenwich

Year: 14
Month: Frimaire
Year: XIV

Day of the 10-day
week (décade)
Primidi
Duodi
Tridi
Quartidi
Quintidi
Sextidi
Septidi
Octidi
Nonidi
Décadi

décade 7
1	Friday; 22 November 1805
2	Saturday; 23 November 1805
3	Sunday; 24 November 1805
4	Monday; 25 November 1805
5	Tuesday; 26 November 1805
6	Wednesday; 27 November 1805
7	Thursday; 28 November 1805
8	Friday; 29 November 1805
9	Saturday; 30 November 1805
10	Sunday; 1 December 1805

décade 8
11	Monday; 2 December 1805
12	Tuesday; 3 December 1805
13	Wednesday; 4 December 1805
14	Thursday; 5 December 1805
15	Friday; 6 December 1805
16	Saturday; 7 December 1805
17	Sunday; 8 December 1805
18	Monday; 9 December 1805
19	Tuesday; 10 December 1805
20	Wednesday; 11 December 1805

décade 9
21	Thursday; 12 December 1805
22	Friday; 13 December 1805
23	Saturday; 14 December 1805
24	Sunday; 15 December 1805
25	Monday; 16 December 1805
26	Tuesday; 17 December 1805
27	Wednesday; 18 December 1805
28	Thursday; 19 December 1805
29	Friday; 20 December 1805
30	Saturday; 21 December 1805

Decimal time – 10 h/day
Paris
0:43:71

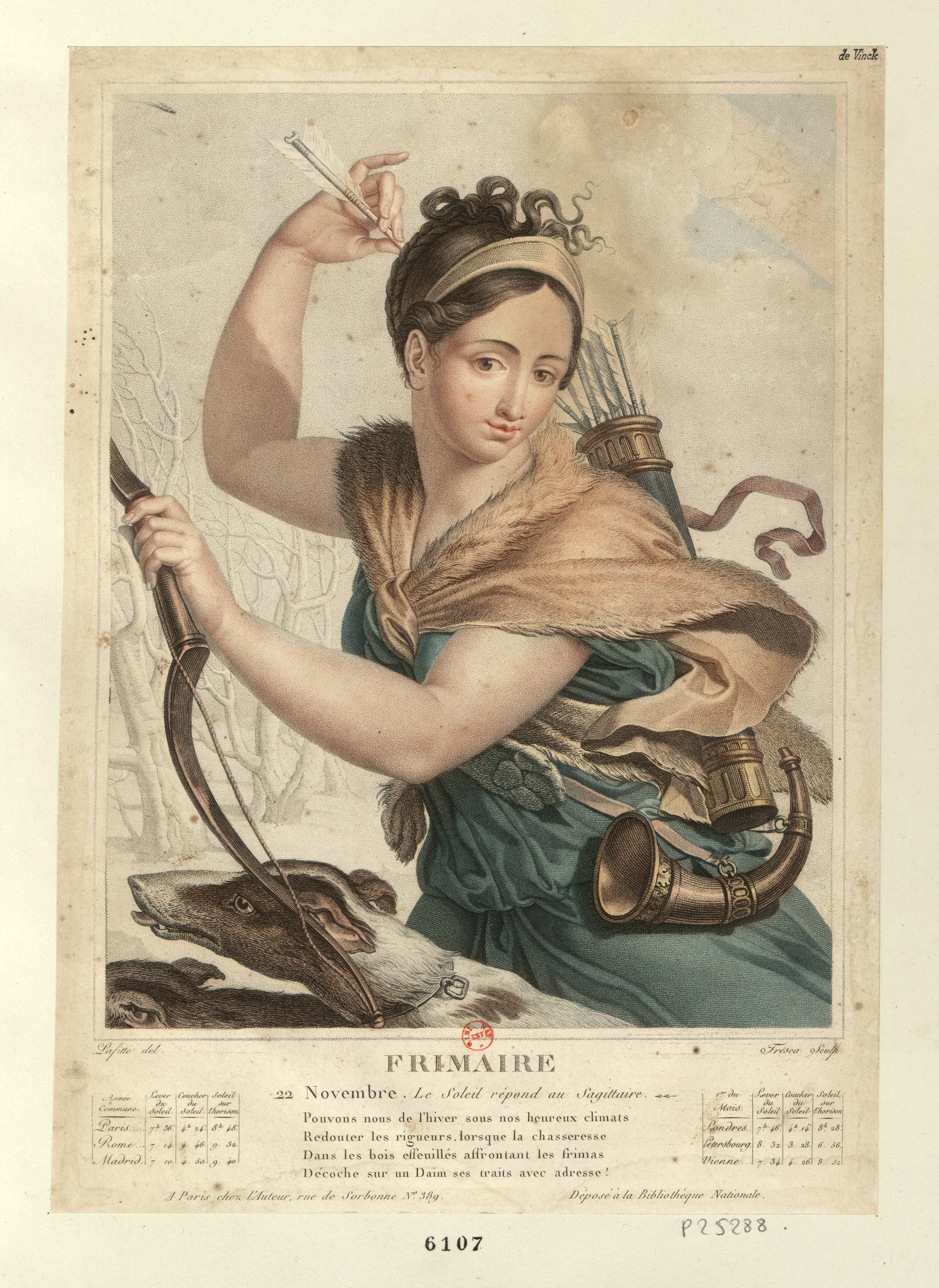
Frimaire

01:02:57
Time of day - 24 h/day
Greenwich

== Day name table ==
Like all FRC months, Frimaire lasted 30 days and was divided into three 10-day weeks called décades (decades). Every day had the name of an agricultural plant, except the 5th (Quintidi) and 10th day (Decadi) of every decade, which had the name of a domestic animal (Quintidi) or an agricultural tool (Decadi).

Other exceptions are the 8th day (Honey) and the 11th day (Wax). The original proposal of Fabre d'Églantine was Epicéa (Spruce) for the 8th and Thuya (White Cedar) for the 11th, but the National Convention shifted Honey and Wax from Nivôse to Frimaire thus foiling the original intention.

	1^{re} Décade		2^{e} Décade		3^{e} Décade	
Primidi	1.	Raiponce (Rampion)	11.	Cire (Wax)	21.	Érable sucre (Silver Maple)
Duodi	2.	Navet (Turnip)	12.	Raifort (Horseradish)	22.	Bruyère (Heather)
Tridi	3.	Chicorée (Chicory)	13.	Cèdre (Cedar)	23.	Roseau (Reed)
Quartidi	4.	Nèfle (Medlar)	14.	Sapin (Fir)	24.	Oseille (Sorrel)
Quintidi	5.	Cochon (Pig)	15.	Chevreuil (Roe)	25.	Grillon (Cricket)
Sextidi	6.	Mâche (Corn Salad)	16.	Ajonc (Gorse)	26.	Pignon (Pinenut)
Septidi	7.	Chou-fleur (Cauliflower)	17.	Cyprès (Cypress)	27.	Liège (Cork Oak)
Octidi	8.	Miel (Honey)	18.	Lierre (Ivy)	28.	Truffe (Truffle)
Nonidi	9.	Genièvre (Juniper)	19.	Sabine (Savin Juniper)	29.	Olive (Olive)
Decadi	10.	Pioche (Pick)	20.	Hoyau (Axe)	30.	Pelle (Shovel)

== Conversion table ==
Table for conversion between Republican and Gregorian Calendar for the month Frimaire
I. / II. / III. / V. / VI. / VII.
1	2	3	4	5	6	7	8	9	10	11	12	13	14	15	16	17	18	19	20	21	22	23	24	25	26	27	28	29	30
21	22	23	24	25	26	27	28	29	30	1	2	3	4	5	6	7	8	9	10	11	12	13	14	15	16	17	18	19	20
November										December																			
1792 / 1793 / 1794 / 1796 / 1797 / 1798
IV. / VIII. / IX. / X. / XI. / XIII. / XIV.
1	2	3	4	5	6	7	8	9	10	11	12	13	14	15	16	17	18	19	20	21	22	23	24	25	26	27	28	29	30
22	23	24	25	26	27	28	29	30	1	2	3	4	5	6	7	8	9	10	11	12	13	14	15	16	17	18	19	20	21
November									December																				
1795 / 1799 / 1800 / 1801 / 1802 / 1804 / 1805
XII.
1	2	3	4	5	6	7	8	9	10	11	12	13	14	15	16	17	18	19	20	21	22	23	24	25	26	27	28	29	30
23	24	25	26	27	28	29	30	1	2	3	4	5	6	7	8	9	10	11	12	13	14	15	16	17	18	19	20	21	22
November								December																					
1803
