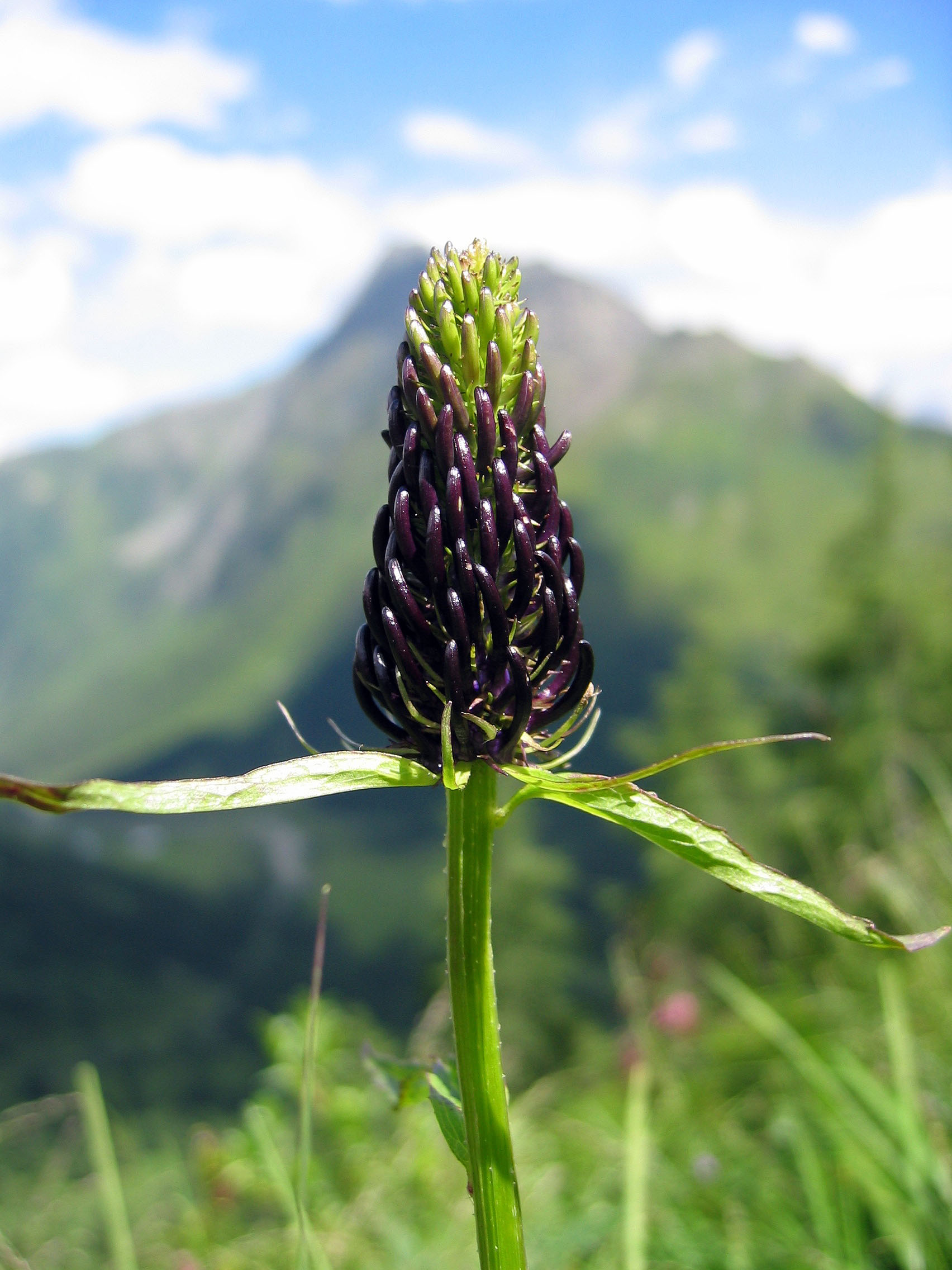
- Phyteuma ovatum, Austria

Scientific classification
- Kingdom: Plantae
- Clade: Tracheophytes
- Clade: Angiosperms
- Clade: Eudicots
- Clade: Asterids
- Order: Asterales
- Family: Campanulaceae
- Genus: Phyteuma
- Species: P. ovatum

Binomial name
- Phyteuma ovatum Honck.

Synonyms
- Phyteuma halleri All.

= Phyteuma ovatum =

Species of flowering plant

Phyteuma ovatum is a flowering plant in the family Campanulaceae.
