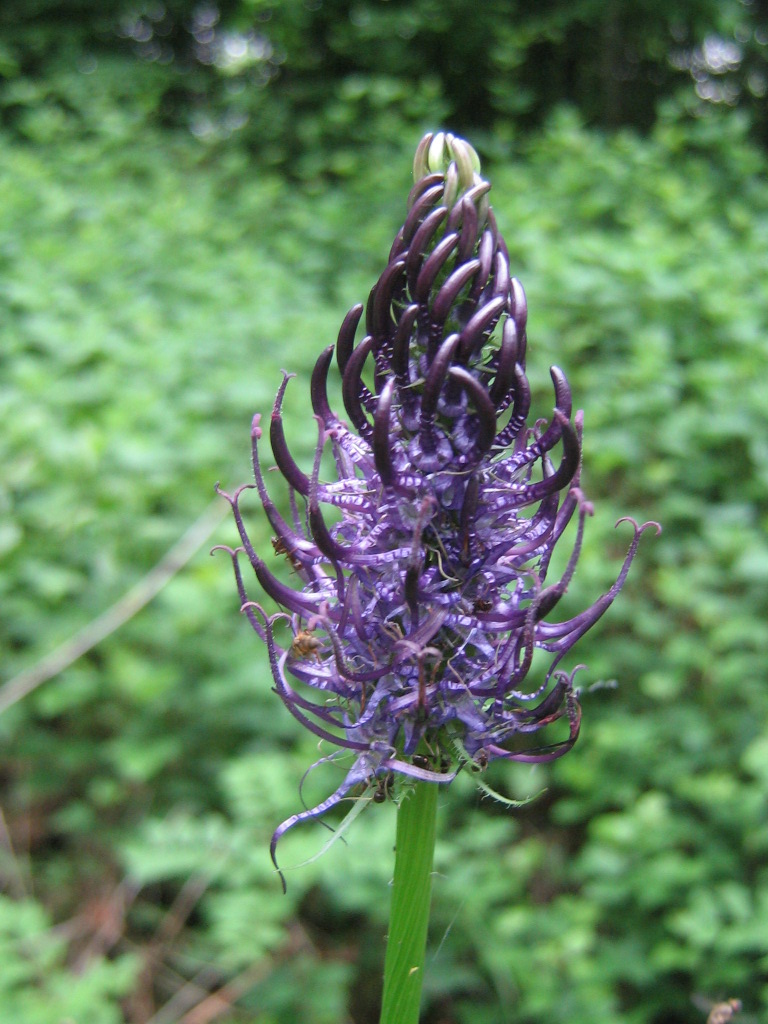

Scientific classification
- Kingdom: Plantae
- Clade: Tracheophytes
- Clade: Angiosperms
- Clade: Eudicots
- Clade: Asterids
- Order: Asterales
- Family: Campanulaceae
- Genus: Phyteuma
- Species: P. nigrum

Binomial name
- Phyteuma nigrum F.W.Schmidt

= Phyteuma nigrum =

Species of plant

Phyteuma nigrum, the black rampion, is a relatively rare species of plant in the family Campanulaceae. P. nigrum is located in central to northern Europe, primarily concentrated in Scandinavia. Much progress is yet to be made in forming concrete evolutionary relationships within this family and between the genera, but the molecular data from P. nigrum has contributed to the progress made in completing the evolutionary tree. The decrease in P. nigrum numbers over the past few decades has prompted the investigation into the reasons behind such a decline, leading to the conclusion that the factors that lead to a healthy P. nigrum population also run the risk of harming the population if not in just the right amount. The delicate nature of this organism makes its survival and reproductive success that much more uncertain.

== Vegetative characteristics ==
The black rampion is a perennial herbaceous plant that reaches heights of 20 to 70 centimeters. The leaves are lanceolate and about half as wide as they are long. The basal leaves usually only have a shallow, heart-shaped blade base with a notched to sawn leaf edge. The lower stem leaves are ovate and narrowed at the base, the middle and upper ones only have a reduced blade.

== Generative features ==
The relatively wide, egg-shaped to cylindrical, spiked inflorescence with a diameter of 1.5 to 3 centimeters, has one or two bracts. The bracts are linear to lanceolate.

The hermaphrodite, five-fold flower is clearly curved before it blooms. The five petals are black-violet or black-blue, rarely white. The petals first grow together to form a tube, which bursts open from bottom to top during flowering. At the tip, however, the petals remain connected longer and the crown is bent upwards like a claw. The style ends in two stigma branches.

== Geography ==
Phyteuma nigrum is primarily located in northern Europe, encompassing all of Scandinavia, that is, Norway, Denmark, Sweden and Finland, with some populations also growing in Switzerland.

Despite predominately growing in Scandinavia, P. nigrum did not originally grow in countries such as Norway and Denmark, instead being reportedly introduced in the 20th century; Norway in 1908 and Denmark in 1959.

=== Evolutionary relationships ===
The Phyteuma genus as a whole is highly diverse when it comes to its habitat locations. Ranging from mountain ranges to lowlands in Northern Europe, these varying habitats allow the effects of both space and time to be studied for their evolutionary consequences.

=== Molecular data ===
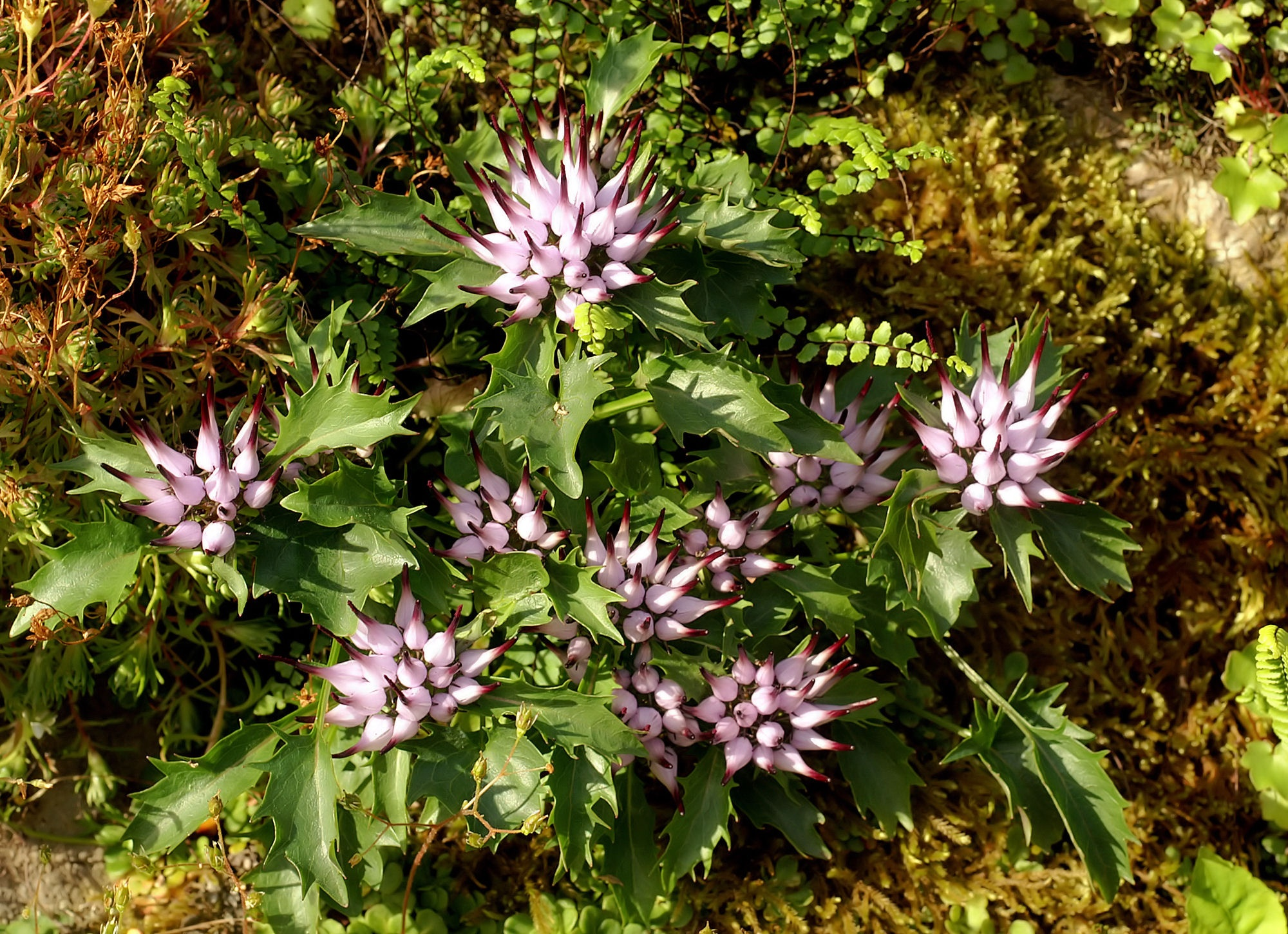
A Physoplexis comosa individual with several flower heads growing together. These organisms are found in southern to central Europe.

With shared flower morphologies, that is, the structure of the individual plant, it is inferred that Phyteuma is closely linked with Physoplexis. While both genera come from the same family (Campanulaceae), this link made via molecular data can have important significance in evolutionarily connecting and ordering the many genera within Campanulaceae, as this family contains over 80 genera, with a total of over 2,000 species.

Using molecular data to identify evolutionary relationships, as opposed to morphology, contributes to strengthening the existing phylogenetic framework for Phyteuma.

A single Phyteuma nigrum individual found in 1999 near what were once German World War II campsites at Sor-Varanger, Finnmark, Northeastern Norway, Fredheim, and Pikevann, has given more information on the spread of P. nigrum to northern latitudes. By comparing with taxa in the same areas, the introduction of P. nigrum to these northern sites can be dated from 1941 to 1944 as Germany introduced these "alien" plants (polemochores).

During this time, Central Europe imported hay used for horse fodder, and the introduction of P. nigrum to these import sites is likely linked to this movement. This introduction contributed to expanding the geographical range of P. nigrum, with Sør-Varanger now marking the northernmost location for the genus.

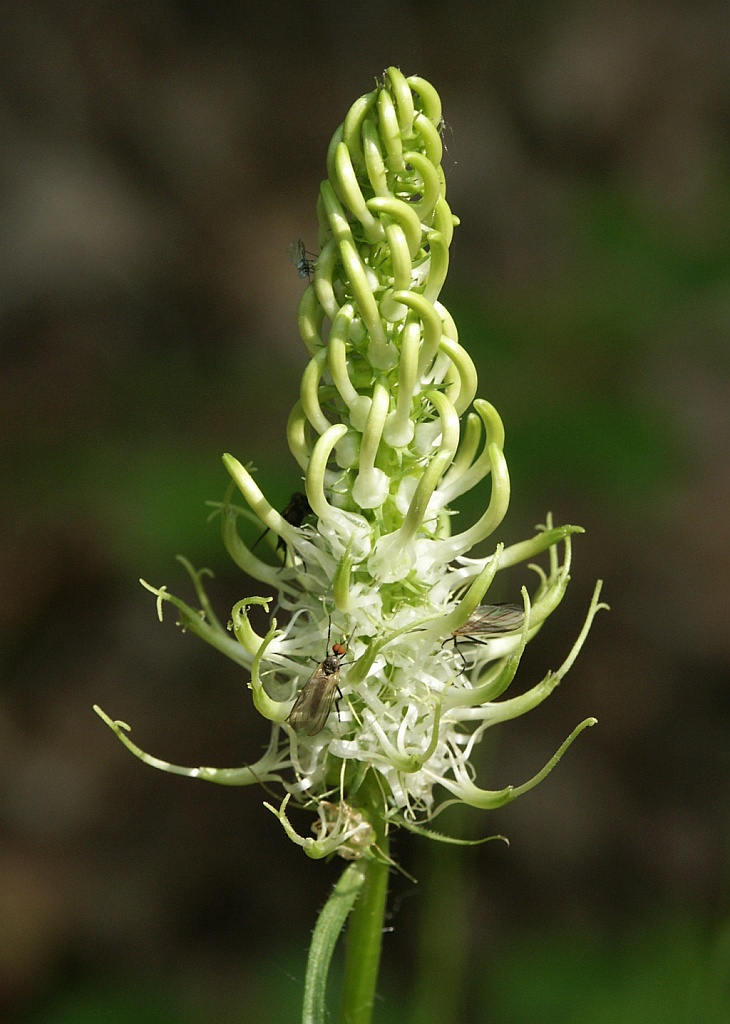
Phyteuma spicatum, a close relative within the same genus as Phyteuma nigrum. This photo captures the flower head of the P. spicatum individual. These organisms are found across Europe.

== Pollination and reproduction ==
The method for pollination within Phyteuma nigrum is primarily animal-based, one animal in particular being the bumblebee. However, pollen limitation is a contributing factor for a lack of fertility within P. nigrum as well as other plants with relatively small populations such as Phyteyma spicatum.

With P. nigrum being a relatively rare species, its small population contributes to the increasing struggle to successfully fertilize and disperse the next generation of sporophytes, that is, P. nigrum embryos. With a smaller population comes less frequent visitations from pollinators. With less pollination, and therefore fertilization, comes less competition between offspring, which negatively impacts the fitness of future generations of P. nigrum.

== Population size and decline ==
Phyteuma nigrum population sizes have been on the decline, particularly in areas such as the Netherlands. Certain means for decline include the environment being too wet, resulting in pH values in the soil increasing to lead to acidification of the soil.

Any factors that may lead to population decline within Phyteuma nigrum appear to work especially negatively toward smaller populations. Because of this risk associated with smaller populations, the ideal population size can lie anywhere from at least 20 flowering individuals to over 1,000, though even populations with under 300 individuals showed lesser fitness.

The size of the population is especially important for the survival and success of any given P. nigrum population, but the surrounding habitat also plays a large role in the population's progeny performance and success. P. nigrum survives best in wet environments in soil with high pH values. These must be held in a careful balance with the factors that have been shown to harm the population if in too much excess. These undoubtedly lead to better population health and larger size, but the habitat diversity of P. nigrum makes these factors harder to expand for all populations. Populations existing in hay meadows at lower elevations would report lower pH values in the soil, and conditions generally present in larger populations are missing for these particular populations.

Whether Phyteuma nigrum offspring perform well or not can be based on their phenotypic performance, that is, the weight of the plant excluding that of water. What this dry weight is dependent on is further dependent on the size of the population. In smaller populations, the phenotypic performance of progeny is highly dependent on the parent generation, whereas, in larger populations, the performance of progeny is largely independent of the parent.
