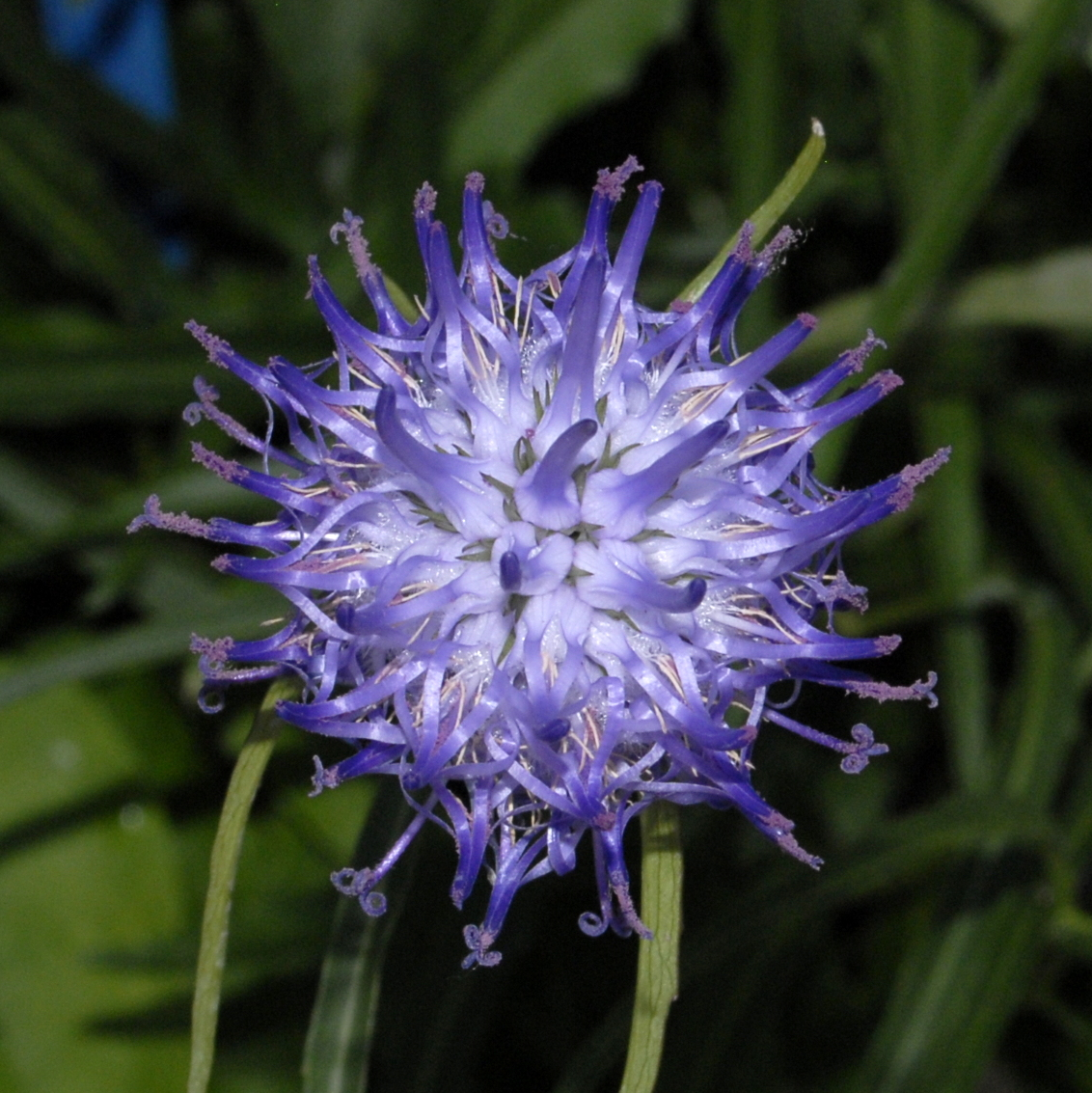
- Inflorescence of Phyteuma scheuchzeri

Scientific classification
- Kingdom: Plantae
- Clade: Tracheophytes
- Clade: Angiosperms
- Clade: Eudicots
- Clade: Asterids
- Order: Asterales
- Family: Campanulaceae
- Genus: Phyteuma
- Species: P. scheuchzeri

Binomial name
- Phyteuma scheuchzeri All.

Synonyms
- Phyteuma corniculatum Clairv.; Rapunculus scheuchzeri All

= Phyteuma scheuchzeri =

Species of flowering plant

Phyteuma scheuchzeri, the Oxford rampion or horned rampion, is a perennial herbaceous flowering plant in the family Campanulaceae.

== Subspecies ==
- Phyteuma scheuchzeri columnae
- Phyteuma scheuchzeri scheuchzeri

== Description ==
Phyteuma scheuchzeri can reach a height of 300–450 millimetres (12–18 in). This plant form tufts of narrow, light bluish green leaves with tall stems holding little head-shaped inflorescence of deep-blue flowers. The bracts are lanceolate to linear and longer than the clusters.

== Distribution ==
This species can be found in Southern Alps and in Northern Appennini, in Great Britain, Switzerland, France, Italy and former Yugoslavia.

== Habitat ==
This species grows mostly in crevices on limestone and silicate rocks at altitudes of up to 3600 meters.

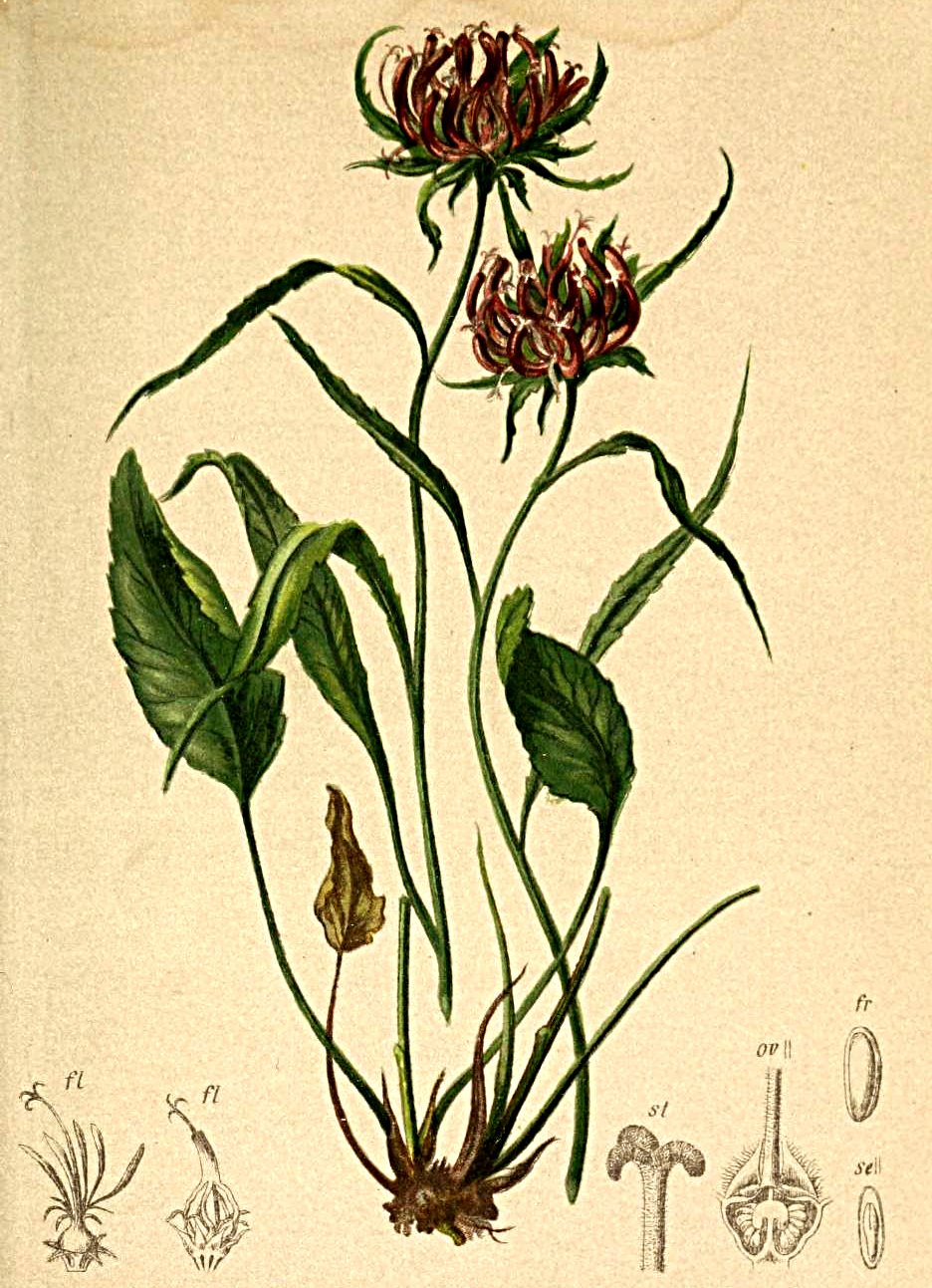
Illustration from Atlas der Alpenflora (1882), A. Hartinger

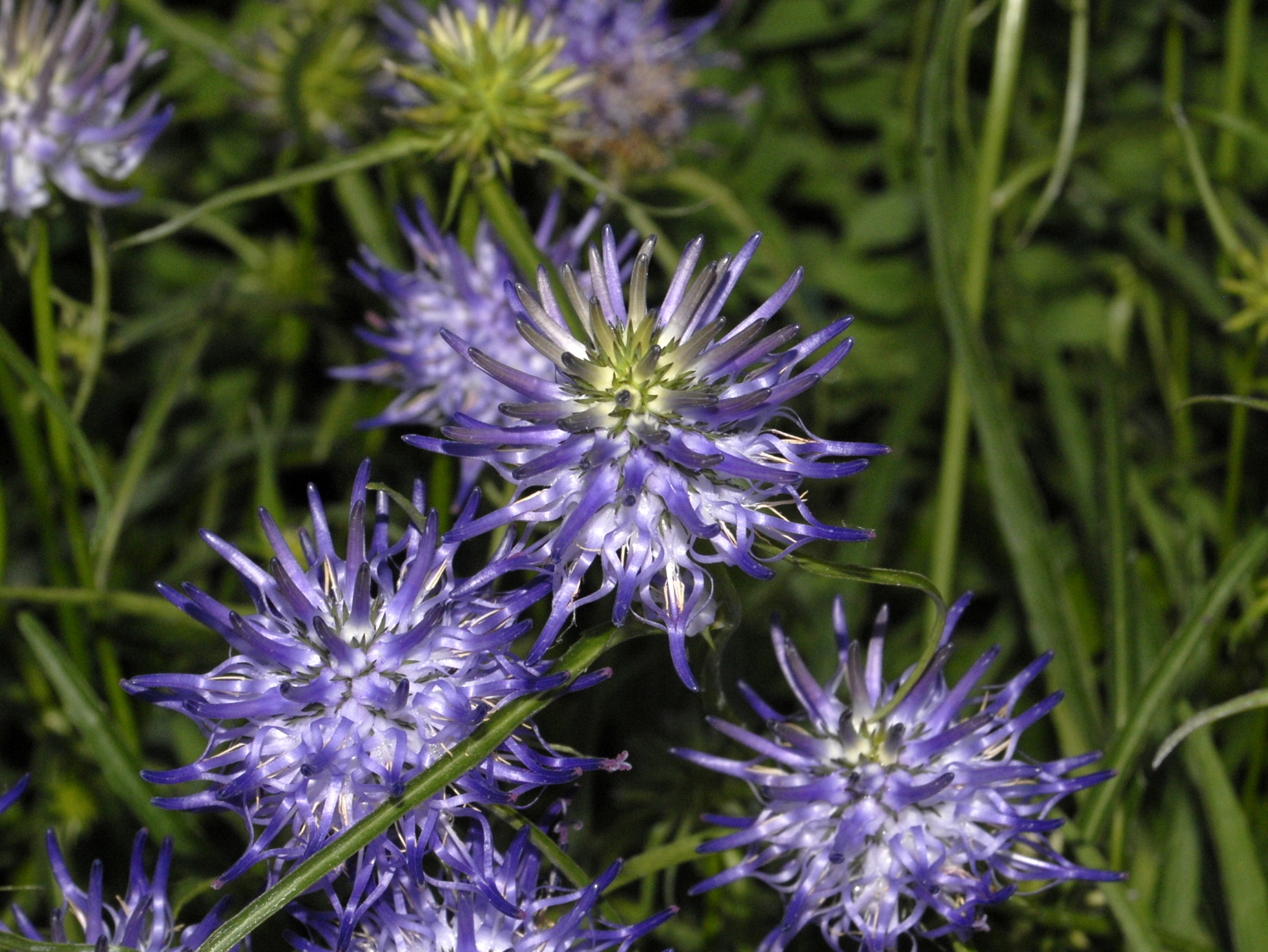
Phyteuma scheuchzeri
