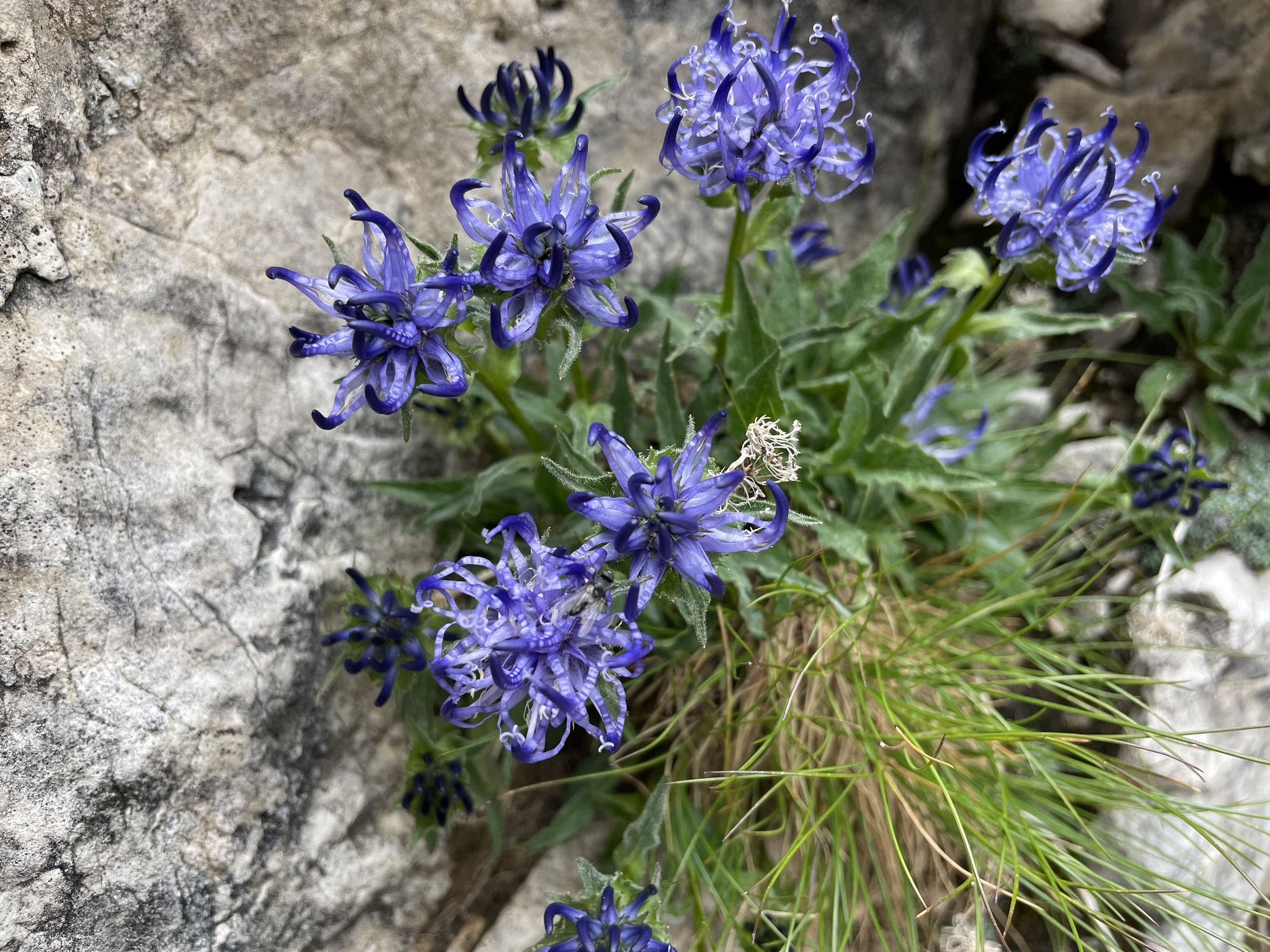

Scientific classification
- Kingdom: Plantae
- Clade: Tracheophytes
- Clade: Angiosperms
- Clade: Eudicots
- Clade: Asterids
- Order: Asterales
- Family: Campanulaceae
- Genus: Phyteuma
- Species: P. sieberi

Binomial name
- Phyteuma sieberi Spreng.

= Phyteuma sieberi =

Species of plant

Phyteuma sieberi, the horned rampion, is a species of herbaceous perennial plant in the family Campanulaceae. It is native to the South-eastern Alps, where it grows on limestone slopes. It was named after Franz Sieber, a 19th-century Bohemian botanist.
