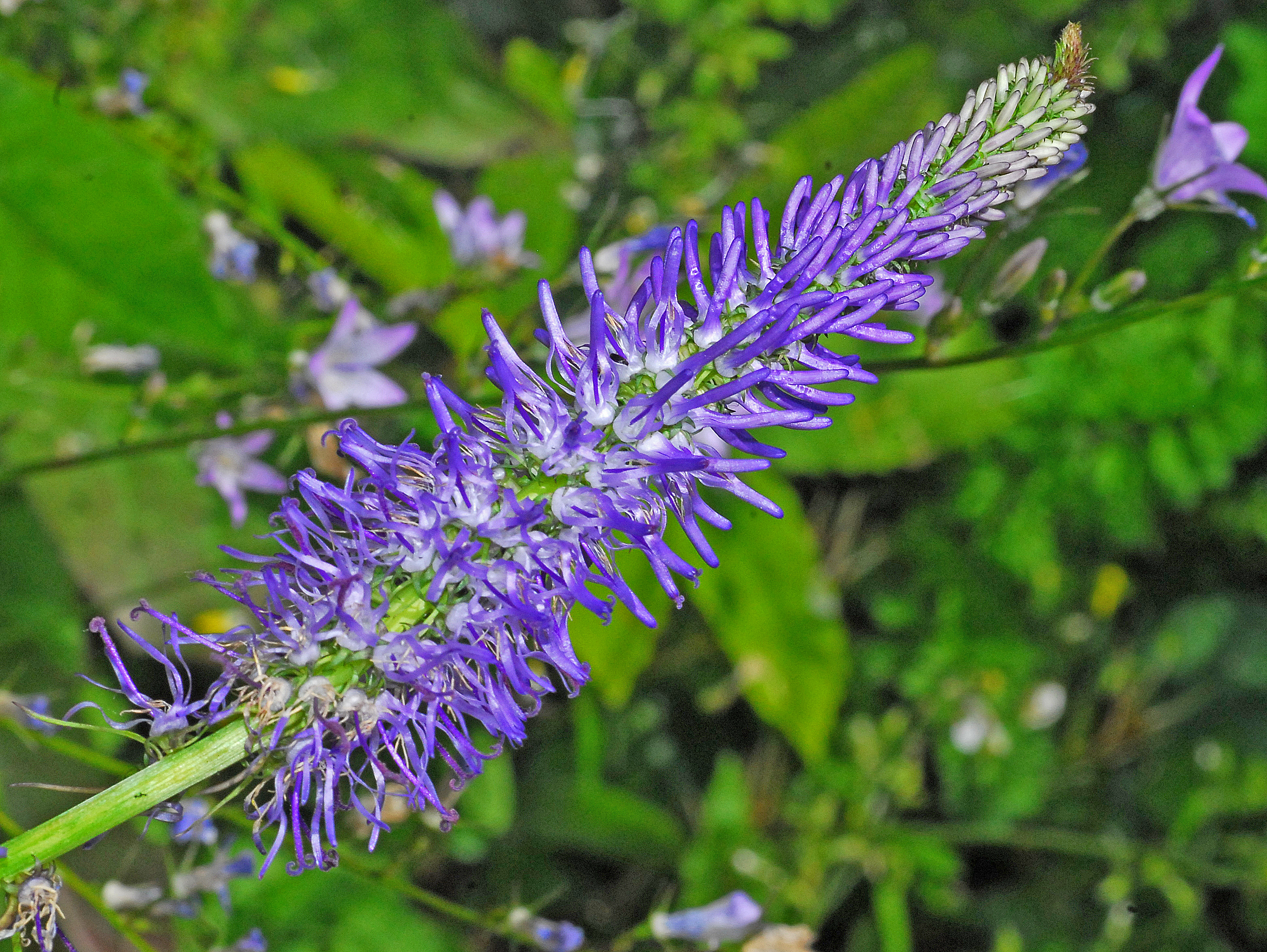
- Inflorescence of Phyteuma betonicifolium

Scientific classification
- Kingdom: Plantae
- Clade: Tracheophytes
- Clade: Angiosperms
- Clade: Eudicots
- Clade: Asterids
- Order: Asterales
- Family: Campanulaceae
- Genus: Phyteuma
- Species: P. betonicifolium

Binomial name
- Phyteuma betonicifolium Vill.

Synonyms
- List: Phyteuma betonicifolium f. alpestre Rich.Schulz; Phyteuma betonicifolium f. glabrum Rich.Schulz; Phyteuma betonicifolium var. lanceolatum Rich.Schulz; Phyteuma betonicifolium var. pubescens A.DC.; Phyteuma betonicifolium f. pubescens (A.DC.) Rich.Schulz; Phyteuma betonicifolium f. rhaeticum Rich.Schulz; Phyteuma betonicifolium var. sessilifolium A.DC.; Phyteuma betonicifolium f. vulgare Rich.Schulz; Phyteuma michelii subsp. betonicifolium (Vill.) Nyman; Phyteuma michelii var. sessilifolium (A.DC.) Rouy; Phyteuma michelii var. veronicifolium (Schrad. ex A.DC.) Nyman; Phyteuma spicatum var. betonicifolium (Vill.) Lapeyr.; Phyteuma veronicifolium Schrad. ex A.DC.

= Phyteuma betonicifolium =

Species of flowering plant

Phyteuma betonicifolium, common name betony-leaved rampion, is a species of flowering plant in the family Campanulaceae.

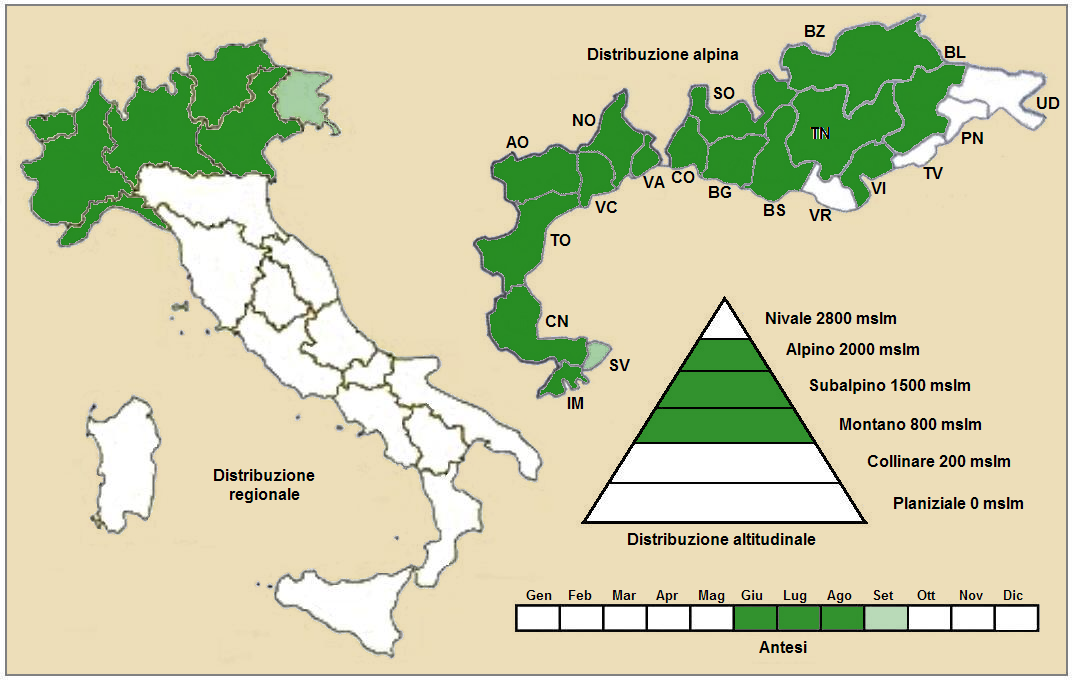
Distribution of Phyteuma betonicifolium

== Etymology ==
The generic name (Phyteuma) derives from the Greek word "phyto" (= plant) and means: "what is planted", while the specific epithet (betonicifolium) means "with betonic leaves" (Betonica or Stachys is a genus of plants of the Lamiaceae family).

== Subspecies ==
Subspecies include:

- Phyteuma betonicifolium betonicifolium Vill.
- Phyteuma betonicifolium scaposum (R. Schulz)

== Distribution ==
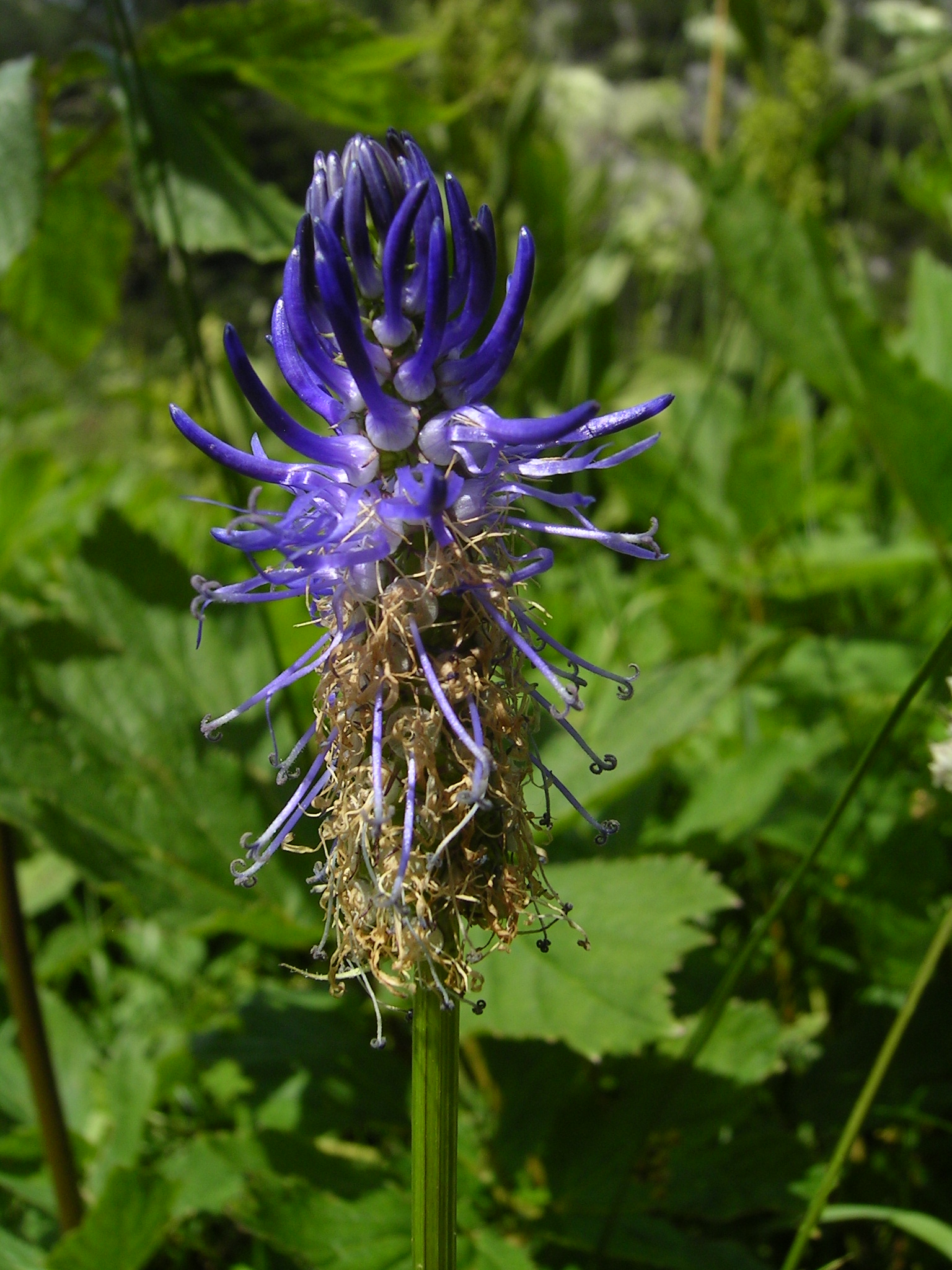
Phyteuma betonicifolium

Phyteuma betonicifolium occurs from France, Switzerland to Italy and from Germany to Austria to the former Yugoslavia.

== Habitat ==
This species can be found in the Alps in subalpine to alpine zones at altitudes of 1000 to 2700 meters. It is fairly common and thrives in meadows, pastures and scrub.(in German)

== Description ==
Phyteuma betonicifolium are herbaceous perennial plants, growing to about 25–70 cm (9.8–27.6 in) tall. The stem is erect and simple, the upper third is usually glabrous.

The basal leaves are long-stalked and their leaf blade is heart-shaped or rounded at the base, sharply and bluntly toothed and three to eight times as long as wide. The upper stem leaves are narrow-lanceolate and sessile. The underground part is a rhizome.

The light blue-violet flowers are fivefold. They are produced in dense erect panicles, about 4–10 cm (1.6–3.9 in) long. The inflorescence is ovate-cylindrical. The bracts are narrow - lanceolate. The flowering period extends from June to August. The fruit is a capsule containing numerous small seeds.

== Bibliography ==
- Elias Landolt: Unsere Alpenflora. 5. Auflage 1984, ISBN 3-85902-045-5. (in German)
- Finkenzeller, Xaver; Grau, Jürke; Steinbach, Gunter (1996). Alpenblumen (in German). München: Mosaik-Verl. ISBN 3-576-10558-1. OCLC 164903320.
