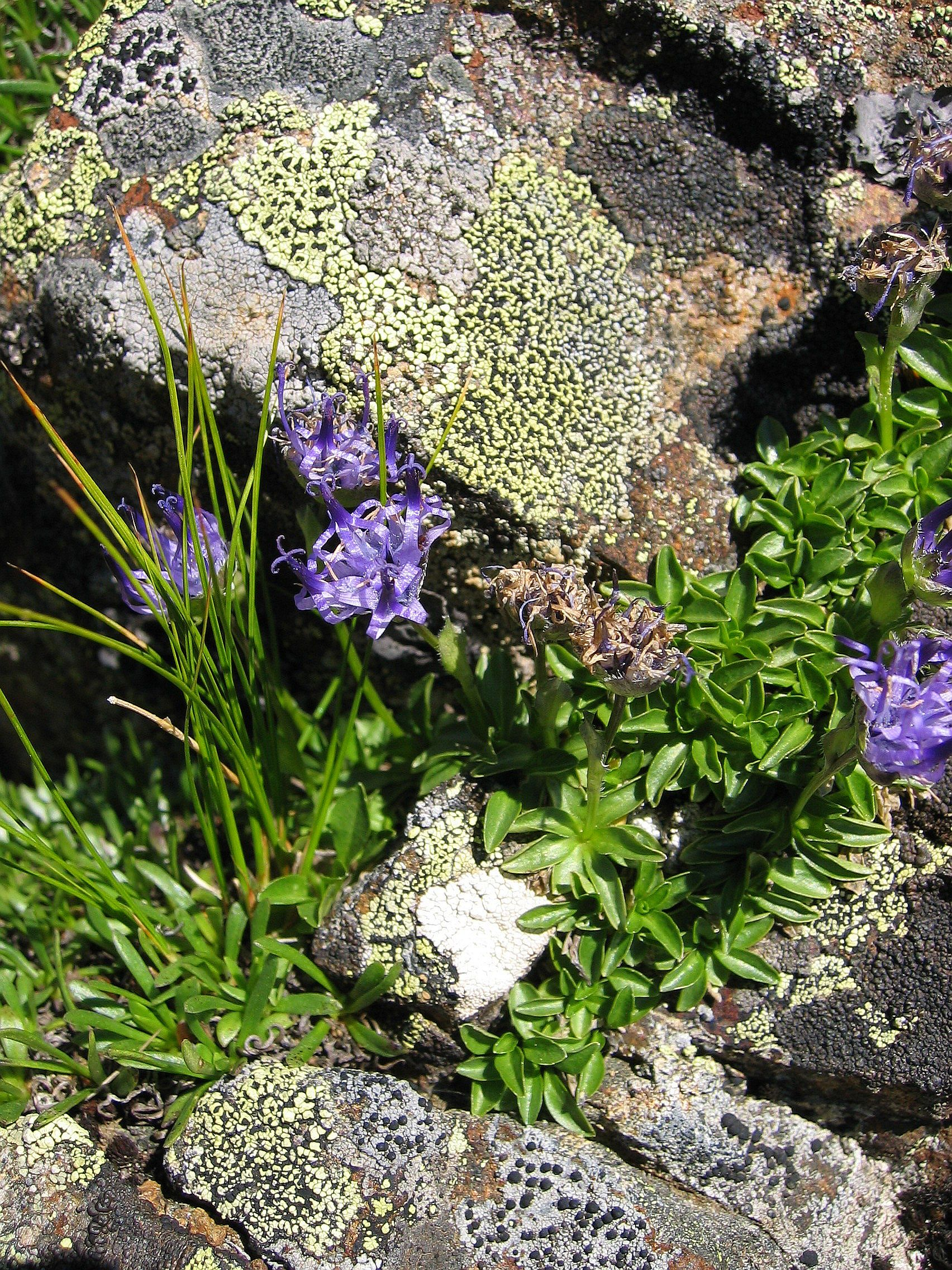
- Phyteuma globulariifolium

Scientific classification
- Kingdom: Plantae
- Clade: Tracheophytes
- Clade: Angiosperms
- Clade: Eudicots
- Clade: Asterids
- Order: Asterales
- Family: Campanulaceae
- Subfamily: Campanuloideae
- Genus: Phyteuma; L.

Synonyms
- Rapunculus Mill.

= Phyteuma =

Genus of plants

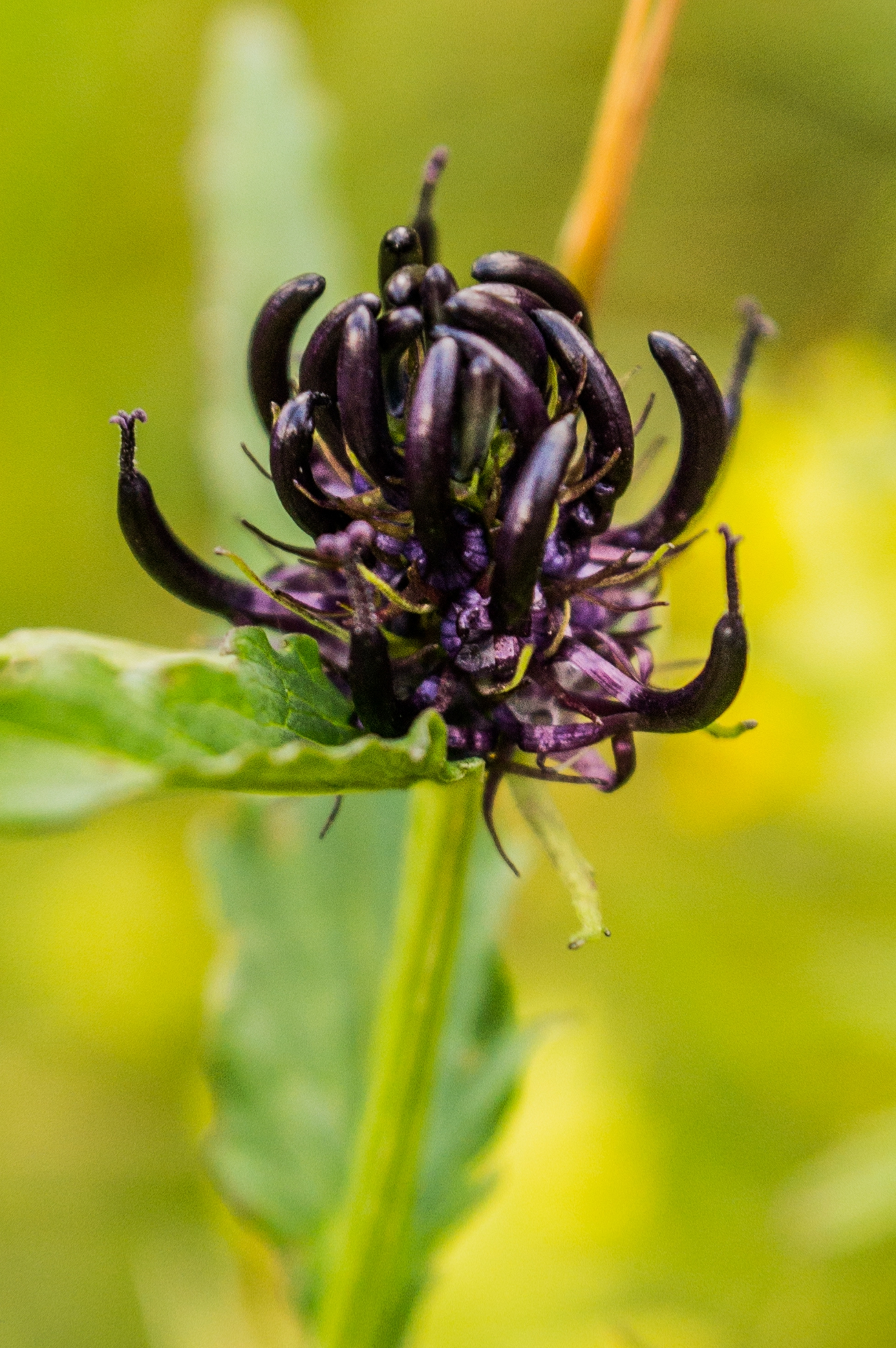
Phyteuma vagneri in Rodnei Mountains

Phyteuma is a genus of flowering plants in the family Campanulaceae, native to Europe and Morocco.

The common name is rampion, a name shared with the related plant Campanula rapunculus. Rampion features prominently in some versions of the fairy tale Rapunzel. In the version collected by the Brothers Grimm, it is said that "rapunzel" is the name given to a local variety of rampion.

The species are herbaceous perennial plants, growing to 5–90 cm tall. The leaves are alternate, petiolate, and vary in shape on a single plant, with larger, broader leaves at the base of the stem and smaller, narrower leaves higher up; the leaf margin is serrated. The flowers are produced in dense erect panicles, each flower with a narrow, deeply five-lobed corolla, 1–2 cm or more long), mostly purple, sometimes pale blue, white or pink. The fruit is a capsule containing numerous small seeds.

== Species ==
- Phyteuma × adulterinum - Germany, Czech Republic (P. nigrum × P. spicatum)
- Phyteuma betonicifolium - Alps
- Phyteuma charmelii - Morocco, Spain, France, Italy
- Phyteuma confusum - Austria, Balkans
- Phyteuma cordatum - French and Italian Alps
- Phyteuma gallicum - France
- Phyteuma globulariifolium - Pyrenees, Alps
- Phyteuma hedraianthifolium Switzerland, northern Italy
- Phyteuma hemisphaericum - Spain, France, Switzerland, Germany, Austria
- Phyteuma humile - France, Italy
- Phyteuma × huteri Murr - Austrian Alps (P. betonicifolium × P. ovatum)
- Phyteuma michelii - France, Italy
- Phyteuma nigrum - Black rampion - France, Belgium, Germany, Czech Republic, Austria
- Phyteuma × obornyanum - Austrian Alps (P. confusum × P. globulariifolium)
- Phyteuma orbiculare - Round-headed rampion - most of Europe except Ireland, Scandinavia, Greece, Bulgaria
- Phyteuma × orbiculariforme - Czech Republic (P. nigrum × P. orbiculare)
- Phyteuma ovatum - Pyrenees, Alps
- Phyteuma persicifolium - Slovenia, Austria, Trentino-Alto Adige, Veneto, Friuli-Venezia Giulia
- Phyteuma × pyrenaeum Sennen - French Pyrenees (P. ovatum × P. spicatum)
- Phyteuma rupicola - French Pyrenees
- Phyteuma scheuchzeri - Alps; naturalised in Great Britain
- Phyteuma scorzonerifolium Vill. - Alps
- Phyteuma serratum Viv. - Corsica
- Phyteuma sieberi - Alps
- Phyteuma spicatum - Spiked rampion - most of Europe
- Phyteuma tetramerum - Carpathians of Romania and Ukraine
- Phyteuma vagneri - Carpathians of Romania and Ukraine
- Phyteuma zahlbruckneri
