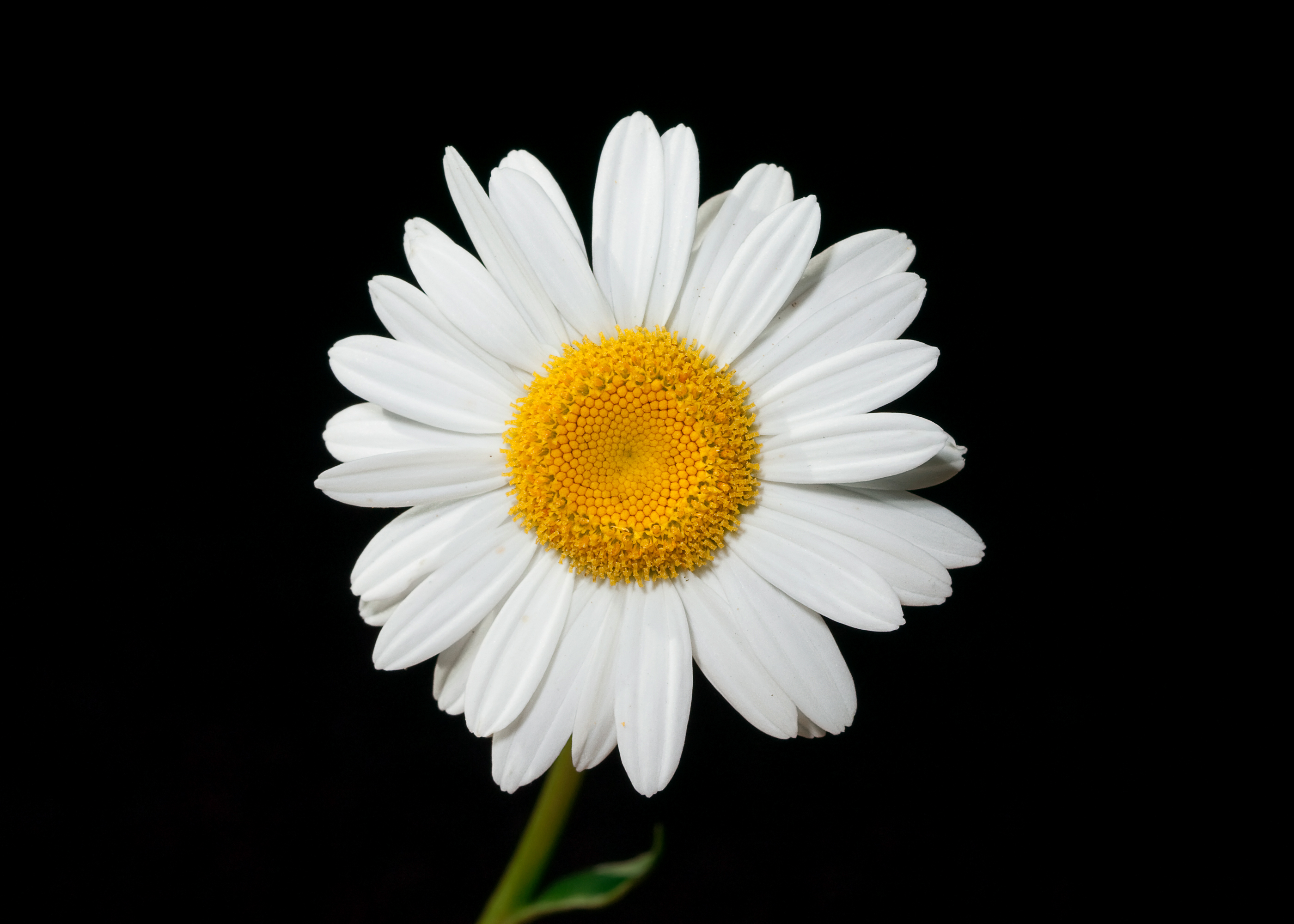
- Leucanthemum vulgare

Scientific classification
- Kingdom: Plantae
- Clade: Embryophytes
- Clade: Tracheophytes
- Clade: Angiosperms
- Clade: Eudicots
- Clade: Asterids
- Order: Asterales
- Family: Asteraceae
- Subfamily: Asteroideae
- Tribe: Anthemideae
- Genus: Leucanthemum; Mill. (1754)

Type species
- Leucanthemum vulgare Lam.

Species
- See text

Synonyms
- Phalacrodiscus Less.

= Leucanthemum =

Genus of flowering plants

Leucanthemum is a genus of flowering plants in the aster family, Asteraceae. Species range naturally from Europe through the Caucasus, Turkey, Iran, Central Asia, and Siberia to the Russian Far East. Some species are known on other continents as introduced species, and some are cultivated as ornamental plants. The name Leucanthemum derives from the Greek words λευκός – leukos ("white") and ἄνθεμον – anthemon ("flower"). Common names for Leucanthemum species usually include the name daisy (e.g. ox-eye daisy, Shasta daisy), but "daisy" can also refer to numerous other genera in the Asteraceae family.

== Description ==
Leucanthemum species are perennial plants growing from red-tipped rhizomes. The plant produces one erect stem usually reaching 40 to 130 centimeters tall, but known to exceed 2 meters at times. It is branching or unbranched and hairy to hairless. Some species have mainly basal leaves, and some have leaves along the stem, as well. Some leaves are borne on petioles, and others are sessile, attached to the stem at their bases. They vary in shape, and some are lobed or toothed.

The flower head is solitary, paired, or in a group of three on the stem. The base of the head is layered with up to 60 or more rough-edged phyllaries. The Leucanthemum head has about 13 to 34 ray florets of various widths, occasionally more, and rarely none. The ray florets are always white but fade pink with age. The head has over 100 yellow disc florets at the center. The fruit is a ribbed, hairless cypsela.

== Ecology ==
Leucanthemum species are used as food plants by the larvae of some Lepidoptera species, including the bucculatricid leaf-miners Bucculatrix argentisignella, B. leucanthemella, and B. nigricomella, which feed exclusively on Leucanthemum vulgare.

== Species ==
About 50 species are accepted, along with several interspecies hybrids.

- Leucanthemum adustum Gremli
- Leucanthemum ageratifolium Pau
- Leucanthemum aligulatum Vogt
- Leucanthemum × aramisii Flor.Wagner, Vogt & Oberpr.
- Leucanthemum × athosii Flor.Wagner, Vogt & Oberpr.
- Leucanthemum atratum (Jacq.) DC.
- Leucanthemum burnatii Briq. & Cavill.
- Leucanthemum cacuminis Vogt, Konowalik & Oberpr.
- Leucanthemum cantabricum Sennen
- Leucanthemum catalaunicum Vogt
- Leucanthemum chloroticum Kern. & Murb.
- Leucanthemum coronopifolium Vill.
- Leucanthemum corsicum (Sieber ex Less.) DC.
- Leucanthemum × corunnense Lago
- Leucanthemum crassifolium (Lange) Lange
- Leucanthemum cuneifolium Legrand ex H.J.Coste
- Leucanthemum delarbrei Timb.-Lagr.
- Leucanthemum eliasii (Sennen & Pau) Vogt, Konowalik & Oberpr.
- Leucanthemum esterellense (Briq. & Cavill.) Vogt, Konowalik & Oberpr.
- Leucanthemum favargeri Vogt
- Leucanthemum gallaecicum Rodr.Oubiña & S.Ortiz
- Leucanthemum gaudinii Dalla Torre
- Leucanthemum glaucophyllum (Briq. & Cavill.) Jahand.
- Leucanthemum gracilicaule (Dufour) Pau
- Leucanthemum graminifolium (L.) Lam.
- Leucanthemum halleri Ducommun
- Leucanthemum heterophyllum (Willd.) DC.
- Leucanthemum illyricum (Horvatić) Vogt & Greuter
- Leucanthemum ircutianum DC.
- Leucanthemum laciniatum Huter, Porta & Rigo
- Leucanthemum lacustre (Brot.) Samp.
- Leucanthemum legraeanum (Rouy) B.Bock & J.-M.Tison
- Leucanthemum ligusticum Marchetti, R.Bernardello, Melai & Peruzzi
- Leucanthemum lithopolitanicum (E.Mayer) Polatschek
- Leucanthemum maestracense Vogt & F.H.Hellw.
- Leucanthemum × marchii Konowalik, Vogt & Oberpr.
- Leucanthemum maximum (Ramond) DC. – max chrysanthemum
- Leucanthemum meridionale Legrand
- Leucanthemum monspeliense (L.) H.J.Coste
- Leucanthemum montserratianum Vogt
- Leucanthemum pachyphyllum Marchi & Illum.
- Leucanthemum pallens DC.
- Leucanthemum × pawlowskii Piękoś
- Leucanthemum platylepis Borbás
- Leucanthemum pluriflorum Pau
- Leucanthemum × porthosii Flor.Wagner, Vogt & Oberpr.
- Leucanthemum pseudosylvaticum (Vogt) Vogt & Oberpr.
- Leucanthemum pyrenaicum Vogt, Konowalik & Oberpr.
- Leucanthemum rohlenae (Horvatić) Vogt & Greuter
- Leucanthemum rotundifolium DC.
- Leucanthemum subglaucum De Laramb.
- Leucanthemum sylvaticum (Brot.) Nyman
- Leucanthemum tridactylites (A.Kern. & Huter) Bazzich.
- Leucanthemum valentinum Pau
- Leucanthemum virgatum (Desr.) Clos
- Leucanthemum visianii (Gjurašin) Vogt & Greuter
- Leucanthemum vulgare (Vaill.) Lam. – ox-eye daisy

=== Artificial hybrids ===
- Leucanthemum × superbum (Bergmans ex J.W.Ingram) D.H.Kent – artificial hybrid, L. lacustre × L. maximum × L. vulgare – Shasta daisy

=== Formerly placed here ===
- Mauranthemum paludosum (Poir.) Vogt & Oberpr. (as Leucanthemum paludosum (Poir.) Bonnet & Barratte)

== Gallery ==
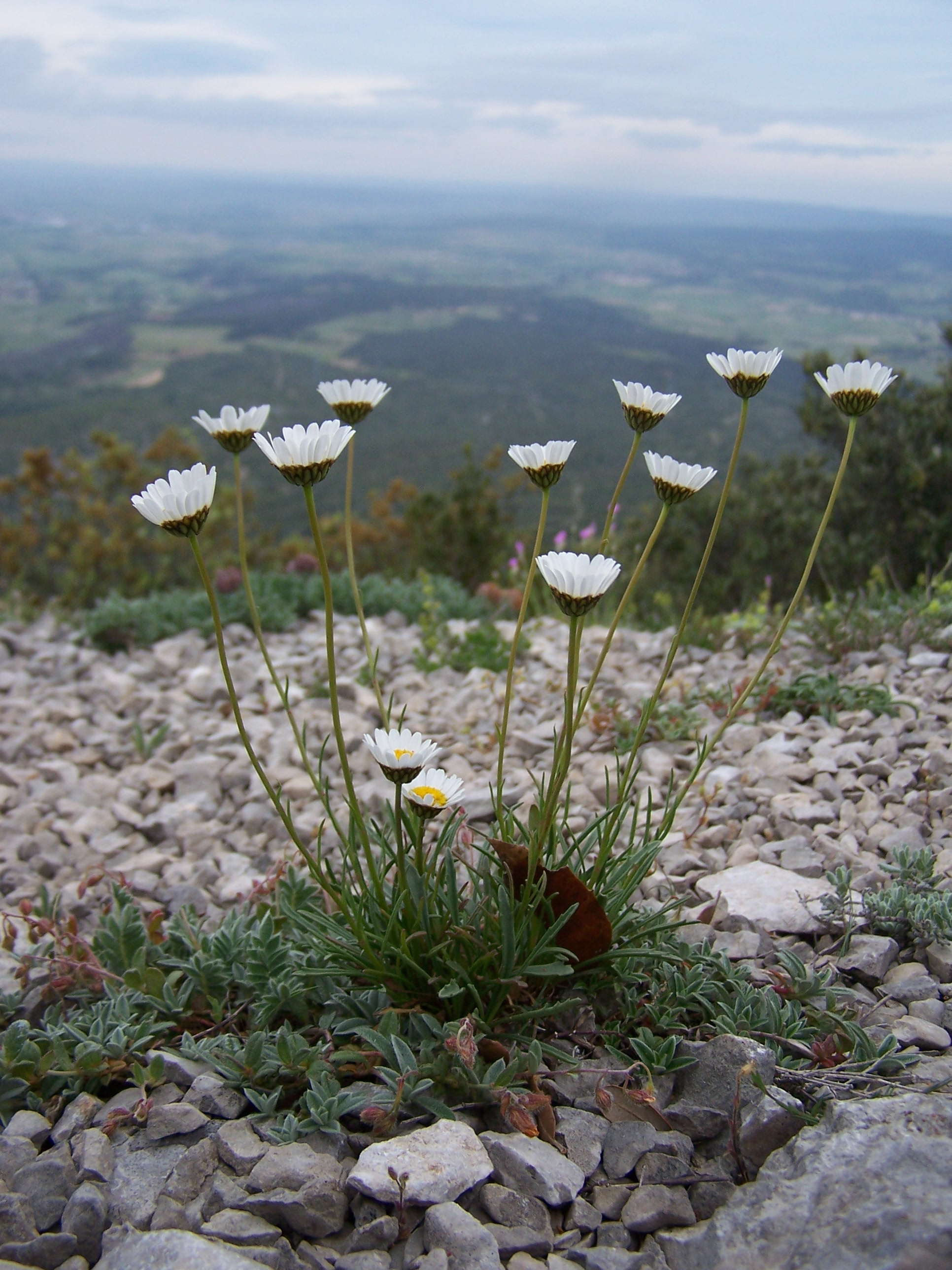
Leucanthemum graminifolium

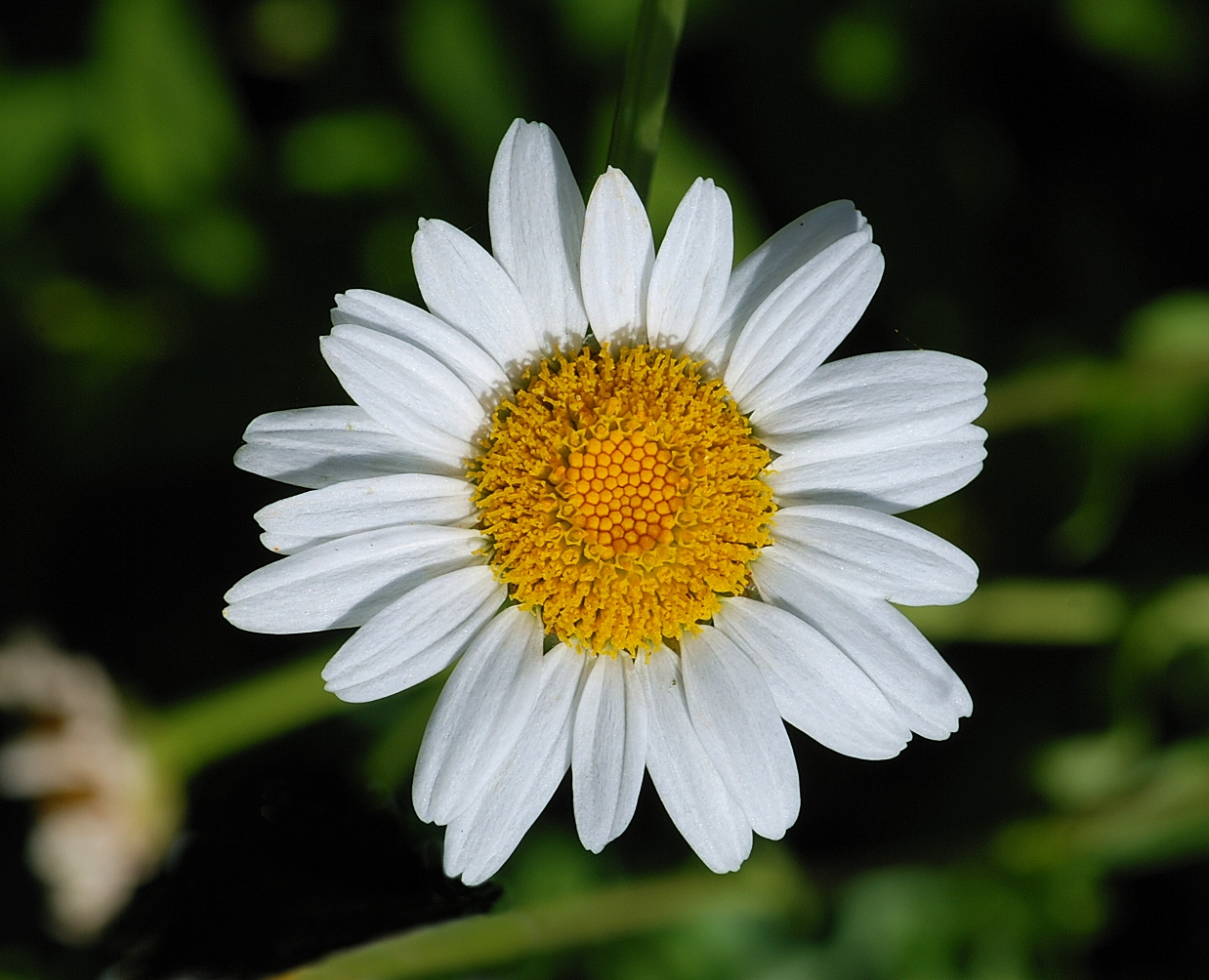
Leucanthemum lacustre

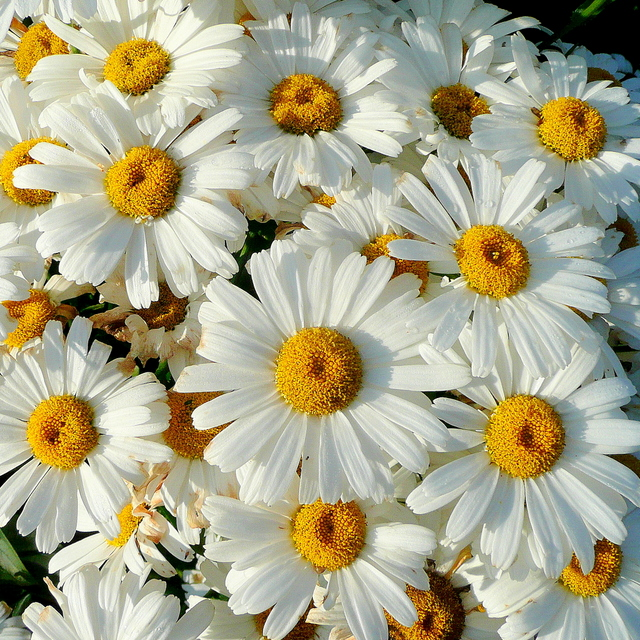
Leucanthemum × superbum

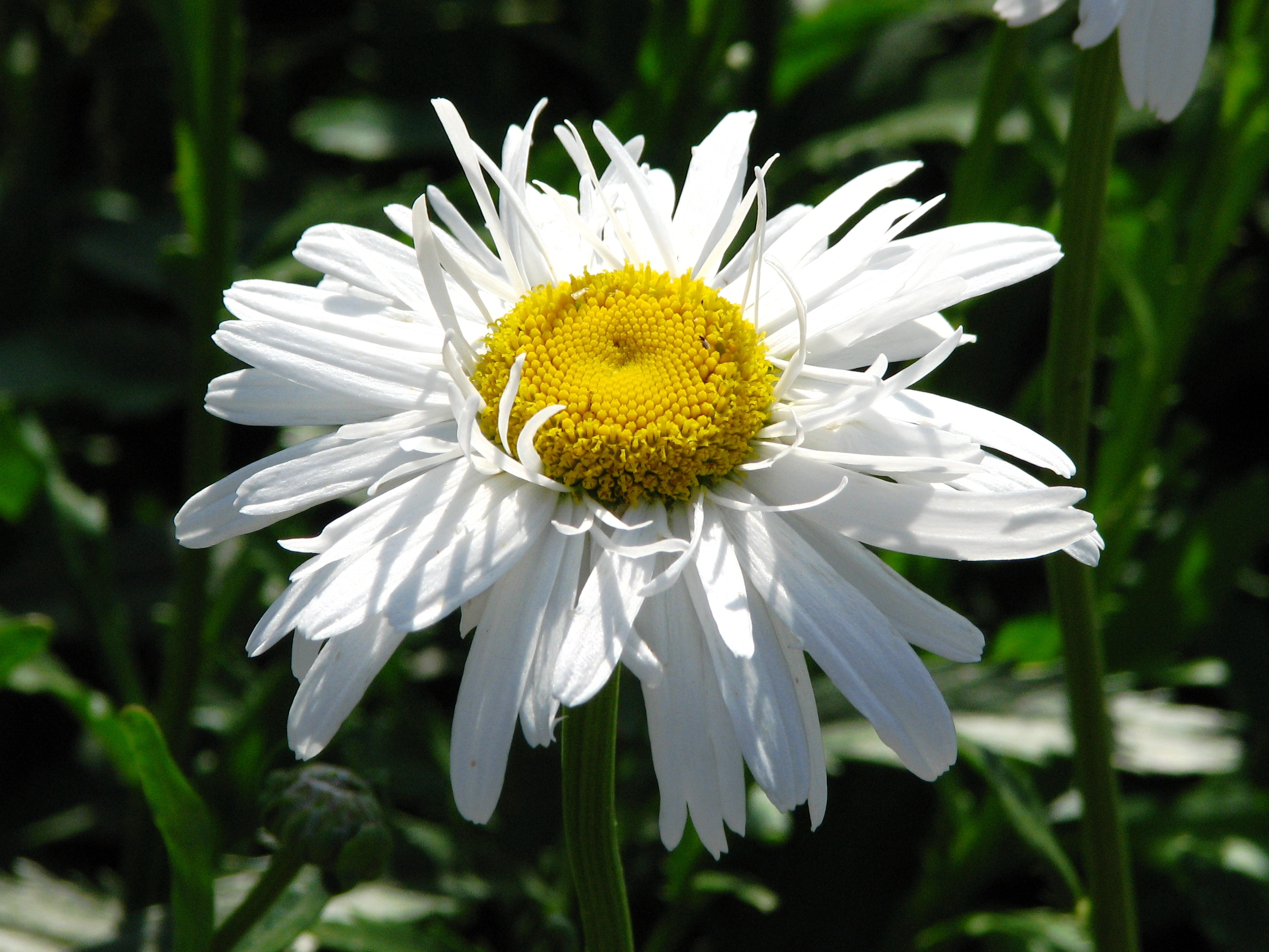
Leucanthemum maximum 'Crazy Daisy'

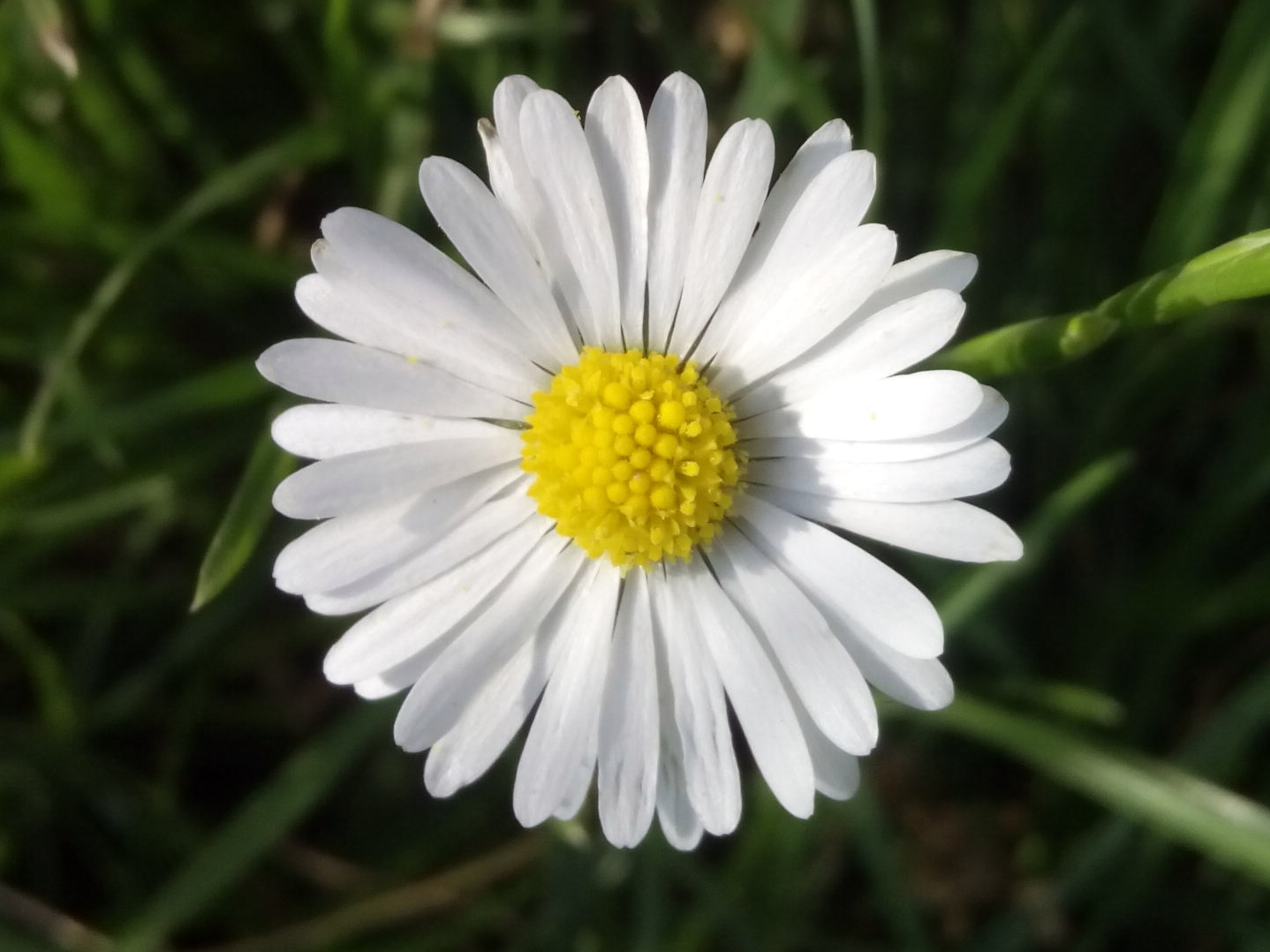
