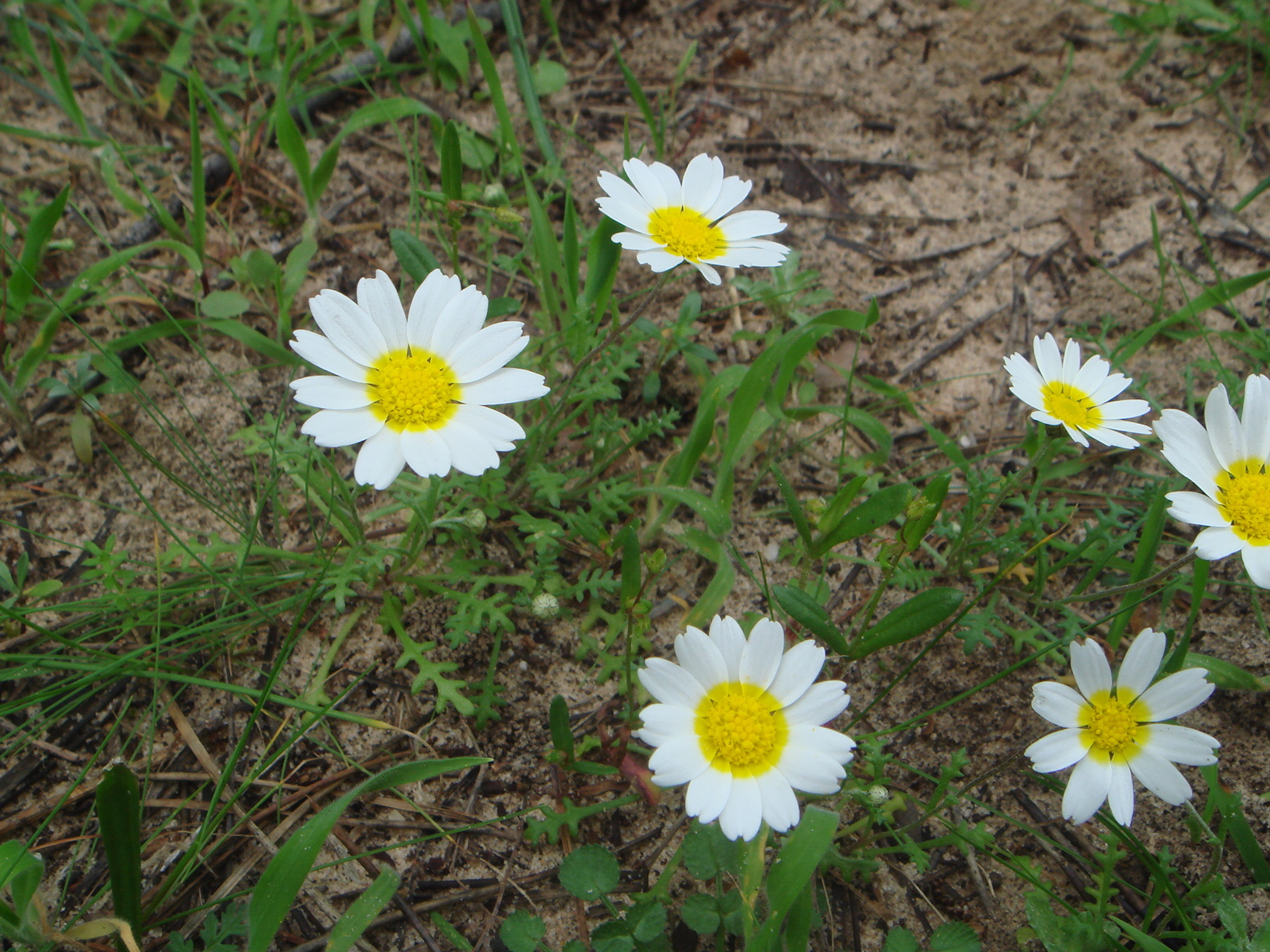
- Hymenostemma pseudanthemis

Scientific classification
- Kingdom: Plantae
- Clade: Tracheophytes
- Clade: Angiosperms
- Clade: Eudicots
- Clade: Asterids
- Order: Asterales
- Family: Asteraceae
- Subfamily: Asteroideae
- Tribe: Anthemideae
- Genus: Hymenostemma; Kunze ex Willkomm
- Species: H. pseudanthemis

Binomial name
- Hymenostemma pseudanthemis Kunze ex Willkomm

Synonyms
- Prolongoa pseudanthemis Kunze; Chrysanthemum pseudanthemis Cout.

= Hymenostemma =

Genus of flowering plants

Hymenostemma is a genus of flowering plants in the daisy family.

Species

There is only one known species, Hymenostemma pseudanthemis, native to Spain and Morocco.

formerly included

see Mauranthemum

- Hymenostemma fontanesii Willk. - Mauranthemum paludosum (Poir.) Vogt & Oberpr.
- Hymenostemma paludosum (Poir.) Pomel - Mauranthemum paludosum (Poir.) Vogt & Oberpr.
