= Phi Sigma =

Honor society at Ohio State University

- ΦΣ
- Founded: March 17, 1915; 111 years ago Ohio State University
- Type: Honor
- Affiliation: ACHS
- Status: Active
- Emphasis: Biological sciences
- Scope: International
- Motto: "Truth Shall Spring out of the Earth"
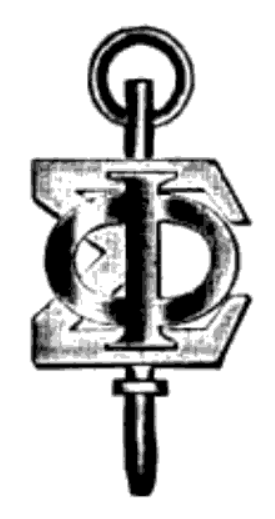
- Member badge
- Colors: Medium Green, White, and Old gold
- Flower: Shasta daisy
- Jewel: Pearl
- Publication: The Biologist
- Chapters: 93
- Members: 80,000+ lifetime
- Headquarters: c/o Dr. Gene Wong; Dean of Arts and Sciences; Endicott College; 376 Hale Street; Beverly, Massachusetts 01915-2096; United States
- Website: phisigmasociety.org

Phi Sigma (ΦΣ) is an honor society for students of biological sciences, formed at Ohio State University.

== History ==
The Phi Sigma honor society was founded on March 17, 1915, at Ohio State University to honor excellence in biological research. In 1928 its constitution was so altered that the society "should now be considered as a working guild", with a focus on ongoing research. The society now includes more broadly the field of the biological sciences.

In 1947, Phi Sigma became international when it established a chapter at the Universidad Nacional Autónoma de México. In 1949, it opened a second international chapter, at the University of the Philippines in Manila.

Phi Sigma became a member of the Association of College Honor Societies in 1950. By 2012, it had 21 active chapters, 905 active members, and 80,063 total initiates.

Its national headquarters are in Beverly, Massachusetts.

== Symbols ==
The Greek letters, Phi and Sigma, signify "Fellows in Science". Fellowship in science includes ardent cooperative effort, effective leadership, and creative scholarship. Its motto is "Truth shall spring from the earth." Its flower is the Shasta daisy. Its colors of the society are medium green, white, and old gold, taken from the colors of the society's flower. Its jewel is the pearl.

Phi Sigma's coat of arms consists of a simple heraldic shield, that is half black and half silver. The black side represents ignorance; growing from the blackness is a green, white, and gold Shasta daisy that represents truth rising toward the light. The silver side represents the silver sky of light and knowledge and has a fiery cloud of intellectual inspiration; a hand bearing a pearl, the society's jewel, is coming out of the cloud. Below the shield is a gold scroll with the society's motto.

Phi Sigma's emblem consists of a watch key fob formed of the Greek letters Φ and Σ, the former being superimposed upon the latter.

== Membership ==
Phi Sigma is reserved for students who have demonstrated interest in research and are in the top 35 percent of their class with a 3.0 GPA. At least one-fourth of their college training should include biological sciences.

== Chapters ==
The society reports 93 active chapters since 1915.
