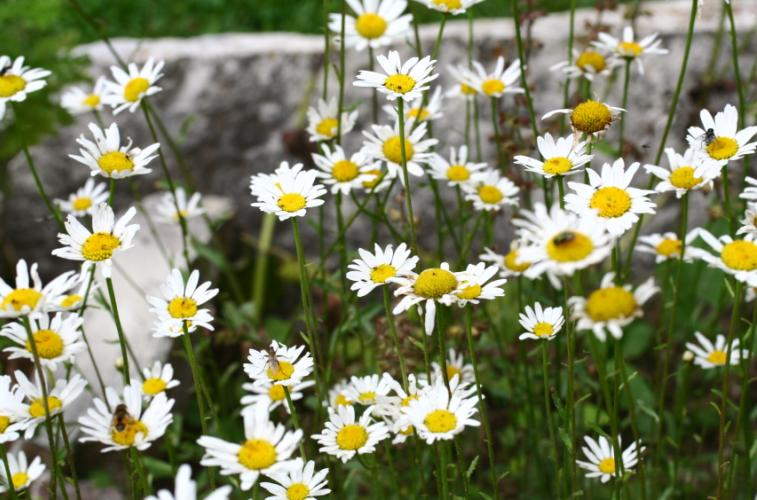

Scientific classification
- Kingdom: Plantae
- Clade: Embryophytes
- Clade: Tracheophytes
- Clade: Spermatophytes
- Clade: Angiosperms
- Clade: Eudicots
- Clade: Asterids
- Order: Asterales
- Family: Asteraceae
- Genus: Leucanthemum
- Species: L. ircutianum

Binomial name
- Leucanthemum ircutianum (Turcz.) DC., 1838

Synonyms
- Chrysanthemum leucanthemum subsp. triviale Gaudin, 1829; Chrysanthemum leucanthemum var. pinnatifidum Lecoq & Lamotte; Leucanthemum rotundifolium (Opiz) Pouzar, 1975; Leucanthemum vulgare subsp. triviale (Gaudin) Briq. & Cavill., 1916; Leucanthemum vulgare var. pinnatifidum (Lecoq & Lamotte) Moldenke

= Leucanthemum ircutianum =

Species of plant

Leucanthemum ircutianum is a herbaceous perennial plant species in the family Asteraceae, that can be found growing in Eurasian (mostly European) countries and North America. Just like the similar L. vulgare, it is commonly known as the oxeye daisy.

== Taxonomy ==
Species name and the first formal description were given to this plant by Swiss botanist Augustin Pyramus de Candolle in year 1838.

Even though taxonomy of this species and related taxa is complicated, there are currently three recognized subspecies:

- Leucanthemum ircutianum subsp. asperulum (N.Terracc.) Vogt & Greuter
- Leucanthemum ircutianum subsp. ircutianum
- Leucanthemum ircutianum subsp. leucolepis (Briq. & Cavill.) Vogt & Greuter

Some authors list additional two subspecies:

- Leucanthemum ircutianum subsp. cantabricum (Sennen) Vogt
- Leucanthemum ircutianum subsp. crassifolium (Lange) Vogt

== Description ==
This upright-growing herbaceous perennial daisy can reach from 20 to 80 centimetres of height. Its stem is usually firm, covered with short trichomes and only rarely spread out. Alternately arranged leaves are simple, they are sessile (without leafstalk) and serrated or shallowly lobed, while being lanceolate to spatulate in shape. There are no stipules.

Like other species of the family Asteraceae, L. ircutianum has flowers united into so-called pseudanthium (calathidium), with outer layer consisting of multiple whiteish strap-shaped ray flowers and inner area being of numerous yellowish circular-shaped tiny disc flowers. Bracts are present; the inflorescence is surrounded with lanceolate involucral leaves. Calyx is modified into a pappus.

This species ovary is inferior. Seed is enclosed into a brown dry fruit that is called an achene (more specifically cypsela). L. ircutianum is an entomophilous species, that attracts various insect pollinators with its big and noticeable inflorescences that imitate a single flower. This daisy flowers between May and October.

=== Similar species ===
Species L. ircutianum is very similar to L. vulgare. Besides some morphological (such as size, pollen) and ecological differences (eg. flowering time, type of habitats), species also differ in their genome, with L. ircutianum being tetraploid and L. vulgare exhibiting diploidy. They have mostly similar distribution area in Europe, but L. vulgare is more common in North America. In Canada, where both daisies can be found growing, L. ircutianum occurs primarily in the east parts of the country.

== Distribution and habitat ==
The oxeye daisy is a plant of Eurasia (mostly Europe, with some parts of Asia) and North America. European countries that fall into species' distribution area are Germany, France, former Soviet Union, Spain and Italy, as well as Albania, Austria, Baltic States, Belgium, Bulgaria, Finland, Great Britain, Portugal, Romania, Sardinia, Sicily, Sweden, Switzerland and former Yugoslavian countries. In America L. ircutianum can be found in both USA and eastern parts of Canada.

This daisy flower usually grows in various habitats, including some anthropologically modified urban areas. Commonly the species can be found on different meadows, forest edges, near paths and roads, as well as in various other ruderal landscapes.

The Raunkiær system classifies it as a hemicryptophyte species.

== Gallery ==
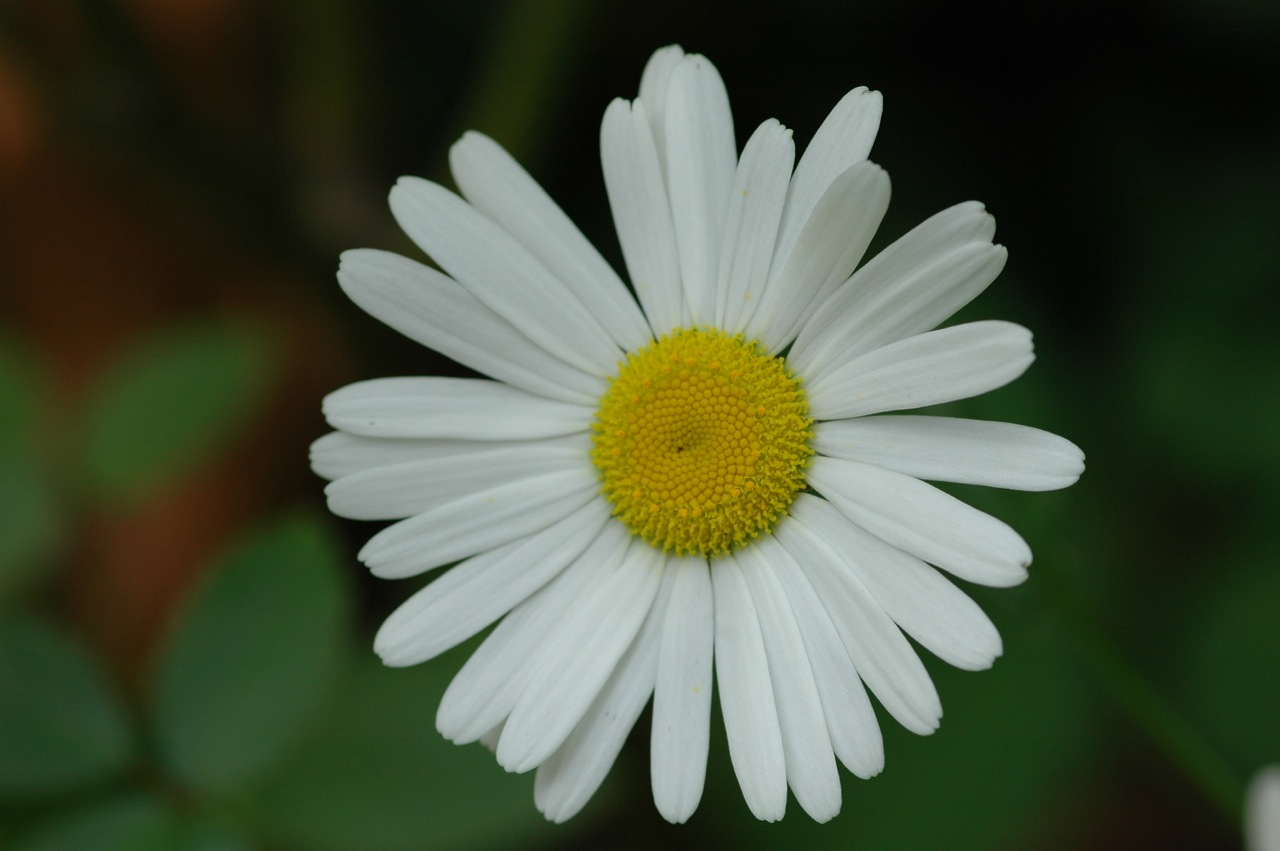

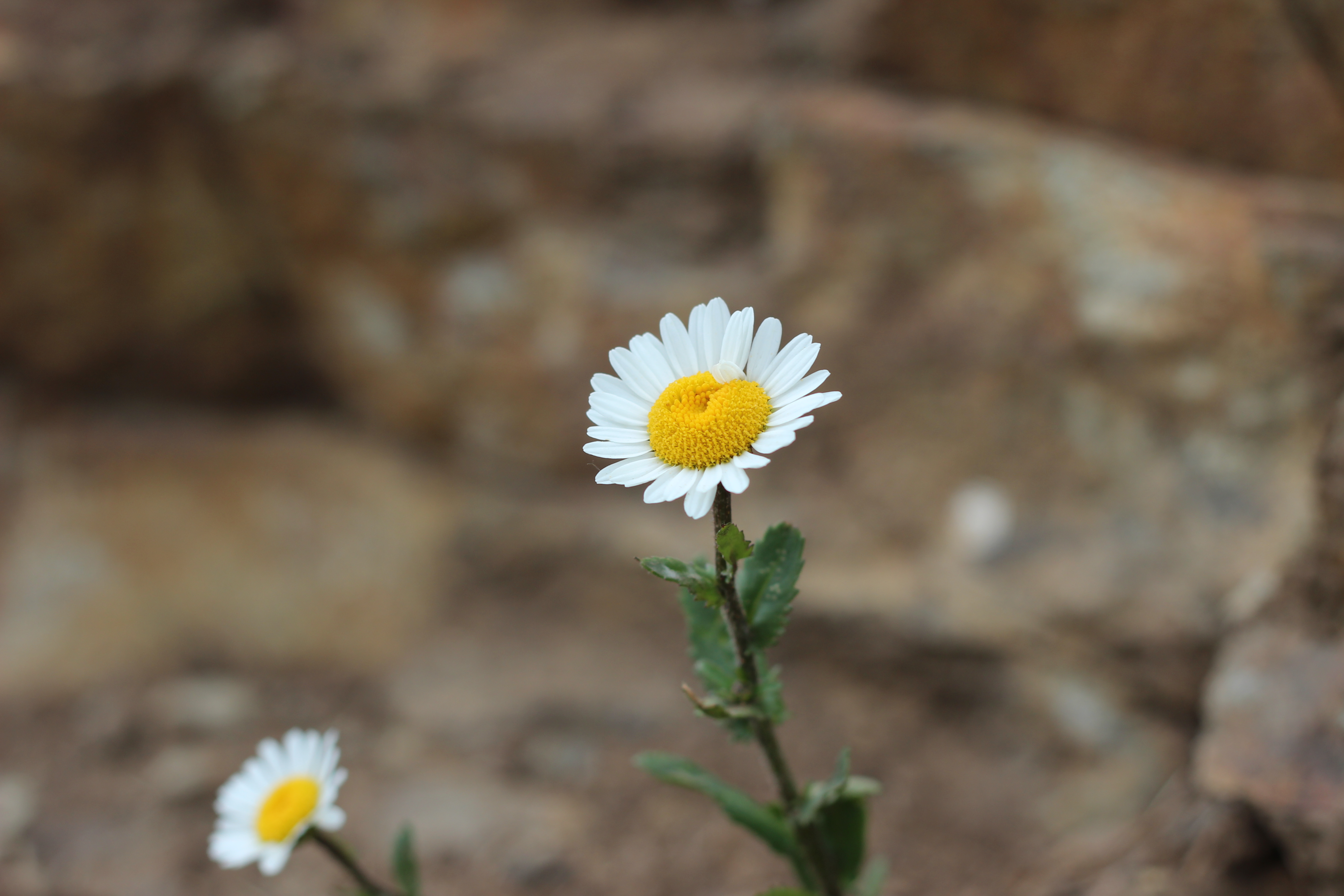

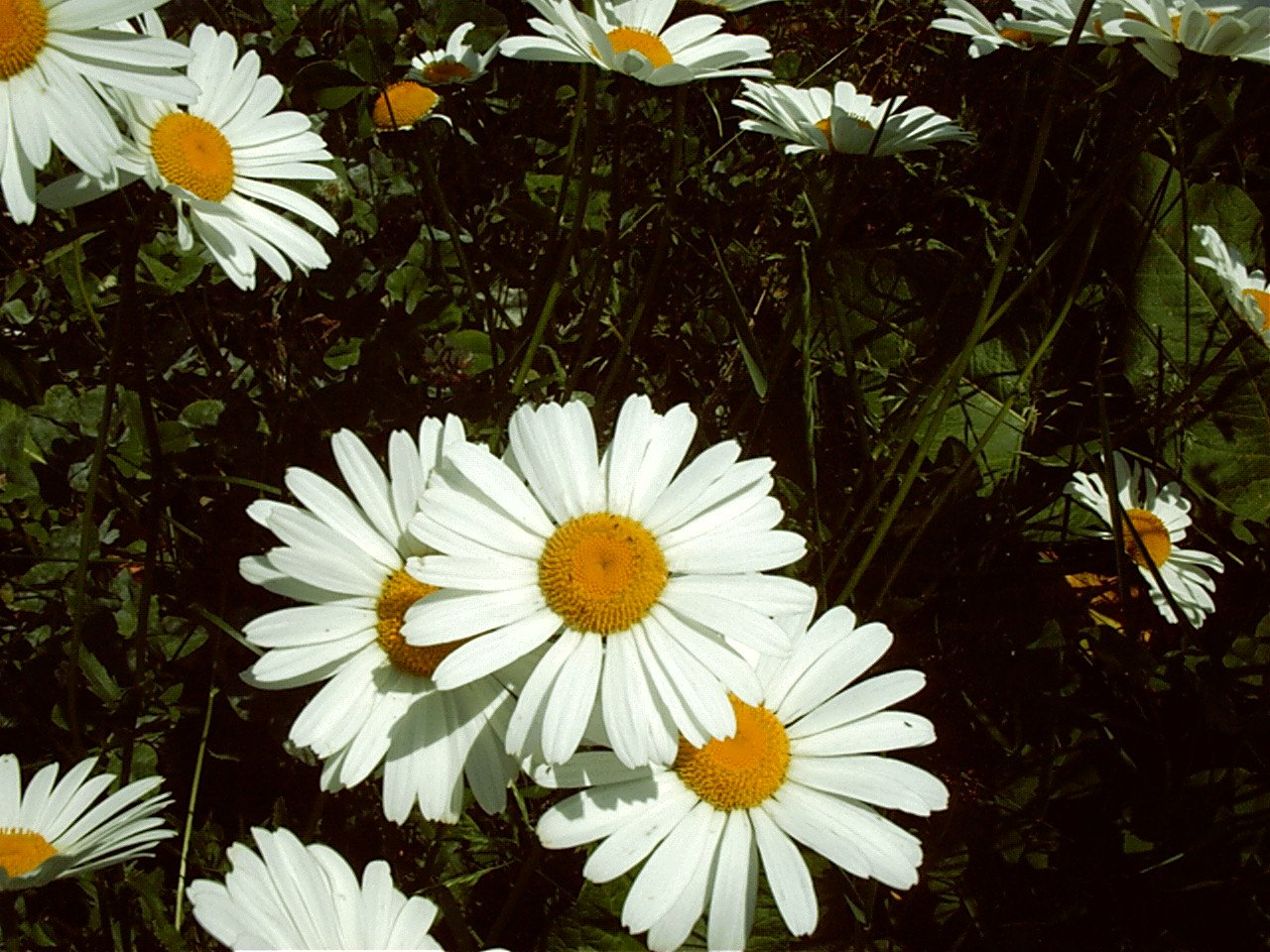

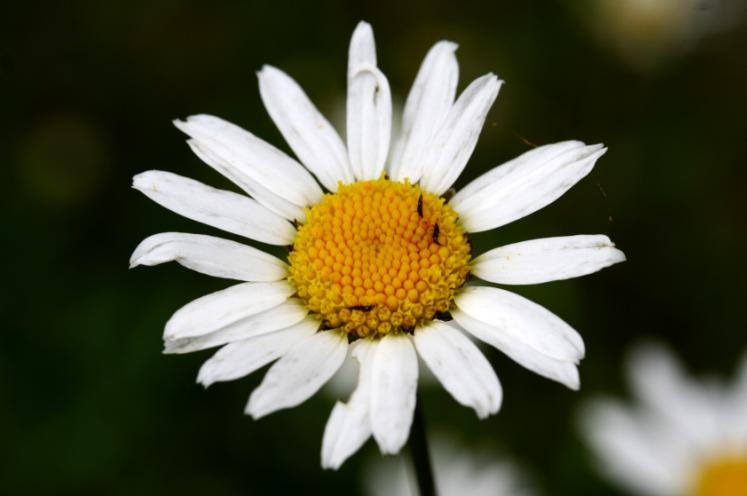

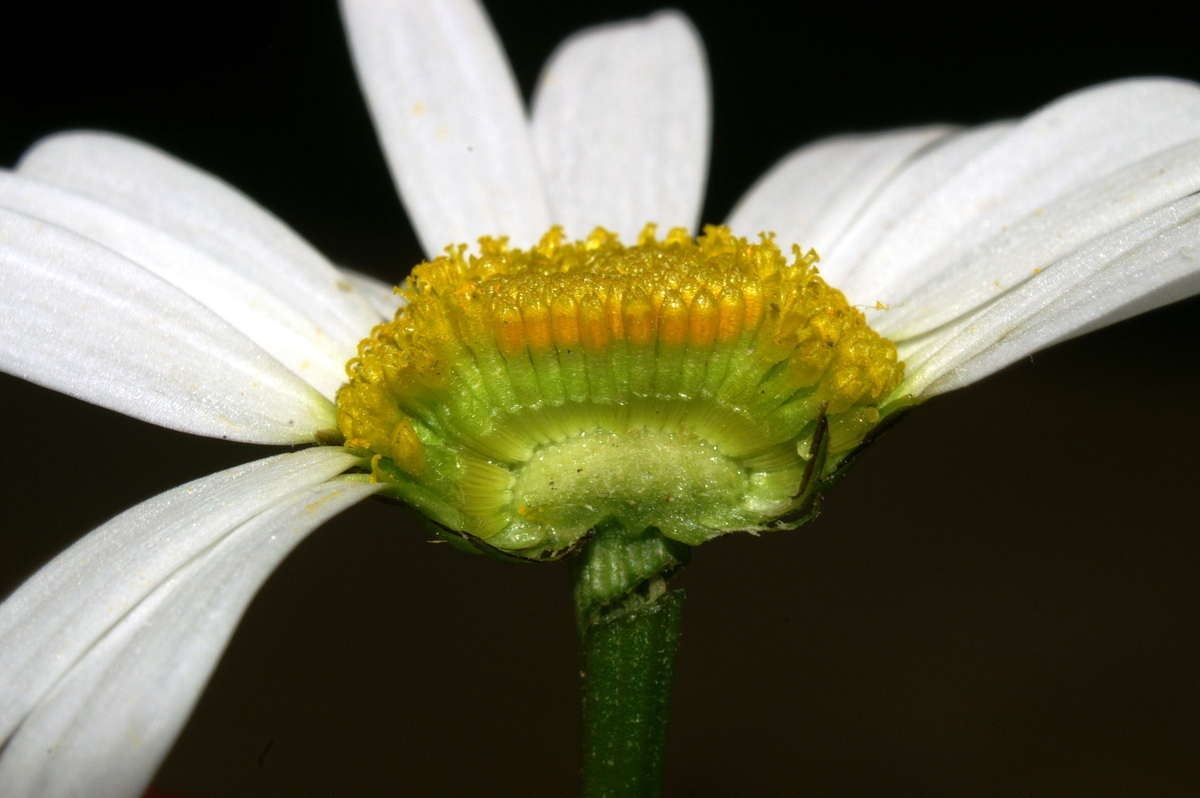

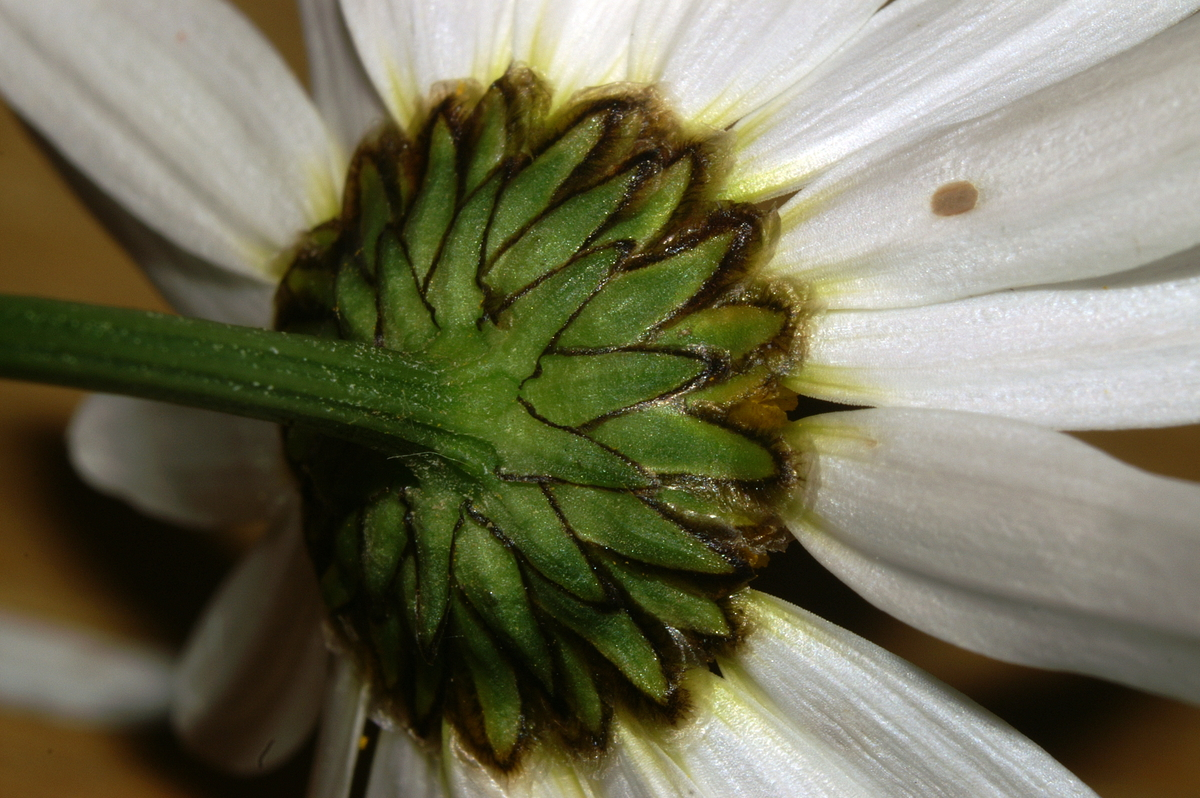

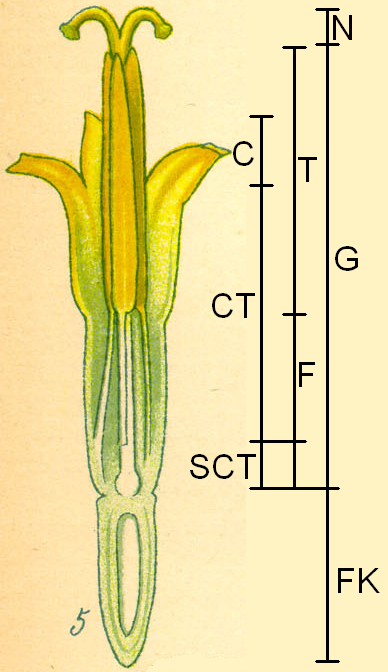
