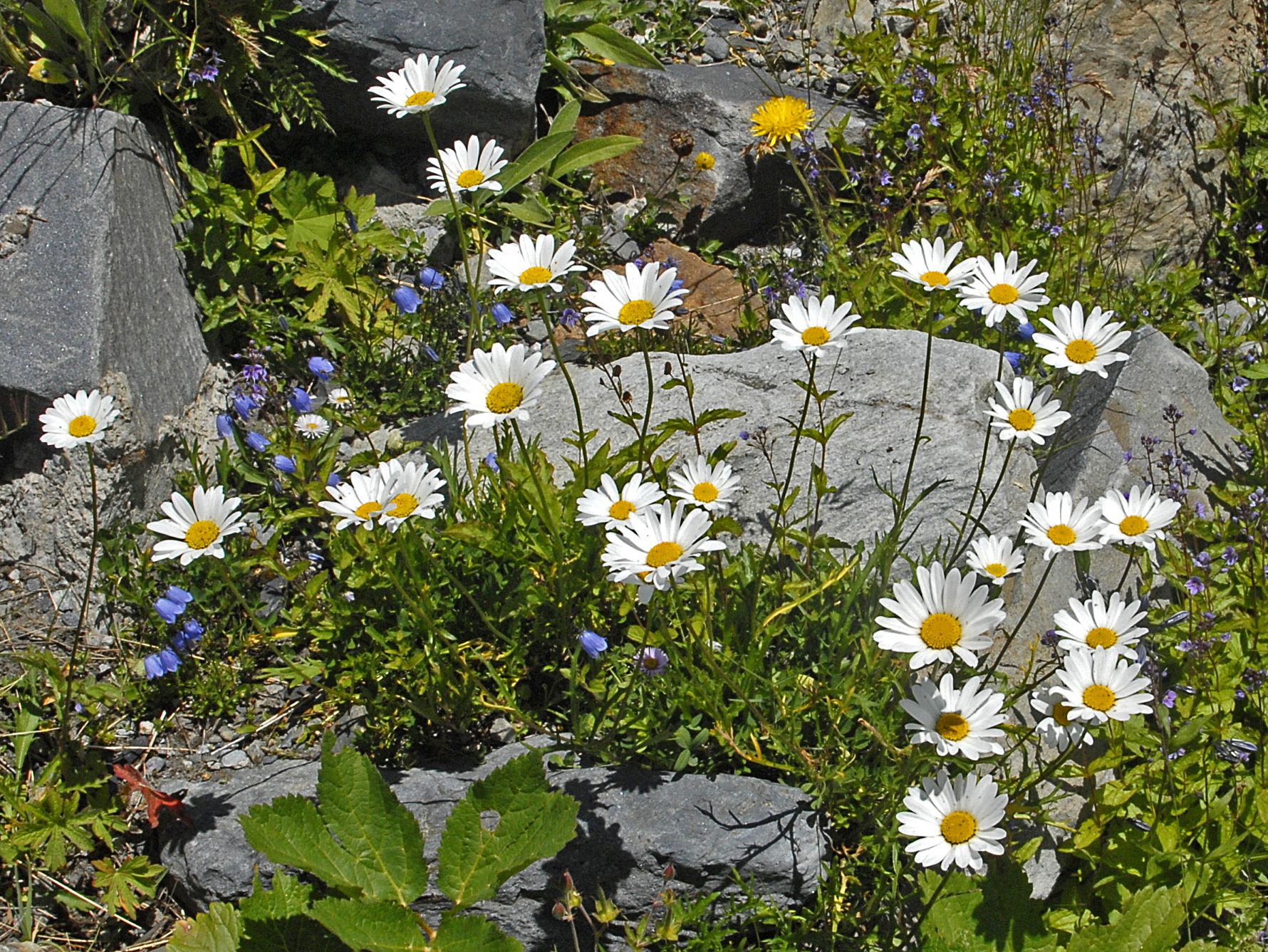
- Leucanthemum heterophyllum at the Giardino Botanico Alpino Chanousia

Scientific classification
- Kingdom: Plantae
- Clade: Tracheophytes
- Clade: Angiosperms
- Clade: Eudicots
- Clade: Asterids
- Order: Asterales
- Family: Asteraceae
- Genus: Leucanthemum
- Species: L. heterophyllum

Binomial name
- Leucanthemum heterophyllum (Willd.) DC.

Synonyms
- Chrysanthemum leucanthemum var. heterophyllum Fiori et Paol.; Chrysanthemum maximum Auct. p.p.

= Leucanthemum heterophyllum =

Species of flowering plant

Leucanthemum heterophyllum is a species of flowering plant in the aster family.

== Description ==
Leucanthemum heterophyllum can reach a height of 30–80 centimetres (12–31 in). This plant is perennial, glabrous or hairy. The stem is erect and robust, with a rosette of large basal leaves, petiolate, oblong, serrulate on the edges. It produces solitary white many-stellate flowers. The central disk flowers are tubular, hermaphrodite, yellow. They bloom from June to September.

== Distribution ==
This plant is native to the southern Europe, from the Iberian Peninsula and the Alps up to the Balkans and Caucasus.

== Habitat ==
This species lives in grasslands, meadows, shrubs, preferably on calcareous soils, at elevation of 1,000–2,200 metres (3,300–7,200 ft) above sea level.
