= National symbols of Latvia =

Symbols of Latvia are items or symbols that have symbolic meaning to, or represent, Latvia. These symbols are seen in official capacities, such as flags, coats of arms, postage stamps, and currency, and in URLs. They appear less formally as recurring themes in literature, art and folk art, heraldry, monuments, clothing, personal decoration, and as the names of parks, bridges, streets, and clubs. The less formal manifestations may be classified as national emblems.

During the occupation of Latvia by the Soviet Union and briefly by Nazi Germany during World War II, the anthem, coat of arms and flag were prohibited from display and the Soviet versions of the flag, coat of arms and the anthem were used during its rule as a Soviet republic. All national symbols of Latvia were reinstated in 1990 before Latvia restored its independence a year later which are considered the continuation of the Latvian state before its occupation in 1940. The public display of the Nazi swastika and the Soviet hammer and sickle along with other symbols associated with them are now banned in Latvia in 2014.

== Official symbols ==
=== Flag ===
The Flag of Latvia

The national flag of Latvia is a carmine red field with a narrow white stripe in the middle. The colour proportions of the flag of the Republic of Latvia is 2:1:2, and the ratio of the flag is 1:2.

The flag was created in 1917, inspired by a 13th-century legend from the Rhymed Chronicle of Livonia that a Latgalian leader was wounded in battle, and the edges of the white sheet in which he was wrapped were stained by his blood with the center stripe of the flag is left unstained. It was officially adopted in 1921, before the carmine specification of the color in 1922. The specification was made in order to establish a clear difference from the flag of Austria. The use of the flag was illegal after the country was occupied by the Soviet Union in 1940. The flag of Latvia was officially restored for use in 1990.

=== Coat of arms ===
The coat of arms of Latvia

The coat of arms of Latvia is used new symbols for the nation's freedom and elements from coats of arms of Polish and Swedish Livonia and the Duchy of Courland and Semigallia. It was adopted in 1921 along with the national flag, but abolished in 1940 after Soviet occupation started, and officially restored in 1990.

=== National Anthem ===
Instrumental version

Dievs, svētī Latviju! is the national anthem of Latvia. It was initially created in 1873 as a patriotic song, and in 1920 became the national anthem.

== Other symbols ==
Besides the official symbols, there are other symbols representing Latvia and its values:

- National animal – two-spot ladybird
- National bird – white wagtail
- National flower – ox-eye daisy
- National trees – small-leaved linden and European oak
- National mineral – amber

River Daugava is also regarded as an aesthetically and culturally important part of the Latvian nature, and poetically referred to as a mother figure (lv. māte-Daugava – mother-Daugava). The Freedom Monument is a representation of Latvian independence, whereas the summer solstice days Līgo and Jāņi are the national festival.
