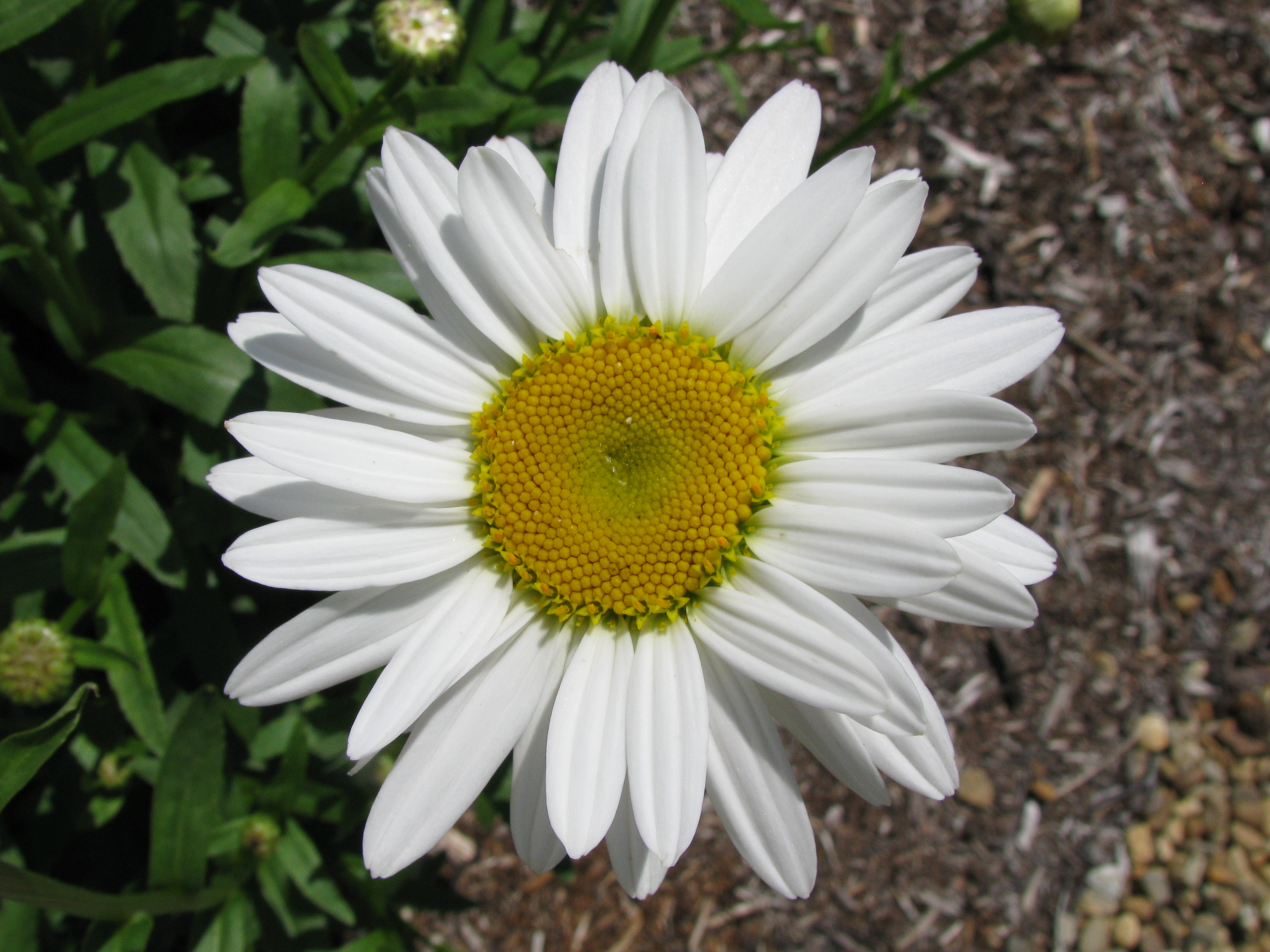
- Flower of the cultivar 'Becky'

Scientific classification
- Kingdom: Plantae
- Clade: Tracheophytes
- Clade: Angiosperms
- Clade: Eudicots
- Clade: Asterids
- Order: Asterales
- Family: Asteraceae
- Genus: Leucanthemum
- Species: L. × superbum

Binomial name
- Leucanthemum × superbum (Bergmans ex J.W.Ingram) D.H.Kent

= Leucanthemum × superbum =

Species of flowering plant

Stereo image
Left frame
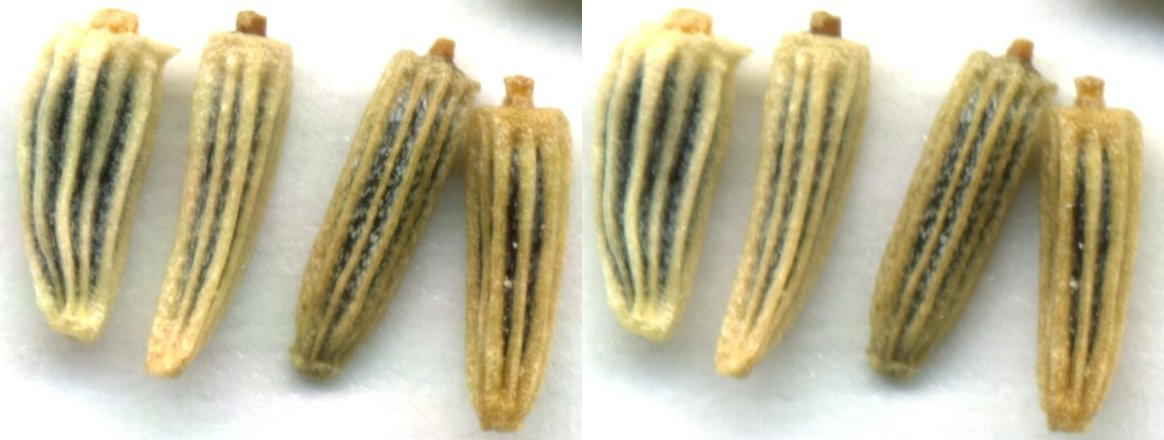
Right frame
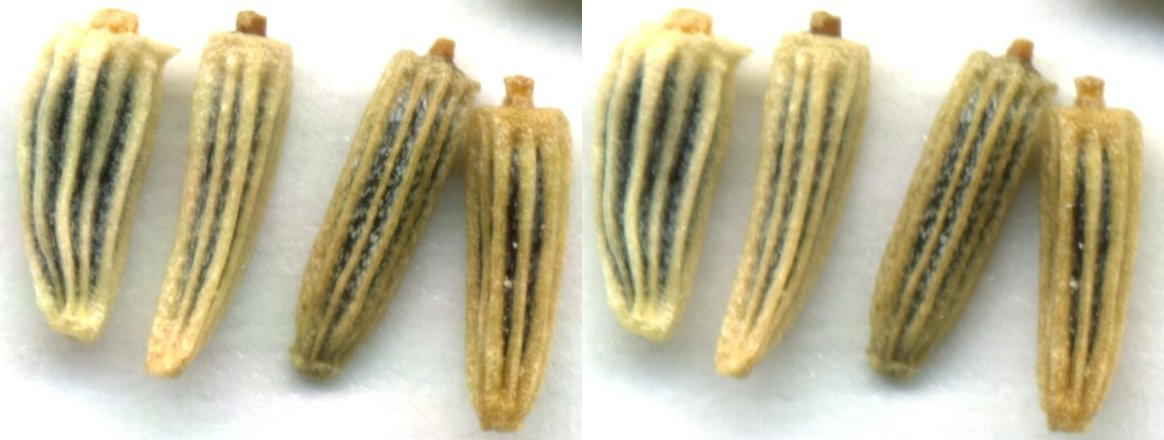
Parallel view
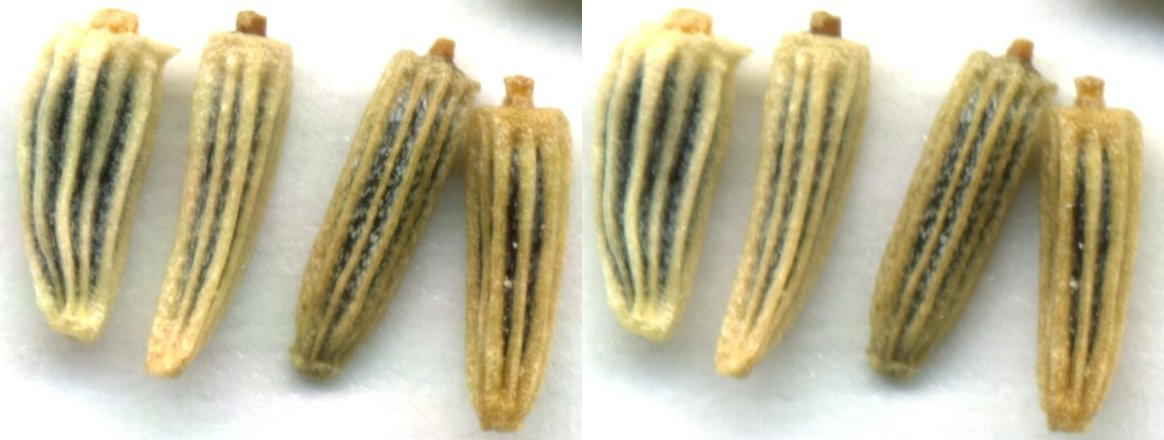
Cross-eye view
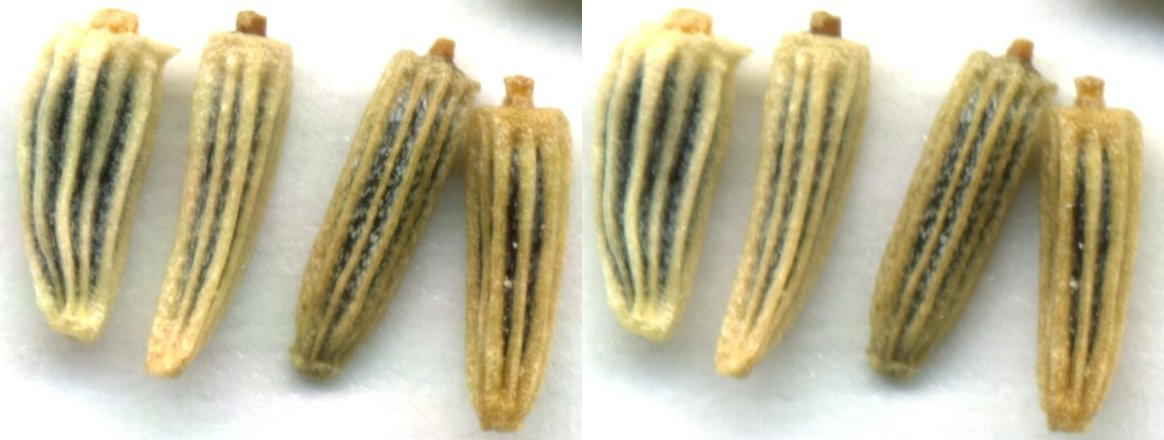

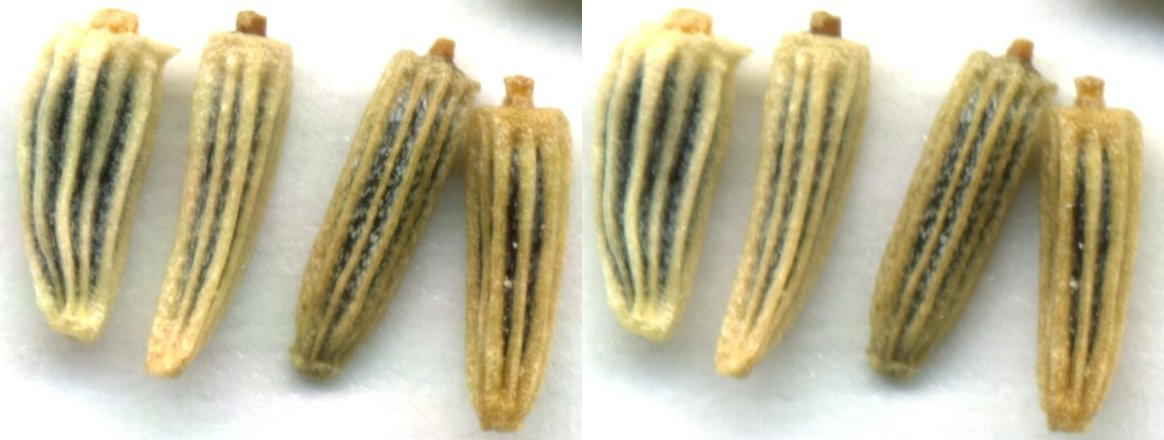
- Shasta Daisy seeds

Leucanthemum × superbum, the Shasta daisy, is a commonly grown flowering herbaceous perennial plant with the classic daisy appearance of white petals (ray florets) around a yellow disc, similar to the oxeye daisy Leucanthemum vulgare Lam, but larger.

It originated as a hybrid produced in 1890 by the American horticulturist Luther Burbank from a number of daisies. First, he crossed Leucanthemum vulgare with Leucanthemum maximum; this double hybrid was itself crossed with Leucanthemum lacustre. The resulting Leucanthemum triple hybrid was crossed with Nipponanthemum nipponicum, creating an intergeneric cross of species from three continents. It was named after Mount Shasta, because its petals were the color of the snow. Some members of the genus are considered noxious weeds, but the Shasta daisy remains a favorite garden plant.

Many cultivars are suitable for cut flowers, such as 'Becky', 'Esther Read', 'Silberprinzesschen' (Silver Princess), 'Snow Lady', 'Tinkerbell', 'Wirral Pride', 'Wirral Supreme'. The cultivars 'T.E. Killin' and 'Wirral Supreme' have gained the Royal Horticultural Society's Award of Garden Merit.
