= Bucculatrix argentisignella =

Scientific classification
- Kingdom: Animalia
- Phylum: Arthropoda
- Clade: Pancrustacea
- Class: Insecta
- Order: Lepidoptera
- Family: Bucculatricidae
- Genus: Bucculatrix
- Species: B. argentisignella

Binomial name
- Bucculatrix argentisignella Herrich-Schäffer, 1855

Synonyms
- Bucculatrix gracilella Frey, 1856

Species of moth

Bucculatrix argentisignella is a moth species in the family Bucculatricidae. It was first described by Gottlieb August Wilhelm Herrich-Schäffer in 1855 and is found in France and in disjunct populations in Central, Eastern and Northern Europe.

Adults exhibit sexual dimorphism.

The larvae feed on Leucanthemum vulgare. They mine the leaves of their host plant. Larvae can be found from May to June and again in July.
