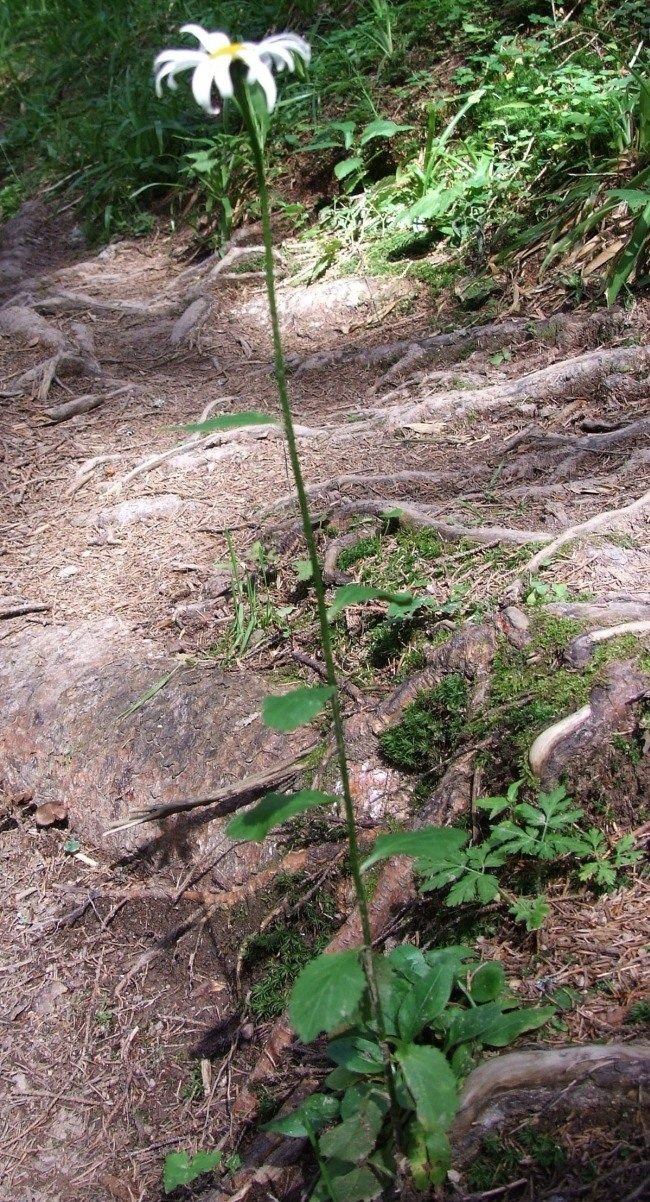

Scientific classification
- Kingdom: Plantae
- Clade: Tracheophytes
- Clade: Angiosperms
- Clade: Eudicots
- Clade: Asterids
- Order: Asterales
- Family: Asteraceae
- Genus: Leucanthemum
- Species: L. rotundifolium

Binomial name
- Leucanthemum rotundifolium (Waldst. & Kit.) DC.

= Leucanthemum rotundifolium =

Species of plant

Leucanthemum rotundifolium, the round-leaved daisy, is a species in the family Asteraceae. It is native to Eastern Europe and Asia.
