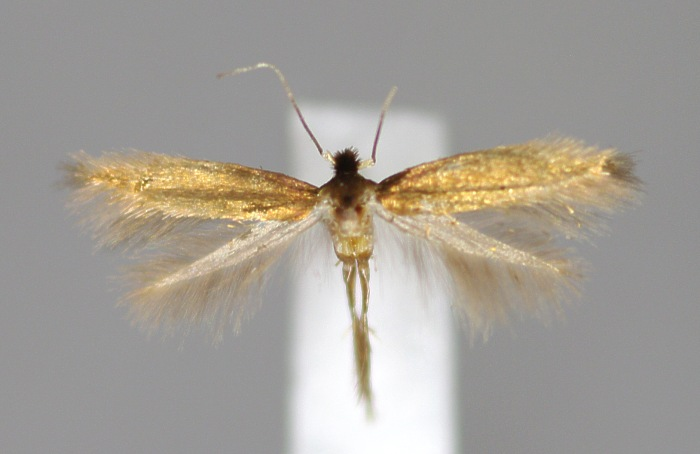

Scientific classification
- Kingdom: Animalia
- Phylum: Arthropoda
- Clade: Pancrustacea
- Class: Insecta
- Order: Lepidoptera
- Family: Bucculatricidae
- Genus: Bucculatrix
- Species: B. nigricomella

Binomial name
- Bucculatrix nigricomella (Zeller, 1839)

Synonyms
- Lyonetia nigricomella Zeller, 1839; Bucculatrix albipedella Hofmann, 1874

= Bucculatrix nigricomella =

Species of moth

Bucculatrix nigricomella is a species of moth of the family Bucculatricidae. It was first described in 1839 by Philipp Christoph Zeller. It is found in most of Europe (except the Balkan Peninsula).

The wingspan is 7–8 mm. The head is dark fuscous. Antennal eyecaps whitish, forewings shining greyish-bronzy, pairs of costal and dorsal undefined ochreous whitish spots before middle and at 2/3. Hindwings are rather dark grey. The larva is greenish or yellowish; head pale brown; segment 2. On the Continent ([Europe]) the usual form of the imago is almost unicolorous, the spots being nearly or quite obsolete, but this form does not seem to have occurred in England.

Adults are on wing from April to May and again in August. There are two generations per year.

The larvae feed on Leucanthemum vulgare. They mine the leaves of their host plant.

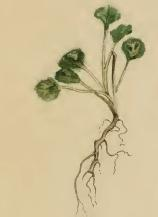
Plant of Chrysanthemum leucanthemum with mined leaves

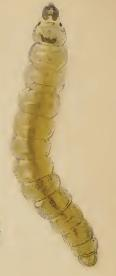
Mining larva

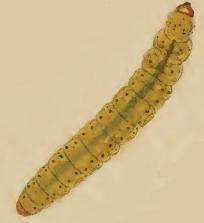
Externally feeding larva
