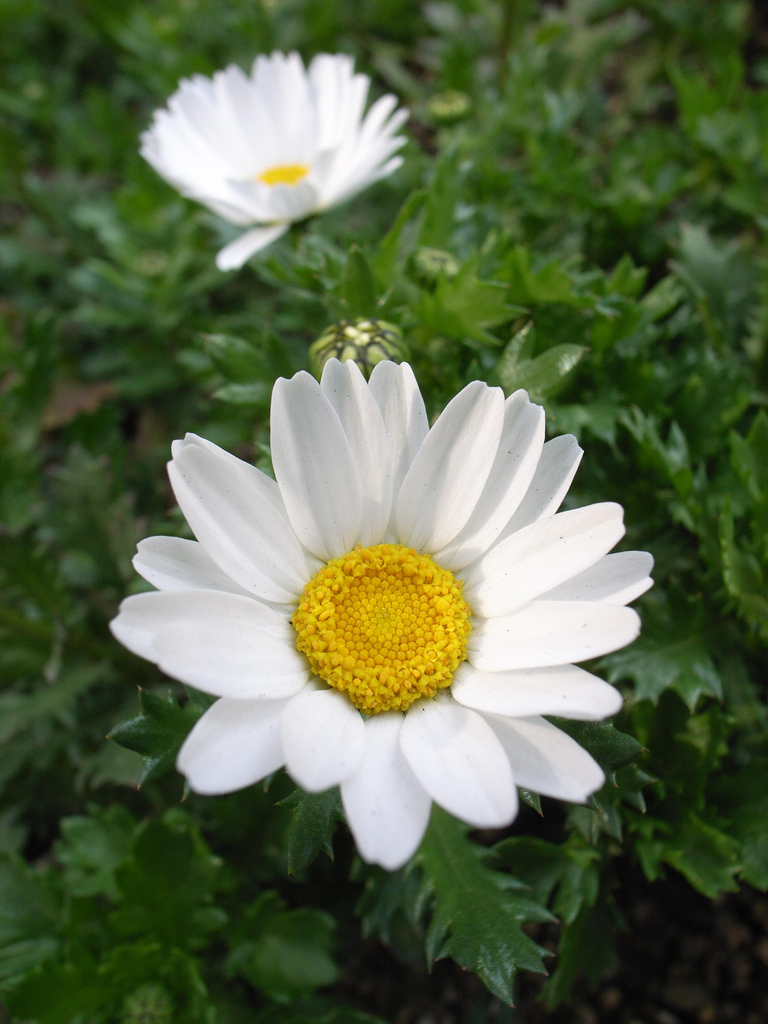
- Mauranthemum paludosum

Scientific classification
- Kingdom: Plantae
- Clade: Embryophytes
- Clade: Tracheophytes
- Clade: Angiosperms
- Clade: Eudicots
- Clade: Asterids
- Order: Asterales
- Family: Asteraceae
- Subfamily: Asteroideae
- Tribe: Anthemideae
- Genus: Mauranthemum; Vogt & Oberprieler

Type species
- Mauranthemum paludosum (Poir.) Vogt & Oberprieler

Synonyms
- Leucoglossum B.H. Wilcox, K. Bremer & Humphries 1993, illegitimate homonym not S.Imai 1942 (an ascomycete fungus)

= Mauranthemum =

Genus of flowering plants

Mauranthemum is a genus of flowering plants in the daisy family.

Species

- Mauranthemum decipiens (Pomel) Vogt & Oberpr. - Spain, Algeria, Morocco
- Mauranthemum gaetulum (Batt.) Vogt & Oberpr. - Algeria, Morocco
- Mauranthemum paludosum (Poir.) Vogt & Oberpr. - Spain, Balearic Islands, Morocco, Algeria, Libya, Tunisia
- Mauranthemum reboudianum (Pomel) Vogt & Oberpr. - Algeria, Morocco
