= Bucculatrix alpina =

Scientific classification
- Kingdom: Animalia
- Phylum: Arthropoda
- Clade: Pancrustacea
- Class: Insecta
- Order: Lepidoptera
- Family: Bucculatricidae
- Genus: Bucculatrix
- Species: B. alpina

Binomial name
- Bucculatrix alpina Frey, 1870

Synonyms
- Bucculatrix leucanthemella Constant, 1895

Species of moth

Bucculatrix alpina is a moth in the family Bucculatricidae. The species was first described by Heinrich Frey in 1870. It is found in southern France, Switzerland, Austria and Italy.

The wingspan is about 9 mm.

The larvae feed on Leucanthemum pallens and Staehelina dubia. They mine the leaves of their host plant. Larvae can be found in February and March.
