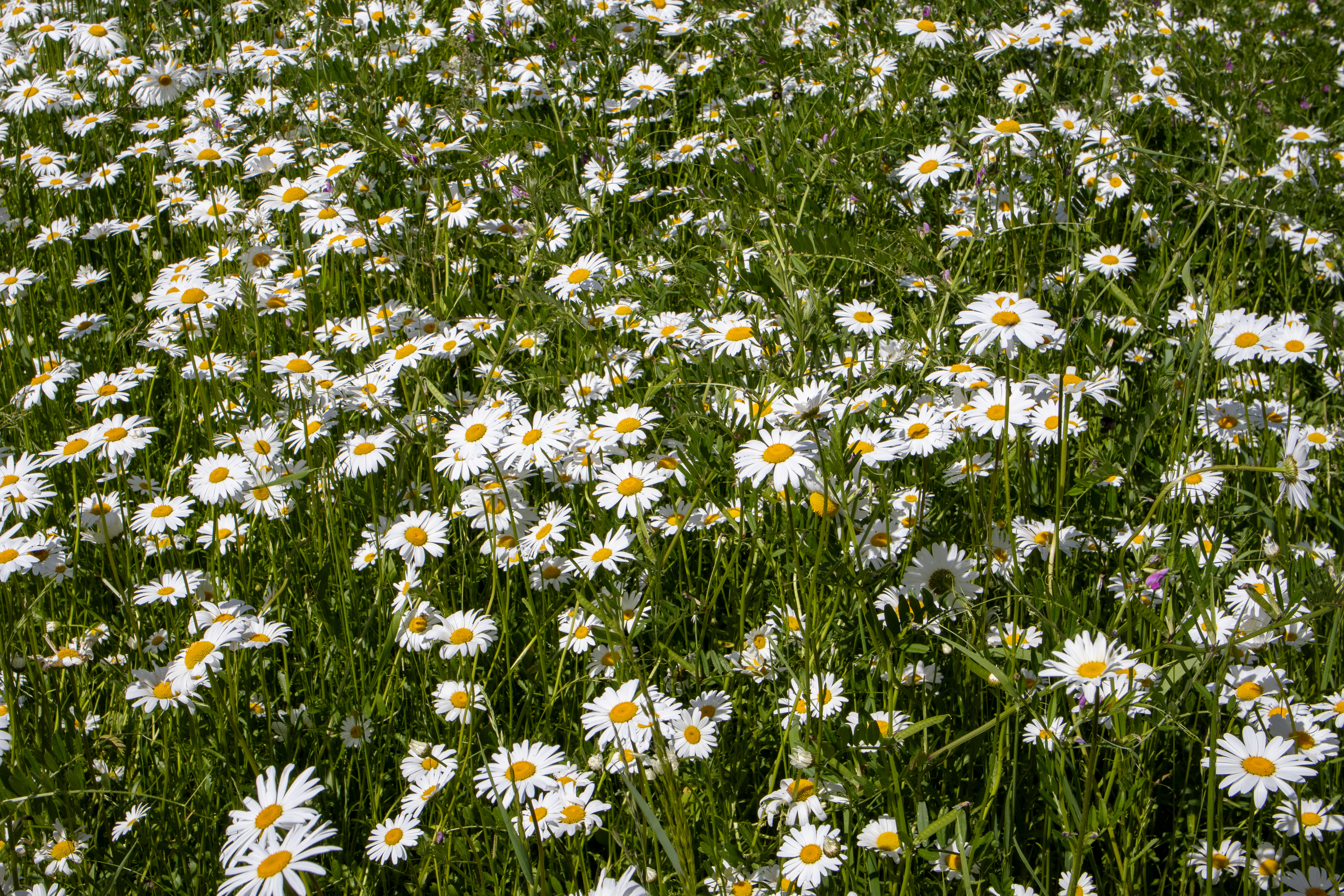

Scientific classification
- Kingdom: Plantae
- Clade: Tracheophytes
- Clade: Angiosperms
- Clade: Eudicots
- Clade: Asterids
- Order: Asterales
- Family: Asteraceae
- Genus: Leucanthemum
- Species: L. maximum

Binomial name
- Leucanthemum maximum (Ramond) DC.

= Leucanthemum maximum =

Species of flowering plant

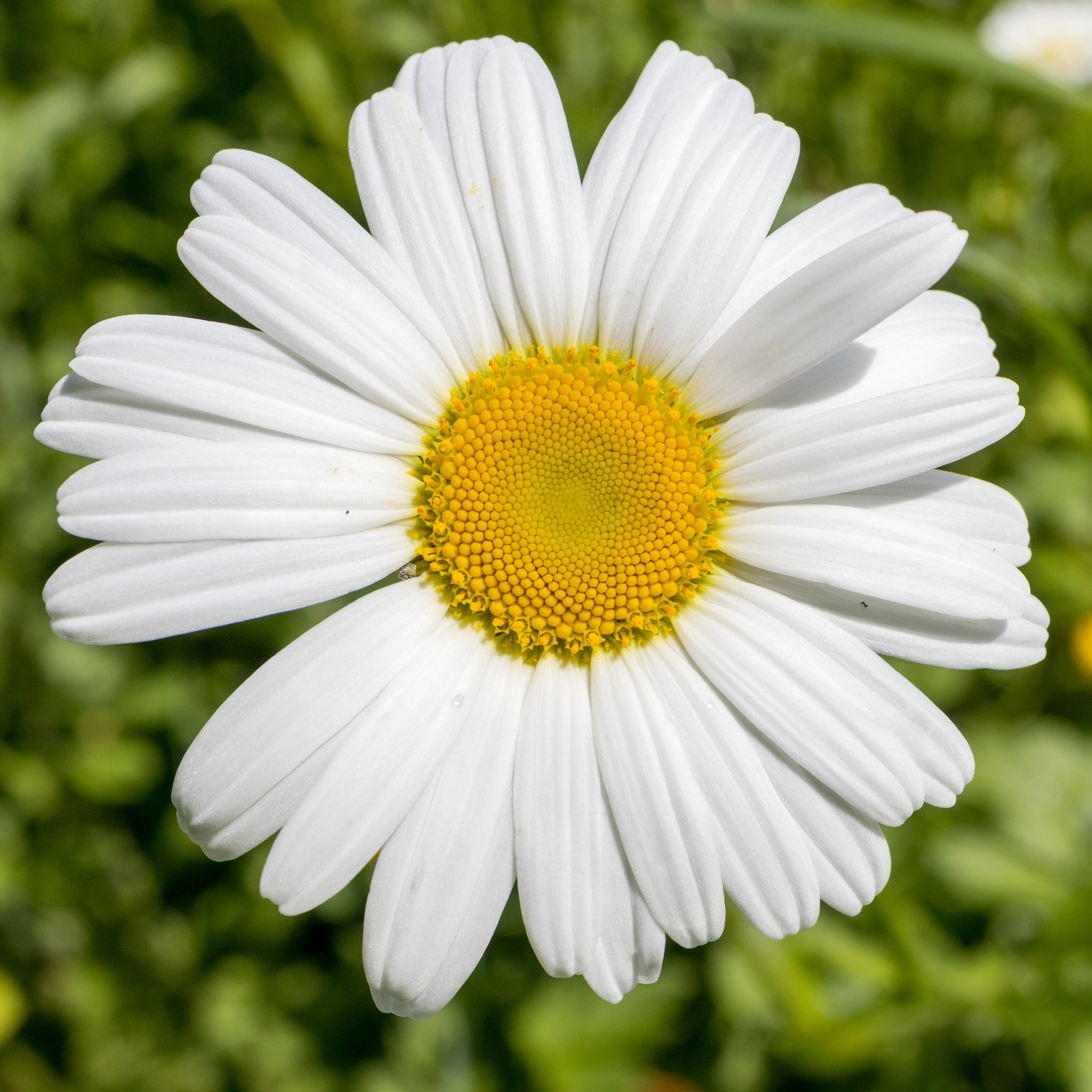
Leucanthemum maximum

Leucanthemum maximum, known as max chrysanthemum and Shasta daisy, is a species of flowering plant in the aster family.

== Range ==
It is native to France and Spain but it can be found growing wild in other parts of the world as an introduced species and sometimes a garden escapee.

== Description ==
It is a rhizomatous perennial herb growing 30 to 70 centimeters tall with many large serrated leaves around the base of the stem on winged petioles. There are smaller lance-shaped leaves alternately arranged along the stem. The inflorescence is generally a large, solitary flower head which may exceed 8 centimeters in diameter. It has a fringe of 20 to 30 white ray florets around a center of many densely packed yellow disc florets. The fruit is a small ribbed achene without a pappus.

== Taxonomy ==
This species is one of the wild chrysanthemums Luther Burbank crossed to produce the popular garden hybrid known as the Shasta daisy, Leucanthemum × superbum.
