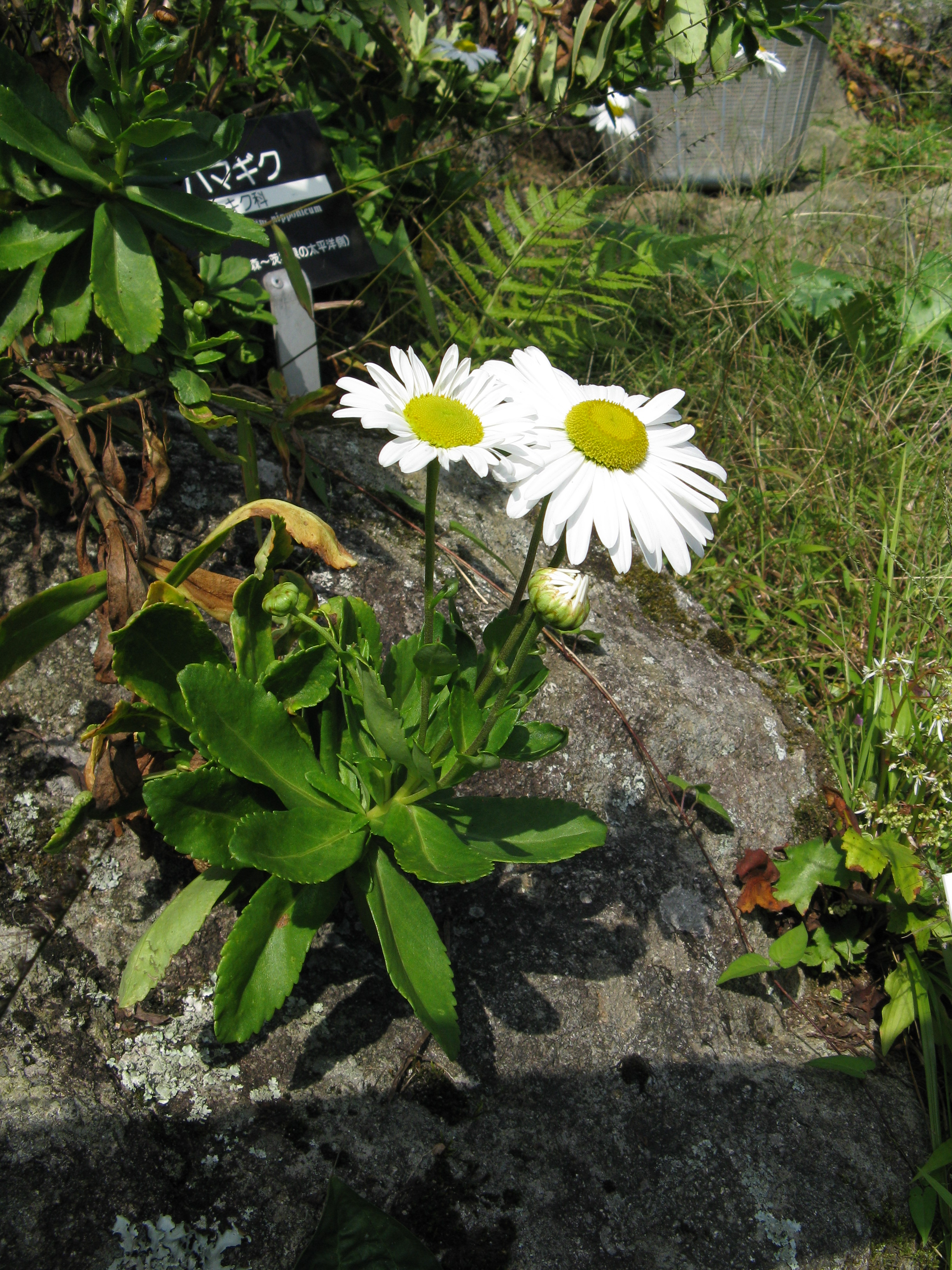

Scientific classification
- Kingdom: Plantae
- Clade: Embryophytes
- Clade: Tracheophytes
- Clade: Spermatophytes
- Clade: Angiosperms
- Clade: Eudicots
- Clade: Asterids
- Order: Asterales
- Family: Asteraceae
- Subfamily: Asteroideae
- Tribe: Anthemideae
- Genus: Nipponanthemum (Kitam.) Kitam.
- Species: N. nipponicum

Binomial name
- Nipponanthemum nipponicum (Franch. ex Maxim.) Kitam.

Synonyms
- Homotypic Synonyms: Chrysanthemum nipponicum (Franch. ex Maxim.) Sprenger; Chrysanthemum nipponicum (Franch. ex Maxim.) Matsum.; Leucanthemum nipponicum Franch. ex Maxim.; Tanacetum nipponicum (Franch. ex Maxim.) Kitam.

= Nipponanthemum =

Genus of flowering plants

Nipponanthemum nipponicum, commonly called Nippon daisy or Montauk daisy, is a species of flowering plant in the family Asteraceae. It is native to coastal regions of Japan but cultivated as an ornamental in other regions. It is now naturalized as an escapee along seashores in New York and New Jersey. It is the only species in the genus Nipponanthemum, formerly considered part of Chrysanthemum.

Nipponanthemum nipponicum is a shrub up to 100 cm (40 inches) tall. Most of the alternate leaves are clustered near the top of the stem. Flower heads are up to 8 cm (3 inches) across and are borne singly. Ray flowers are white, disc flowers usually yellow but sometimes red or purple.
