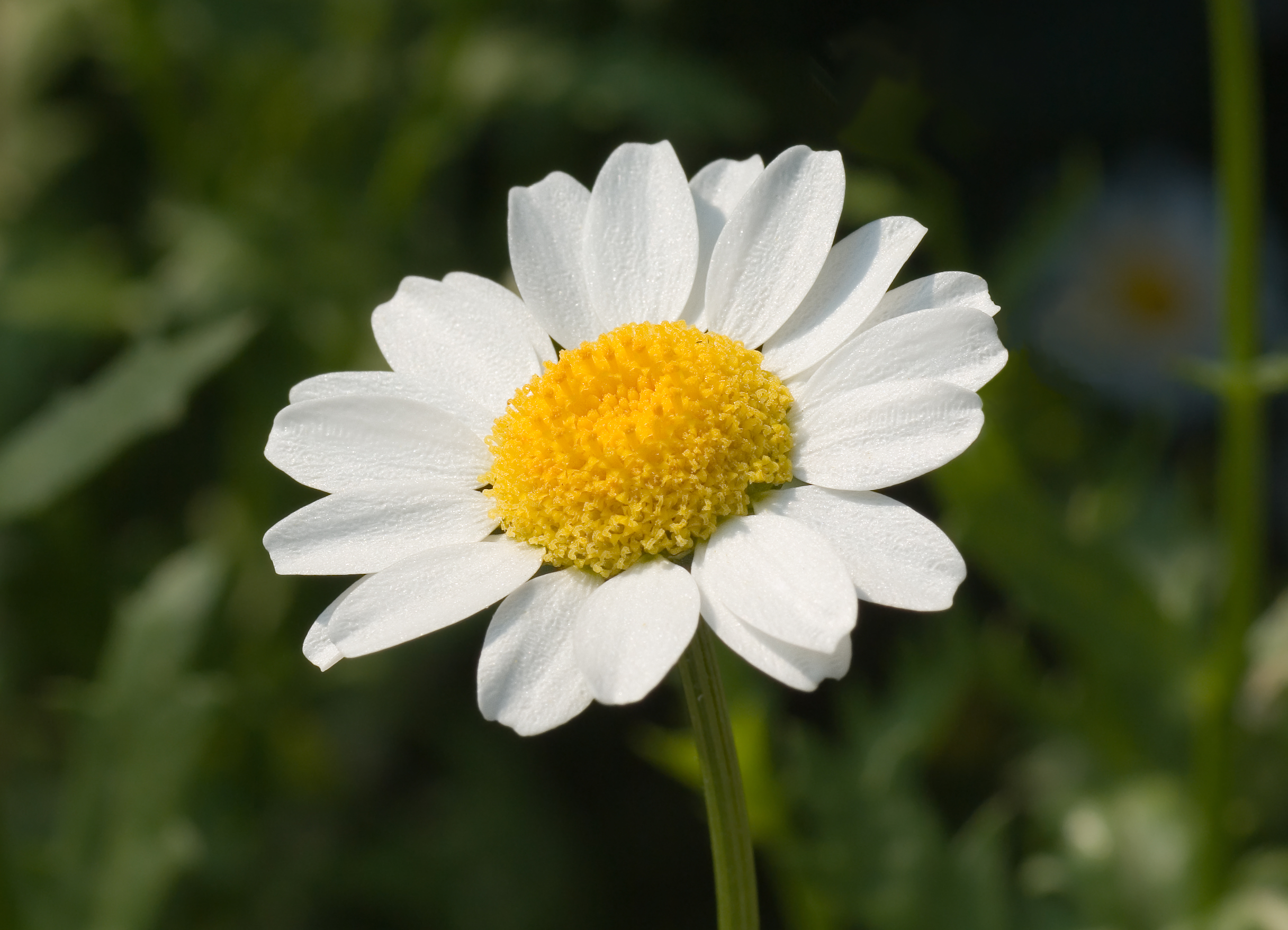

Scientific classification
- Kingdom: Plantae
- Clade: Tracheophytes
- Clade: Angiosperms
- Clade: Eudicots
- Clade: Asterids
- Order: Asterales
- Family: Asteraceae
- Genus: Mauranthemum
- Species: M. paludosum

Binomial name
- Mauranthemum paludosum (Poir.) Vogt & Oberpr. (1995)
- Mauranthemum paludosum subsp. ebusitanum (Vogt) Vogt & Oberpr.; Mauranthemum paludosum subsp. paludosum

Synonyms
- Chrysanthemum paludosum Poir. (1789); Leucanthemum paludosum (Poir.) Bonnet & Barratte (1896); Leucoglossum paludosum (Poir.) B.H.Wilcox, K.Bremer & Humphries (1993)

= Mauranthemum paludosum =

Species of flowering plant

Mauranthemum paludosum (formerly Chrysanthemum paludosum and Leucanthemum paludosum), commonly known as creeping daisy or mini marguerite, is a perennial plant of the family Asteraceae.

== Description ==
A perennial, the plant height is about 15 cm to 25 cm. It is a dwarf and is an ornamental plant. Also grown as a cool season annual plant, the flower's inflorescences are small flower heads with white ligules arranged around the yellow centre. Its green leaves are coarse, leathery and rather greyish 125 mm (5 in) long or shorter. The flowers open when the sun shines on them.

== Distribution ==
Mauranthemum paludosum is native to the western Mediterranean, including Algeria, Morocco, and Tunisia, eastern and southern Spain, and the Balearic Islands. It is widely distributed along the Mediterranean coast.

== Subspecies ==
Two subspecies are accepted.

- Mauranthemum paludosum subsp. ebusitanum (Vogt) Vogt & Oberpr. – Balearic Islands
- Mauranthemum paludosum subsp. paludosum – eastern and southern Spain, Algeria, Morocco, and Tunisia

== Cultivation ==
Tolerant of many soils and requiring full sun, it is usually planted in rock gardens and border fronts, and can be ideal for all sorts of containers.

== See also ==
- Argyranthemum, similar looking plant of different genus or 'true daisies'
