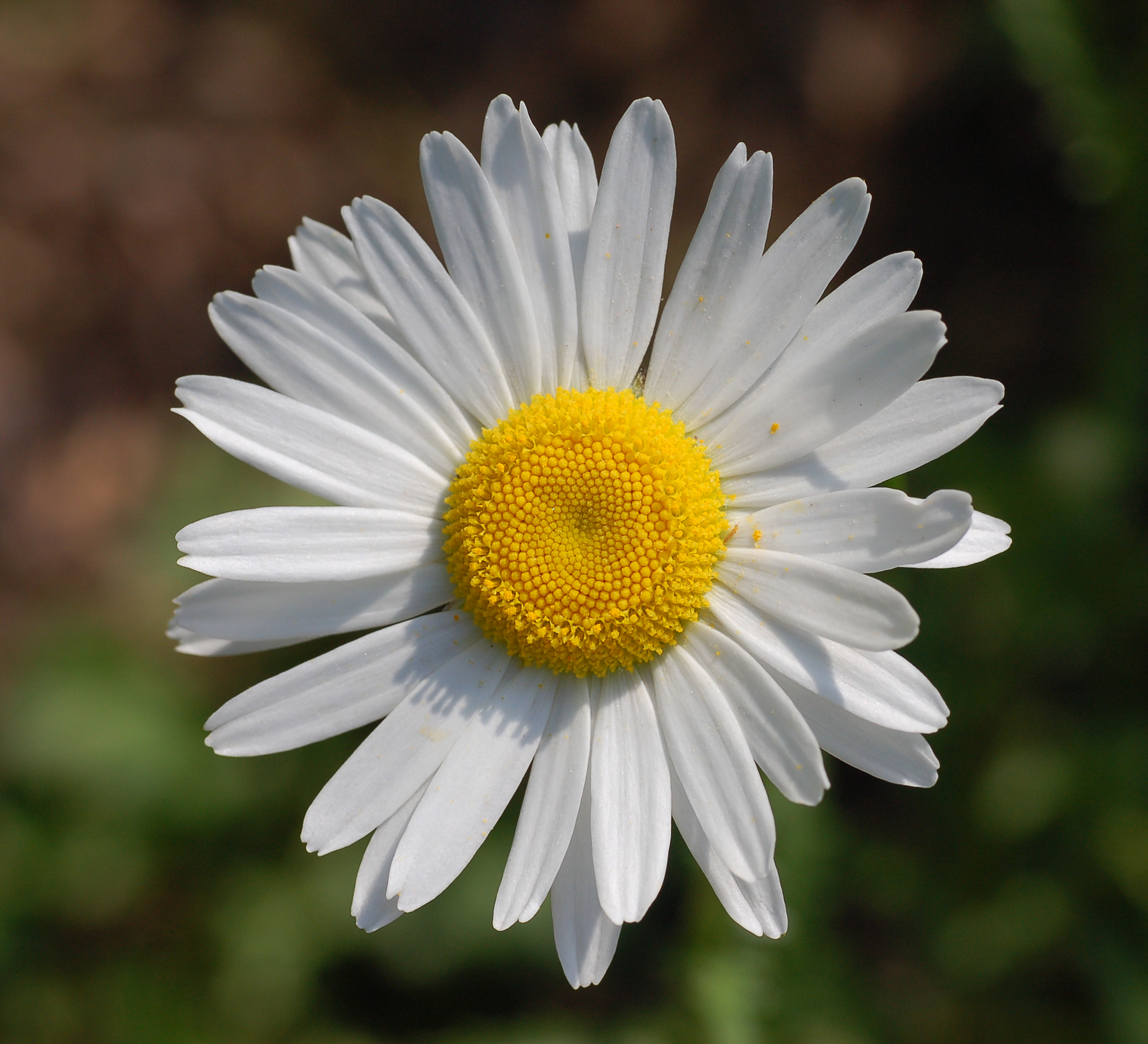

Scientific classification
- Kingdom: Plantae
- Clade: Tracheophytes
- Clade: Angiosperms
- Clade: Eudicots
- Clade: Asterids
- Order: Asterales
- Family: Asteraceae
- Genus: Leucanthemum
- Species: L. vulgare

Binomial name
- Leucanthemum vulgare Lam.

Synonyms
- List of synonyms: Bellis major Garsault nom. inval.; Chamaemelum leucanthemum (L.) E.H.L.Krause; Chrysanthemum dentatum Gilib. nom. inval.; Chrysanthemum ircutianum Turcz.; Chrysanthemum lanceolatum Pers.; Chrysanthemum lanceolatum Vest; Chrysanthemum leucanthemum L.; Chrysanthemum montanum Willd. nom. illeg.; Chrysanthemum praecox (M.Bieb.) DC.; Chrysanthemum pratense Salisb.; Chrysanthemum sylvestre Willd.; Chrysanthemum vulgare (Lam.) Gaterau; Leucanthemum ageratifolium Pau; Leucanthemum eliasii (Sennen & Pau) Sennen & Pau; Leucanthemum lanceolatum DC.; Leucanthemum leucanthemum (L.) Rydb. nom. illeg.; Leucanthemum praecox (Horvatić) Villard; Matricaria leucanthemum (L.) Desr.; Matricaria leucanthemum (L.) Scop.; Pontia heterophylla (Willd.) Bubani; Pontia vulgaris Bubani; Pyrethrum leucanthemum (L.) Franch.; Tanacetum leucanthemum (L.) Sch.Bip.

= Leucanthemum vulgare =

Species of flowering plant

Leucanthemum vulgare, commonly known as the ox-eye daisy, oxeye daisy, dog daisy, marguerite (French: Marguerite commune, "common marguerite") and other common names, is a widespread flowering plant native to Europe and the temperate regions of Asia, and an introduced plant to North America, Australia and New Zealand.

== Description ==
Leucanthemum vulgare is a perennial herb that grows to a height of 80 cm (31 in) and has a creeping underground rhizome. The lower parts of the stem are hairy, sometimes densely hairy but more or less glabrous in the lower parts. The largest leaves are at the base of the plant and are 40–150 mm (1.6–5.9 in) long, about 50 mm (2.0 in) wide and have a petiole. These leaves have up to 15 teeth, or lobes, or both, on the edges. The leaves decrease in size up the stem, the upper leaves, up to 75 mm (3.0 in) long, lack a petiole and are deeply toothed.

The plant bears up to three "flowers" like those of a typical daisy. Each is a "head" or capitulum 20–75 mm (0.79–2.95 in) wide. Each head has between fifteen and forty white ray florets 10–20 mm (0.39–0.79 in) long, surrounding the yellow disc florets. Below the head is an involucre of glabrous green bracts 7–10 mm (0.28–0.39 in) long with brownish edges. Flowering occurs from May to October. The seed-like achenes are 1–3 mm (0.039–0.118 in) long and have ten "ribs" along their edges but lack a pappus.

Ox-eye daisy is similar to shasta daisy (Leucanthemum × superbum) which has larger flower heads (50–120 mm (2.0–4.7 in) wide) and to stinking chamomile (Anthemis cotula) which has smaller heads (15–30 mm (0.59–1.18 in) wide). L. maximum is also similar, usually with rays 20–30 mm (0.79–1.18 in) in length.

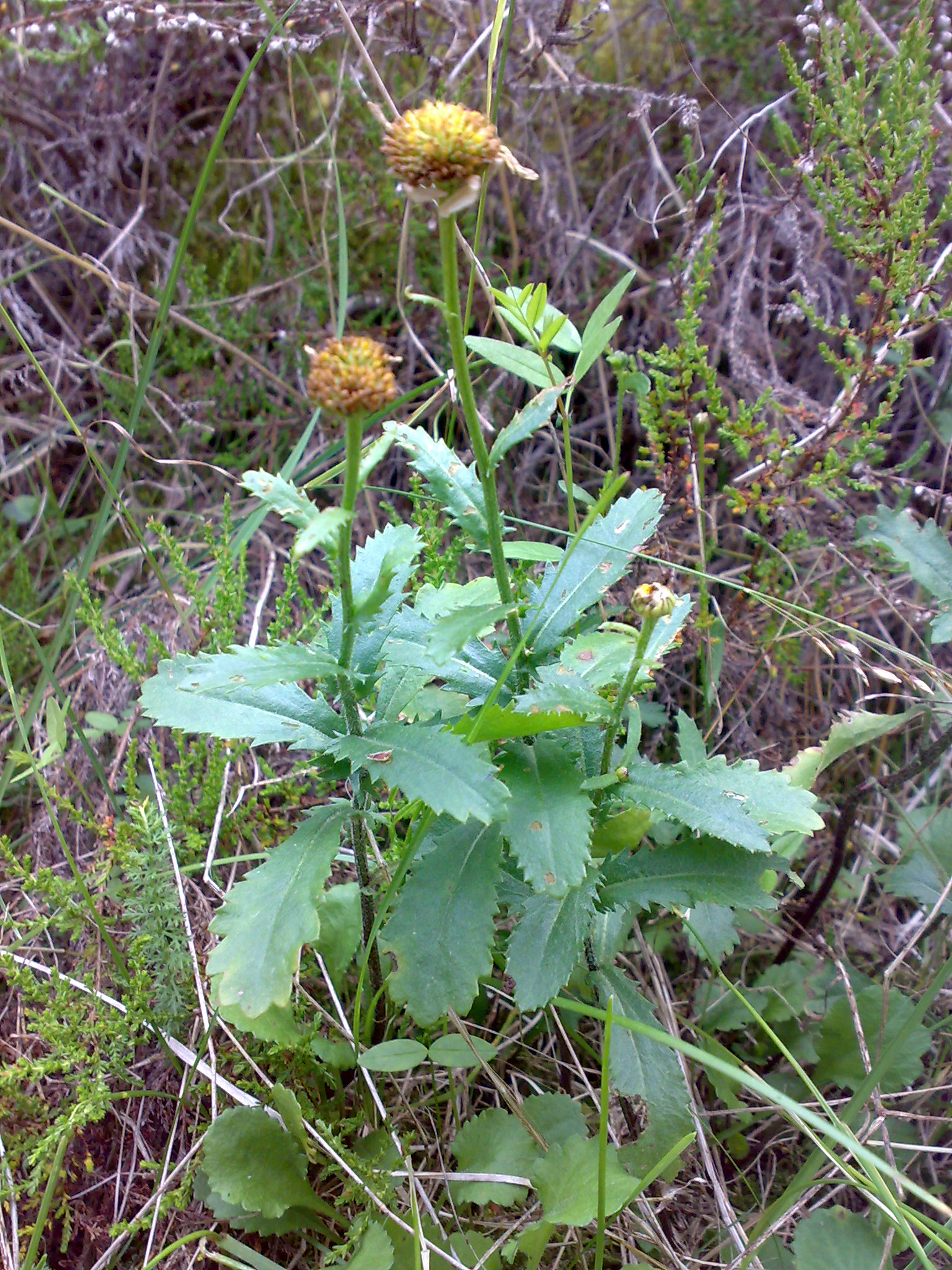
Plant after flowering

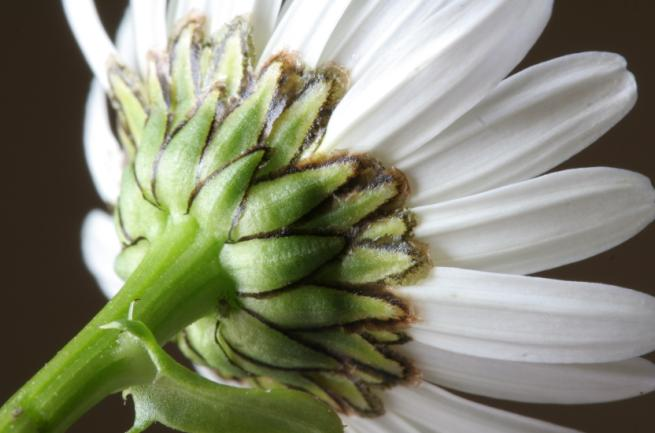
Involucral bracts of capitulum

== Taxonomy ==
L. vulgare was first formally described in 1778 by Jean-Baptiste Lamarck, who published the description in Flore françoise. It is also known by the common names ox-eye daisy, dog daisy, field daisy, Marguerite, moon daisy, moon-penny, poor-land penny, poverty daisy and white daisy.

The species was formerly described as part of the Chrysanthemum genus.

== Distribution and habitat ==
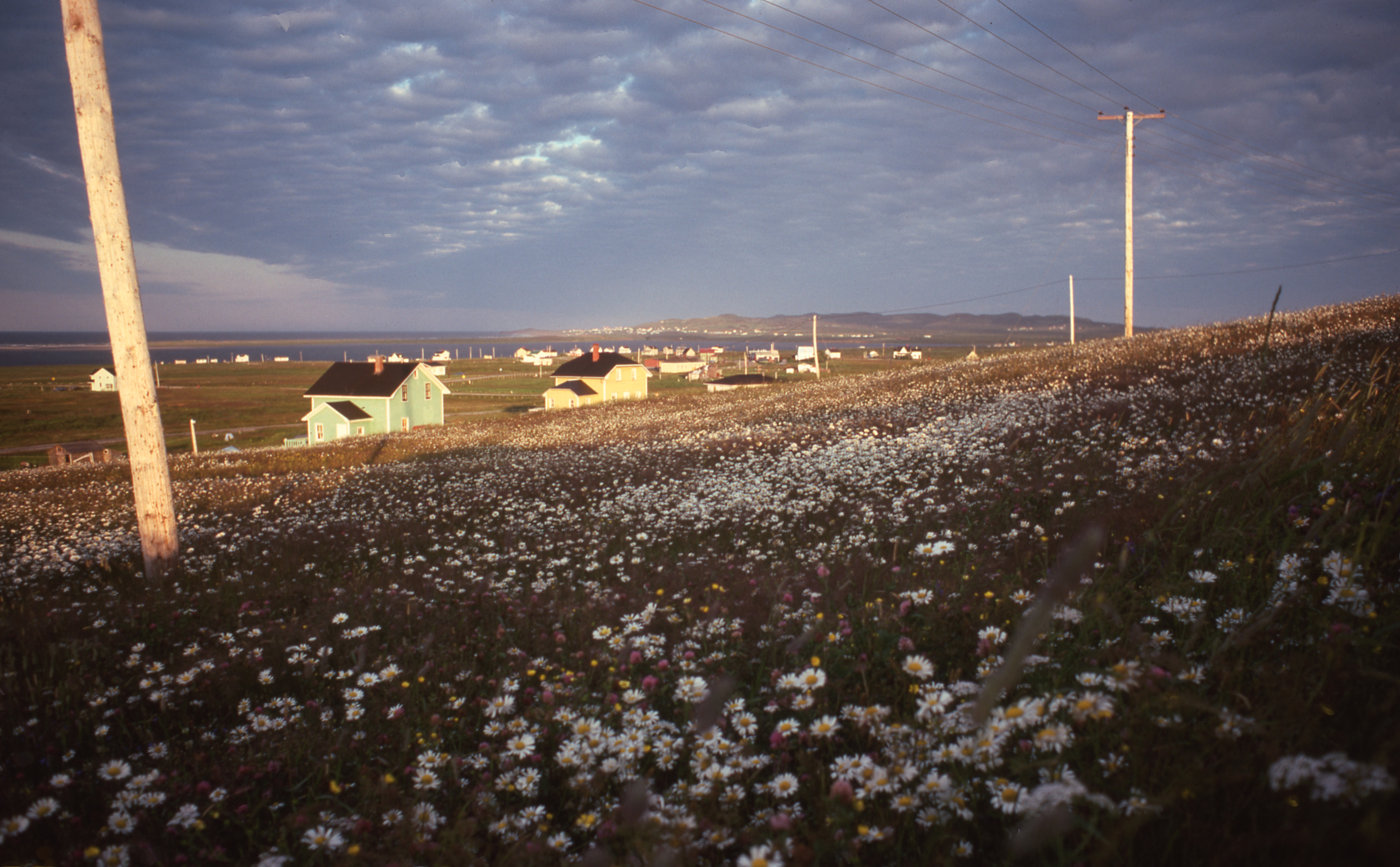
Leucanthemum L., field in Magdalen Island, Canada

The species is native to Europe, and to Turkey and Georgia in Western Asia. It is a typical grassland perennial wildflower, growing in a variety of plant communities including meadows and fields, under scrub and open-canopy forests, and in disturbed areas. The species is widely naturalised in many parts of the world, including North America, and is considered to be an invasive species in more than forty countries. It grows in temperate regions where average annual rainfall exceeds 750 mm (30 in), and often where soils are heavy and damp. It is often a weed of degraded pastures and roadsides.

== Ecology ==
The species spreads by seeds and by shallow, creeping rhizomes. A mature plant can produce up to 26,000 seeds that are spread by animals, vehicles, water and contaminated agricultural produce, and some seeds remain viable for up to nearly forty years. It is not palatable to cattle and reduces the amount of quality pasture available for grazing. In native landscapes such as the Kosciuszko National Park in Australia, dense infestation can exclude native plants, causing soil erosion and loss of soil organic matter.

This plant was top-ranked for pollen production per floral unit sampled at the level of the entire capitulum, with a value of 15.9 ± 2 μL, in a UK study of meadow flowers.

=== As an invasive species ===
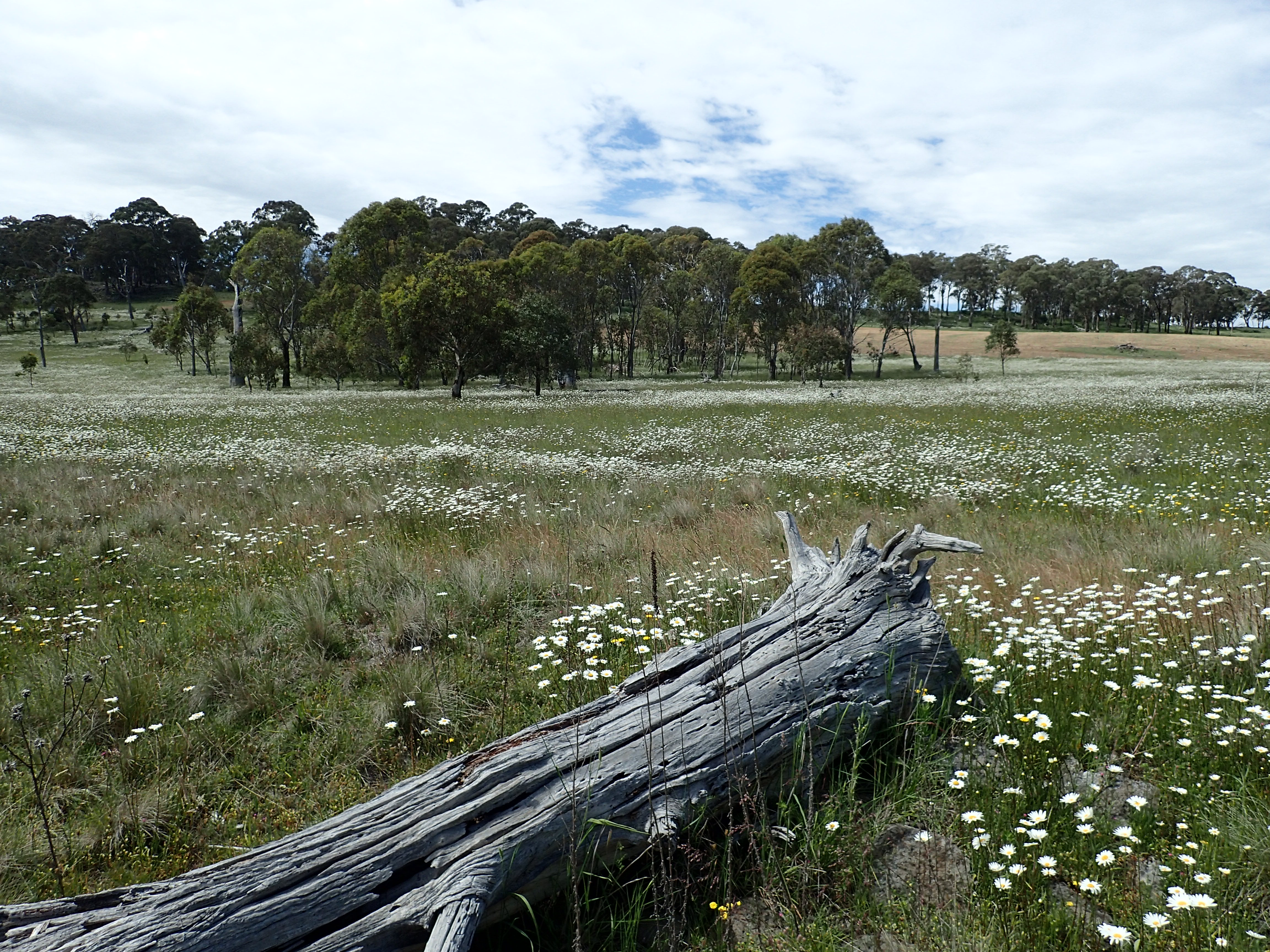
Infestation in native pasture near Guyra in Australia

Leucanthemum vulgare is one of the most widespread weeds in the Anthemideae. It became an introduced species via gardens into natural areas in parts of Canada, the United States, Australia, and New Zealand. In some habitats it forms dense colonies displacing native plants and modifying existing communities.

The plant commonly invades lawns, and is difficult to control or eradicate, since a new plant can regenerate from rhizome fragments and is a problem in pastures where beef and dairy cattle graze, as usually they will not eat it, thus enabling it to spread; cows who do eat it produce milk with an undesirable flavor. It has been shown to carry several crop diseases.

This species has been declared an environmental weed in New South Wales and Victoria. In New South Wales it grows from Glen Innes on the Northern Tablelands to Bombala in the far southeast of the state, and there are significant populations in the Kosciuszko National Park where it has invaded subalpine grassland, snowgum (Eucalyptus pauciflora) woodland and wetlands. In Victoria it is a prohibited species and must be eradicated or controlled.

== Uses ==
=== Food ===
The unopened flower buds can be marinated and used in a similar way to capers.

Maud Grieve's Modern Herbal (1931) states that "The taste of the dried herb is bitter and tingling, and the odour faintly resembles that of valerian."

=== Tea ===
Oxeye grows wild in the Arab Valley in Southern Palestine, where the flowers are picked and dried and used by Palestinians to make a local variety of herbal tea.

=== Use in horticulture ===
L. vulgare is widely cultivated and available as a perennial flowering ornamental plant for gardens and designed meadow landscapes. It thrives in a wide range of conditions but prefers a sunny or part-sun location of average soil that is damp (like many in the daisy family). The plant does well in raised and mulched garden beds that retain moisture and prevent weeds. It is a mesophyte and therefore requires more or less a continuous water supply. The heads of faded and old blooms are often deadheaded to promote further blooming and to maintain the appearance of the plant. There are cultivars, such as 'May Queen', that begin blooming in early spring.

== Allergies ==
Allergies to daisies do occur, usually causing contact dermatitis.

== Symbolism ==
Since 1987 the daisy, specifically either oxeye daisy or the marguerite daisy (Argyranthemum frutescens), replaced red clover (Trifolium pratense) as the national flower of Denmark. Over time oxeye daisy has become more popular as it is native to Denmark, in contrast to the marguerite daisy.

It is also a popular symbol of Latvia. In an open vote by the botanical society in 1994 it was selected as the national flower.

== See also ==
- Argyranthemum frutescens – marguerite daisy
- Bellis perennis – common daisy
- Buphthalmum salicifolium – yellow ox-eye daisy
