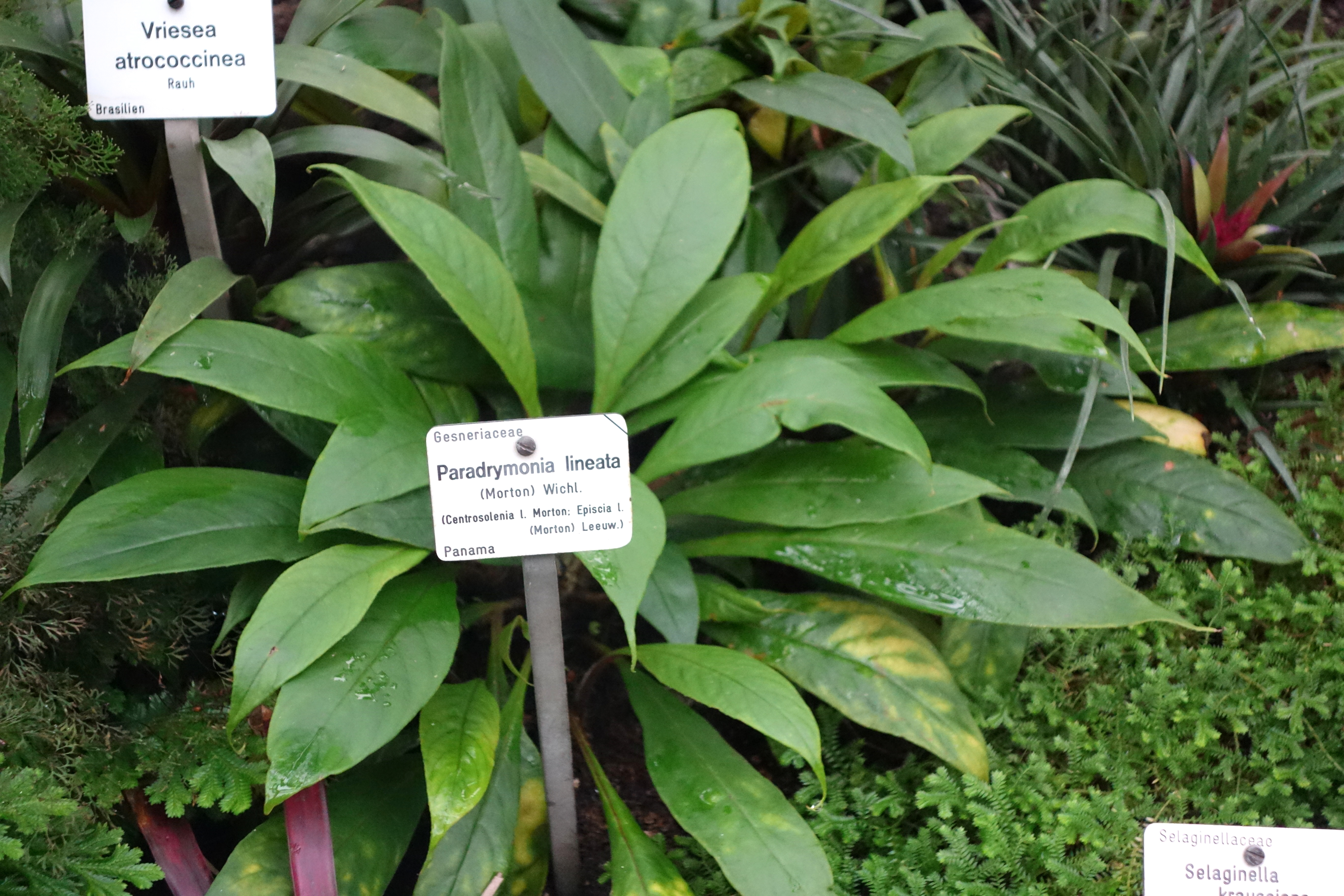
- Paradrymonia lineata

Scientific classification
- Kingdom: Plantae
- Clade: Tracheophytes
- Clade: Angiosperms
- Clade: Eudicots
- Clade: Asterids
- Order: Lamiales
- Family: Gesneriaceae
- Genus: Paradrymonia; Hanst. (1854)

Species
- 11; see text

= Paradrymonia =

Genus of flowering plants

Paradrymonia is a genus of flowering plants in family Gesneriaceae. It includes 11 species native to the tropical Americas, ranging from Honduras to Bolivia and northern Brazil.

- Paradrymonia badia Feuillet, L.E.Skog & Barabé
- Paradrymonia barbata Feuillet & L.E.Skog
- Paradrymonia buchtienii (Mansf.) Wiehler
- Paradrymonia campostyla (Leeuwenb.) Wiehler
- Paradrymonia ciliosa (Mart.) Wiehler
- Paradrymonia glabra (Benth.) Hanst.
- Paradrymonia longifolia (Poepp.) Wiehler
- Paradrymonia lutea Feuillet
- Paradrymonia tepui Feuillet
- Paradrymonia vivianensis R.Rojas & M.M.Mora
- Paradrymonia yatua Feuillet

Formerly placed here:

- Trichodrymonia aurea (Wiehler) M.M.Mora & J.L.Clark (as Paradrymonia aurea Wiehler and Paradrymonia fuquaiana Wiehler)
- Trichodrymonia binata (Wiehler) M.M.Mora & J.L.Clark (as Paradrymonia binata Wiehler)
- Trichodrymonia hypocyrta (Wiehler) M.M.Mora & J.L.Clark (as Paradrymonia hypocyrta Wiehler)
- Trichodrymonia lacera (Wiehler) M.M.Mora & J.L.Clark (as Paradrymonia lacera Wiehler)
- Trichodrymonia lineata (C.V.Morton) M.M.Mora & J.L.Clark (as Paradrymonia lineata (C.V.Morton) Wiehler)
