= Catasetum fuchsii =

Scientific classification
- Kingdom: Plantae
- Clade: Tracheophytes
- Clade: Angiosperms
- Clade: Monocots
- Order: Asparagales
- Family: Orchidaceae
- Subfamily: Epidendroideae
- Genus: Catasetum
- Species: C. fuchsii

Binomial name
- Catasetum fuchsii Dodson & R.Vásquez
- Distribution of Catasetum fuchsii in Brazil
- Distribution of Catasetum fuchsii in Bolivia

Species of orchid

Catasetum fuchsii the Fuch's catasetum is an epiphytic pseudobulbeous species of orchid native to central Brazil.

== Description ==
The plant is a medium sized hot to warm pseudobulbeous epiphyte with clustered, slightly compressed, and fusiform, 18 cm (7.1 in) long and 3.8 cm (1.5 in) wide pseudobulbs that are enveloped by leaf sheaths. Its flowers blooming season is summer to fall. The flowers are usually a dirty white color with either pink or purple starting from the middle of the flower and fading away in the edge of its petals. It also may have reddish spots.

== Care ==
Like other types of orchid, Catasetum fuchsii is a sun loving plant that needs around 45000 lux and 50% shade. It usually thrives in hot to warm conditions (around 18 °C (64 °F)). It also goes into a leaf-drop state during winter like other Catasetum species.

== Distribution ==
It is found in the department of Santa Cruz in Bolivia, and the Brazilian states of Goiás, Mato Grosso do Sul, Tocantins, and Pará specifically in dry forests and savannahs, growing usually on palms.

== Taxonomy and etymology ==
Catasetum fuchsii was first described in the Icones Plantarum Tropicarum which was published by the Marie Selby Botanical Gardens in 1982. It was featured in Fascicle 6, plate number 513, with the authority of Dodson & R.Velásquez. It is named after the botanist Fred Fuchs Jr. an orchid collector and vendor from Florida who discovered the plant before it was formally described.
