= Holstianthus =

Scientific classification
- Kingdom: Plantae
- Clade: Tracheophytes
- Clade: Angiosperms
- Clade: Eudicots
- Clade: Asterids
- Order: Gentianales
- Family: Rubiaceae
- Genus: Holstianthus; Steyerm.

Genus of plants

Holstianthus is a monotypic genus of flowering plants belonging to the family Rubiaceae. It only contains one species, Holstianthus barbigularis Steyerm.

It is native to Venezuela.

The genus name of Holstianthus is in honour of Bruce K. Holst (b. 1957), an American botanist who worked at the Missouri Botanical Garden and the Marie Selby Botanical Gardens in Florida. The Latin specific epithet of barbigularis refers to barba meaning bearded and gularis from 'gula' meaning "throat".

Both the genus and species were first described and published Ann. Missouri Bot. Gard. Vol.73 on page 495 in 1986.
