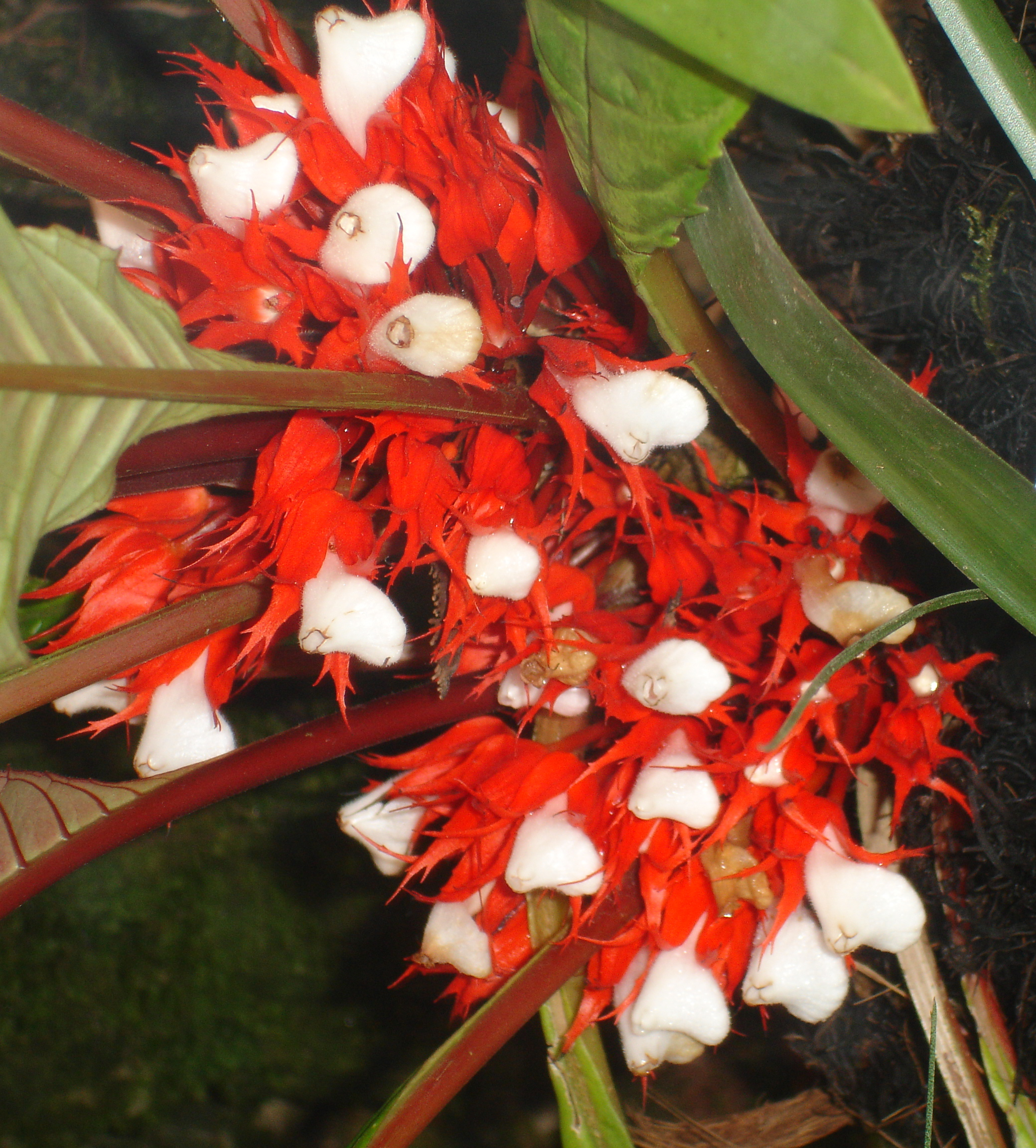

Conservation status
- Endangered (IUCN 3.1)

Scientific classification
- Kingdom: Plantae
- Clade: Tracheophytes
- Clade: Angiosperms
- Clade: Eudicots
- Clade: Asterids
- Order: Lamiales
- Family: Gesneriaceae
- Genus: Trichodrymonia
- Species: T. hypocyrta

Binomial name
- Trichodrymonia hypocyrta (Wiehler) M.M.Mora & J.L.Clark (2016)

Synonyms
- Paradrymonia hypocyrta Wiehler (1977)

= Trichodrymonia hypocyrta =

Species of flowering plant

Trichodrymonia hypocyrta is a species of plant in the family Gesneriaceae. It is endemic to Ecuador. Its natural habitats are subtropical or tropical moist lowland forests and subtropical or tropical moist montane forests.
