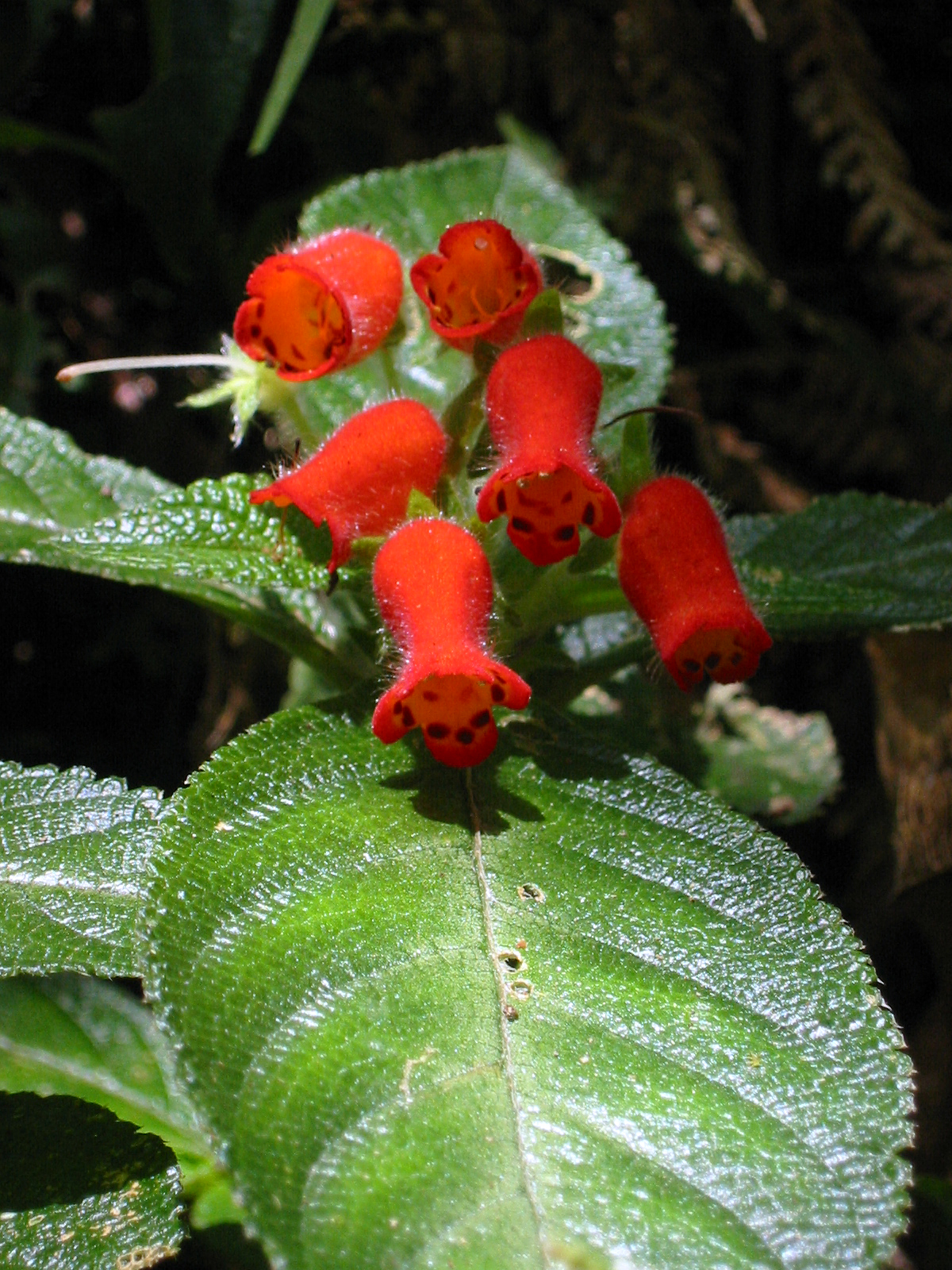
- Pearcea intermedia

Scientific classification
- Kingdom: Plantae
- Clade: Tracheophytes
- Clade: Angiosperms
- Clade: Eudicots
- Clade: Asterids
- Order: Lamiales
- Family: Gesneriaceae
- Genus: Pearcea; Regel (1867)

Species
- 19; see text

Synonyms
- Parakohleria Wiehler (1978)

= Pearcea =

Genus of flowering plants

Pearcea is a genus of tropical herbaceous plants in the family Gesneriaceae native to western South America. It is classified in tribe Gloxinieae and is closely related to the genus Kohleria, in which some of its species were previously included. The genus Parakohleria has recently been synonymized under Pearcea, a conclusion later supported by molecular analyses that showed that Pearcea hypocyrtiflora was nested within the former Parakohlerias.

The best-known and most widely cultivated species is Pearcea hypocyrtiflora, a low-growing herb with attractively marked leaves and unusual bubble-like red or orange flowers.

== Species ==
19 species are accepted.

- Pearcea abunda (Wiehler) L.P.Kvist & L.E.Skog
- Pearcea bella L.P.Kvist & L.E.Skog
- Pearcea bilabiata L.P.Kvist & L.E.Skog
- Pearcea cordata L.P.Kvist & L.E.Skog
- Pearcea fuscicalyx L.P.Kvist & L.E.Skog
- Pearcea glabrata L.P.Kvist & L.E.Skog
- Pearcea gracilis L.P.Kvist & L.E.Skog
- Pearcea grandifolia L.P.Kvist & L.E.Skog
- Pearcea hispidissima (Wiehler) L.P.Kvist & L.E.Skog
- Pearcea hypocyrtiflora (Hook.f.) Regel
- Pearcea intermedia L.P.Kvist & L.E.Skog
- Pearcea lutea J.L.Clark & H.Garzón
- Pearcea pileifolia J.L.Clark & L.E.Skog
- Pearcea purpurea (Poepp.) L.P.Kvist & L.E.Skog
- Pearcea reticulata (Fritsch) L.P.Kvist & L.E.Skog
- Pearcea rhodotricha (Cuatrec.) L.P.Kvist & L.E.Skog
- Pearcea schimpfii Mansf.
- Pearcea sprucei (Britton) L.P.Kvist & L.E.Skog
- Pearcea strigosa L.P.Kvist & L.E.Skog
