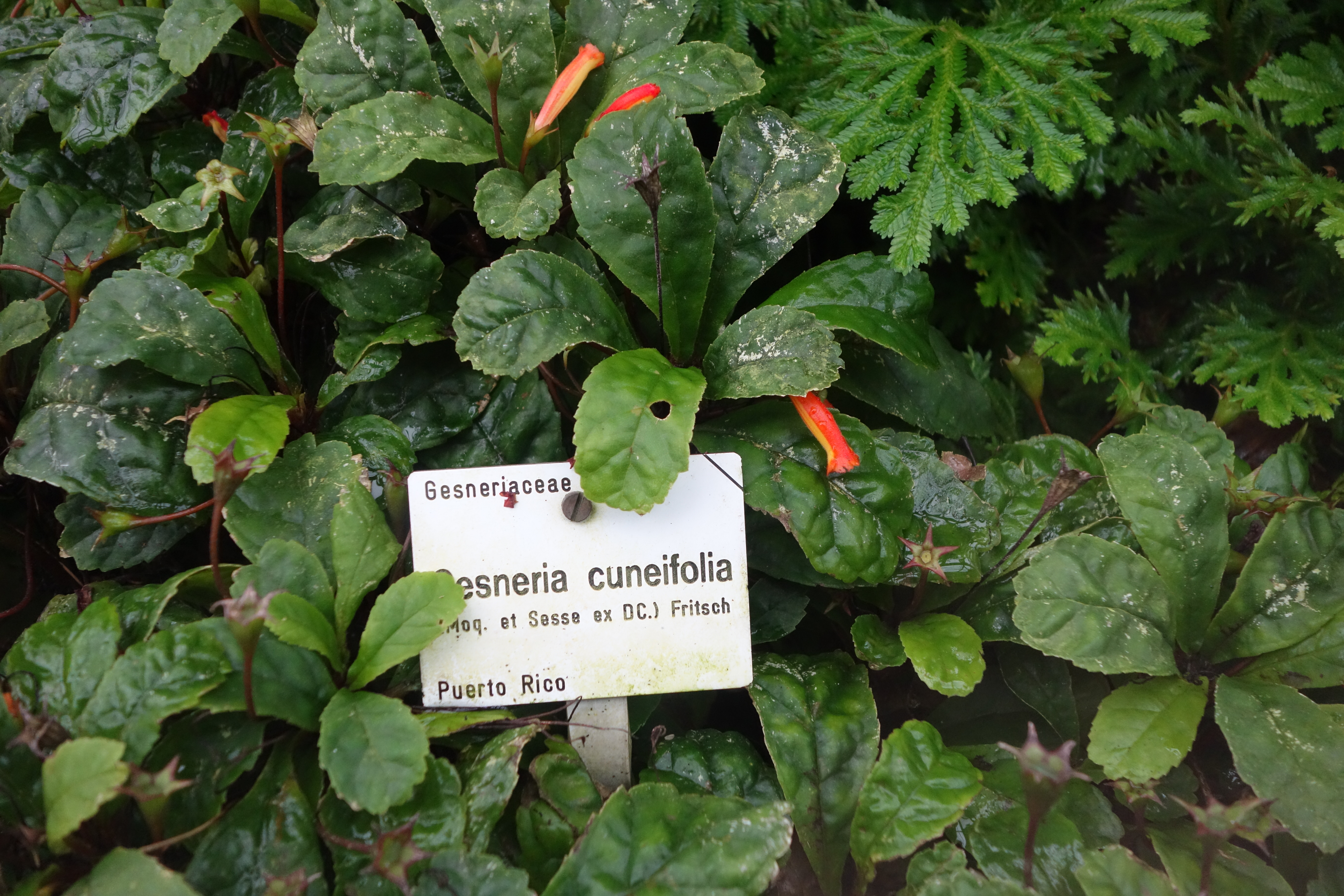

Scientific classification
- Kingdom: Plantae
- Clade: Tracheophytes
- Clade: Angiosperms
- Clade: Eudicots
- Clade: Asterids
- Order: Lamiales
- Family: Gesneriaceae
- Genus: Gesneria
- Species: G. cuneifolia

Binomial name
- Gesneria cuneifolia (DC.) Fritsch

Synonyms
- Conradia cuneifolia DC.; Gesneria cuneifolia Sessé & Moc. nom. illeg.; Pentaraphia cuneifolia (DC.) Hanst.

= Gesneria cuneifolia =

Species of plant

Gesneria cuneifolia (yerba parrera) is a plant species in the family Gesneriaceae.
