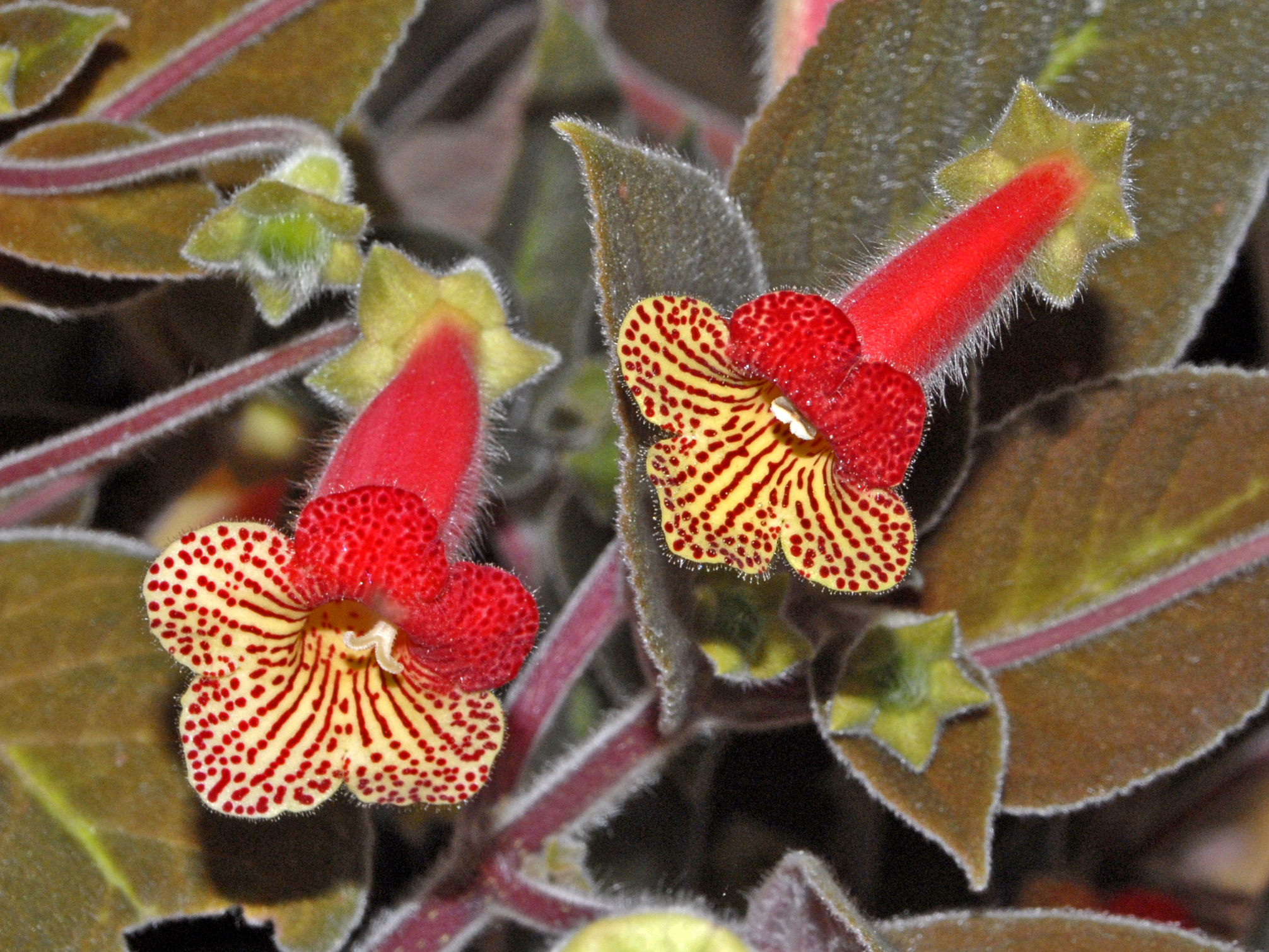
- Kohleria amabilis var. bogotensis

Scientific classification
- Kingdom: Plantae
- Clade: Embryophytes
- Clade: Tracheophytes
- Clade: Spermatophytes
- Clade: Angiosperms
- Clade: Eudicots
- Clade: Asterids
- Order: Lamiales
- Family: Gesneriaceae
- Subfamily: Gesnerioideae
- Genus: Kohleria; Regel

Species
- See text.

Synonyms
- Brachyloma Hanst.; Calycostemma Hanst.; Campanea Decne.; Capanea Decne. ex Planch.; Cryptoloma Hanst.; Giesleria Regel; Isoloma Decne.; Sciadocalyx Regel; Synepilaena Baill.; Tydaea Decne.

= Kohleria =

Genus of flowering plants

Kohleria is a New World genus of the flowering plant family Gesneriaceae. The plants are generally tropical herbs or subshrubs with velvety stems and foliage and brightly colored flowers with spots or markings in contrasting colors. They are rhizomatous and commonly include a period of dormancy in their growth cycle. The genus was revised in 1992 and was then recognized as having 19 species distributed in Central America and South America. phylogenetic in 2005 indicated that the epiphytic genus Capanea is derived from within Kohleria, and the two species of Capanea were subsequently transferred to Kohleria. The genus Pearcea is closely related.

Because of their colorful and exotically patterned flowers, as well as a general interest in the many tropical flowering plants that were being introduced from the Americas, kohlerias were very popular in England and Europe in the 19th century. Many species and hybrids were lavishly illustrated in horticultural magazines such as Curtis's Botanical Magazine under the discarded or erroneous names of Achimenes, Gesneria, Isoloma, Sciadocalyx, and Tydaea. These species and hybrids almost entirely disappeared in the early 20th century, and plant breeders have only recently begun to work extensively with this genus again.

Several species are widespread, variable, weedy, and tend to hybridize in the wild, and numerous names have been described that are synonyms of other species or are hybrid taxa.

== Species ==
As of August 2024, Plants of the World Online accepted the following species:

- Kohleria affinis (Fritsch) Roalson & Boggan (syn. Capanea affinis)
- Kohleria allenii Standl. & L.O.Williams
- Kohleria amabilis (Planch. & Linden) Fritsch
- Kohleria andina (Fritsch) J.L.Clark & L.Jost
- Kohleria anisophylla (Fritsch) Wiehler
- Kohleria bella C.V.Morton
- Kohleria diastemoides L.P.Kvist & L.E.Skog
- Kohleria × gigantea (Planch.) Fritsch
- Kohleria grandiflora L.P.Kvist & L.E.Skog
- Kohleria hirsuta (Kunth) Regel
- Kohleria hondensis (Kunth) Regel
- Kohleria huilensis Arango-Gómez, Clavijo & Zuluaga
- Kohleria hypertrichosa J.L.Clark & L.E.Skog
- Kohleria inaequalis (Benth.) Wiehler
- Kohleria longicalyx L.P.Kvist & L.E.Skog
- Kohleria neglecta L.P.Kvist & L.E.Skog
- Kohleria peruviana Fritsch
- Kohleria rugata (Scheidw.) L.P.Kvist & L.E.Skog
- Kohleria spicata (Kunth) Oerst.
- Kohleria stuebeliana Fritsch
- Kohleria tigridia (Ohlend.) Roalson & Boggan (syn. Capanea grandiflora)
- Kohleria trianae (Regel) Hanst.
- Kohleria tubiflora (Cav.) Hanst.
- Kohleria villosa (Fritsch) Wiehler
- Kohleria warszewiczii (Regel) Hanst. – AGM

== Cultivation ==
Their showy flowers and ease of culture have made them popular with growers of indoor houseplants. Numerous species and hybrids are now in cultivation, some with patterned or variegated foliage as well as vivid flowers. They are easily propagated by both stem cuttings and division of the rhizomes.

== References and external links ==
- Kvist, L.P. & L.E. Skog. 1992. Revision of Kohleria (Gesneriaceae). Smithsonian Contributions to Botany 79: 1-83, pdf.
- Roalson, E.H.; J.K. Boggan, L.E., Skog & E.A. Zimmer (2005), "Untangling Gloxinieae (Gesneriaceae). I. Phylogenetic patterns and generic boundaries inferred from nuclear, chloroplast, and morphological cladistic data sets", Taxon, 54 (2): 389–410, doi:10.2307/25065368, JSTOR 25065368
- Roalson E.H.; Boggan J.K.; Skog L.E. (2005). "Reorganization of tribal and generic boundaries in the Gloxinieae (Gesneriaceae: Gesnerioideae) and the description of a new tribe in the Gesnerioideae, Sphaerorrhizeae". Selbyana. 25 (2): 225–238.
- Kohleria from The Genera of Gesneriaceae
- Kohleria and Koellikeria from the Gesneriad Reference Web
- Kohleria from the eGradini.ro - Romanian Gardening Website
