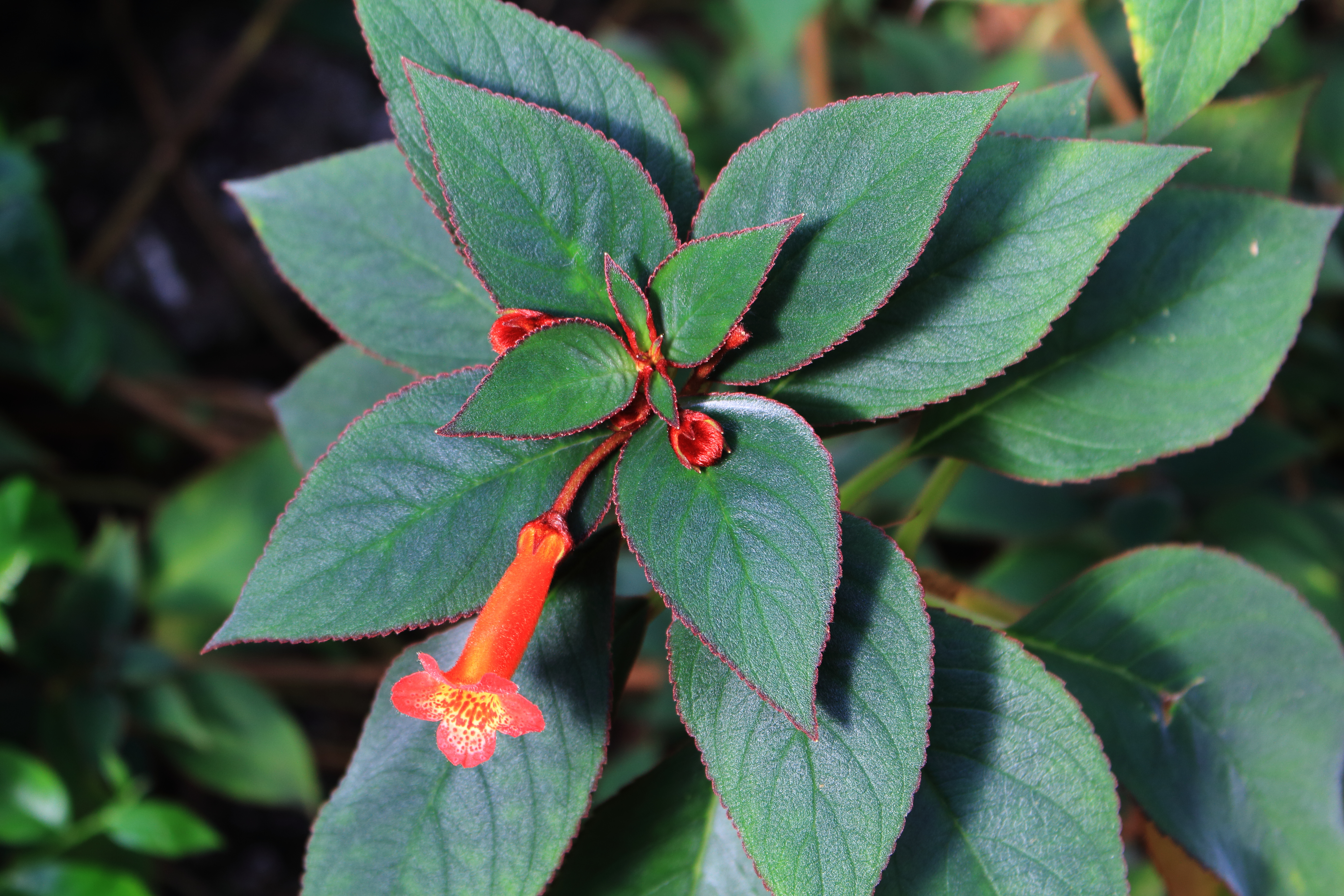
- At the Berlin Botanical Garden and Botanical Museum
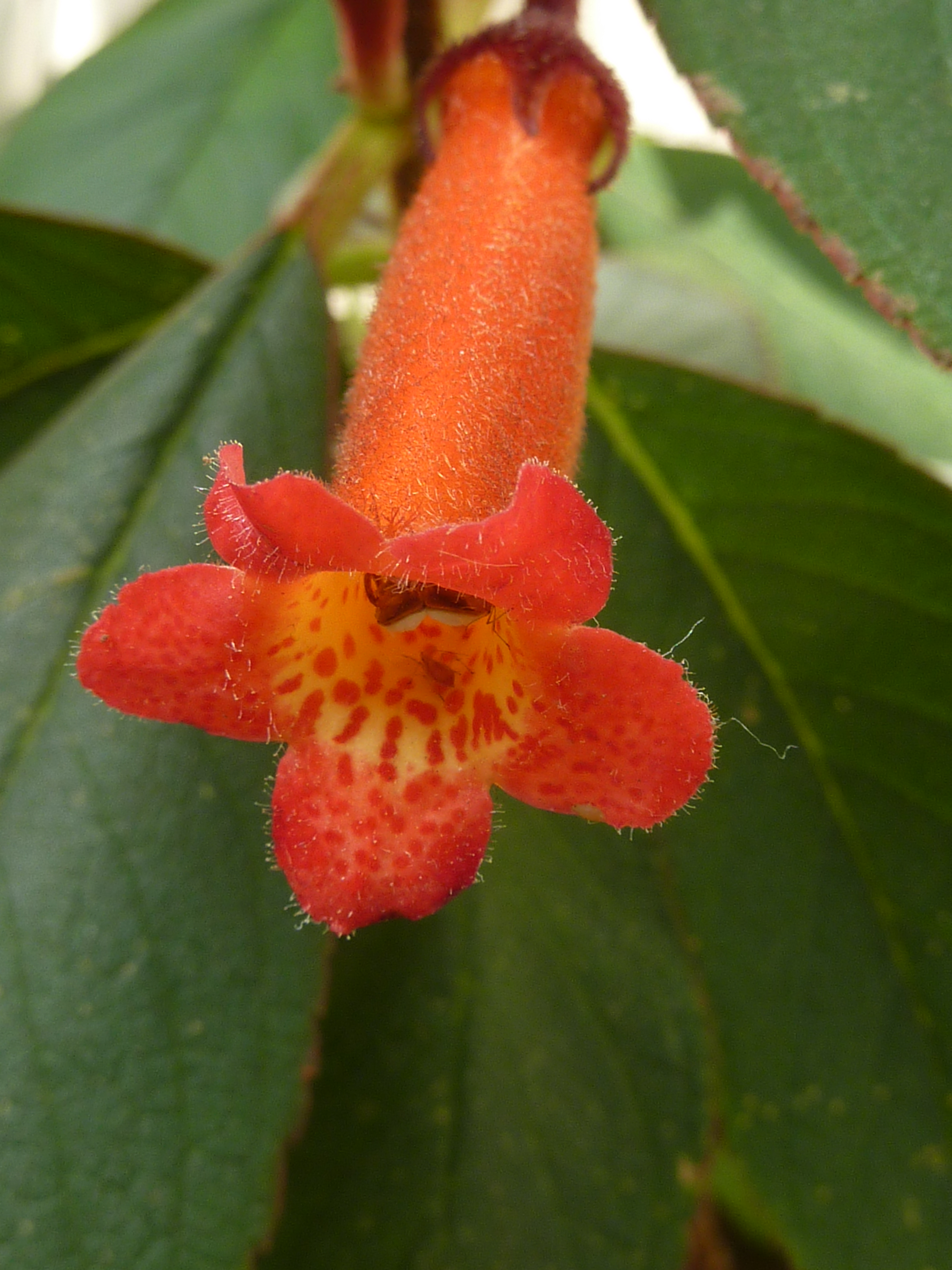
- Close-up of flower

Scientific classification
- Kingdom: Plantae
- Clade: Tracheophytes
- Clade: Angiosperms
- Clade: Eudicots
- Clade: Asterids
- Order: Lamiales
- Family: Gesneriaceae
- Genus: Kohleria
- Species: K. hirsuta

Binomial name
- Kohleria hirsuta (Kunth) Regel

Synonyms
- List: Brachyloma erianthum (Benth.) Hanst.; Brachyloma hirsutum (Kunth) Hanst.; Brachyloma karstenianum Hanst.; Brachyloma leucomallon Hanst.; Brachyloma longiflorum (Kunth) Hanst.; Brachyloma molle (Decne.) Hanst.; Brachyloma moritzianum C.D.Bouché & Hanst.; Brachyloma rhodomallon Hanst.; Brachyloma rubricaule (Kunth & C.D.Bouché) Hanst.; Brachyloma ventricosum Hanst.; Brachyloma vestitum Hanst.; Columnea eriantha (Benth.) Hanst.; Gesneria eriantha Benth.; Gesneria hirsuta Kunth; Gesneria longiflora Kunth; Gesneria mollis Kunth; Gesneria oblongata Hook.; Gesneria rubricaulis Kunth & C.D.Bouché; Gesneria ventricosa Hanst.; Gesneria vestita Benth.; Isoloma erianthum (Benth.) Decne.; Isoloma hirsutum (Kunth) Regel; Isoloma molle Decne.; Isoloma pycnosuzygium Donn.Sm.; Isoloma rubricaule (Kunth & C.D.Bouché) Regel; Isoloma vestitum Decne.; Kohleria brachycalyx Fritsch; Kohleria eriantha (Benth.) Hanst.; Kohleria lanigera Fritsch; Kohleria leucomallos Hanst.; Kohleria longiflora Hanst.; Kohleria longipedunculata Hanst.; Kohleria mollis (Decne.) Hanst.; Kohleria moritziana (C.D.Bouché & Hanst.) Hanst.; Kohleria pycnosuzygium (Donn.Sm.) V.M.Badillo; Kohleria rhodomallos (Hanst.) Hanst.; Kohleria rubricaulis (Kunth & C.D.Bouché) Hassk.; Kohleria straussiana Fritsch; Kohleria ventricosa Hanst.; Kohleria vestita Hanst.

= Kohleria hirsuta =

Species of plant

Kohleria hirsuta, the woolly kohleria, is a species of flowering plant in the family Gesneriaceae, native to northern South America, and introduced to the Dominican Republic. In 1993, as its synonym Kohleria eriantha, it gained the Royal Horticultural Society's Award of Garden Merit as a hothouse plant, but this award appears to have been rescinded.

== Subtaxa ==
The following varieties are accepted:

- Kohleria hirsuta var. hirsuta – entire range
- Kohleria hirsuta var. longipes (Benth.) L.P.Kvist & L.E.Skog – Colombia
