= Gesneria calycina =

Conservation status
- Near Threatened (IUCN 2.3)

Scientific classification
- Kingdom: Plantae
- Clade: Tracheophytes
- Clade: Angiosperms
- Clade: Eudicots
- Clade: Asterids
- Order: Lamiales
- Family: Gesneriaceae
- Genus: Gesneria
- Species: G. calycina

Binomial name
- Gesneria calycina Sw.

Species of flowering plant

Gesneria calycina is a species of plant in the family Gesneriaceae. It is endemic to Jamaica.
