= Gesneria calycosa =

Conservation status
- Near Threatened (IUCN 2.3)

Scientific classification
- Kingdom: Plantae
- Clade: Tracheophytes
- Clade: Angiosperms
- Clade: Eudicots
- Clade: Asterids
- Order: Lamiales
- Family: Gesneriaceae
- Genus: Gesneria
- Species: G. calycosa

Binomial name
- Gesneria calycosa (Hook.) Kuntze

Species of plant

Gesneria calycosa is a species of plant in the family Gesneriaceae, first formally listed in 1891. The shrub or tree is endemic to Jamaica.
