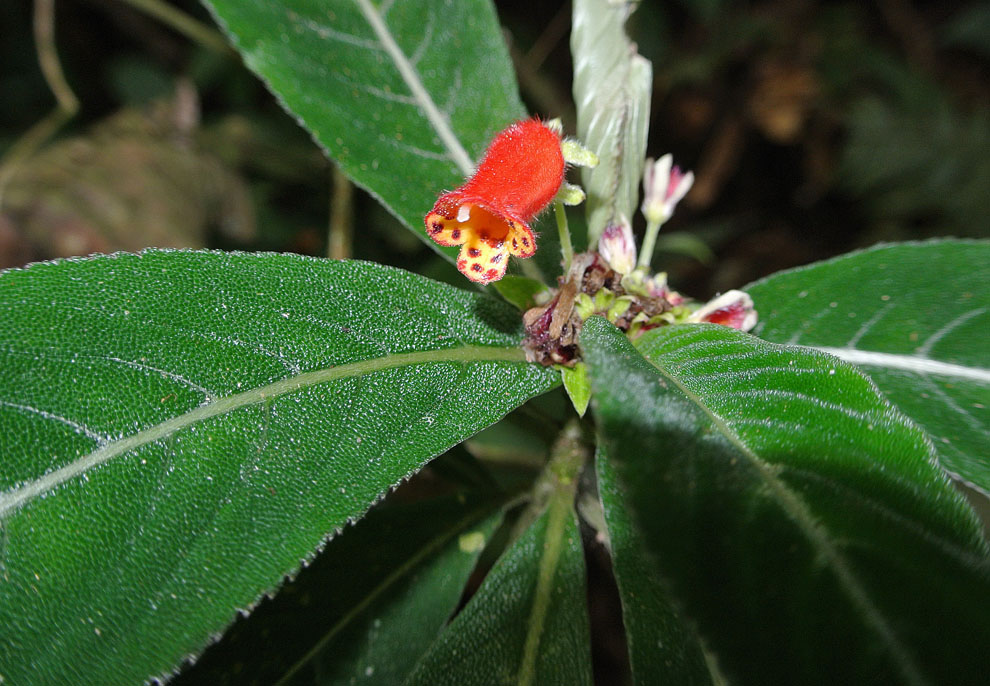

Scientific classification
- Kingdom: Plantae
- Clade: Tracheophytes
- Clade: Angiosperms
- Clade: Eudicots
- Clade: Asterids
- Order: Lamiales
- Family: Gesneriaceae
- Genus: Pearcea
- Species: P. sprucei

Binomial name
- Pearcea sprucei (Britton ex Rusby) L.P. Kvist & L.E. Skog 1996

= Pearcea sprucei =

Species of flowering plant

Pearcea sprucei is a species of Gesneriaceae that is native to Bolivia, Ecuador, and Peru.
