= Pearcea schimpfii =

Conservation status
- Near Threatened (IUCN 3.1)

Scientific classification
- Kingdom: Plantae
- Clade: Tracheophytes
- Clade: Angiosperms
- Clade: Eudicots
- Clade: Asterids
- Order: Lamiales
- Family: Gesneriaceae
- Genus: Pearcea
- Species: P. schimpfii

Binomial name
- Pearcea schimpfii Mansf.

Species of flowering plant

Pearcea schimpfii is a species of plant in the family Gesneriaceae. It is endemic to Ecuador. Its natural habitat is subtropical or tropical moist montane forests.
