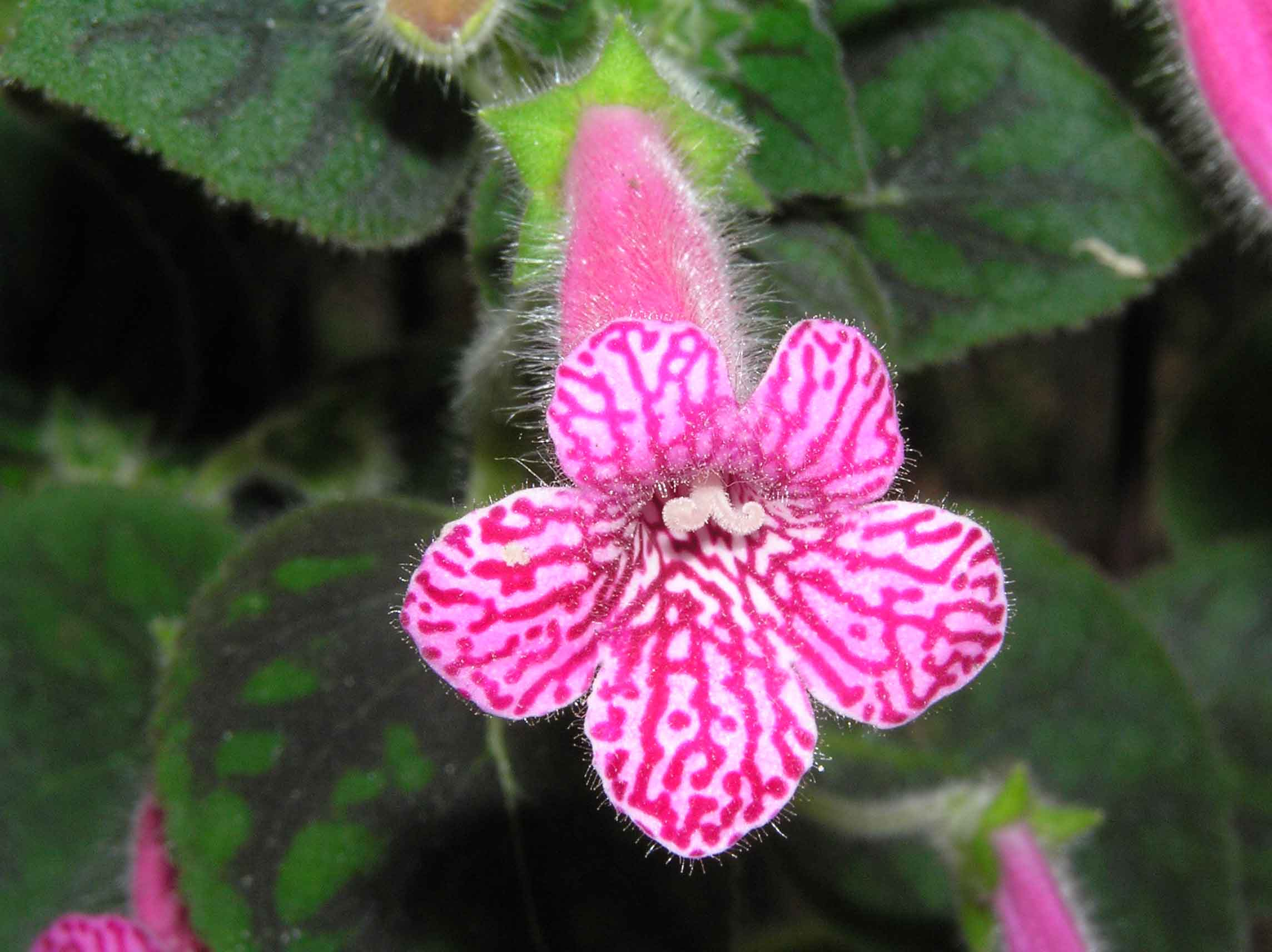
- Flower of Kohleria amabilis

Scientific classification
- Kingdom: Plantae
- Clade: Tracheophytes
- Clade: Angiosperms
- Clade: Eudicots
- Clade: Asterids
- Order: Lamiales
- Family: Gesneriaceae
- Genus: Kohleria
- Species: K. amabilis

Binomial name
- Kohleria amabilis (Planch. & Linden) Fritsch

Synonyms
- Achimenes amabilis (Planch. & Linden) Van Houtte; Isoloma amabilis (Planch. & Linden) Focke; Isoloma bogotense var. amabile (Planch. & Linden) Voss; Tydaea amabilis Planch. & Linden

= Kohleria amabilis =

Species of tree

Kohleria amabilis, the tree gloxinia, is a species of the flowering plant belonging to the family Gesneriaceae.

== Varieties ==
- Kohleria amabilis var. amabilis
- Kohleria amabilis var. bogotensis (syn. K. bogotensis) (G. Nicholson) L.P. Kvist & L.E. Skog

== Description ==
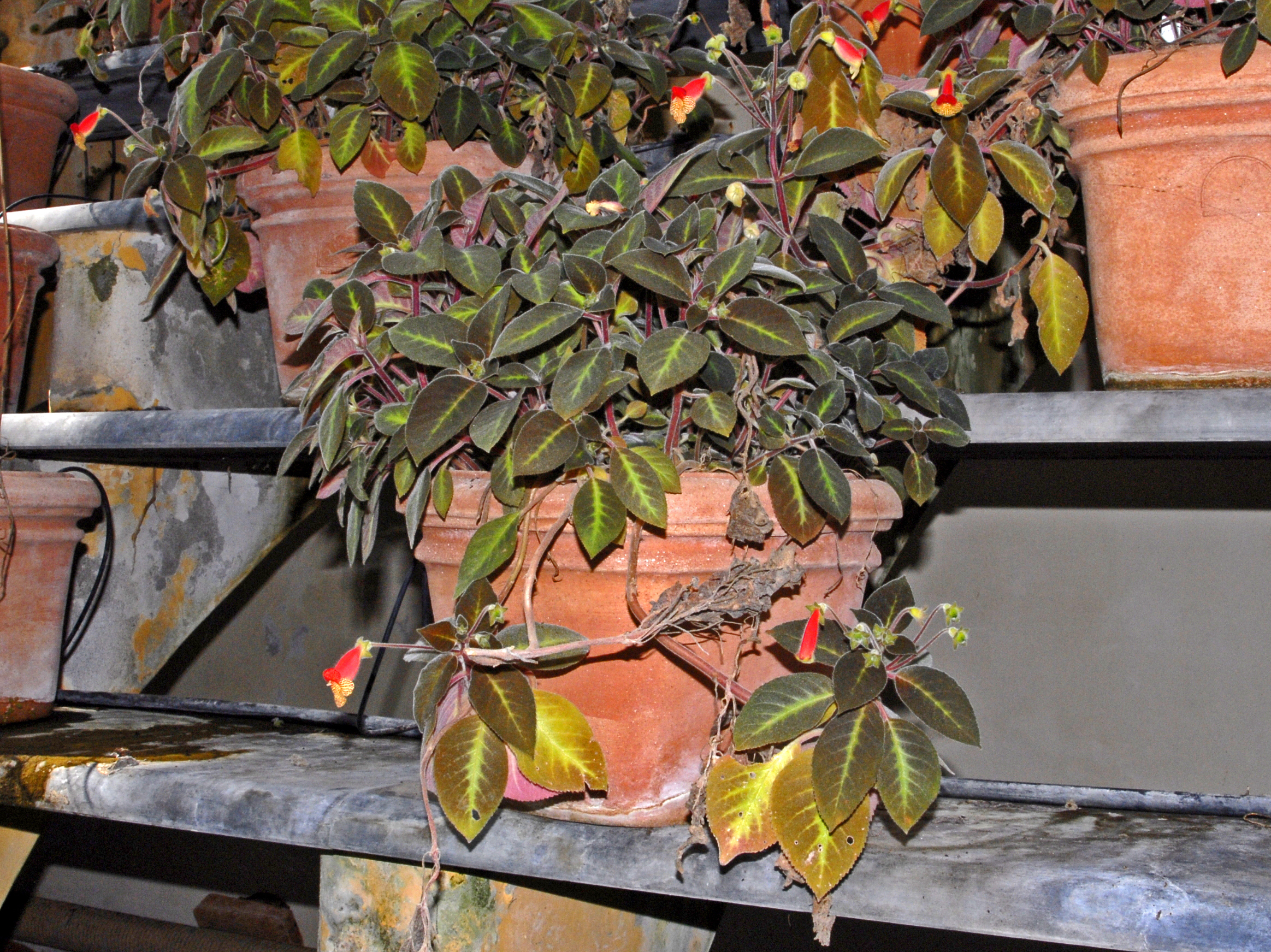
Plant of Kohleria amabilis var. bogotensis

Kohleria amabilis can reach a height of 60 centimetres (24 in). Leaves have a silvery pattern and are egg-shaped, velvety, 10–10.5 centimetres (3.9–4.1 in) long. The brightly colored flowers are about 5 centimetres (2.0 in) long, tubular, slightly nodding, usually pink on the outside with red or purple dots inside. Kohleria amabilis var. bogotensis has dark green leaves and yellow and red-orange flowers. Flowering period extends from late winter through the spring and summer. These tropical plants are rhizomatous and have a period of seasonal leafless dormancy.

== Distribution ==
This species is native to Honduras (Mesoamerica) and Colombia.
