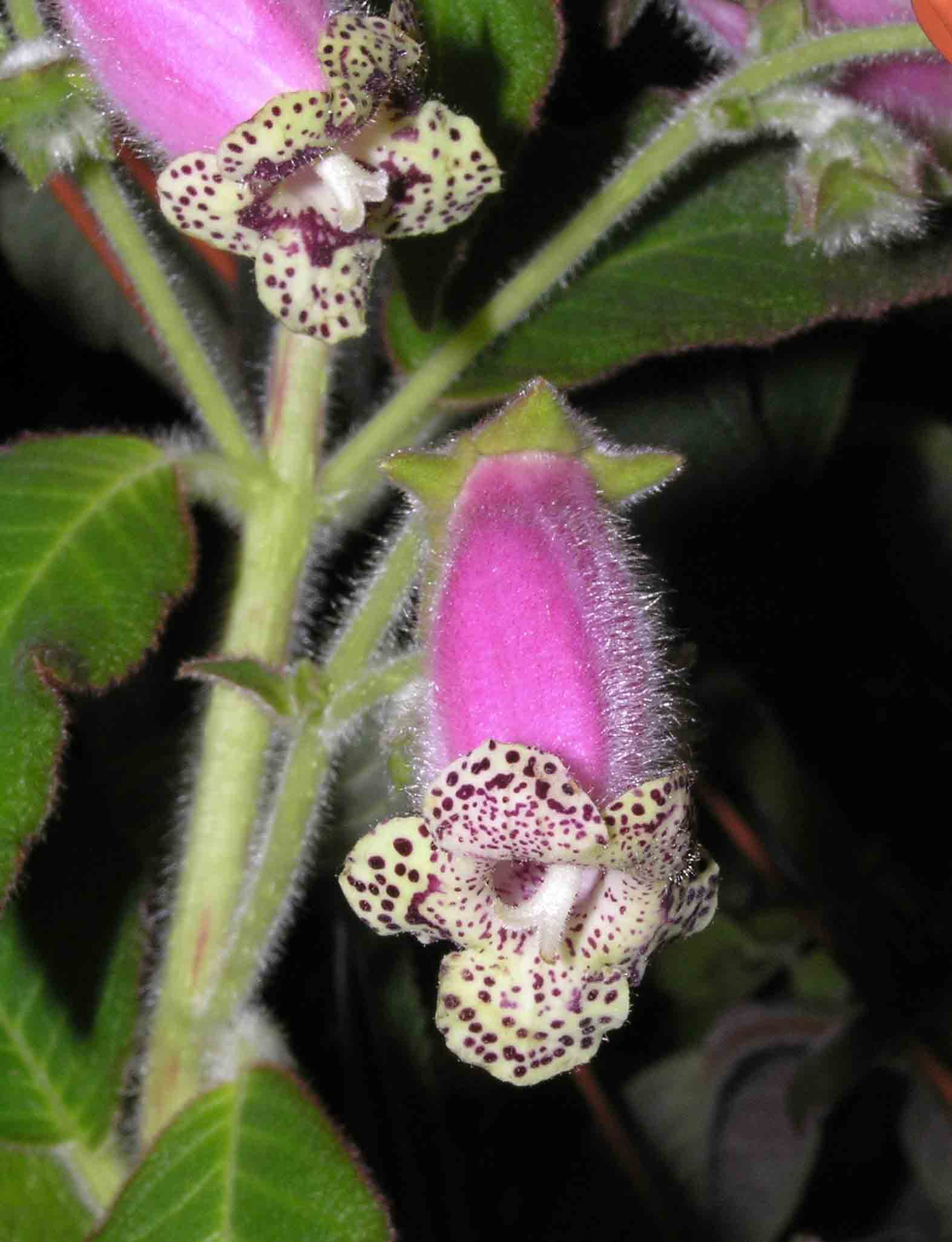
- Close-up of flowers
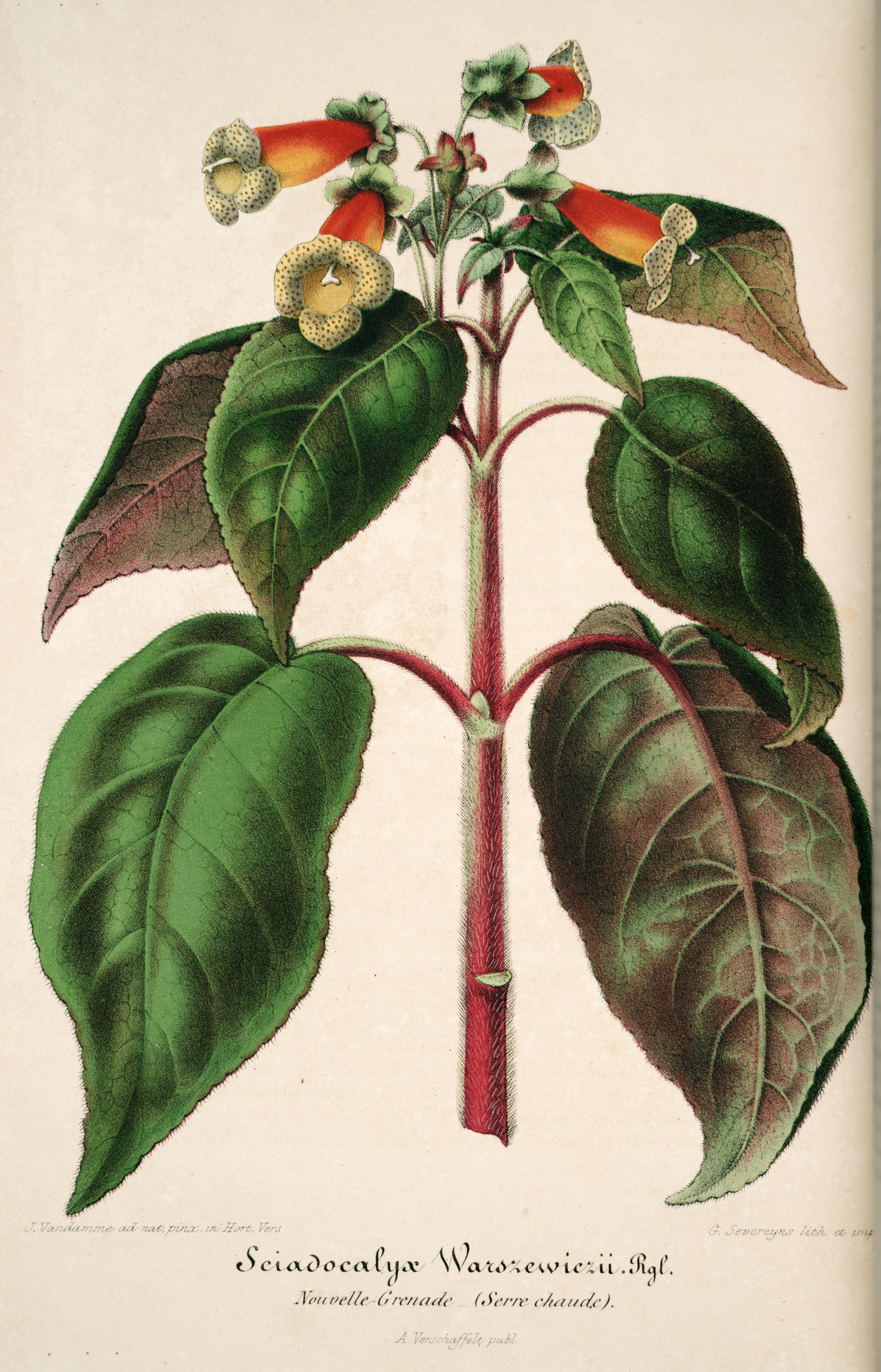
- Botanical illustration

Scientific classification
- Kingdom: Plantae
- Clade: Embryophytes
- Clade: Tracheophytes
- Clade: Angiosperms
- Clade: Eudicots
- Clade: Asterids
- Order: Lamiales
- Family: Gesneriaceae
- Genus: Kohleria
- Species: K. warszewiczii

Binomial name
- Kohleria warszewiczii (Regel) Hanst.

Synonyms
- List: Gesneria regeliana Warsz. ex Planch.; Isoloma digitaliflorum (Linden & André) N.E.Br.; Isoloma regelianum (Warsz. ex Planch.) Voss; Isoloma sciadocalyx Focke; Isoloma warszewiczii (Regel) C.H.Wright & Dewar; Kohleria digitaliflora (Linden & André) Fritsch; Kohleria violacea Fritsch; Sciadocalyx digitaliflora Linden & André; Sciadocalyx warszewiczii Regel

= Kohleria warszewiczii =

Species of flowering plant

Kohleria warszewiczii is a species of flowering plant in the family Gesneriaceae, native to Colombia. It has gained the Royal Horticultural Society's Award of Garden Merit.
