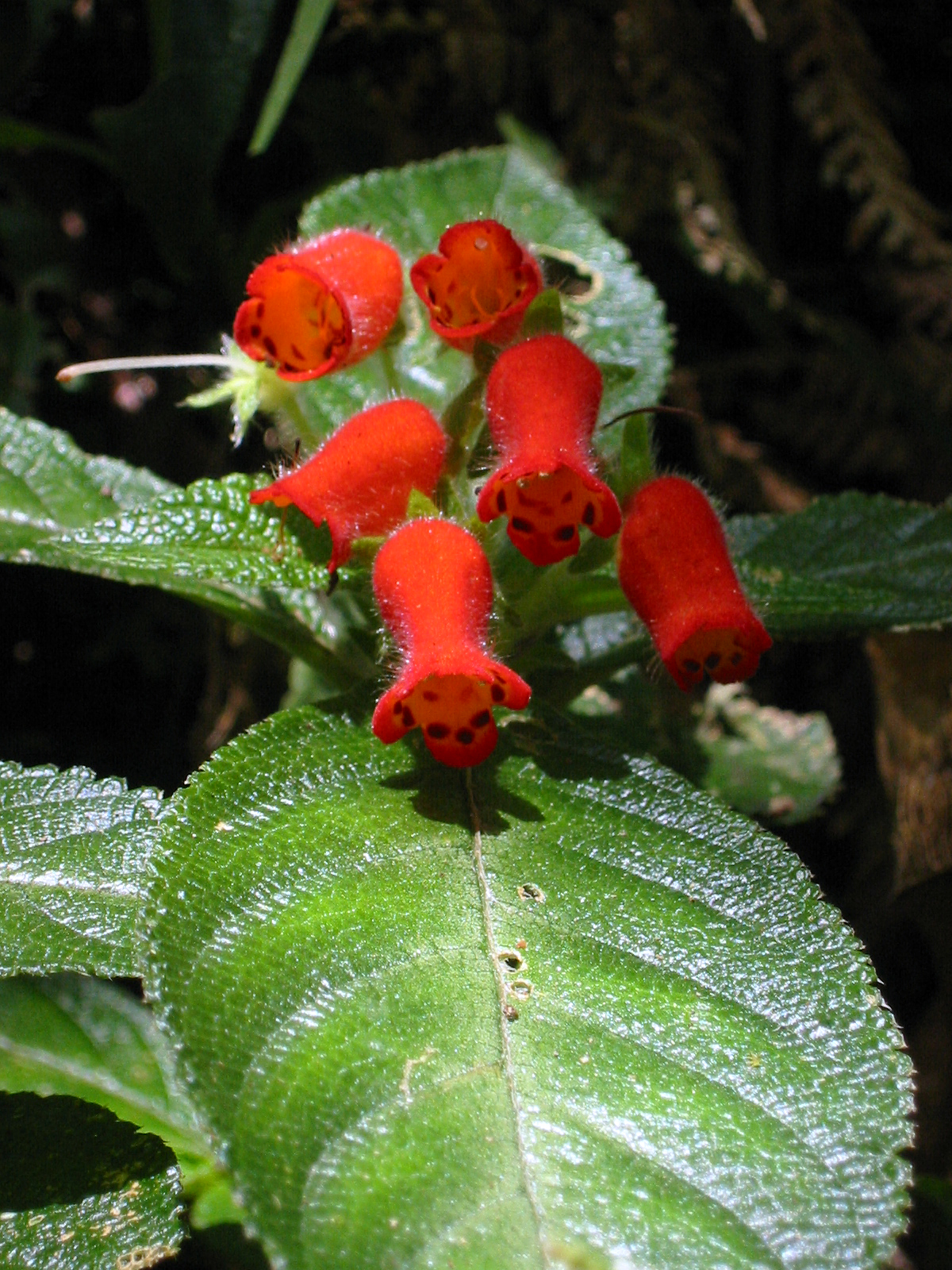
- Photographed in situ in the Podocarpus National Park, southern Ecuador

Conservation status
- Endangered (IUCN 3.1)

Scientific classification
- Kingdom: Plantae
- Clade: Tracheophytes
- Clade: Angiosperms
- Clade: Eudicots
- Clade: Asterids
- Order: Lamiales
- Family: Gesneriaceae
- Genus: Pearcea
- Species: P. intermedia

Binomial name
- Pearcea intermedia L.P.Kvist & L.E.Skog

= Pearcea intermedia =

Species of flowering plant

Pearcea intermedia is a threatened species from Ecuador.
