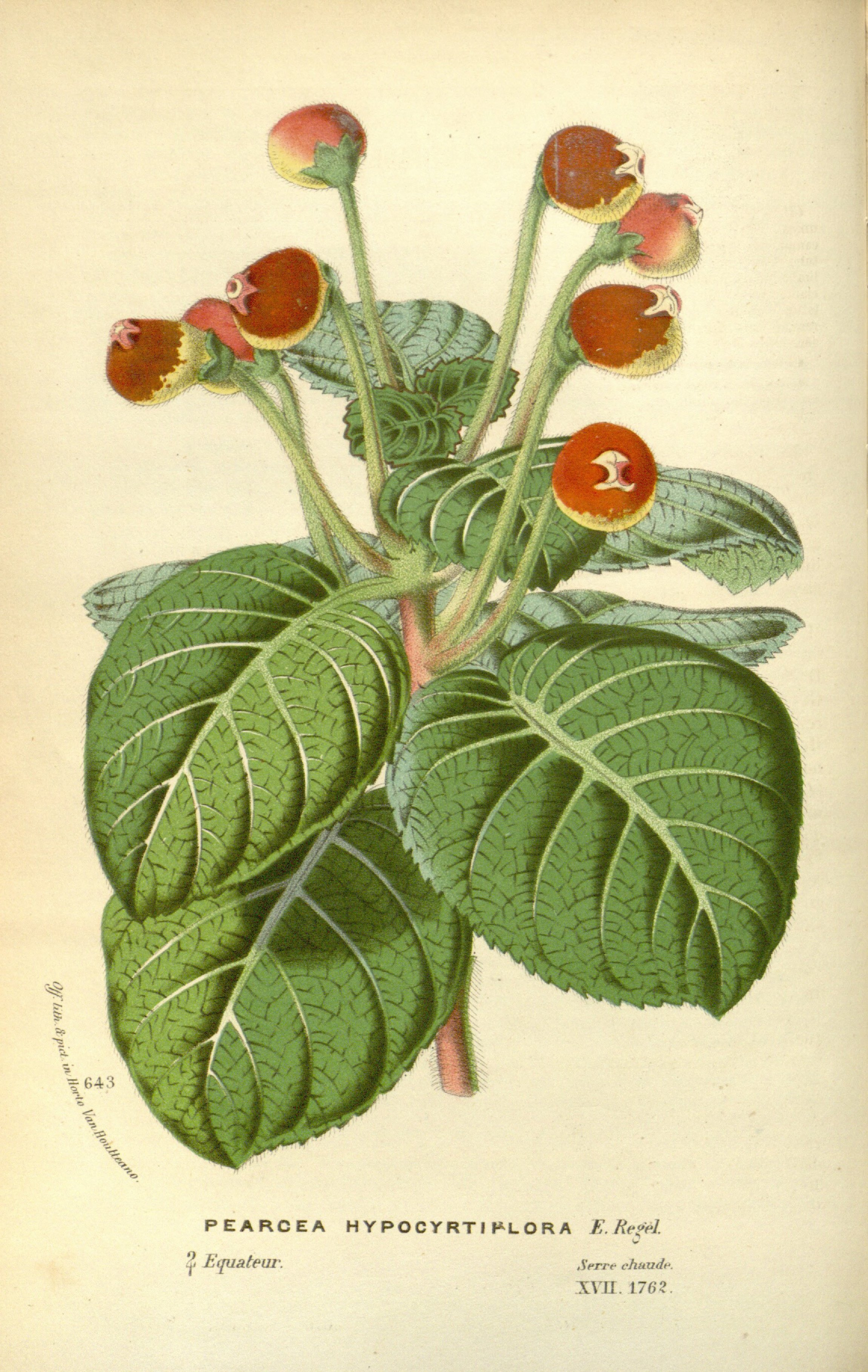

Conservation status
- Near Threatened (IUCN 3.1)

Scientific classification
- Kingdom: Plantae
- Clade: Tracheophytes
- Clade: Angiosperms
- Clade: Eudicots
- Clade: Asterids
- Order: Lamiales
- Family: Gesneriaceae
- Genus: Pearcea
- Species: P. hypocyrtiflora

Binomial name
- Pearcea hypocyrtiflora (Hook.f.) Regel

= Pearcea hypocyrtiflora =

Species of flowering plant

Pearcea hypocyrtiflora is an edible species of plant in the family Gesneriaceae. It is endemic to Ecuador. Its natural habitats are subtropical or tropical moist lowland forests and subtropical or tropical moist montane forests.
