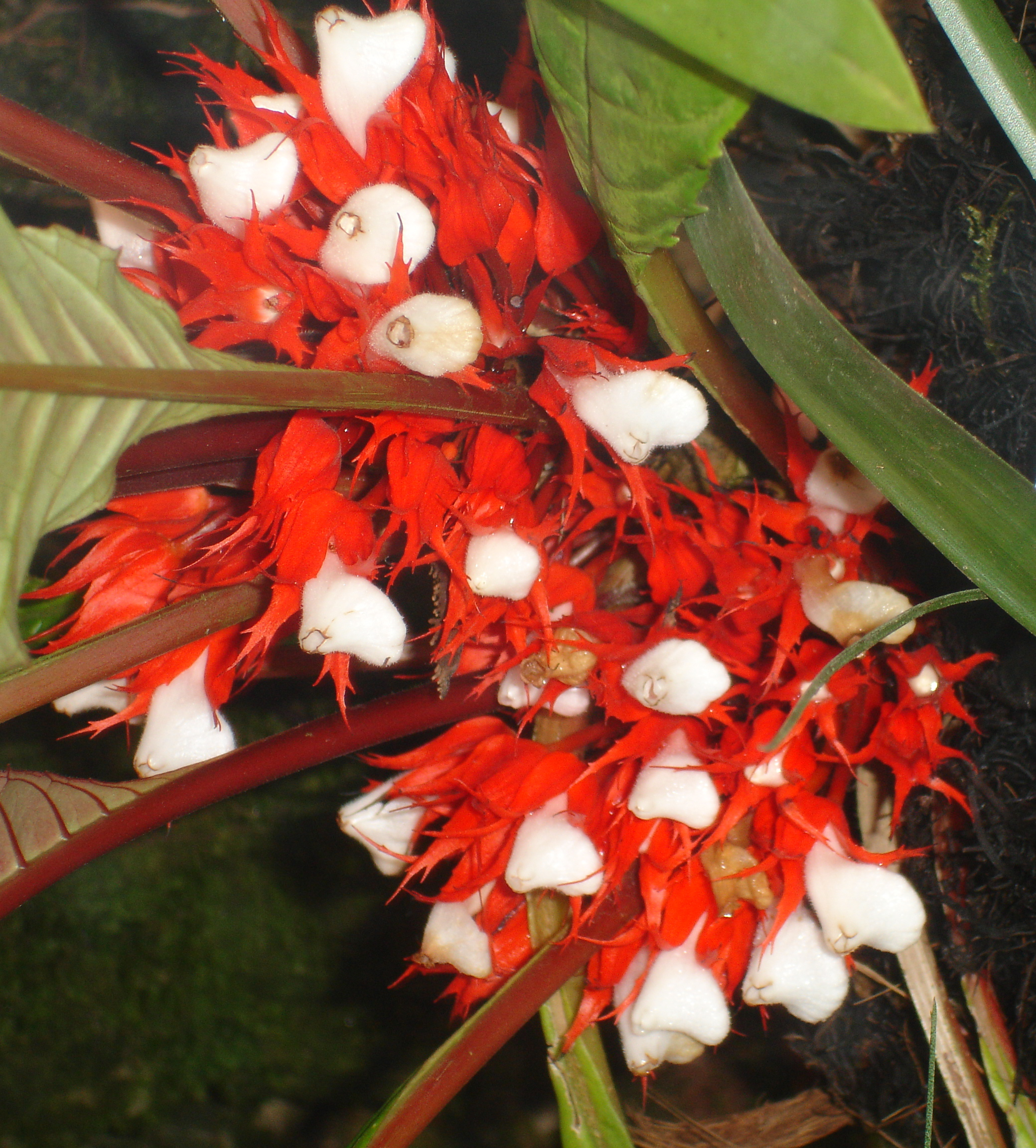
- Paradrymonia hypocyrta (synonym of Trichodrymonia hypocyrta)

Scientific classification
- Kingdom: Plantae
- Clade: Tracheophytes
- Clade: Angiosperms
- Clade: Eudicots
- Clade: Asterids
- Order: Lamiales
- Family: Gesneriaceae
- Genus: Trichodrymonia; Oerst. (1858)

Species
- 29; see text

= Trichodrymonia =

Genus of flowering plants

Trichodrymonia is a genus of flowering plants belonging to the family Gesneriaceae.

Its native range is southwestern Mexico to Venezuela and Peru.

Species:

- Trichodrymonia alata (Kriebel) M.M.Mora & J.L.Clark
- Trichodrymonia alba (Wiehler) M.M.Mora & J.L.Clark
- Trichodrymonia apicaudata (M.M.Mora & J.L.Clark) M.M.Mora & J.L.Clark
- Trichodrymonia aurea (Wiehler) M.M.Mora & J.L.Clark
- Trichodrymonia binata (Wiehler) M.M.Mora & J.L.Clark
- Trichodrymonia conferta (C.V.Morton) M.M.Mora & J.L.Clark
- Trichodrymonia congesta Oerst.
- Trichodrymonia darienensis (Seem.) M.M.Mora & J.L.Clark
- Trichodrymonia erythropus (Hook.f.) M.M.Mora & J.L.Clark
- Trichodrymonia flava (Wiehler) M.M.Mora & J.L.Clark
- Trichodrymonia gibbosa (Wiehler) M.M.Mora & J.L.Clark
- Trichodrymonia gigantea (Wiehler) M.M.Mora & J.L.Clark
- Trichodrymonia hirta (L.E.Skog) M.M.Mora & J.L.Clark
- Trichodrymonia hypocyrta (Wiehler) M.M.Mora & J.L.Clark
- Trichodrymonia lacera (Wiehler) M.M.Mora & J.L.Clark
- Trichodrymonia lineata (C.V.Morton) M.M.Mora & J.L.Clark
- Trichodrymonia longipetiolata (Donn.Sm.) M.M.Mora & J.L.Clark
- Trichodrymonia macrophylla (Wiehler) M.M.Mora & J.L.Clark
- Trichodrymonia maguirei (Feuillet) M.M.Mora & J.L.Clark
- Trichodrymonia metamorphophylla (Donn.Sm.) M.M.Mora & J.L.Clark
- Trichodrymonia ommata (L.E.Skog) M.M.Mora & J.L.Clark
- Trichodrymonia pedunculata (L.E.Skog) M.M.Mora & J.L.Clark
- Trichodrymonia peltata (C.V.Morton) M.M.Mora & J.L.Clark
- Trichodrymonia peltatifolia (J.L.Clark & M.M.Mora) M.M.Mora & J.L.Clark
- Trichodrymonia sastrei (Wiehler) M.M.Mora & J.L.Clark
- Trichodrymonia sericea (Wiehler) M.M.Mora & J.L.Clark
- Trichodrymonia splendens (M.Freiberg) M.M.Mora & J.L.Clark
- Trichodrymonia tylocalyx (Wiehler) M.M.Mora & J.L.Clark
- Trichodrymonia ulei (Wiehler) M.M.Mora & J.L.Clark
