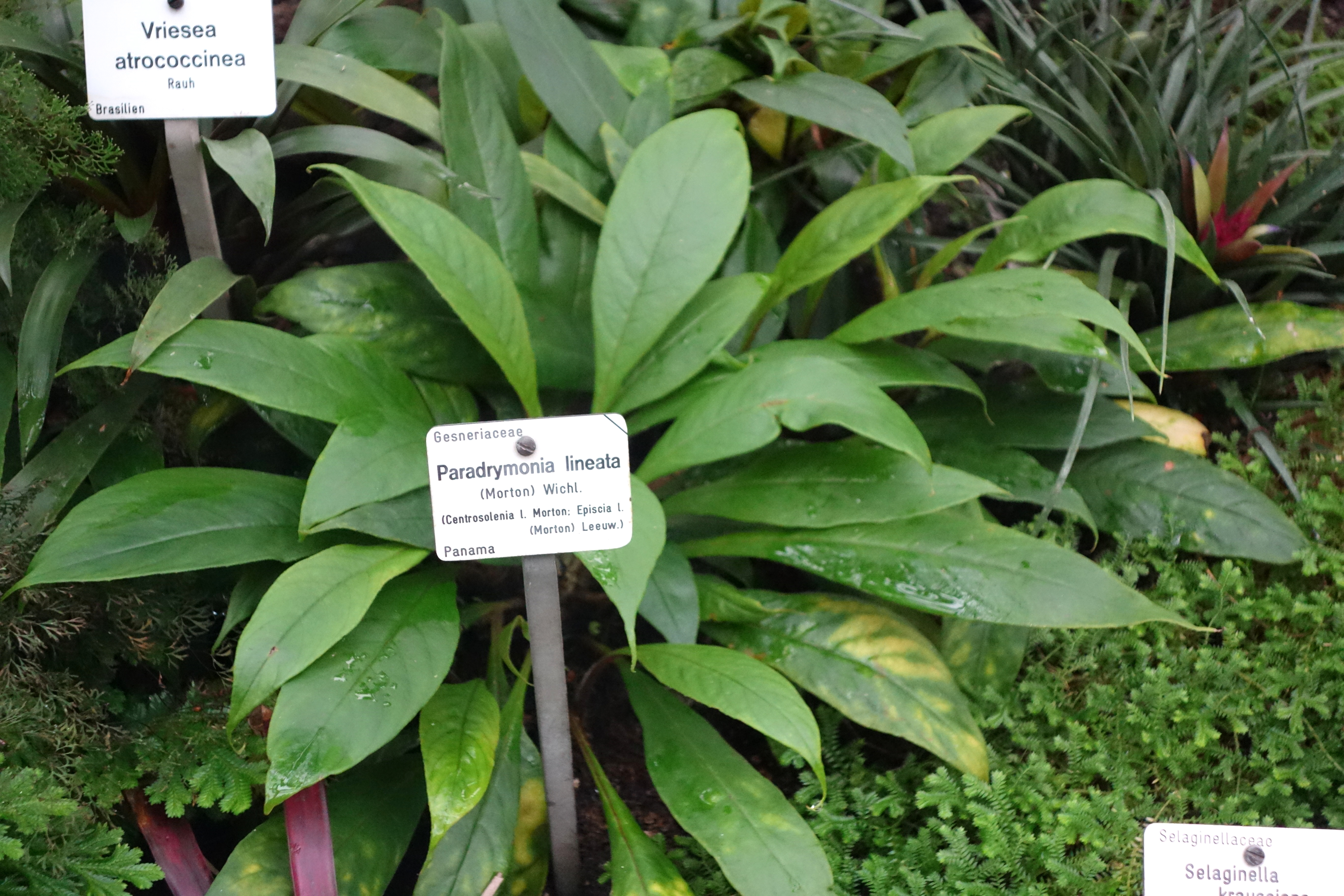

Scientific classification
- Kingdom: Plantae
- Clade: Tracheophytes
- Clade: Angiosperms
- Clade: Eudicots
- Clade: Asterids
- Order: Lamiales
- Family: Gesneriaceae
- Genus: Trichodrymonia
- Species: T. lineata

Binomial name
- Trichodrymonia lineata (C.V.Morton) M.M.Mora & J.L.Clark (2016)

Synonyms
- Centrosolenia lineata C.V.Morton (1942); Episcia lineata (C.V.Morton) Leeuwenb. (1959); Episcia lurida C.V.Morton & Raymond (1971); Paradrymonia lineata (C.V.Morton) Wiehler (1973); Paradrymonia lurida (C.V. Morton & Raymond) Wiehler (1973)

= Trichodrymonia lineata =

Species of flowering plant

Trichodrymonia lineata is a species of plant in the family Gesneriaceae. It is an epiphyte native to Costa Rica, Panama, and northwestern Colombia.
