= Trichodrymonia lacera =

Conservation status
- Endangered (IUCN 3.1)

Scientific classification
- Kingdom: Plantae
- Clade: Tracheophytes
- Clade: Angiosperms
- Clade: Eudicots
- Clade: Asterids
- Order: Lamiales
- Family: Gesneriaceae
- Genus: Trichodrymonia
- Species: T. lacera

Binomial name
- Trichodrymonia lacera (Wiehler) M.M.Mora & J.L.Clark (2016)

Synonyms
- Paradrymonia lacera Wiehler (1984)

Species of flowering plant

Trichodrymonia lacera, formerly Paradrymonia lacera, is a species of plant in the family Gesneriaceae. It is a terrestrial or epiphytic herb endemic to western Ecuador. Its natural habitat is tropical moist foothill and montane forest from 500 to 1,000 meters elevation. It is known from two collections in Cotopaxi Province. It may be extinct in the wild, but has been cultivated.
