= Trichodrymonia binata =

Conservation status
- Endangered (IUCN 3.1)

Scientific classification
- Kingdom: Plantae
- Clade: Tracheophytes
- Clade: Angiosperms
- Clade: Eudicots
- Clade: Asterids
- Order: Lamiales
- Family: Gesneriaceae
- Genus: Trichodrymonia
- Species: T. binata

Binomial name
- Trichodrymonia binata (Wiehler) M.M.Mora & J.L.Clark (2016)

Synonyms
- Paradrymonia binata Wiehler (1992)

Species of flowering plant

Trichodrymonia binata is a species of plant in the family Gesneriaceae. It is endemic to Ecuador. Its natural habitat is subtropical or tropical moist montane forests.
