= Gesneria exserta =

Conservation status
- Least Concern (IUCN 2.3)

Scientific classification
- Kingdom: Plantae
- Clade: Tracheophytes
- Clade: Angiosperms
- Clade: Eudicots
- Clade: Asterids
- Order: Lamiales
- Family: Gesneriaceae
- Genus: Gesneria
- Species: G. exserta

Binomial name
- Gesneria exserta Sw.

Synonyms
- Codonoraphia catalpiflora (Decne.) Oerst.; Codonoraphia lessertiana (Decne.) Oerst.; Codonoraphia parviflora (Decne.) Oerst.; Conradia exserta (Sw.) Mart.; Gesneria catalpiflora (Decne.) Kuntze; Gesneria corymbosa Balb. & Bertero ex DC.; Gesneria lessertiana (Decne.) Kuntze; Gesneria parviflora (Decne.) Kuntze; Gesneria quadriflora Lamb. ex Decne.; Pentaraphia catalpiflora Decne.; Pentaraphia exserta (Sw.) Decne.; Pentaraphia lessertiana Decne.; Pentaraphia parviflora Decne.

Species of flowering plant

Gesneria exserta is a species of plant in the family Gesneriaceae. It is endemic to Jamaica.
