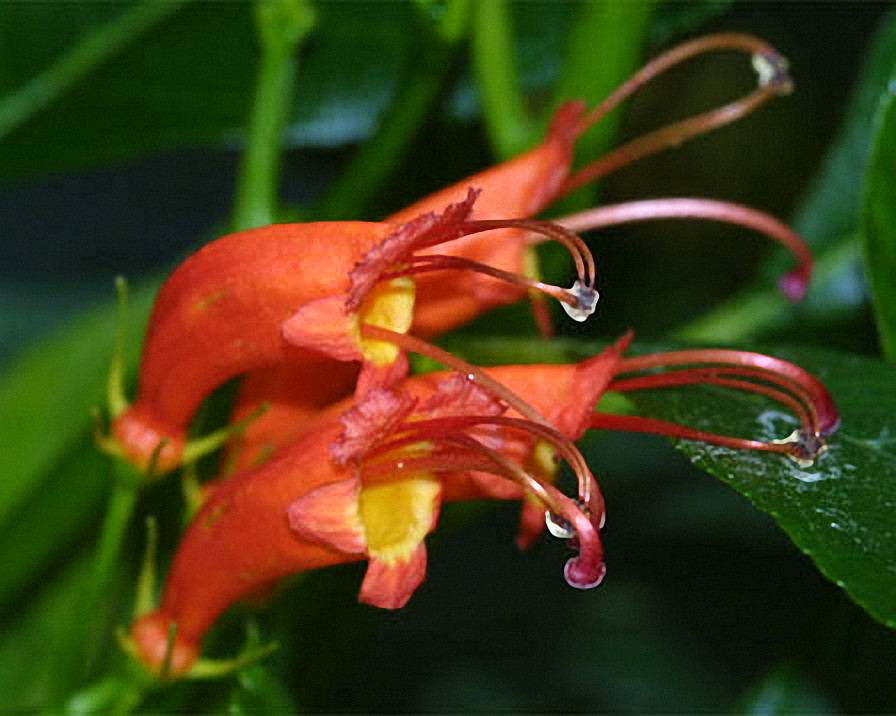
- Gesneria ventricosa

Scientific classification
- Kingdom: Plantae
- Clade: Tracheophytes
- Clade: Angiosperms
- Clade: Eudicots
- Clade: Asterids
- Order: Lamiales
- Family: Gesneriaceae
- Subfamily: Gesnerioideae
- Genus: Gesneria; Plum. ex L. (1753)

Species
- 62; see text

Synonyms
- Chorisanthera Oerst. (1858); Codonoraphia Oerst. (1858); Conradia Mart. (1829); Duchartrea Decne. (1846); Gesnera Plum. ex Adans. (1763), orth. var.; Herincquia Decne. ex Hérincq (1848); Ophianthe Hanst. (1854); Pentaraphia Lindl. (1827); Vaupellia Griseb. (1862)

= Gesneria =

Genus of flowering plants

Gesneria is a genus of flowering plants in the family Gesneriaceae. It contains 62 species which are native to islands of the Caribbean. The genus is classified in the tribe Gesnerieae along with the genera Bellonia, Pheidonocarpa, and Rhytidophyllum. Gesneria species are usually woody shrubs or subshrubs, and (with the closely related Rhytidophyllum) are unusual in the family in having alternately (rather than decussately) arranged leaves. A complete list of the accepted species and their synonyms can be found in the Smithsonian Institution's World Checklist of Gesneriaceae.

The genus name honors Conrad Gessner.

== Species ==
62 species are accepted.

- Gesneria acaulis L.
- Gesneria alpina (Urb.) Urb.
- Gesneria aspera Urb. & Ekman
- Gesneria barahonensis Urb.
- Gesneria bicolor (Urb.) Simon Joly & J.L.Clark
- Gesneria binghamii C.V.Morton
- Gesneria brachysepala Urb. & Ekman
- Gesneria bracteosa Urb.
- Gesneria brevifolia Urb.
- Gesneria bullata Urb. & Ekman
- Gesneria calycina Sw.
- Gesneria calycosa (Hook.) Kuntze
- Gesneria celsioides (Griseb.) Urb.
- Gesneria christii Urb.
- Gesneria citrina Urb.
- Gesneria clandestina (Griseb.) Urb.
- Gesneria clarensis Britton & P.Wilson
- Gesneria clasei J.L.Clark
- Gesneria × cornuta Simon Joly
- Gesneria cubensis (Decne.) Kuntze
- Gesneria cuneifolia (DC.) Fritsch
- Gesneria decapleura Urb.
- Gesneria depressa (Griseb.) Urb.
- Gesneria duchartreoides (C.Wright) Urb.
- Gesneria ekmanii Urb.
- Gesneria exserta Sw.
- Gesneria ferruginea (C.Wright) Urb.
- Gesneria filipes Alain
- Gesneria flava F.Lamb.bis, Simon Joly & J.L.Clark
- Gesneria fruticosa (L.) Kuntze
- Gesneria glandulosa (Griseb.) Urb.
- Gesneria gloxinioides (Griseb.) Urb.
- Gesneria haitiensis L.E.Skog
- Gesneria harrisii Urb.
- Gesneria heterochroa Urb.
- Gesneria humilis L.
- Gesneria hybocarpa Urb. & Ekman
- Gesneria hypoclada Urb. & Ekman
- Gesneria jamaicensis Britton
- Gesneria lanceolata Urb. & Ekman
- Gesneria libanensis Linden ex C.Morren
- Gesneria nipensis Britton & P.Wilson
- Gesneria odontophylla Urb. & Ekman
- Gesneria onychocalyx L.E.Skog
- Gesneria pachyclada Urb.
- Gesneria parvifolia Alain
- Gesneria pauciflora Urb.
- Gesneria pedicellaris Alain
- Gesneria pedunculosa (DC.) Fritsch
- Gesneria pulverulenta Alain
- Gesneria pumila Sw.
- Gesneria purpurascens Urb.
- Gesneria quisqueyana Alain
- Gesneria radiata J.L.Clark & Cinea
- Gesneria reticulata (Griseb.) Urb.
- Gesneria salicifolia (Griseb.) Urb.
- Gesneria scabra Sw.
- Gesneria sintenisii Urb.
- Gesneria sylvicola Alain
- Gesneria tuberifera J.L.Clark & T.Clase
- Gesneria ventricosa Sw.
- Gesneria viridiflora (Decne.) Kuntze
- Gesneria wrightii Urb.
