= Hans Wiehler =

German botanist

Hans Joachim Wiehle
- Born: 8 July 1930; Klettendorf, Pomerania, West Prussia (now Poland)
- Died: March 2003 (aged 72); Fiji
- Education: Goshen College, Goshen, Indiana; Goshen Biblical Seminary; Cornell University; University of Miami (PhD 1979)
- Known for: Classification of the Gesneriaceae
- Scientific career
- Fields: Botanist, especially the Gesneriaceae
- Institutions: Marie Selby Botanical Gardens, Sarasota
- Author abbrev. (botany): Wiehler

Hans Joachim Wiehler (8 July 1930 in Klettendorf – 2003) was a German botanist who specialized in the plant family Gesneriaceae. In 1954 he received a Bachelor of Arts degree from Goshen College in Goshen, Indiana and a Bachelor of Divinity degree from Goshen Biblical Seminary in 1956. He married in 1958 and remained in the United States for the rest of his life. He obtained a master's degree in botany from Cornell University and in 1979 a PhD in Botany from the University of Miami. Wiehler was on the staff of the Marie Selby Botanical Gardens from 1973 until 1982, when he left Selby to found the Gesneriad Research Foundation in Sarasota, Florida.

Wiehler tended to be a taxonomic "splitter" but many of his generic rearrangements have found acceptance: the segregation of Gasteranthus from Besleria, of Alsobia, Chrysothemis, Nautilocalyx, and Paradrymonia from Episcia, and of Moussonia from Kohleria, have all withstood the tests of recent molecular phylogenies. However, most gesneriad specialists have not accepted his segregation of Bucinellina, Dalbergaria, Pentadenia, and Trichantha from Columnea, and his new genus Parakohleria has been synonymized under Pearcea. His rare instances of taxonomic "lumping" have not been as widely accepted; Gloxinia sensu Wiehler is a polyphyletic assemblage, recently dismembered, and no other botanists have accepted his synonymy of Rhytidophyllum and Pheidonocarpa under Gesneria.

He named the nothogenus ×Koellikohleria Wiehler (family Gesneriaceae) in Baileya, 16: 30 (1968).

Hans Wiehler died in Fiji in March 2003.
