= Pheidonocarpa =

Scientific classification
- Kingdom: Plantae
- Clade: Tracheophytes
- Clade: Angiosperms
- Clade: Eudicots
- Clade: Asterids
- Order: Lamiales
- Family: Gesneriaceae
- Genus: Pheidonocarpa; L.E.Skog (1976)
- Species: P. corymbosa

Binomial name
- Pheidonocarpa corymbosa (Sw.) L.E.Skog (1976)

Subspecies
- Pheidonocarpa corymbosa subsp. corymbosa; Pheidonocarpa corymbosa subsp. cubensis (C.V.Morton) L.E.Skog

Synonyms
- Gesneria corymbosa Sw. (1788); Heppiella corymbosa (Sw.) Urb. (1901); Pentaraphia corymbosa (Sw.) Hanst. (1865)

Genus of plants

Pheidonocarpa is a genus of flowering plants belonging to the family Gesneriaceae. It includes a single species, Pheidonocarpa corymbosa, a lithophytic subshrub native to Cuba and Jamaica.

== Subspecies ==
Two subspecies are accepted:

- Pheidonocarpa corymbosa subsp. corymbosa – Jamaica
- Pheidonocarpa corymbosa subsp. cubensis (C.V.Morton) L.E.Skog (synonyms Gesneria mortonii Wiehler, Heppiella cubensis C.V.Morton, and Pheidonocarpa cubensis (C.V.Morton) Borhidi) – eastern Cuba
