= Marie Selby Botanical Gardens =

Botanical garden in Sarasota, Florida, US

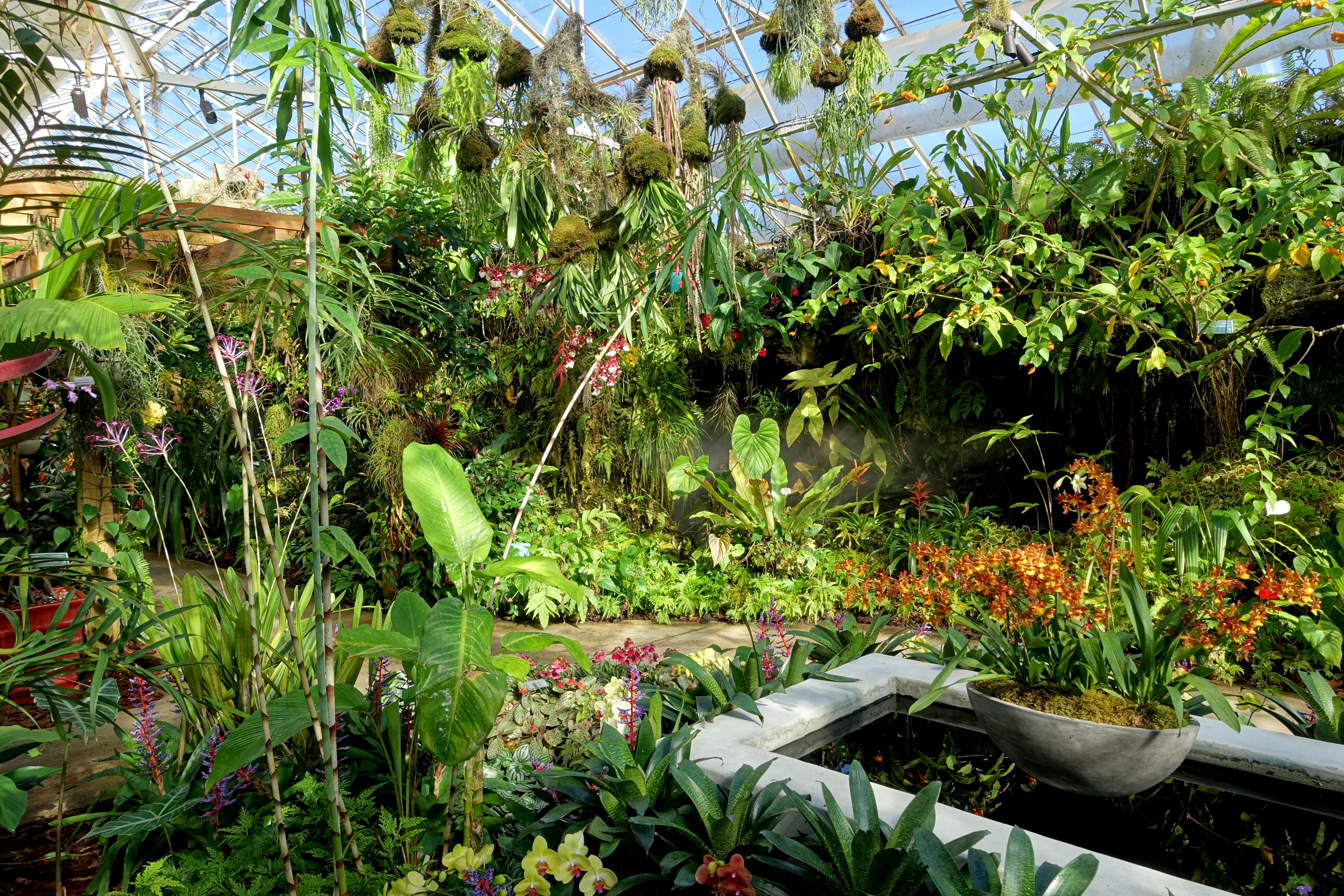
- Interactive map of Marie Selby Botanical Gardens
- Type: Botanical garden
- Location: Sarasota, Florida
- Coordinates: 27°19′40″N 82°32′25″W
- Area: 15 acres (6.1 ha)
- Website: selby.org
- The Christie Payne Mansion, home of the Museum of Botany and the Arts
- U.S. National Register of Historic Places
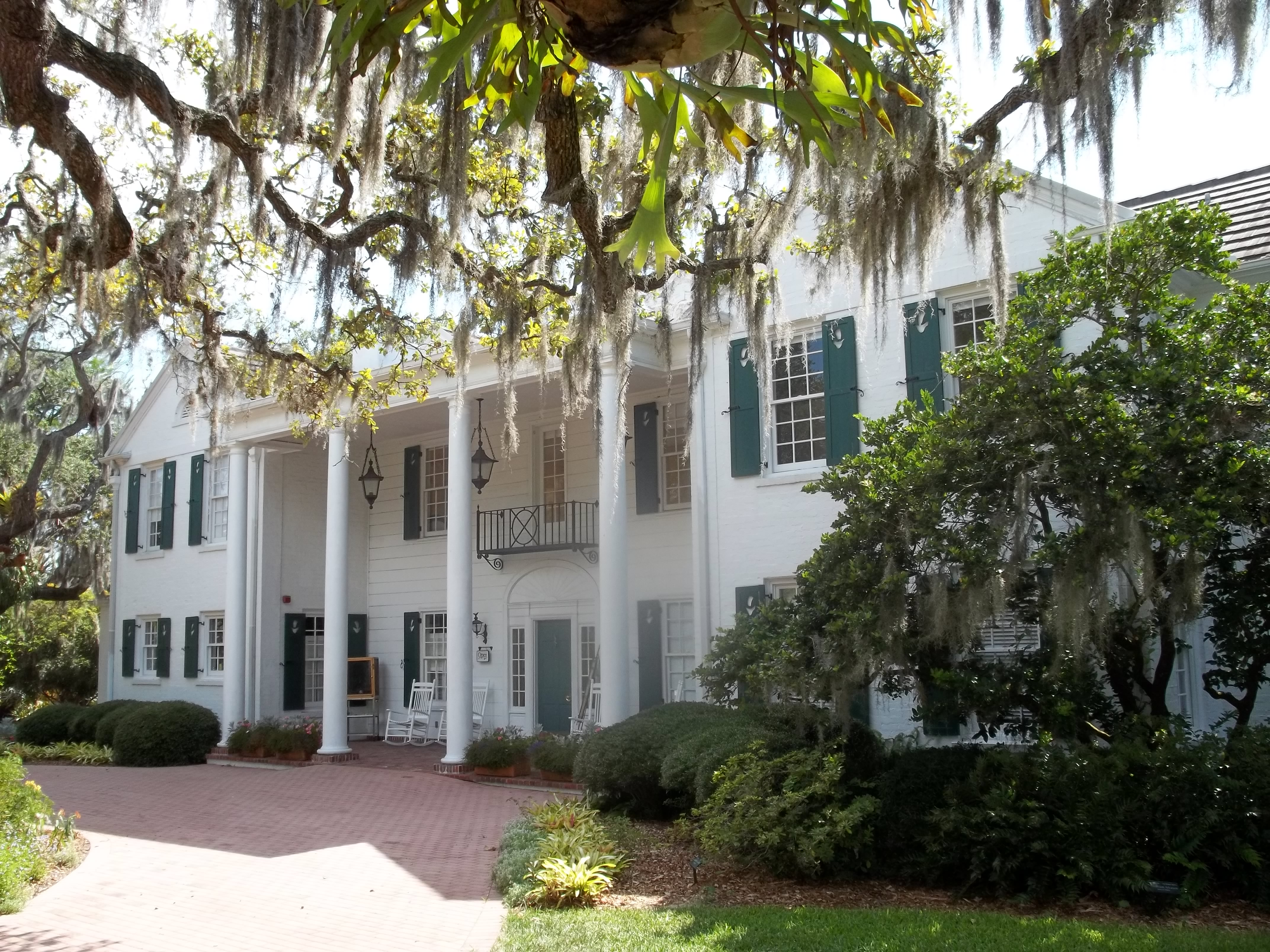

- Location within Florida Location within the United States
- Location: Sarasota, Florida
- Architectural style: Colonial Revival
- NRHP reference No.: 98001201
- Added to NRHP: September 25, 1998

The Marie Selby Botanical Gardens is a 15-acre (6.1 ha) botanical garden located at 900 South Palm Avenue in Sarasota, Florida. The Gardens are located on the grounds of the former home of Marie and William Selby.

The Marie Selby Botanical Gardens is a Smithsonian affiliate and accredited by the American Alliance of Museums.

== Flora ==
The Gardens feature preserved collections of epiphytes, feature more than 20,000 living plants, including 5,500 orchids, 3,500 bromeliads, and 1,600 other plants. The living collection is accompanied by an herbarium, with dried and preserved specimens of tropical flora; the world's second-largest spirit collection consisting of vials of mostly orchid flowers in preservative fluids; and a library. More than 150 expeditions to the tropics and subtropics have contributed to these collections. Selby Gardens' botanists have discovered or described more than 2,000 previously unknown plant species.

The Gardens maintain banyans, bamboo, live oaks, palms, mangroves, succulents, wildflowers, cycads, bromeliads, a butterfly garden, a fragrance garden, an edible garden, and a koi pond, on a site bordering Sarasota Bay. The interactive Ann Goldstein Children's Rainforest Garden is designed to help children develop a lifelong appreciation for rainforest plants.

== Divisions ==
Major divisions of the Gardens are as follows:

- The Mulford B. Foster Bromeliad Identification Center was established in 1979 in honor of Mulford Foster, one of the leading bromeliad collectors, to provide information on the horticultural and botanical aspects of the Bromeliaceae. It maintains taxonomic files for over 2800 species, genera, and subfamilies, and houses more than 2,000 photographic slides for use by individuals, institutions, and societies. It is supported by local and international bromeliad societies.
- Greenhouses contain over 10,500 accessions in more than 600 genera representing 92 plant families, including 4900 orchids, 3600 bromeliads, 660 aroids, 240 ferns, 140 gesneriads, and 1,300 other plants.
- Gardens contain approximately 2,300 recorded tropical and subtropical plantings, representing some 1,200 species, 620 genera, and 165 plant families. A significant portion is well-documented, voucher species collected from native habitats.
- The Herbarium contains approximately 106,000 specimens of tropical flora, largely neotropical, with an emphasis on epiphytes. Ecuador flora and flora of the Andes are well represented. Current collections of families, with number of types for each, is: Orchidaceae (1,200), Bromeliaceae (109), Gesneriaceae (105), Araceae (62), Marantaceae (16), Heliconiaceae (14), and miscellany (61).
- The Orchid Identification Center was established in 1975 to study and curate wild-collected and conservatory-grown orchids, and to serve as a center for their identification. It has amassed more than 20,000 taxonomic reference files, a collection of photographs, and 24,000 spirit-preserved specimens, with particular strengths in collections from Mexico, Central America, Andean South America, and Venezuela.
- The Christy Payne House houses the Museum of Botany and the Arts, the Garden's gallery for changing exhibits of botanical art and photography. It is listed on the US National Register of Historic Places, which added it on September 25, 1998.
- The Research Library houses approximately 124,000 volumes, dealing primarily with tropical plants, and especially epiphytes. It includes a rare book collection dating to the late 18th century, 14,000 issues of scientific journals, 2,500 microfiche of early botanical references and herbaria, a photographic slide collection, and other related holdings.
- The Spirit Collection contains nearly 28,000 vials of flowers in preservative fluids, making it the second-largest such collection in the world after the Royal Botanic Gardens, Kew. The collection includes 24,000 vials of the orchid family (Orchidaceae); several thousand vials of gesneriads (Gesneriaceae); and 300 vials of bromeliads (Bromeliaceae).

== Selby Gardens Research Library ==
The Selby Gardens Research Library began with a request made from William Cole's estate in 1973. Building the research library was part of the requirement when planning and building the Selby Botanical Gardens, and began acquiring the book collection even before the Botanical Gardens opened to the public. It is considered one of the finest and most respected botanical libraries in the United States, with many scientists from around the world visiting its numerous collections. Since the library opened in 1975, many people have contributed to the growing collection of botanical research, including collections from L.O. Williams, Dr. Helen Miller, and Dr. Bruce McAlpin. The library is primarily a research tool and reference for scientists and horticulturalists, along with amateur plant enthusiasts. A searchable catalogue of the collection is available online for viewing.

=== Library collections ===
- Main library collection – holds 7,000 volumes with 4,900 titles. This collection consists of ecology, systematic botany, a taxonomy of epiphytic plant families, and ethnobotany, among other subjects.
- Rare Books – the collection contains over 500 volumes, with some volumes being over 200 years old. This collection includes the Curtis' Botanical Magazine from 1788
- Serials – over 310 titles on horticultural and botanical journals, along with newsletters
- Botanical Prints – part of the rare books, but separate
- Blueprints, slides, and CDs are also available to view in the main library collection
- Microfiche collection – over 141 titles, including the hard-to-find Orchidaceae

== Selby Botanical Gardens Press ==
Selbyana
- Discipline: Botany
- Language: English
- Edited by: Bruce Holst

Publication details
- History: 1975–present
- Publisher: Selby Botanical Gardens Press
- Frequency: Biannual
- Open access: Yes
- License: CC BY-NC 4.0

Standard abbreviations
- ISO 4: Selbyana

Indexing
- ISSN: 0361-185X
- LCCN: 75650079
- JSTOR: selbyana
- OCLC no.: 612168862

Links
- Journal homepage; Online access

The Selby Botanical Gardens Press publishes the open-access research journal Selbyana, botanical books, proceedings, field guides, and posters. Selbyana, published since 1975, is a peer-reviewed scientific journal issued twice a year, focusing on research on canopy biology and tropical plants, especially epiphytes. This includes many papers on gesneriads, including valuable contributions by Hans Wiehler and Larry Skog, bromeliads and orchids.

== Other publications ==
The Sanctuary is Selby's member newsletter, published quarterly and evolving from the previous member newsletter, The Tropical Dispatch (selections from previous newsletters are available online). This newsletter typically includes a brief section on what is currently in bloom at the botanical gardens, staffing updates, a main article on the current display, upcoming events, and, occasionally, other articles of interest, such as what is being researched or other ongoing projects.

== Gallery ==
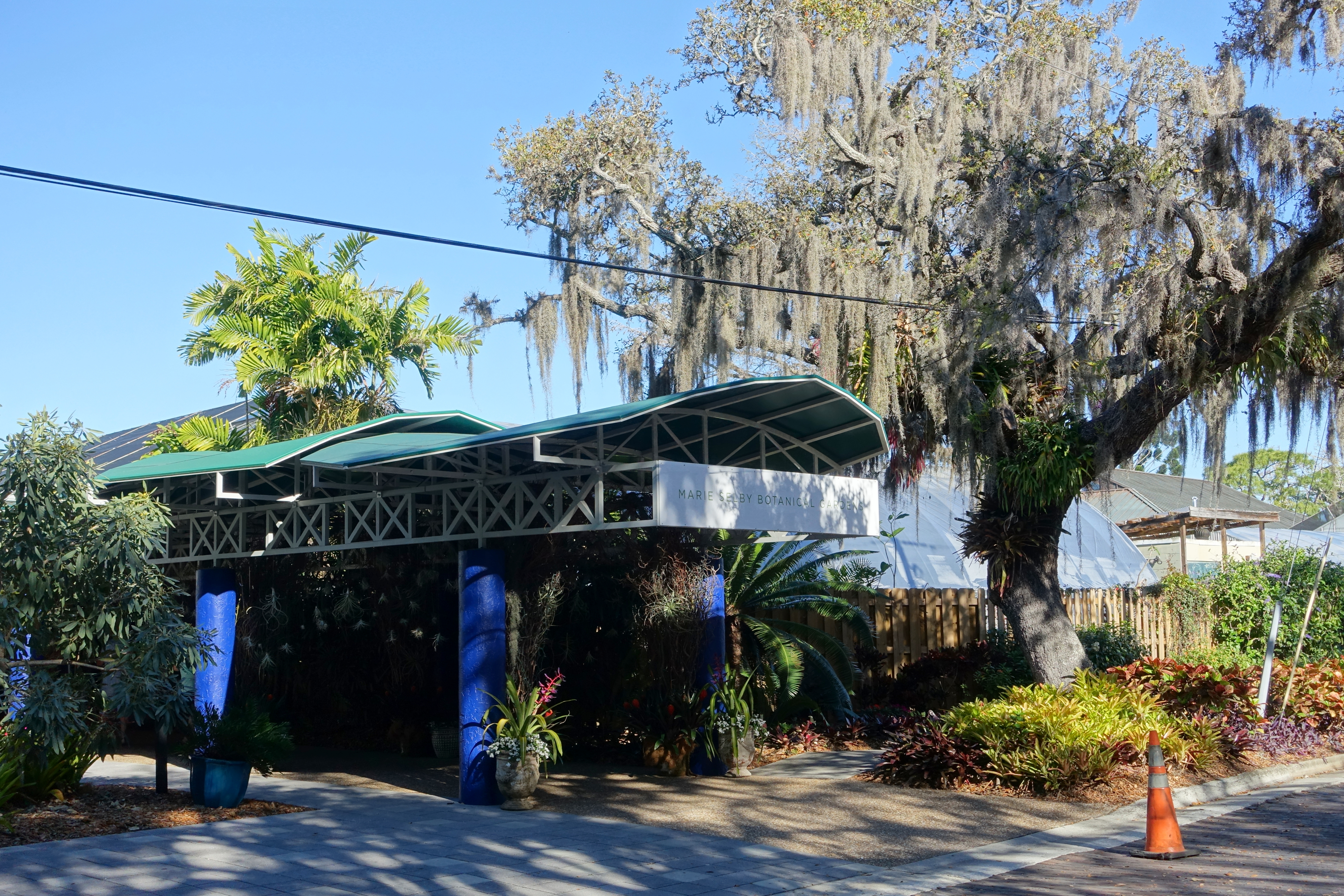
Entrance

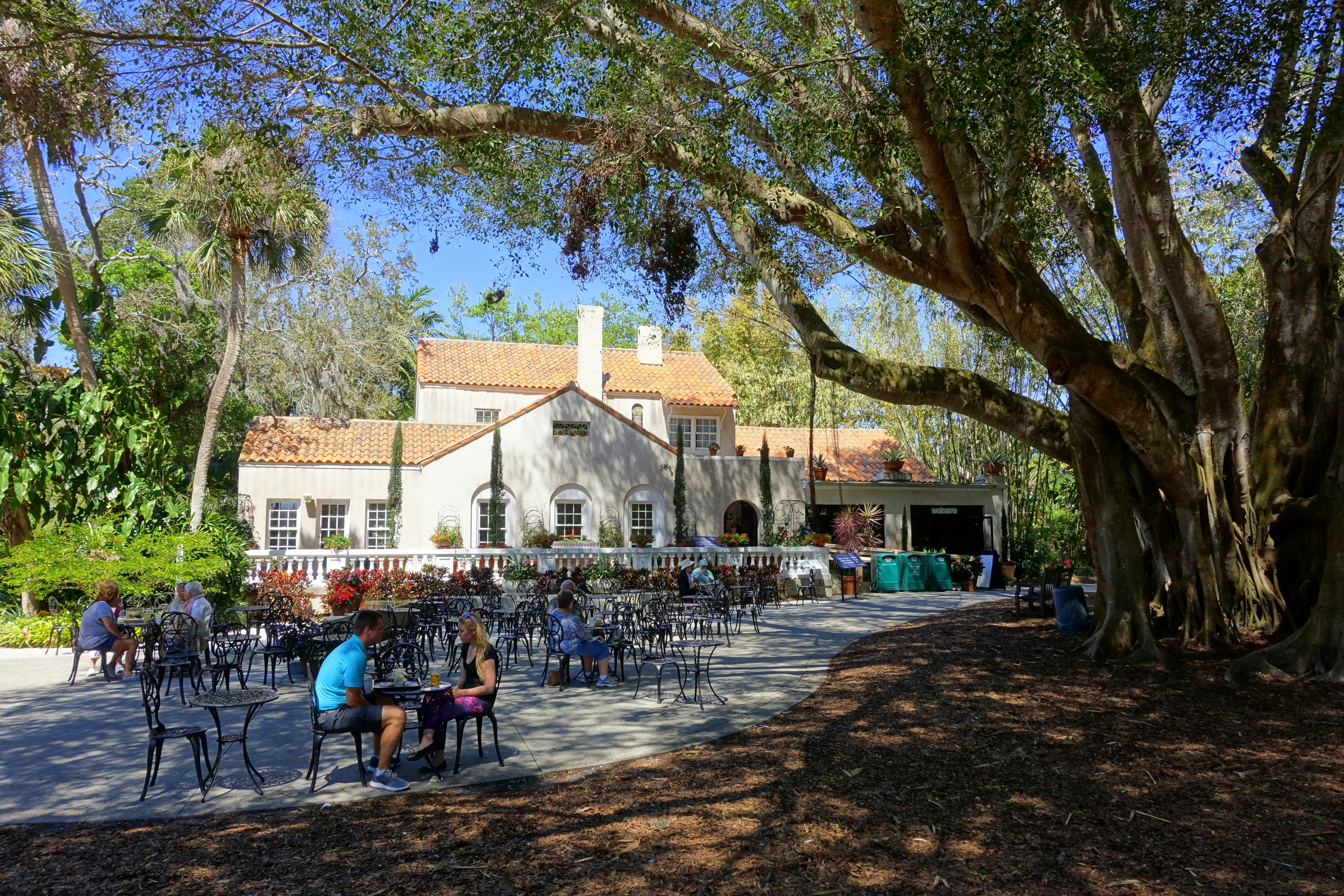
Selby House and Cafe

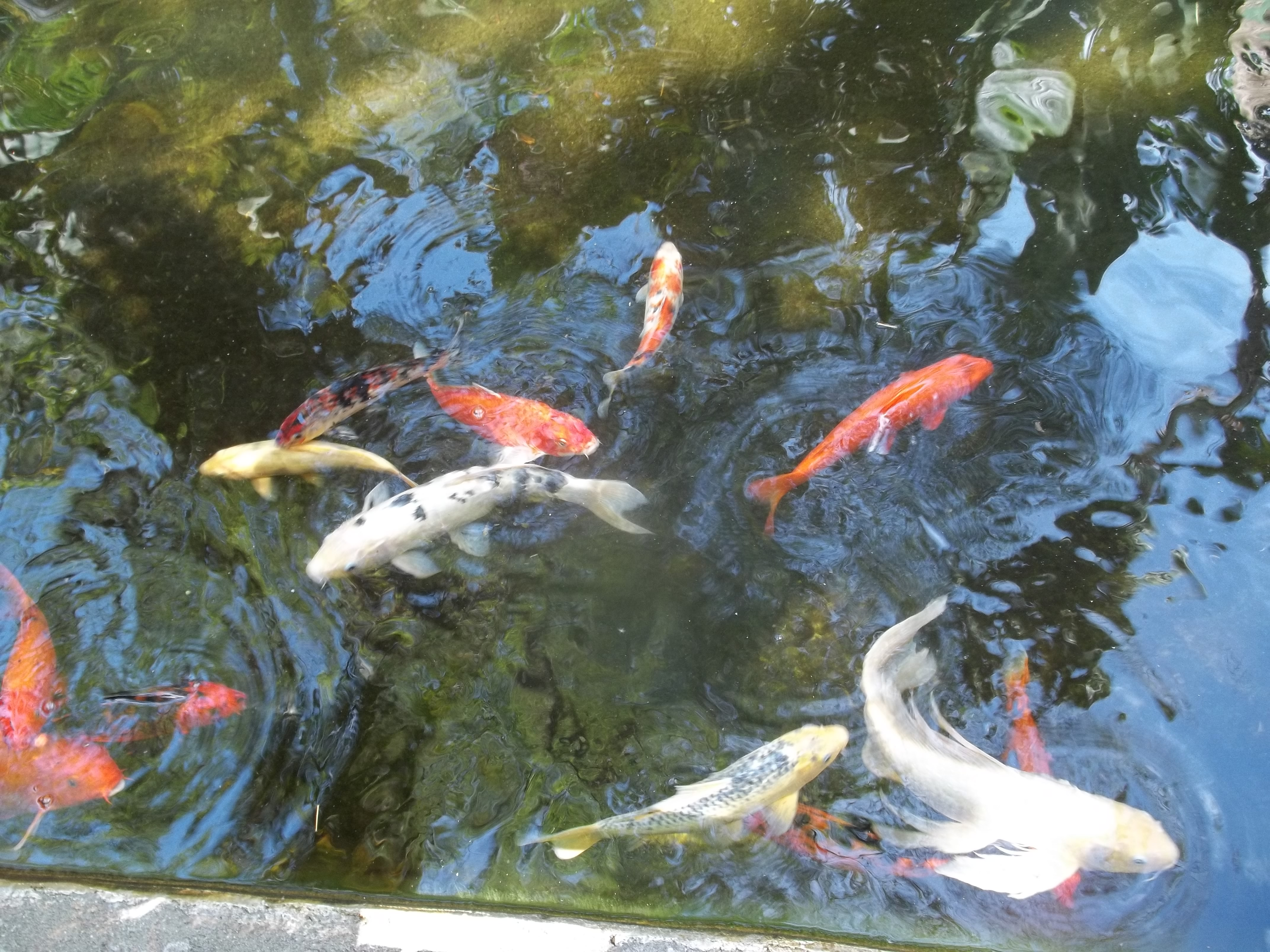
Koi pond

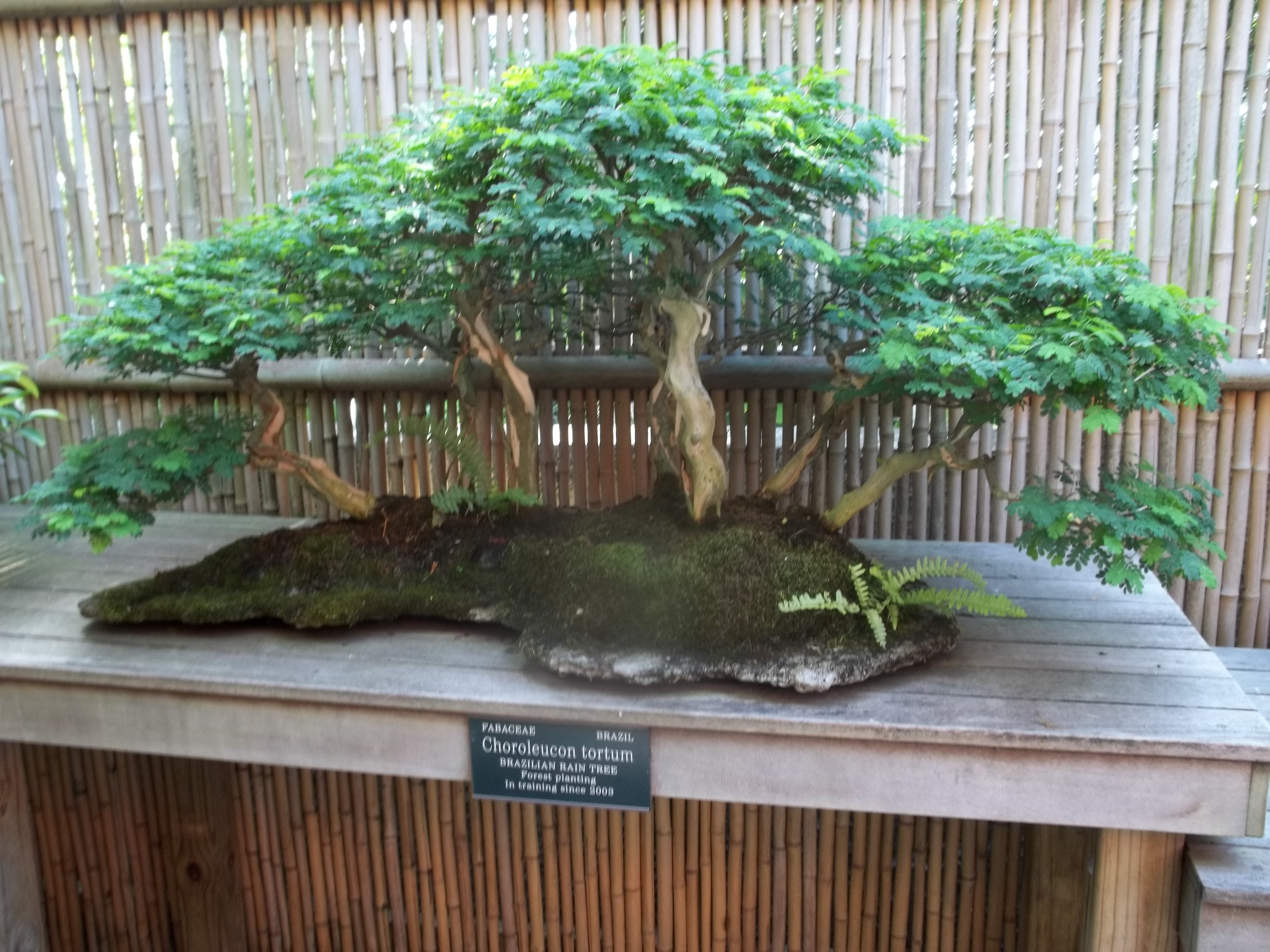
Chloroleucon tortum

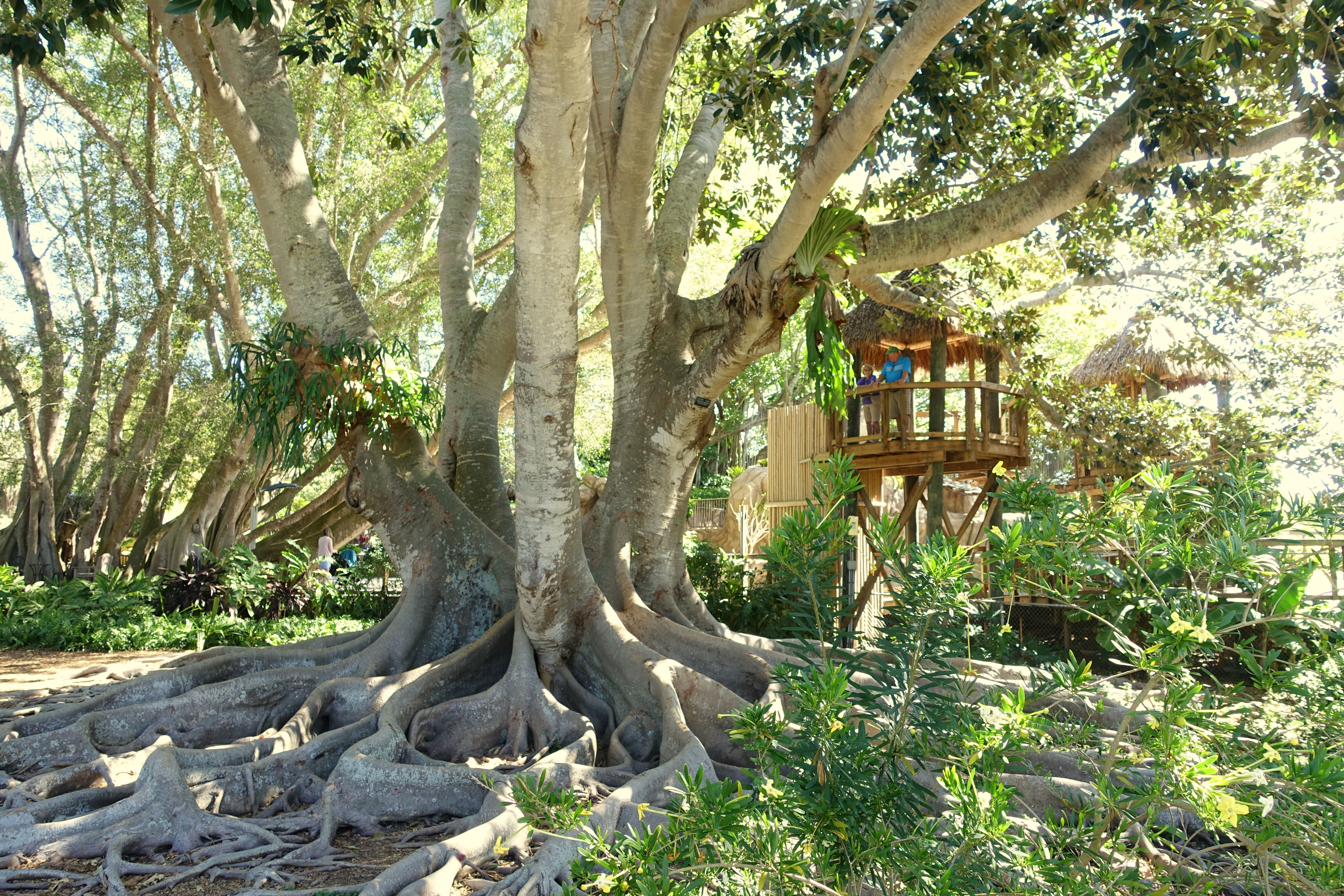

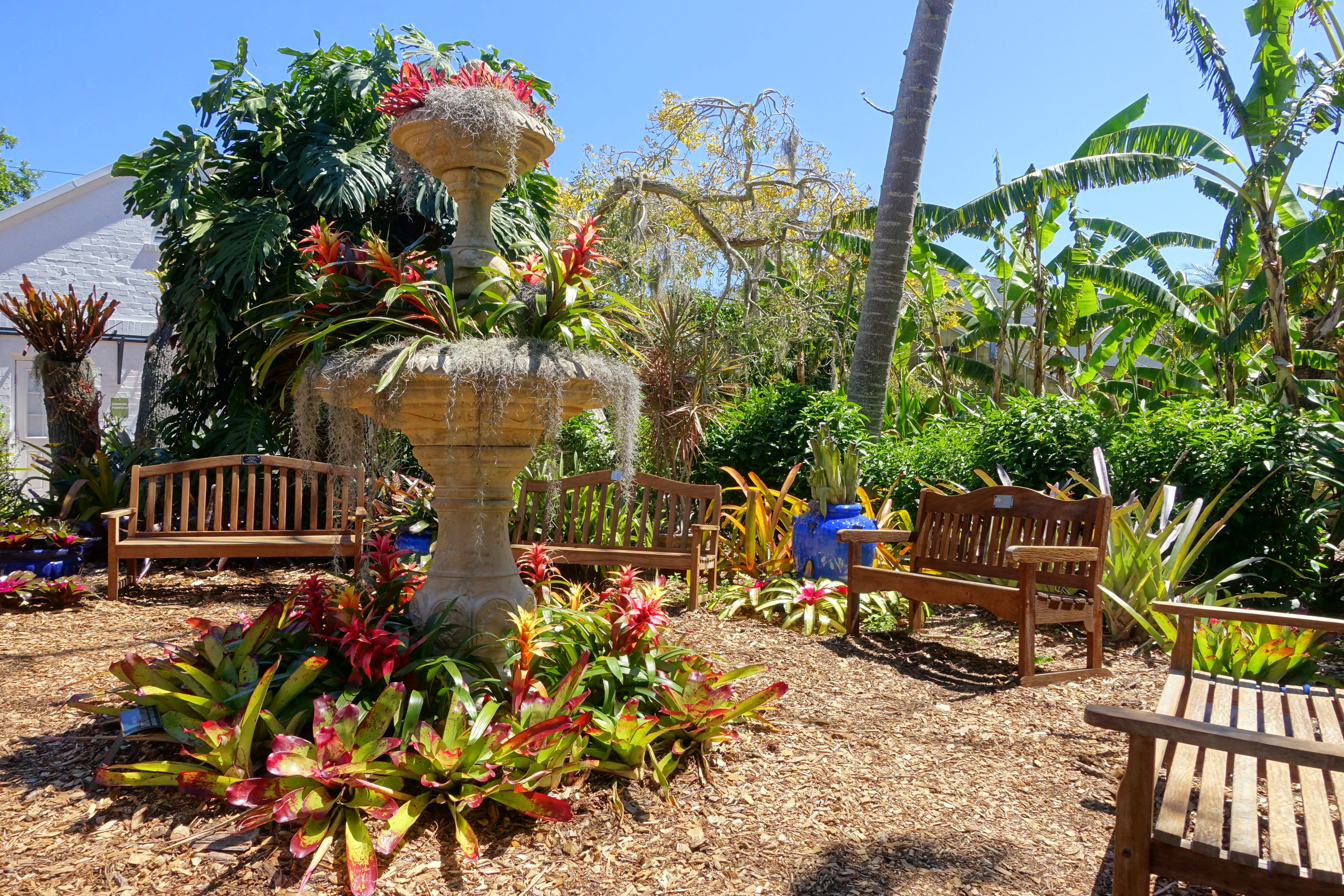

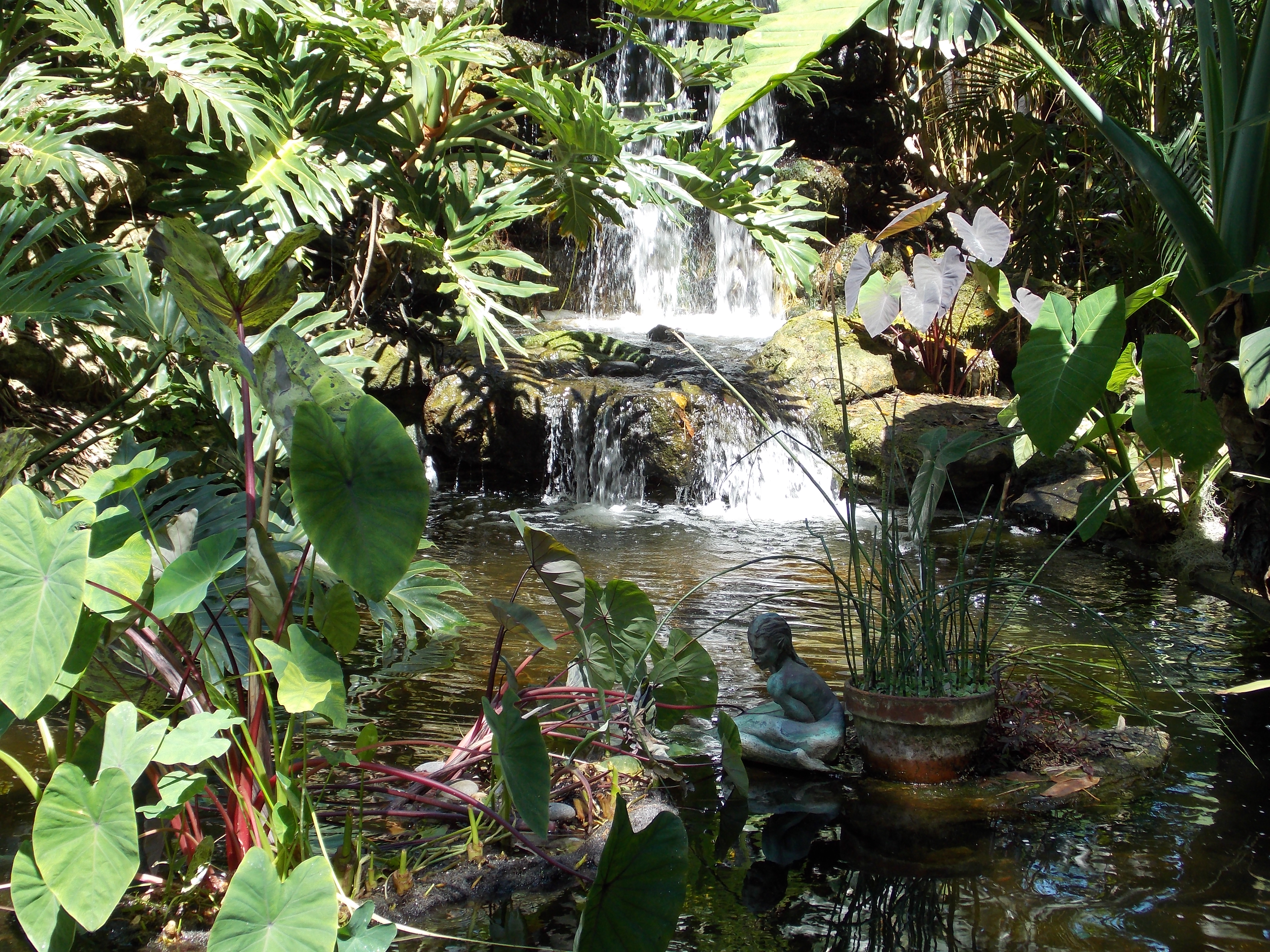

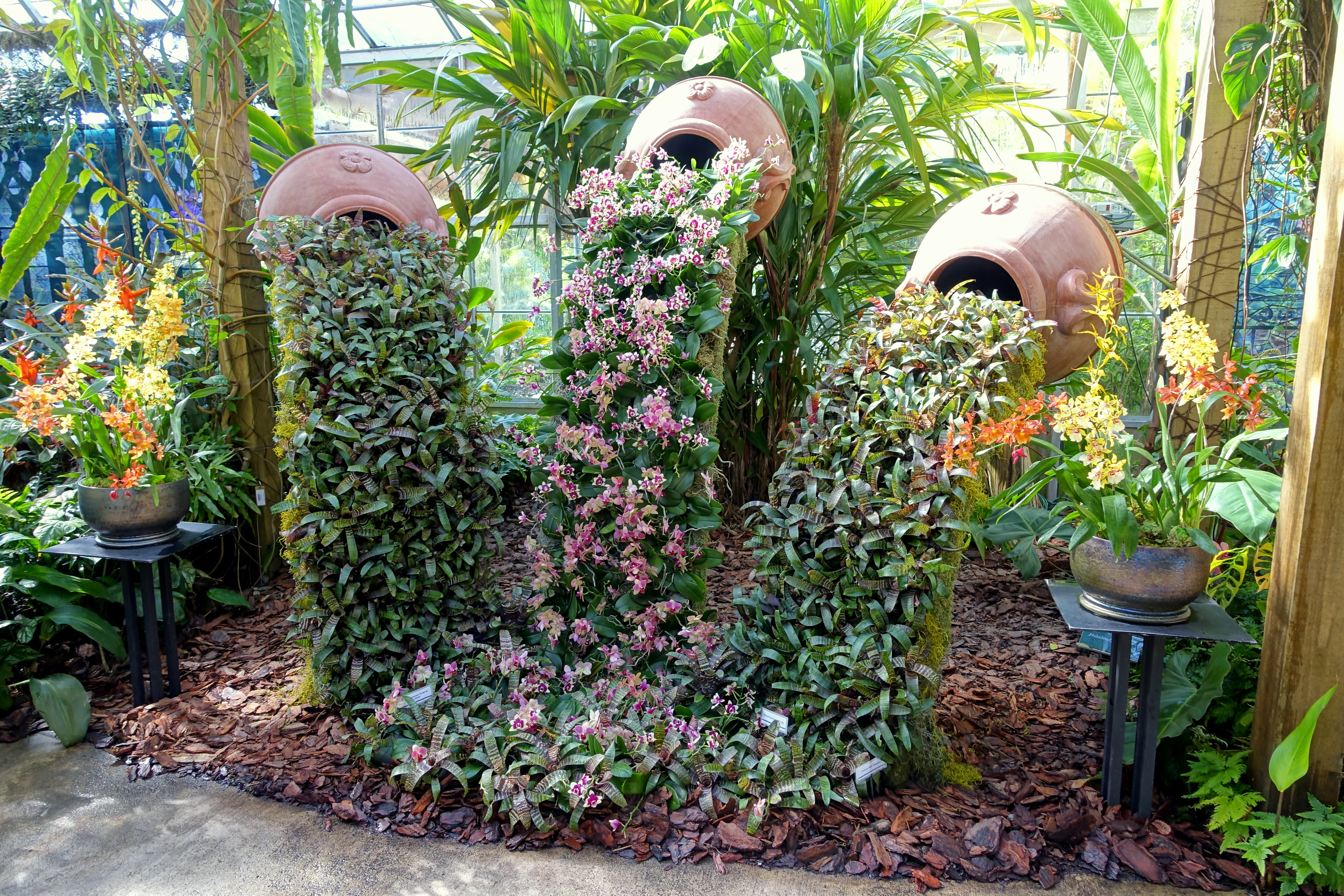

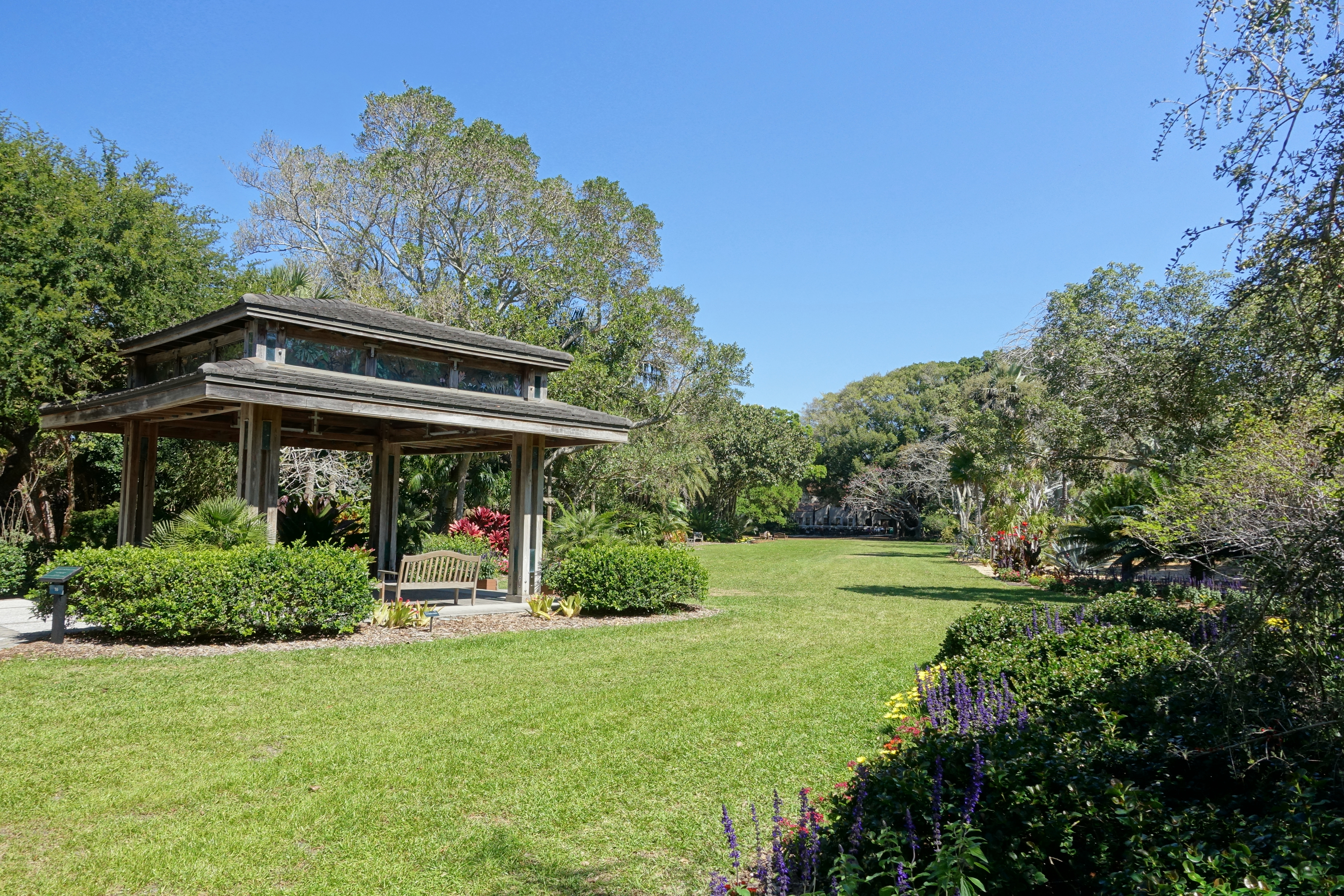
Pavilion

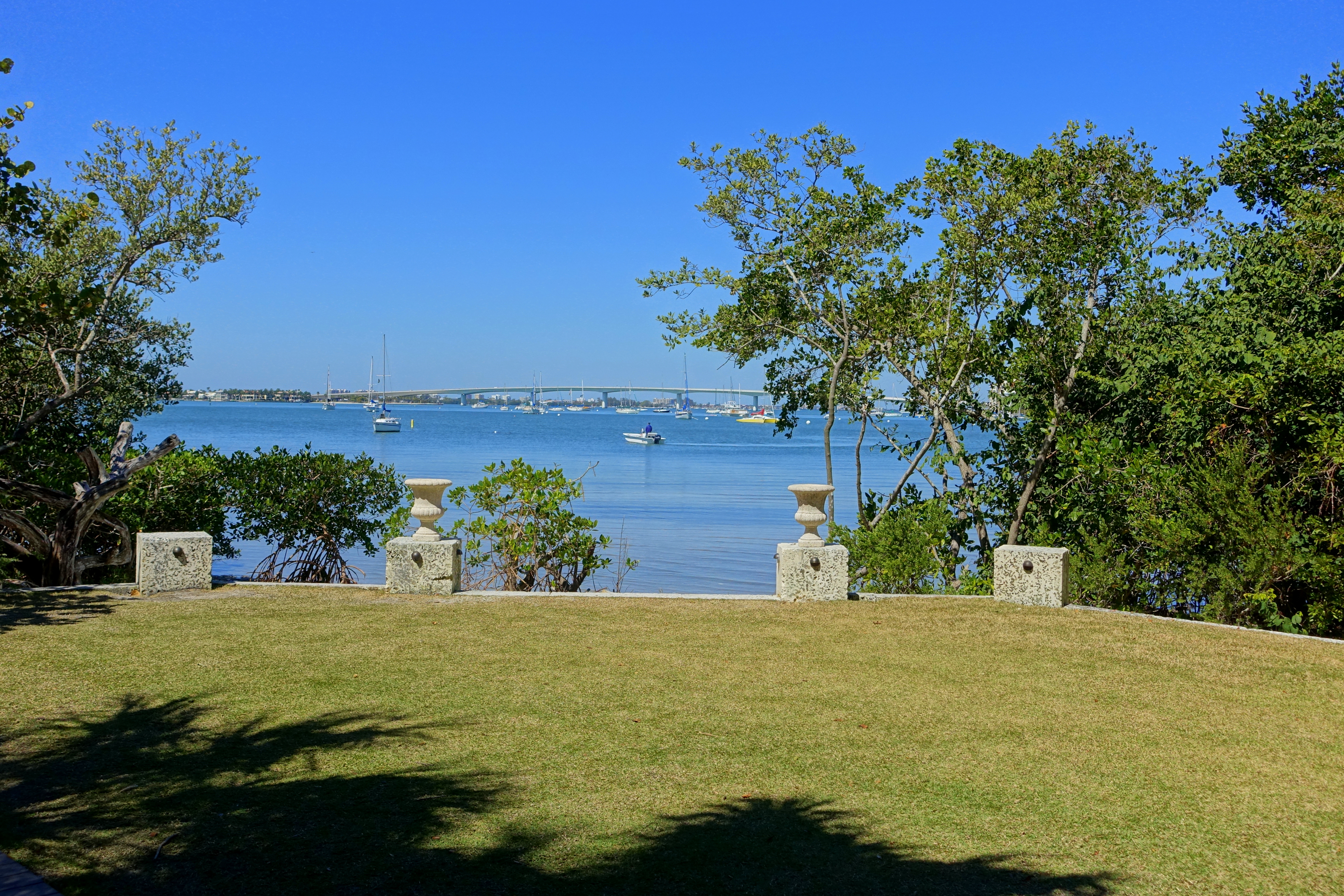
Waterside view

== See also ==
- List of botanical gardens and arboretums in the United States
