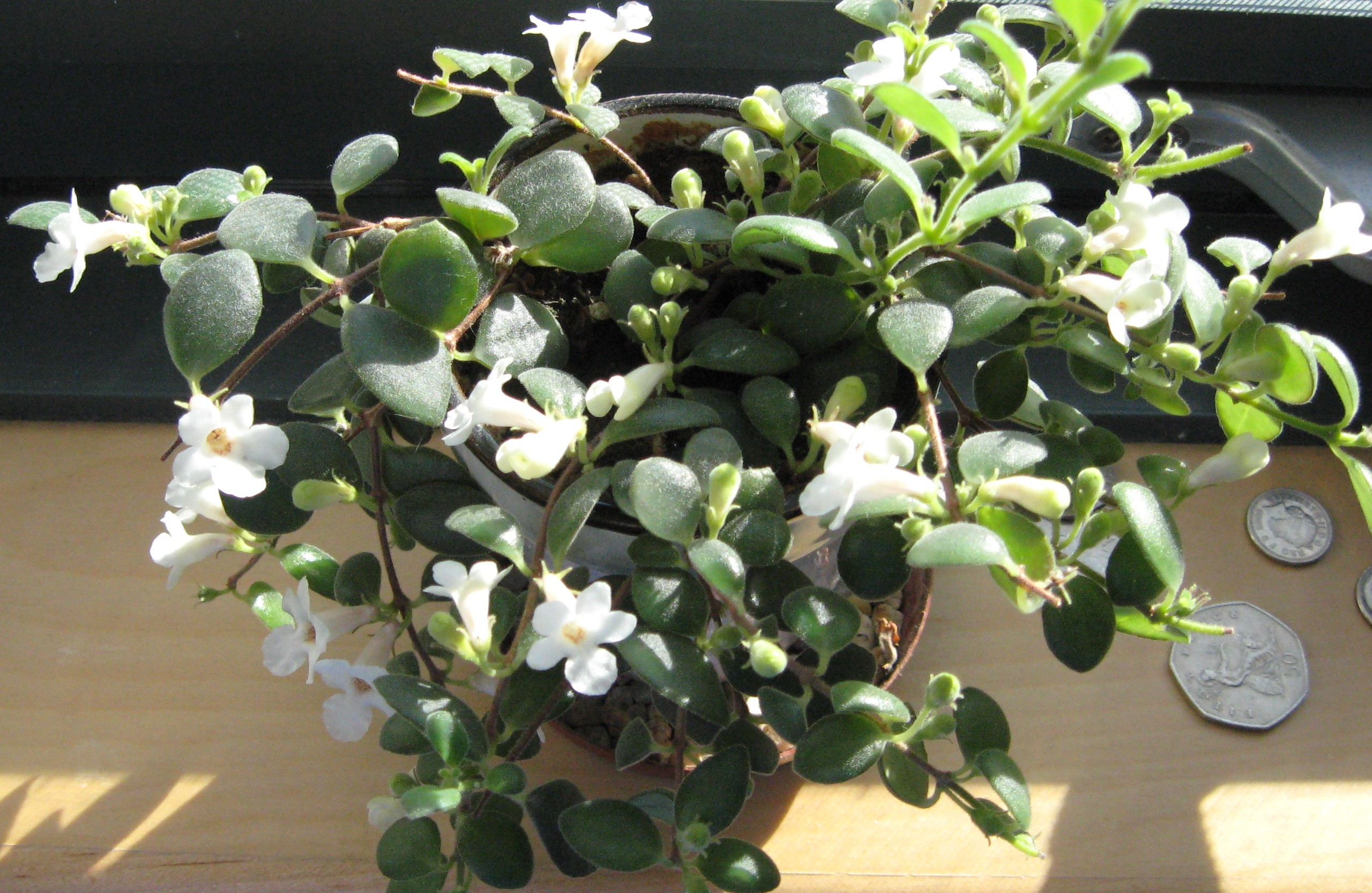
- Codonanthe carnosa

Scientific classification
- Kingdom: Plantae
- Clade: Tracheophytes
- Clade: Angiosperms
- Clade: Eudicots
- Clade: Asterids
- Order: Lamiales
- Family: Gesneriaceae
- Subfamily: Gesnerioideae
- Genus: Codonanthe (Mart.) Hanst.

Type species
- Codonanthe gracilis (Mart.) Hanst.

Species
- See text.

Synonyms
- Coccanthera K.Koch & Hanst.; Comes Buc'hoz

= Codonanthe =

Genus of epiphytes grown as houseplants

Codonanthe is a genus of mainly epiphytic plants in the family Gesneriaceae, endemic to the Atlantic Forest of Brazil. The botanical name comes from the Ancient Greek for 'bellflower'. They have white or pale pink flowers and somewhat fleshy leaves. In 2013, the genus was reduced in size when more than half of the species were transferred to Codonanthopsis. They can be grown as houseplants, particularly in hanging baskets. Artificial crosses with Nematanthus hybrids have produced the hybrid genus × Codonatanthus.

== Description ==
Codonanthe species are subshrubs, generally growing as epiphytes, occasionally on rocks. Unlike Codonanthopsis species, they never grow in ant gardens. They have stems with few branches, which may be upright, creeping or hanging, and often produce roots along their length (adventitious roots). The leaves have a short or very short petiole (stalk), and are fleshy, with either smooth or hairy surfaces. The flowers, produced in the upper leaf axils, on pedicels up to 1 cm (0.4 in) long, are either solitary or in groups of a few together, rarely in the form of a cyme. The five petals are fused at the base with spreading, rounded tips, overall either funnel-shaped or expanded towards the base (ventricose). The flowers are white or pale pink, sometimes with yellow or maroon markings, particularly inside the throat. The four stamens remain within the flowers, and have paired anthers joined by a wide connective. The fruit is a yellowish to dark orange berry with seeds that are 1–1.2 mm (0.04–0.05 in) long.

== Taxonomy ==
The taxon was first described by Carl Friedrich Philipp von Martius in 1829 as a section of the genus Hypocyrta. (Hypocyrta is now regarded as a synonym of Nematanthus.) It was raised to the full genus Codonanthe by Johannes von Hanstein in 1854. The genus grew to contain about 18 species, but a series of molecular phylogenetic studies showed that it was not monophyletic, some species being more closely related to species of Codonanthopsis than to other Codonanthe species, and in 2013, ten species were transferred to that genus.

In one classification scheme for the family Gesneriaceae, Codonanthe is placed in the subfamily Gesnerioideae, tribe Gesnerieae, subtribe Columneinae. Within the subtribe, it forms a clade with Nematanthus, Codonanthopsis and Lesia:

- - Lesia
  - - Codonanthopsis
    - - Codanthe
      - Nematanthus

=== Species ===
As of April 2021, Plants of the World Online accepted the following species:

- Codonanthe carnosa (Gardner) Hanst.
- Codonanthe cordifolia Chautems
- Codonanthe devosiana Lem.
- Codonanthe formicarum Fritsch.
- Codonanthe gibbosa Rossini & Chautems
- Codonanthe gracilis (Mart.) Hanst.
- Codonanthe mattos-silvae Chautems
- Codonanthe venosa Chautems

Former species

- Codonanthe elegans Wiehler = Codonanthopsis elegans (Wiehler) Chautems & Mat.Perret
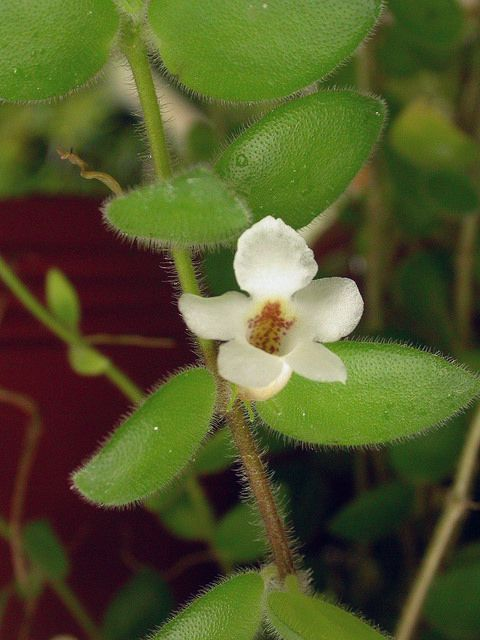
C. devosiana

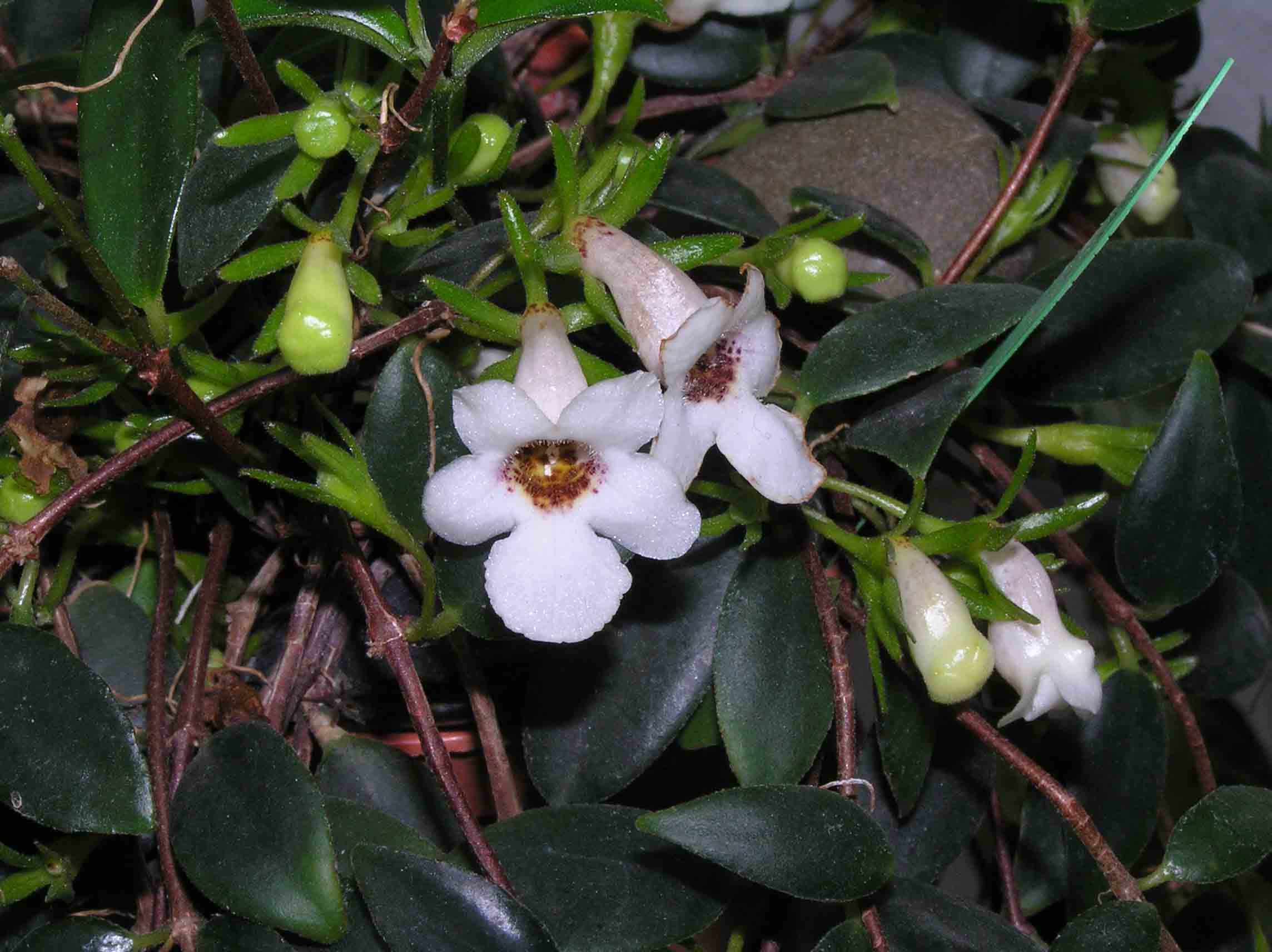
C. gracilis

== Distribution and habitat ==
Codonanthe species are endemic to Brazil, where they are found in the Atlantic Forest.

== Cultivation ==
Codonanthe species are cultivated as ornamental plants. They can be grown in hanging baskets. Their relatively small size and free-flowering habit make them easier to grow than other epiphytic members of the family Gesneriaceae, although their flowers are smaller and less colourful than those of some other genera. A well-drained soilless mix is recommended, and humidity levels over 50% improve flowering and fruiting.

Codonanthe gracilis was crossed with Nematanthus hybrids in the United States by W. R. Saylor. Two of the resulting cultivars are × Codonatanthus 'Fiesta' and × Codonatanthus 'Aurora'.
