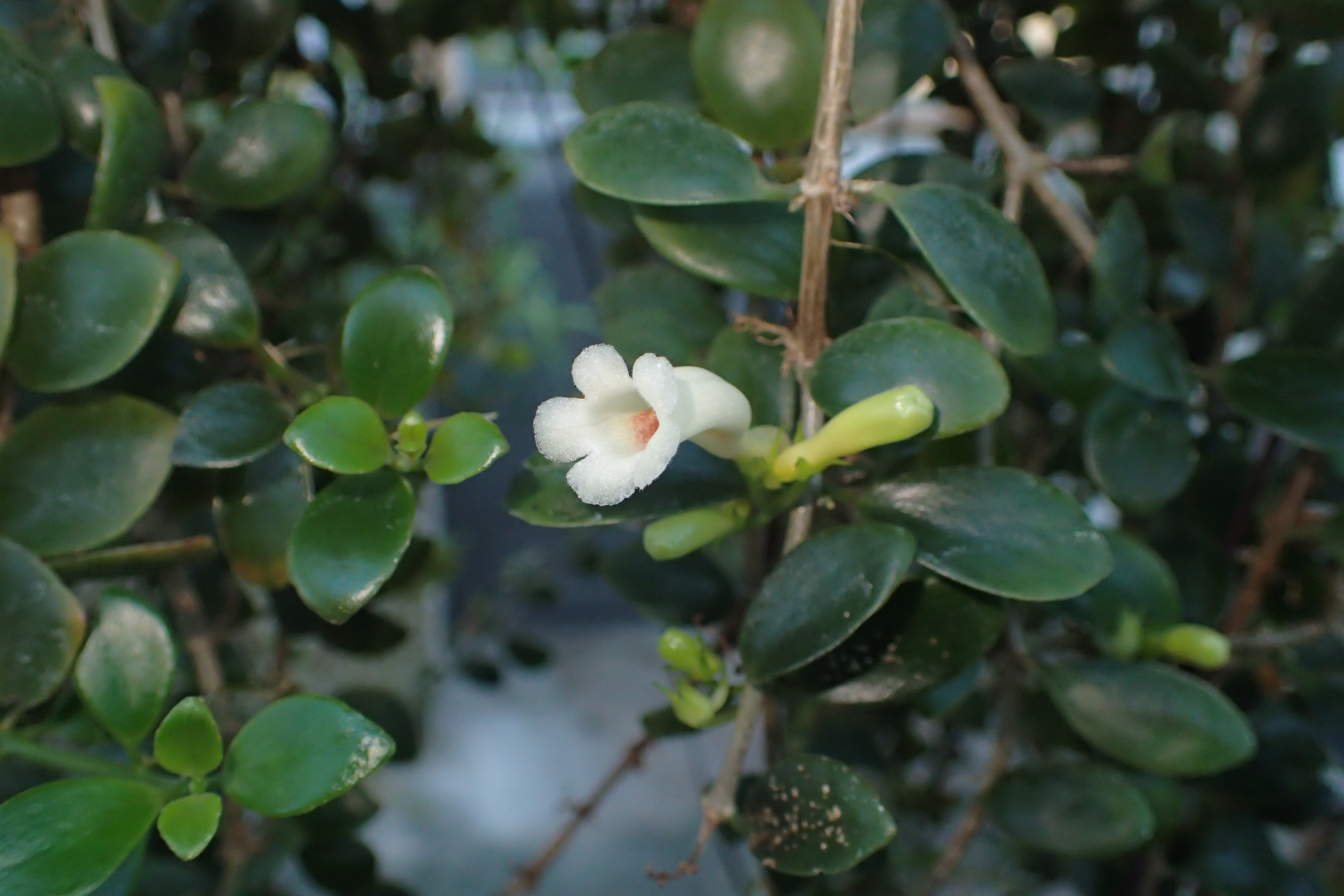
- Codonanthopsis macradenia in cultivation

Scientific classification
- Kingdom: Plantae
- Clade: Tracheophytes
- Clade: Angiosperms
- Clade: Eudicots
- Clade: Asterids
- Order: Lamiales
- Family: Gesneriaceae
- Subfamily: Gesnerioideae
- Genus: Codonanthopsis; Mansf.

= Codonanthopsis =

Genus of flowering plants

Codonanthopsis is a genus of flowering plants in the family Gesneriaceae. Its native range is from southern Mexico through tropical America to Bolivia and most of Brazil. Codonanthopsis species are generally trailing epiphytes with pale flowers. Most have a mutualistic relationship with tree-living ants: the plants provide the ants with food, including nectar, and give their nests structure and support, while the ants disperse the plants' seeds. The genus was considerably expanded in 2013 when species were transferred from Codonanthe. Some Codonanthopsis species are cultivated as houseplants, when they may be grown in hanging baskets.

== Description ==
Codonanthopsis species are subshrubs, generally growing as epiphytes, often in ant gardens (unlike Codonanthe species which never grow in ant gardens). They have stems usually 0.3–1 m (1–3 ft) long, occasionally 2 m (7 ft) long, with few branches. The stems are usually hanging or creeping, and sometimes produce roots along their length (adventitious roots). The fleshy leaves are variable in form, all the same in some species, or of two sizes in others. Reddish nectaries are often present on the underside of the leaves. The flowers, produced in the upper leaf axils on short pedicels, are either solitary or in groups of a few together, rarely in groups of up to 12. The flowers are funnel-shaped overall with five petals fused at the base, a short spur and spreading, rounded tips. They are white, yellowish or pinkish, often with yellow or red markings on the spur and in the throat. A nectary is present. The four stamens remain within the flowers, and have paired anthers joined by a narrow connective. The fruit is a variously coloured berrylike capsule with seeds that are 2–3 mm (0.08–0.12 in) long.

== Taxonomy ==
The genus was created in 1934 by Rudolf Mansfeld. He included two species, Codonanthopsis huebneri and Codonanthopsis ulei. The first is now considered only to be a synonym of the second. Another species, Codonanthopsis dissimulata, was transferred from the genus Codonanthe in 1978.

For over 30 years, the genus contained only these two species, but then a series of molecular phylogenetic studies showed that the related genus Codonanthe was not monophyletic, with a group of its species more closely related to Codonanthopsis (as then circumscribed) than to the remaining Codonanthe species. In 2013, ten species were transferred from Codonanthe to Codonanthopsis.

In one classification scheme for the family Gesneriaceae, Codonanthopsis is placed in the subfamily Gesnerioideae, tribe Gesnerieae, subtribe Columneinae. Within the subtribe, it forms a clade with Nematanthus, Codonanthe and Lesia:

- - Lesia
  - - Codonanthopsis
    - - Codanthe
      - Nematanthus

=== Species ===
As of April 2021, Plants of the World Online accepted the following species:

- Codonanthopsis anisophylla (Feuillet & L.E.Skog) Chautems & Mat.Perret
- Codonanthopsis calcarata (Miq.) Chautems & Mat.Perret
- Codonanthopsis caribaea (Urb.) Chautems & Mat.Perret
- Codonanthopsis chiricana (Wiehler) Chautems & Mat.Perret
- Codonanthopsis corniculata (Wiehler) Chautems & Mat.Perret
- Codonanthopsis crassifolia (H.Focke) Chautems & Mat.Perret
- Codonanthopsis dissimulata (H.E.Moore) Wiehler
- Codonanthopsis elegans (Wiehler) Chautems & Mat.Perret
- Codonanthopsis erubescens (Wiehler) Chautems & Mat.Perret
- Codonanthopsis luteola (Wiehler) Chautems & Mat.Perret
- Codonanthopsis macradenia (Donn.Sm.) Chautems & Mat.Perret
- Codonanthopsis uleana (Fritsch) Chautems & Mat.Perret
- Codonanthopsis ulei Mansf.
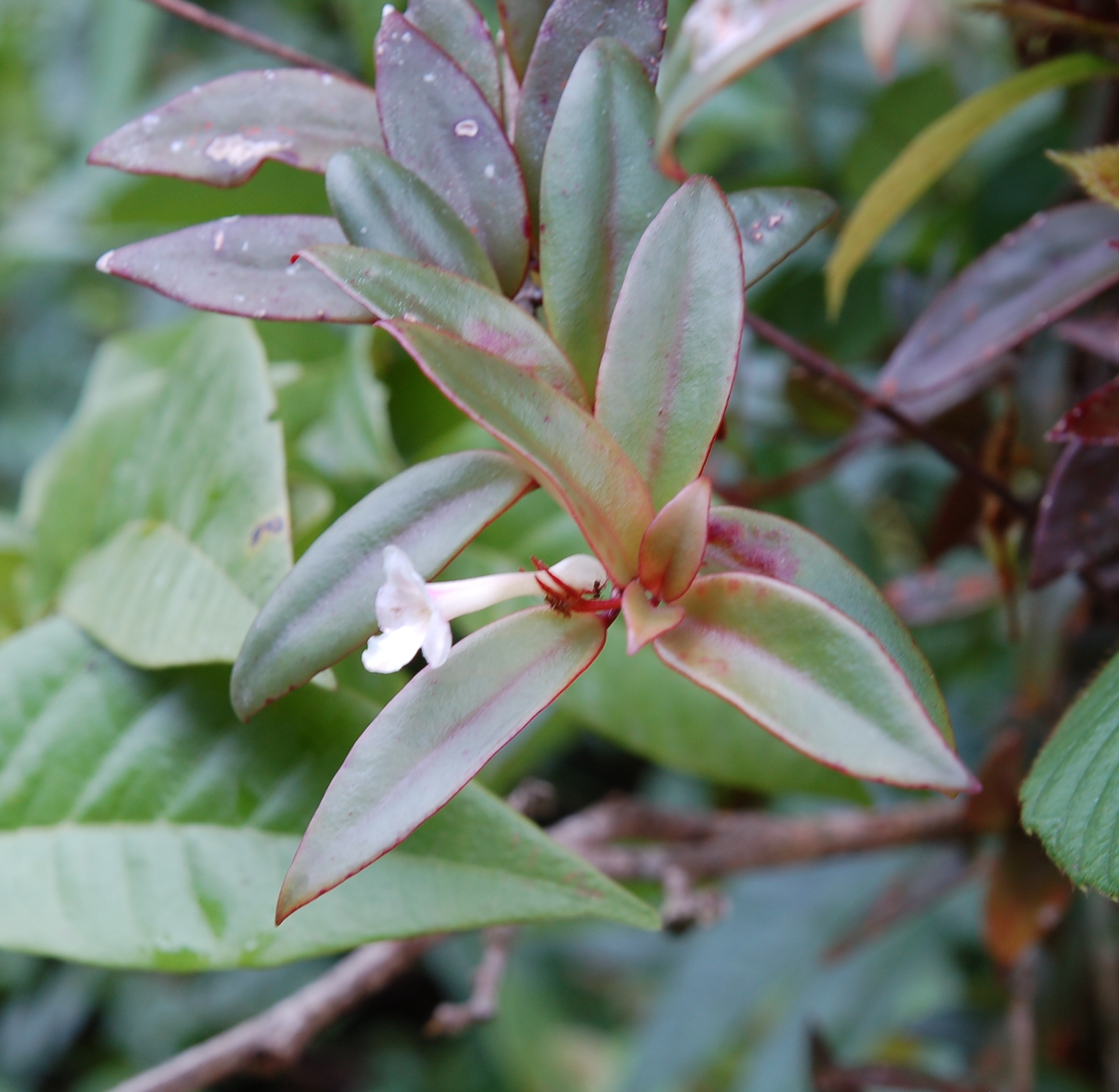
C. crassifolia

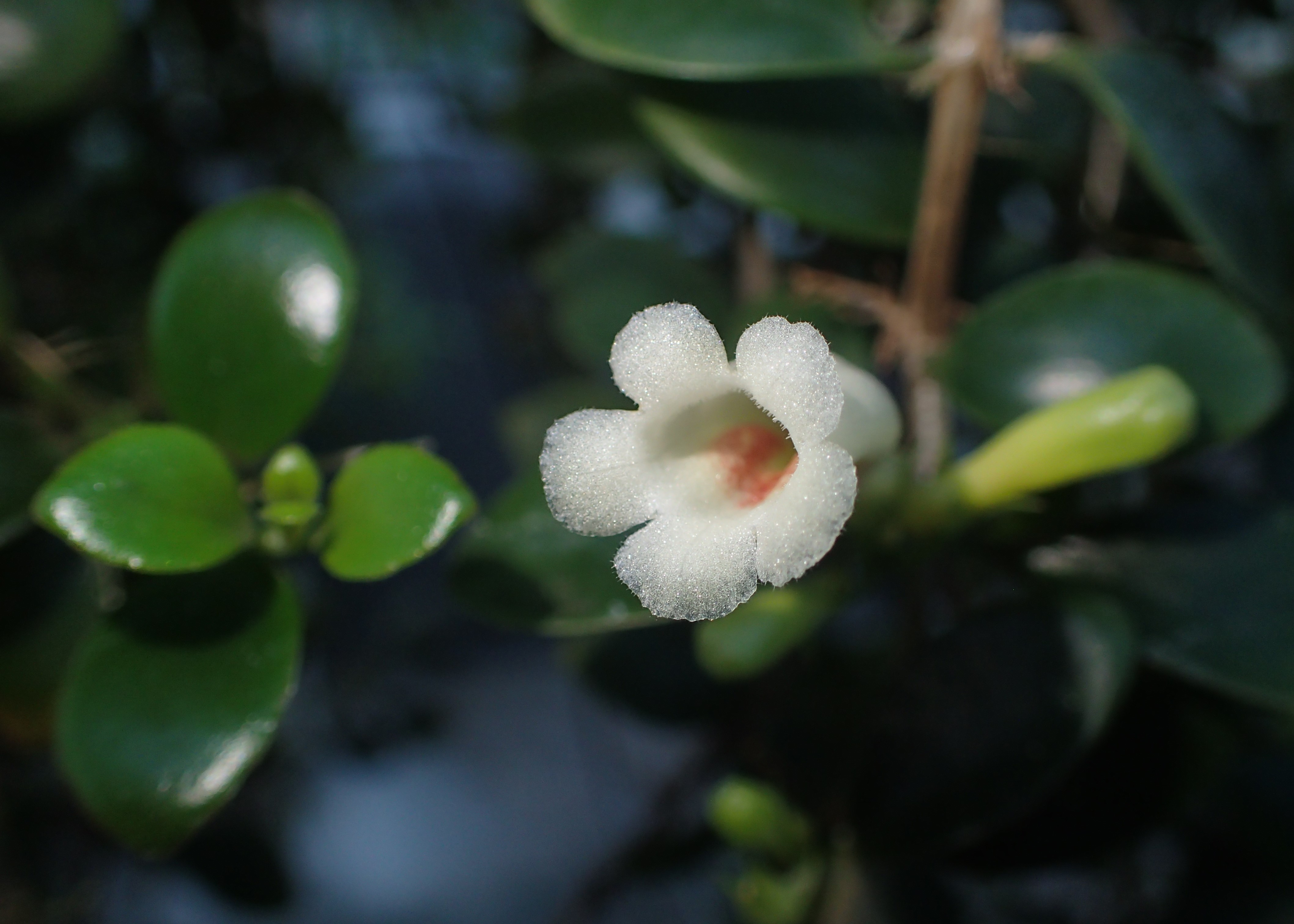
C. macradenia

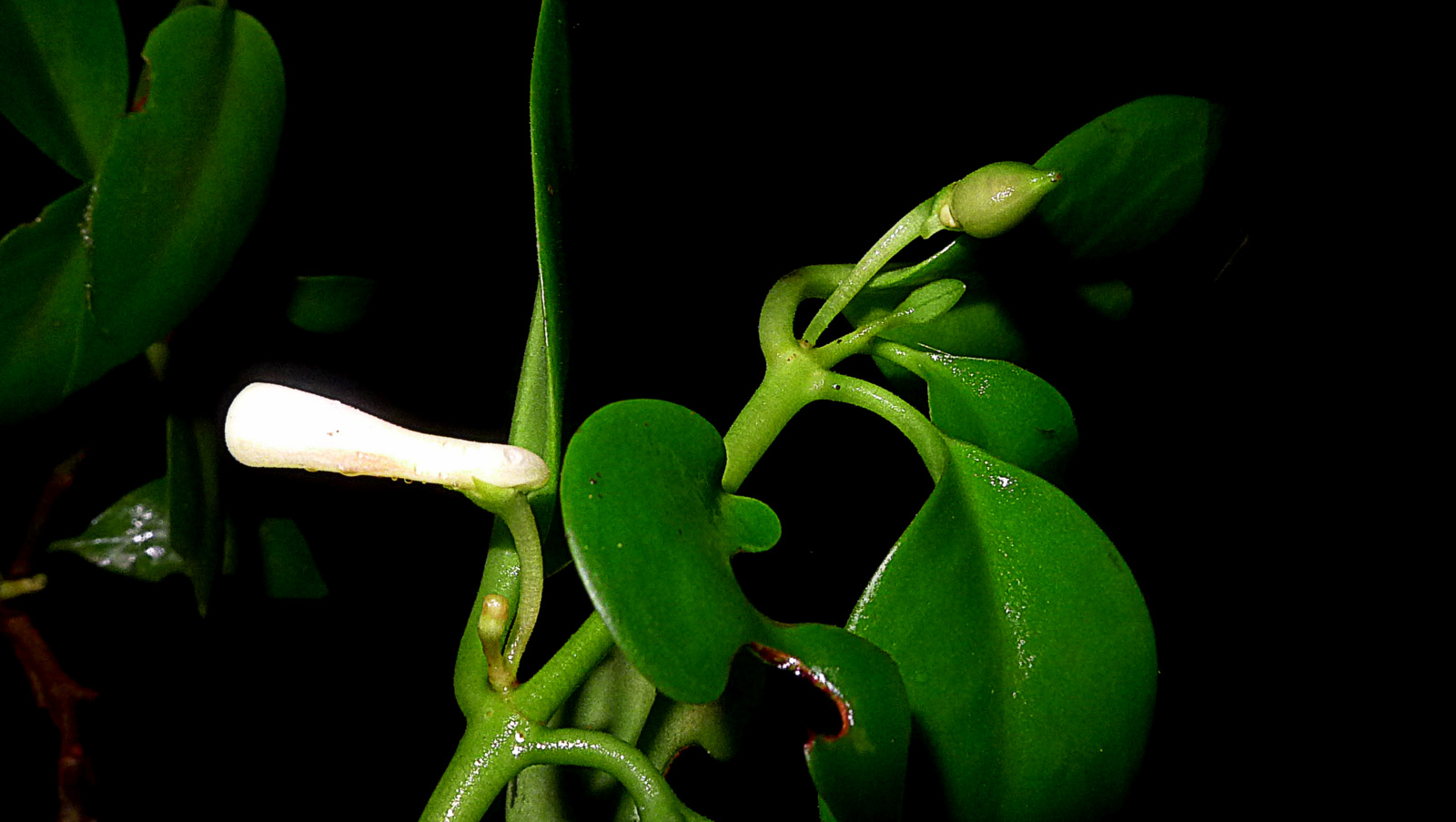
C. uleana

== Distribution and ecology ==
Codonanthopsis species are native from southern Mexico south through Central America and Trinidad and Tobago to Bolivia and all but the very southern part of Brazil. They have a mutually beneficial relationship with arboreal tropical ants. The fibrous roots of the plant support the ants' nests, and the plant provides food for the ants in the form of nectar produced by the flowers and the leaves, as well as the pulp of the fruit and the arils surrounding the seeds. The ants in turn disperse the seeds, which germinate inside their nests. One study in the Brazilian Amazonia found a strong relationship between ants of the genus Azteca and Codonanthopsis species (then placed in the genus Codonanthe). The "ant gardens" produced by this relationship were relatively small, and often interconnected by tunnels. Azteca workers were strongly attracted to Codonanthopsis seeds, which were shown to germinate better when ants had removed the arils.

== Cultivation ==
Codonanthopsis species are cultivated as ornamental houseplants, although less popular than Codonanthe. They can be grown in hanging baskets. A well-drained soilless mix is recommended, and humidity levels over 50% improve flowering and fruiting. They are usually more tolerant of higher temperatures than Codonanthe species. Codonanthopsis elegans has been exhibited at a convention of the Gesneriad Society, and is described as having pale yellow flowers that "contrast beautifully with the dark and shiny foliage".
