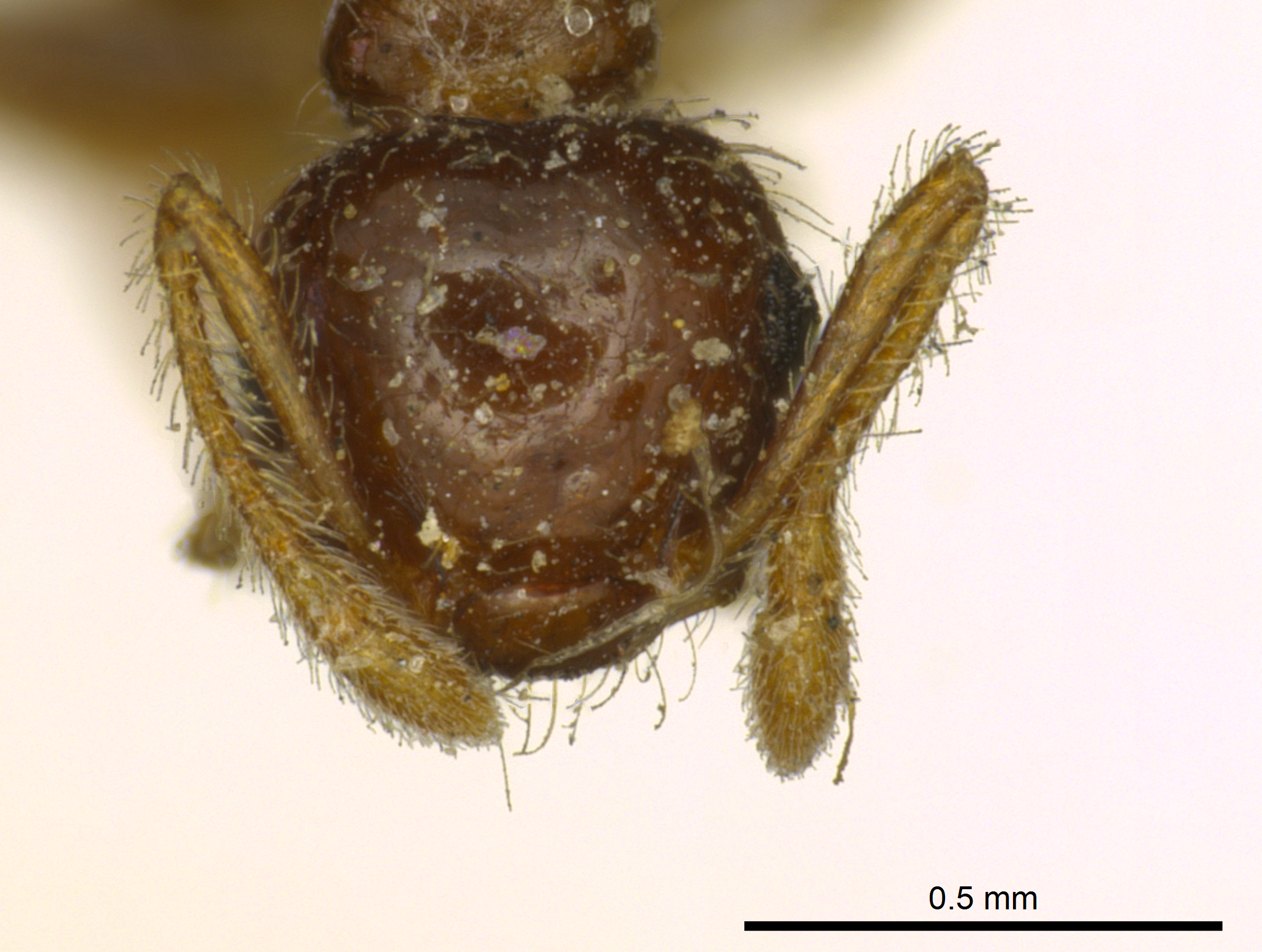

Scientific classification
- Kingdom: Animalia
- Phylum: Arthropoda
- Clade: Pancrustacea
- Class: Insecta
- Order: Hymenoptera
- Family: Formicidae
- Subfamily: Myrmicinae
- Genus: Crematogaster
- Species: C. carinata

Binomial name
- Crematogaster carinata Mayr, 1862

Synonyms
- Crematogaster limata parabiotica Forel

= Crematogaster carinata =

Species of ant

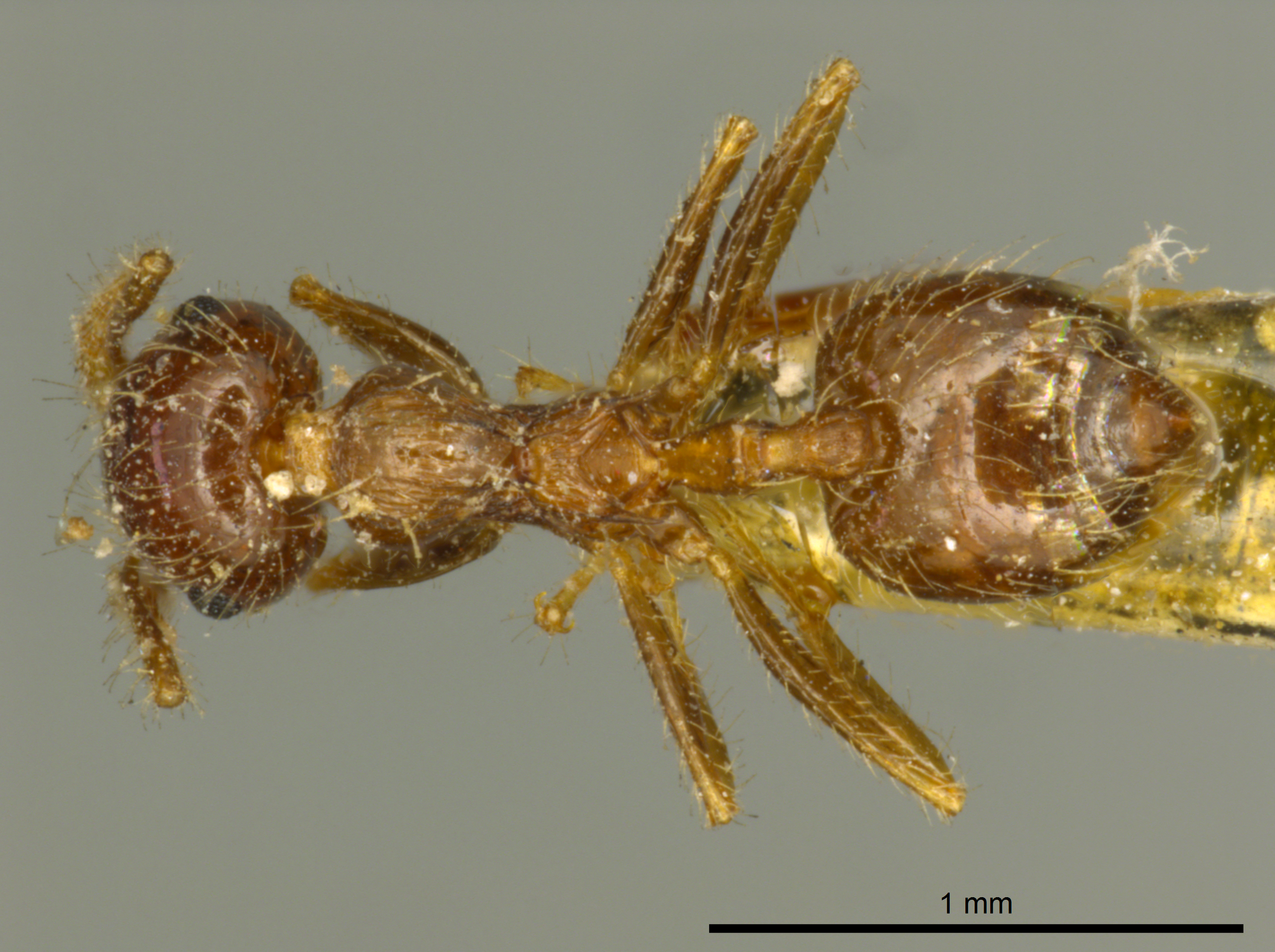
Crematogaster carinata, specimen CASENT0919696, dorsal view

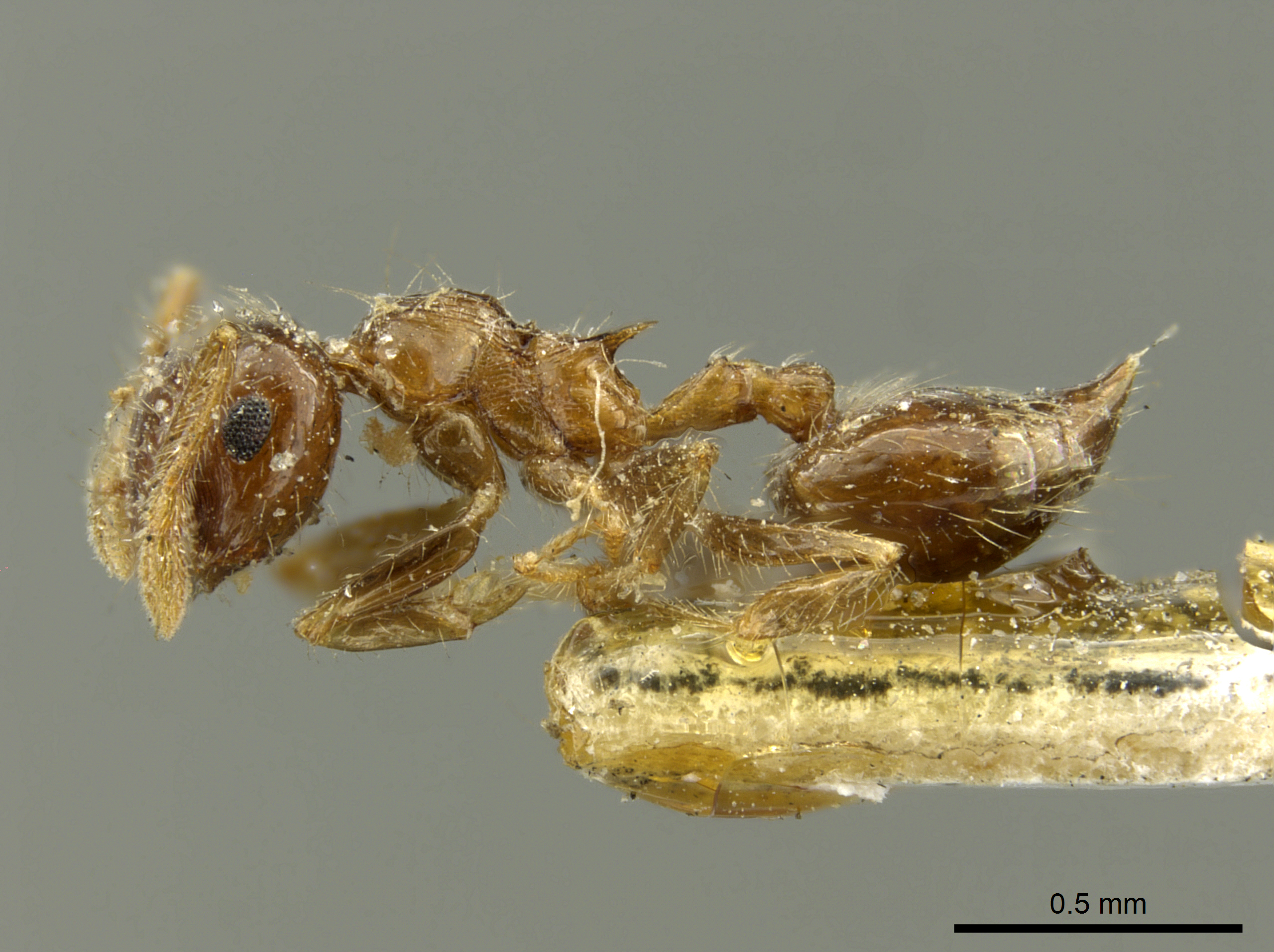
C. carinata, specimen CASENT0919696, profile view

Crematogaster carinata is a species of ant in the tribe Crematogastrini. It was first described by Gustav Mayr in 1862. It is native to Central and South America, where it is a common species, forming large colonies in the canopy of the forest.

== Description ==
Workers of C. carinata are small, and there is only one class. The head, thorax and abdomen are reddish brown, while the mandibles, the tips of the antennae and the tarsi are yellowish.

== Distribution and habitat ==
Crematogaster carinata is native to the Neotropics, its range extending from Costa Rica southward to Bolivia and southern Brazil. It is a widespread species and is found in humid rainforest, and other types of wet lowland forest, at altitudes of up to 2,000 m (6,600 ft).

In a survey of ants in a 0.16 km^{2} (190,000 yd^{2}) of lowland primary rainforest in Ecuador, 489 species of ant were found. C. carinata were the most common species found in the canopy, the electric ant (Wasmannia auropunctata) was the most abundant on the ground while the army ant (Labidus coecus) was the most abundant below ground.

== Ecology ==
Crematogaster carinata is an omnivore, foraging by day and by night for any foodstuff which is available, and making use of any extrafloral nectaries the host tree may provide. The ants are also scavengers, carrying dead and injured insects back to the nest, and feeding on the honeydew produced by scale insects. The ants actively build nests out of a material known as carton, collecting plant fibres or other materials for the purpose, and they also create carton structures to shelter the scale insects from which they get honeydew. Carton material is also used to enclose the roots of epiphytes, but this species is less active in carton construction than are some other species. The enclosed mass of debris and soil from which the epiphytes grow can be anything from the size of a nut to the size of an orange, or larger. It is known as an ant garden and the ants carry seeds of suitable epiphytic species to "plant" in their garden.

In many parts of its range, C. carinata is polygynous, and a single large colony may form in the tree canopy covering a number of large trees. There is not one central nest, instead there are a number of locations where clusters of small nests, each with one or more queens, multiple workers and brood (eggs, larvae and pupae), are to be found. This species forms parabiotic associations with several other species of ant, using the same foraging trails and with the two species sharing nests. Although the two species occupy the same nest, any chamber that contains brood is used exclusively by the ants whose brood it is. In a parabiotic association with Dolichoderus debilis, several nests in a pile of dead branches were adjoining and intermingled with each other, but on the whole, the Crematogaster chambers were small and were near the periphery while the Dolichoderus chambers were larger and more central. Some chambers contained both species, but these housed no brood. When Crematogaster carinata shares a nest with the much fiercer Camponotus femoratus, it may benefit from that ant's aggression. In circumstances where it associates with a larger species of ant, it forms larger and more fully developed ant gardens. In some parts of its range, such as western Costa Rica, it is monogynous, with a single queen in the colony.
