= Ant garden =

Structure formed by ants

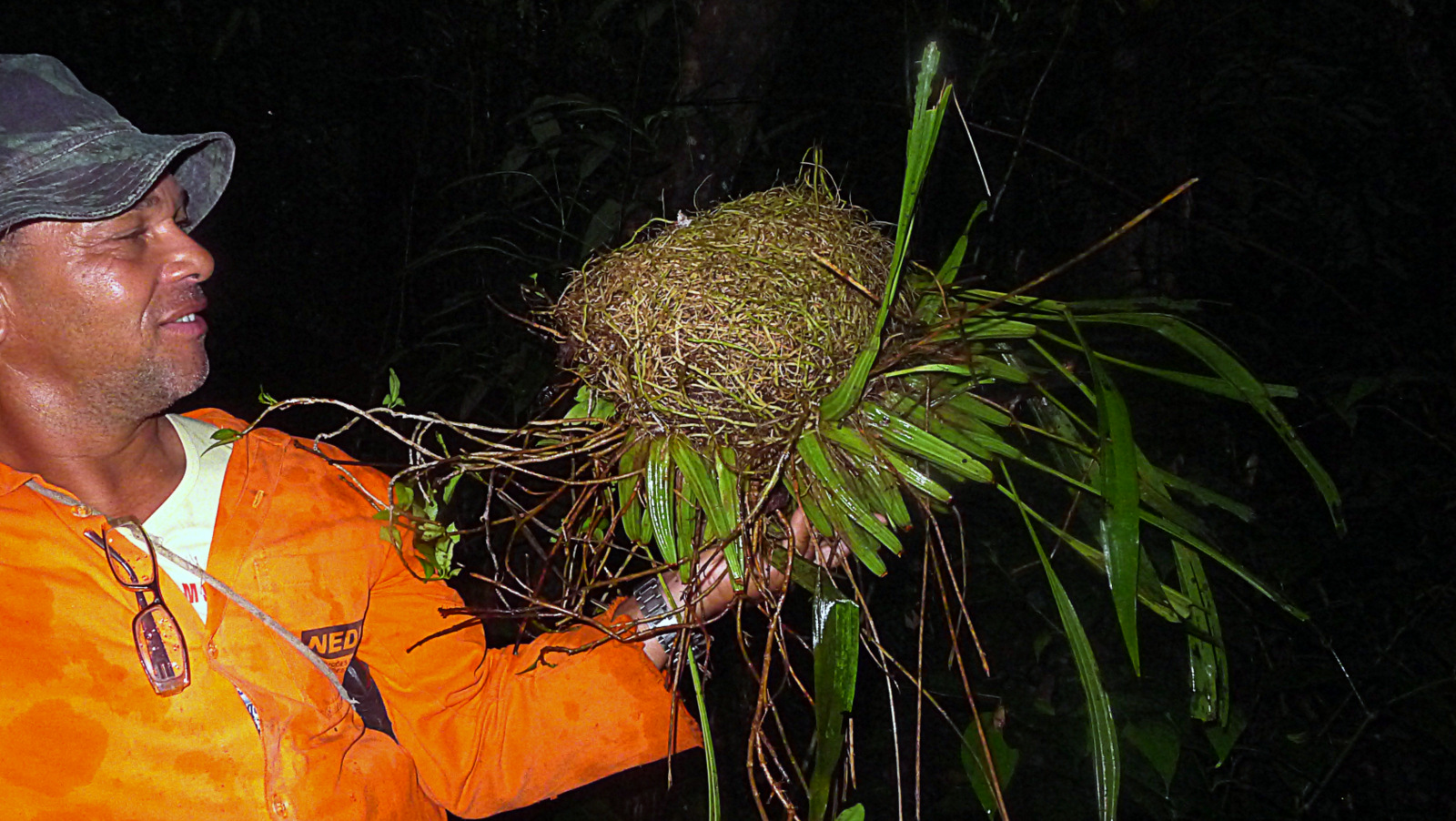
An ant garden

An ant garden is a mutualistic interaction between certain species of arboreal ants and various epiphytic plants. It is a structure made in the tree canopy by the ants that is filled with debris and other organic matter in which epiphytes grow. The ants benefit from this arrangement by having a stable framework on which to build their nest while the plants benefit by obtaining nutrients from the soil and from the moisture retained there.

== Description ==
Epiphytes are common in tropical rain forest and in cloud forest. An epiphyte normally derives its moisture and nutrients from the air, rain, mist and dew. Nitrogenous matter is in short supply and the epiphytes benefit significantly from the nutrients in the ant garden. The ant garden is made from "carton", a mixture of vegetable fibres, leaf debris, refuse, glandular secretions and ant faeces. The ants use this material to build their nests among the branches of the trees, to shelter the hemipteran insects that they tend in order to feed on their honeydew, and to make the pockets of material in which the epiphytes grow.

The ants harvest seeds from the epiphytic plants and deposit them in the carton material. The plants have evolved various traits to encourage ants to disperse their seeds by producing chemical attractants. Eleven unrelated epiphytes that grow in ant gardens have been found to contain methyl salicylate (oil of wintergreen) and it seems likely that this compound is an ant attractant.

== Examples ==
Species of ant that make gardens include Crematogaster carinata, Camponotus femoratus and Solenopsis parabioticus, all of which are parabiotic species which routinely share their nests with unrelated species of ant. Epiphytic plants that they grow include various members of the Araceae, Bromeliaceae, Cactaceae, Gesneriaceae, Moraceae, Piperaceae and Solanaceae. Epiphytic plants in the genus Codonanthopsis, including those formerly placed in Codonanthe, grow almost exclusively in ant gardens, often associated with ants of the genus Azteca. The ant Camponotus irritabilis not only plants the seeds of Hoya elliptica in planned locations on its carton nest but also prunes the roots to accommodate its nest chambers and fertilises the areas where it wants extra plant growth to occur.
