= Goldfish plant =

Goldfish plant is a common name for several plants and may refer to:

- Columnea
- Nematanthus
