= Codonanthopsis ulei =

Scientific classification
- Kingdom: Plantae
- Clade: Tracheophytes
- Clade: Angiosperms
- Clade: Eudicots
- Clade: Asterids
- Order: Lamiales
- Family: Gesneriaceae
- Genus: Codonanthopsis
- Species: C. ulei

Binomial name
- Codonanthopsis ulei Mansf. (1934)

Synonyms
- Codonanthe huebneri Mansf. (1934); Codonanthe mansfeldiana Hoehne (1958)

Species of flowering plant

Codonanthopsis ulei is a species of flowering plant in the family Gesneriaceae. This species is native to tropical South America, ranging from Colombia and southern Venezuela to northern Brazil, Ecuador, and Peru. It is an epiphyte and mainly grows in wet tropical biomes.
