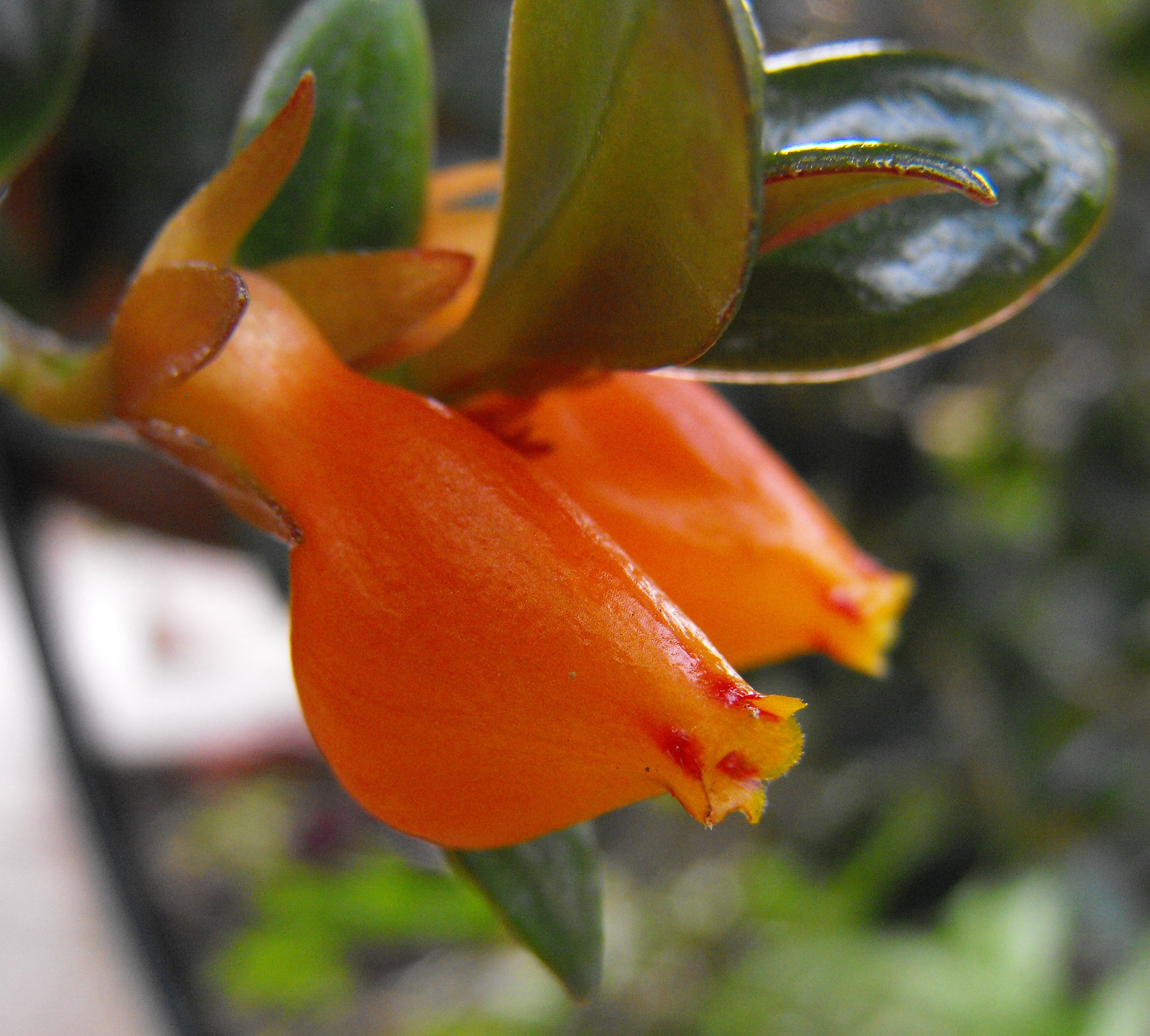
- Nematanthus wettsteinii showing the distinctive "goldfish" flower of some species in the genus

Scientific classification
- Kingdom: Plantae
- Clade: Tracheophytes
- Clade: Angiosperms
- Clade: Eudicots
- Clade: Asterids
- Order: Lamiales
- Family: Gesneriaceae
- Subfamily: Gesnerioideae
- Genus: Nematanthus; Schrad. (1821)

Synonyms
- Hypocyrta Mart. (1829); Orobanchia Vand. (1788)

= Nematanthus =

Genus of epiphytes

Nematanthus is a genus of flowering plants in the family Gesneriaceae. All of its species are endemic to Brazil. Compared to other gesneriads, Nematanthus has leaves that are small, succulent, and hard-surfaced. The plant has a trailing, branching, and spreading habit; it is generally an epiphyte in nature and a hanging-basket plant in cultivation. The flower has fused petals. In some species, the flower has a "pouch" at the bottom. The fancied resemblance of such flowers to a goldfish gives these plants the common name goldfish plant or guppy plant.

Hummingbirds will often feed from the nectar-filled "goldfish" flowers.

== Description ==
Nematanthus species are perennials or subshrubs, typically growing epiphytically, less often in humus-filled pockets on rocks. Their leaves are often reddish underneath. Their flowers have fused petals and vary quite widely in shape. Some have flowers with a "pouch" on the lower surface of the flower and a small opening (particularly those commonly cultivated). Others have flowers that are twisted through 180° when fully open (resupinate), so that if pouched, the pouch is at the top. Resupinate flowers may be brightly coloured, funnel-shaped and compressed from side to side, or white and bell-shaped. Some species have flowers that are borne on long pedicels and hang down below the plant, others have short pedicels so that the flowers are close to the stem.

== Taxonomy ==
The genus Nematanthus was first described by Heinrich Adolph Schrader in 1821, with the only species (and so the type species) being Nematanthus corticola, one of the species with flowers hanging down on long pedicels. The name Nematanthus is from Ancient Greek nema meaning 'thread' and anthos meaning 'flower', referring to the 20 cm (8 in) long pedicels of the type species.

Nematanthus is placed in the subfamily Gesnerioideae, tribe Gesnerieae, subtribe Columneinae. Within the subtribe, it forms a clade with Codonanthe, Codonanthopsis and Lesia:

- - Lesia
  - - Codonanthopsis
    - - Codanthe
      - Nematanthus

=== Species ===
As of April 2021, Plants of the World Online accepted the following species:

- Nematanthus albus Chautems
- Nematanthus australis Chautems
- Nematanthus bradei (Handro) Chautems
- Nematanthus brasiliensis (Vell.) Chautems
- Nematanthus corticola Schrad.
- Nematanthus crassifolius (Schott) Wiehler
- Nematanthus exsertus Chautems
- Nematanthus fissus (Vell.) L.E.Skog
- Nematanthus fluminensis (Vell.) Fritsch
- Nematanthus fornix (Vell.) Chautems
- Nematanthus fritschii Hoehne
- Nematanthus gregarius D.L.Denham
- Nematanthus hirtellus (Schott) Wiehler
- Nematanthus jolyanus (Handro) Chautems
- Nematanthus kautskyi Chautems & Rossini
- Nematanthus kuhlmannii (Handro) Chautems
- Nematanthus lanceolatus (Poir.) Chautems
- Nematanthus maculatus (Fritsch) Wiehler
- Nematanthus mattosianus (Handro) H.E.Moore
- Nematanthus mirabilis (Handro) Chautems
- Nematanthus monanthos (Vell.) Chautems
- Nematanthus punctatus Chautems
- Nematanthus pycnophyllus Chautems, T.Lopes & M.Peixoto
- Nematanthus sericeus (Hanst.) Chautems
- Nematanthus serpens (Vell.) Chautems
- Nematanthus striatus (Handro) Chautems
- Nematanthus strigillosus (Mart.) H.E.Moore
- Nematanthus teixeiranus (Handro) Chautems
- Nematanthus tessmannii (Hoehne) Chautems
- Nematanthus villosus (Hanst.) Wiehler
- Nematanthus wettsteinii (Fritsch) H.E.Moore
- Nematanthus wiehleri Chautems & M.Peixoto
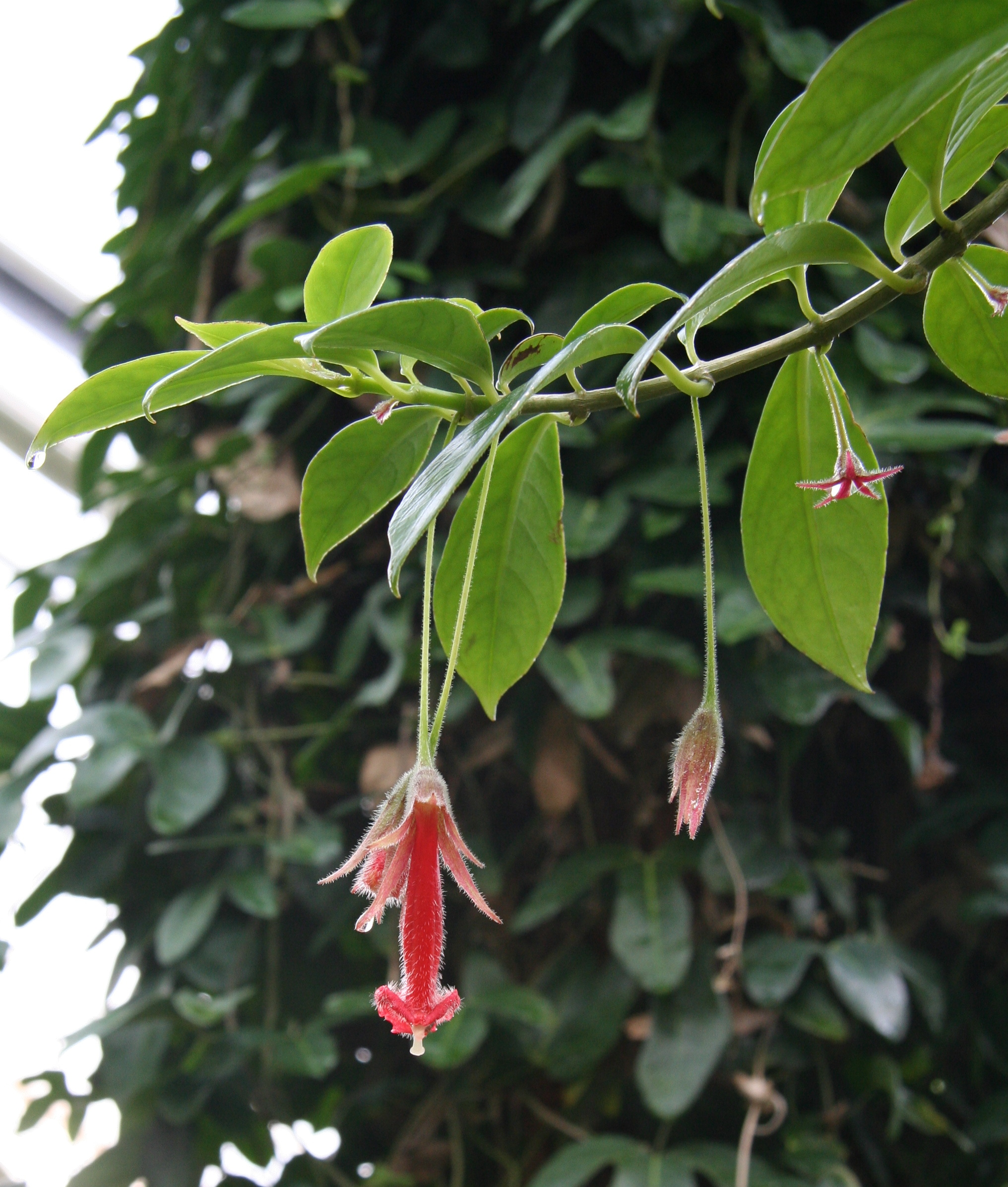
N. crassifolius

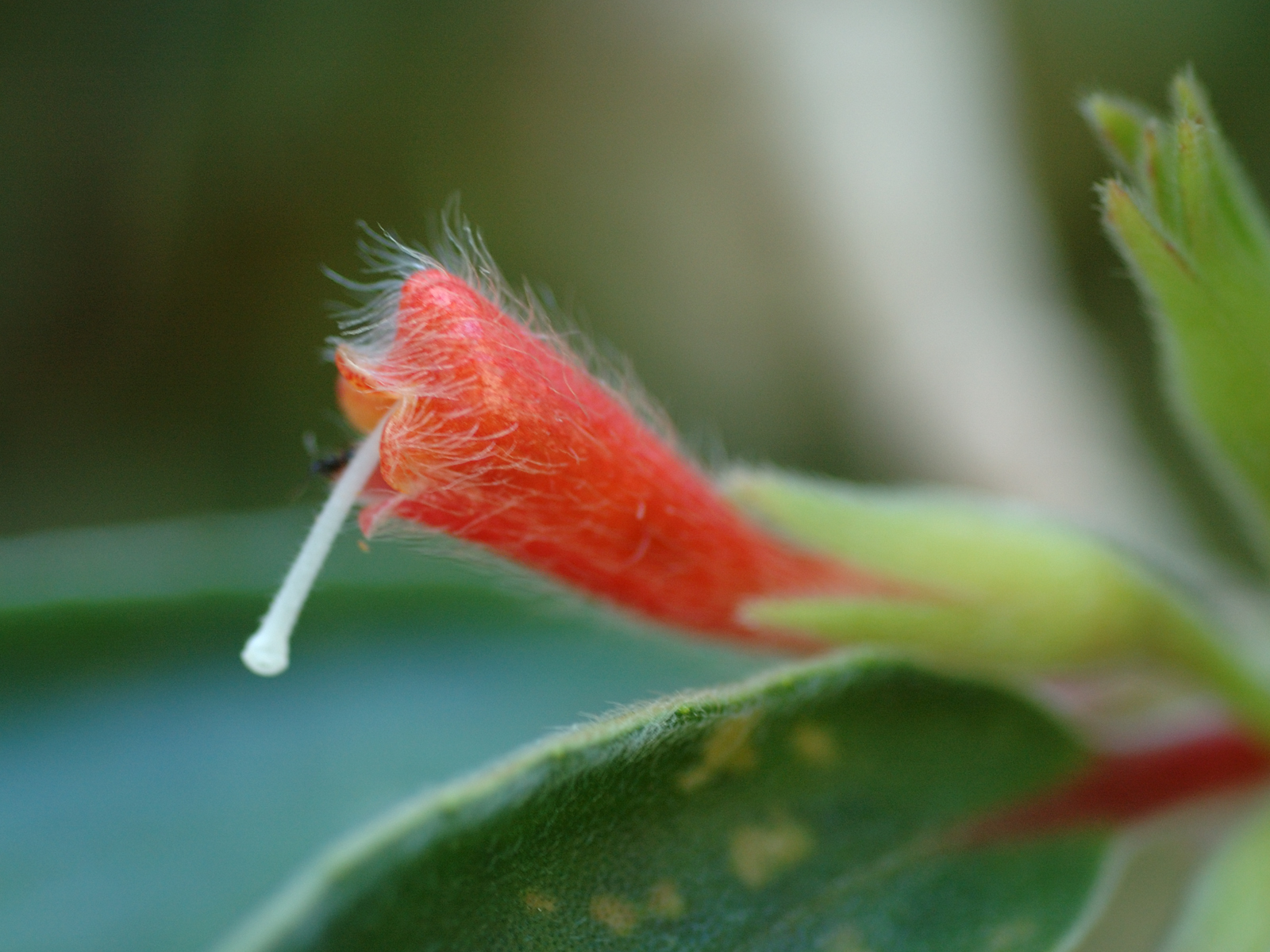
N. fissus

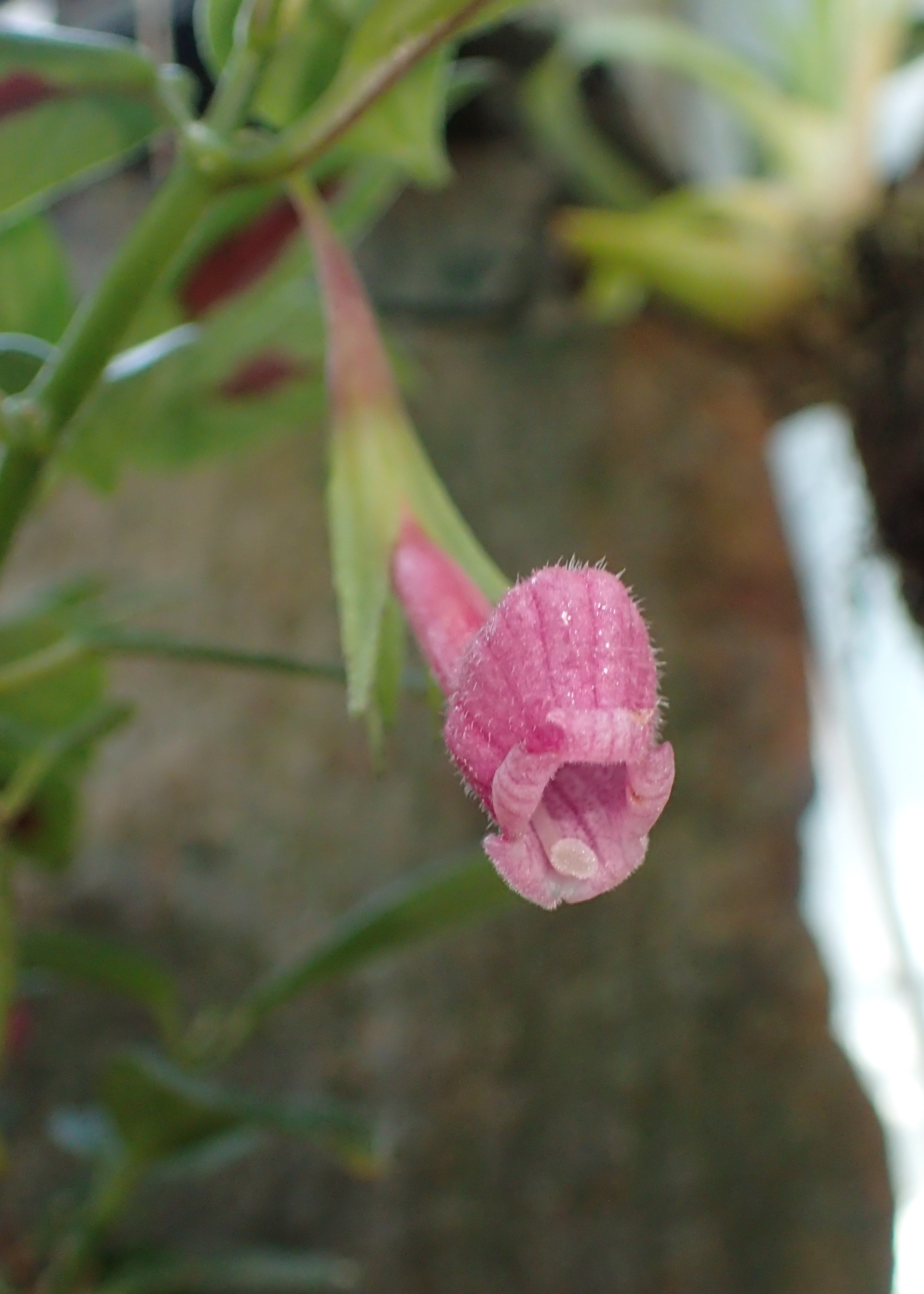
N. fritschii

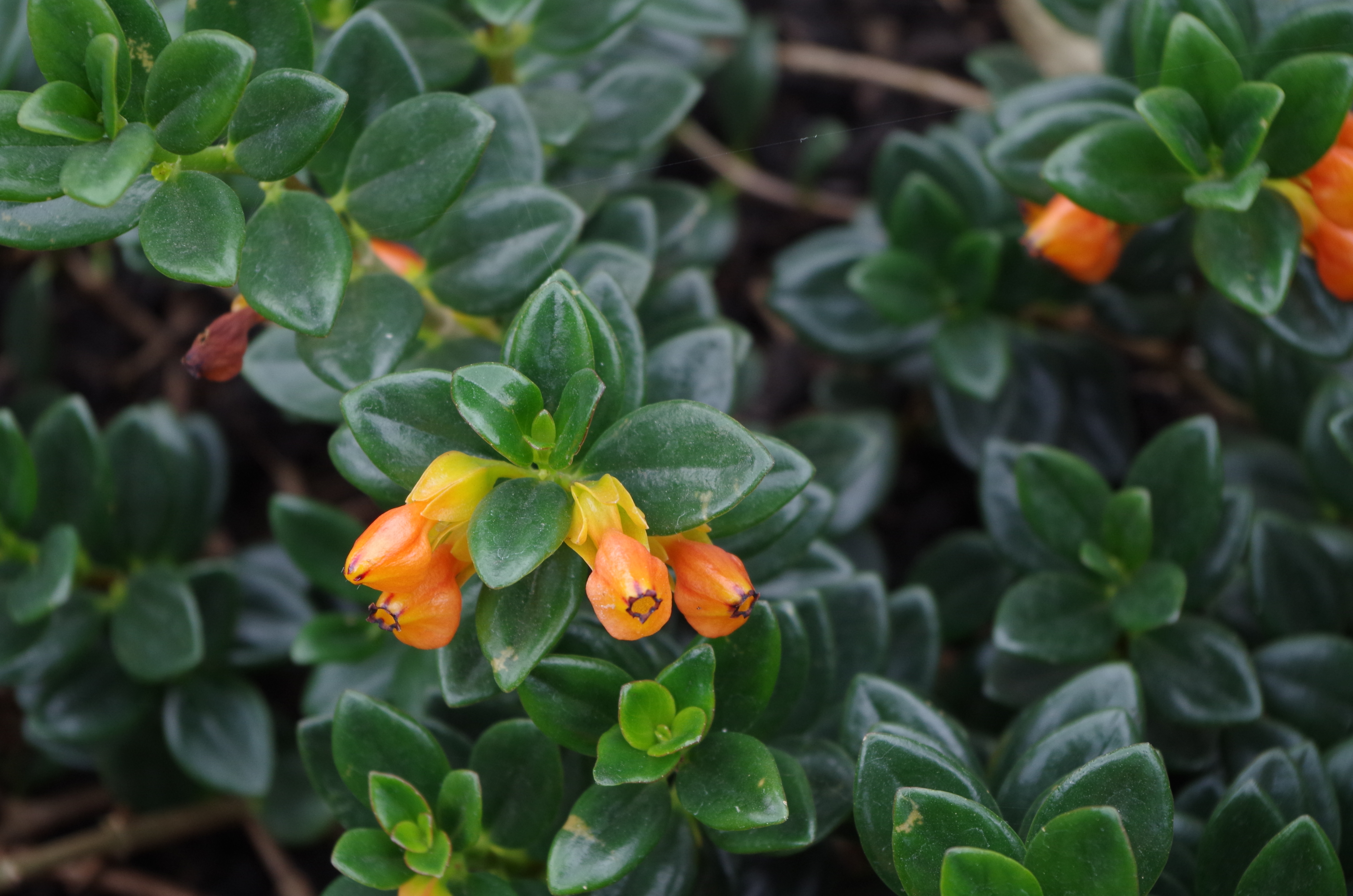
N. gregarius

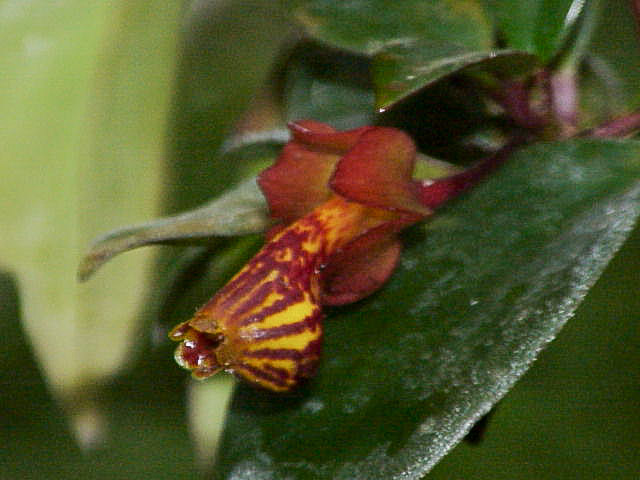
N. strigillosus

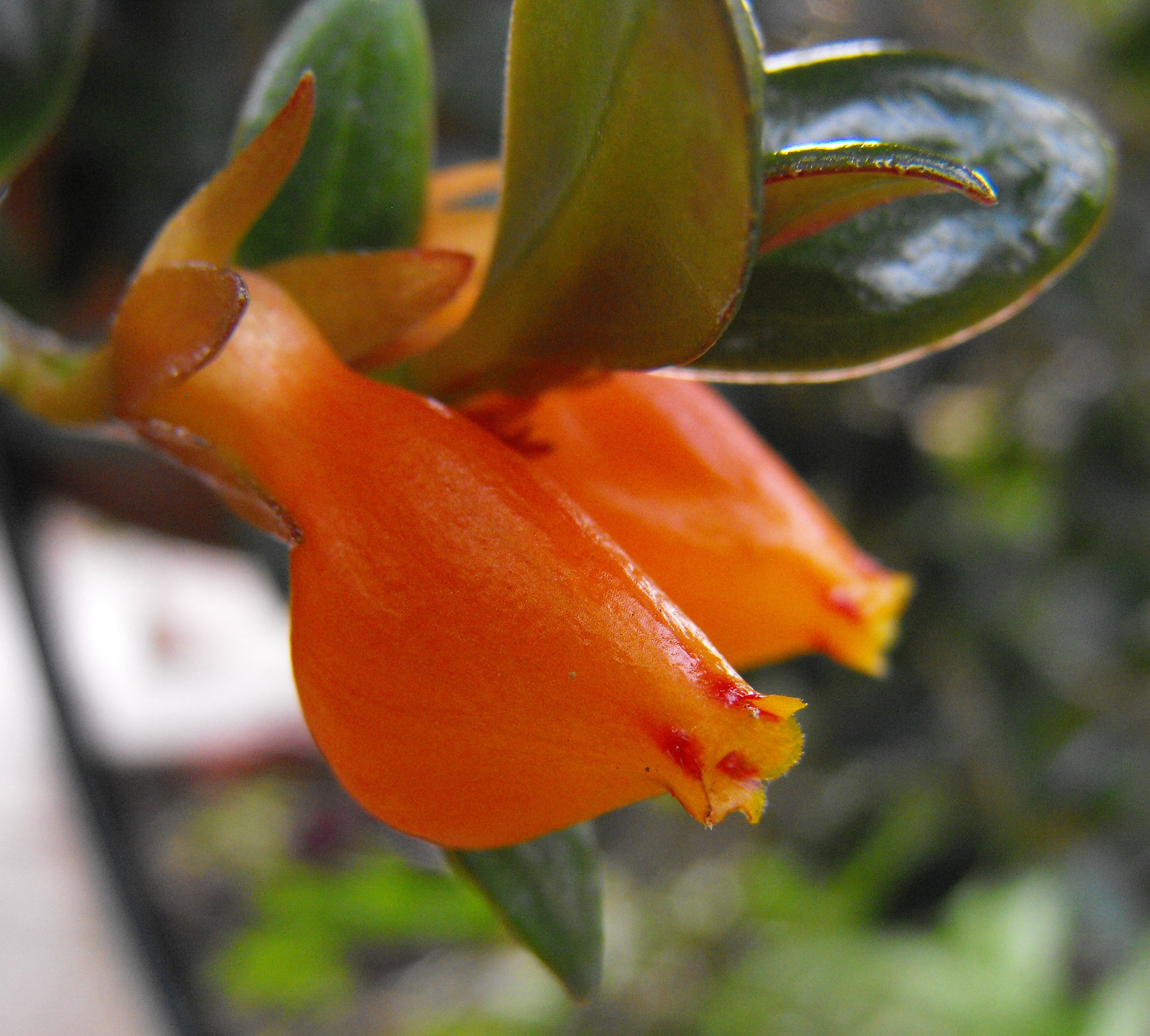
N. wettsteinii

== Cultivation ==
Nematanthus thrive at temperatures between 18 and 25 °C (64 and 77 °F), although they stay more compact if grown at 15 to 17 °C (59 to 63 °F). They may lose their leaves if temperatures go above this level. Nematanthus gregarius is said to tolerate temperatures down to −1 to 2 °C (30 to 35 °F). Nematanthus do best in bright indirect light, and can easily burn in direct sunlight. They prefer high humidity, and grow better under these conditions, but adapt to household humidity. The tuberous roots of this plant retain water, and Nematanthus prefer the soil to remain moist, and well-drained. The goldfish plant enjoys being pot-bound, and is more likely to bloom in that state. When grown in the right conditions, Nematanthus is known to bloom year-round. To encourage new blooms, regular pruning of the plant is recommended. Plants can be propagated from cuttings.

=== Cultivars ===
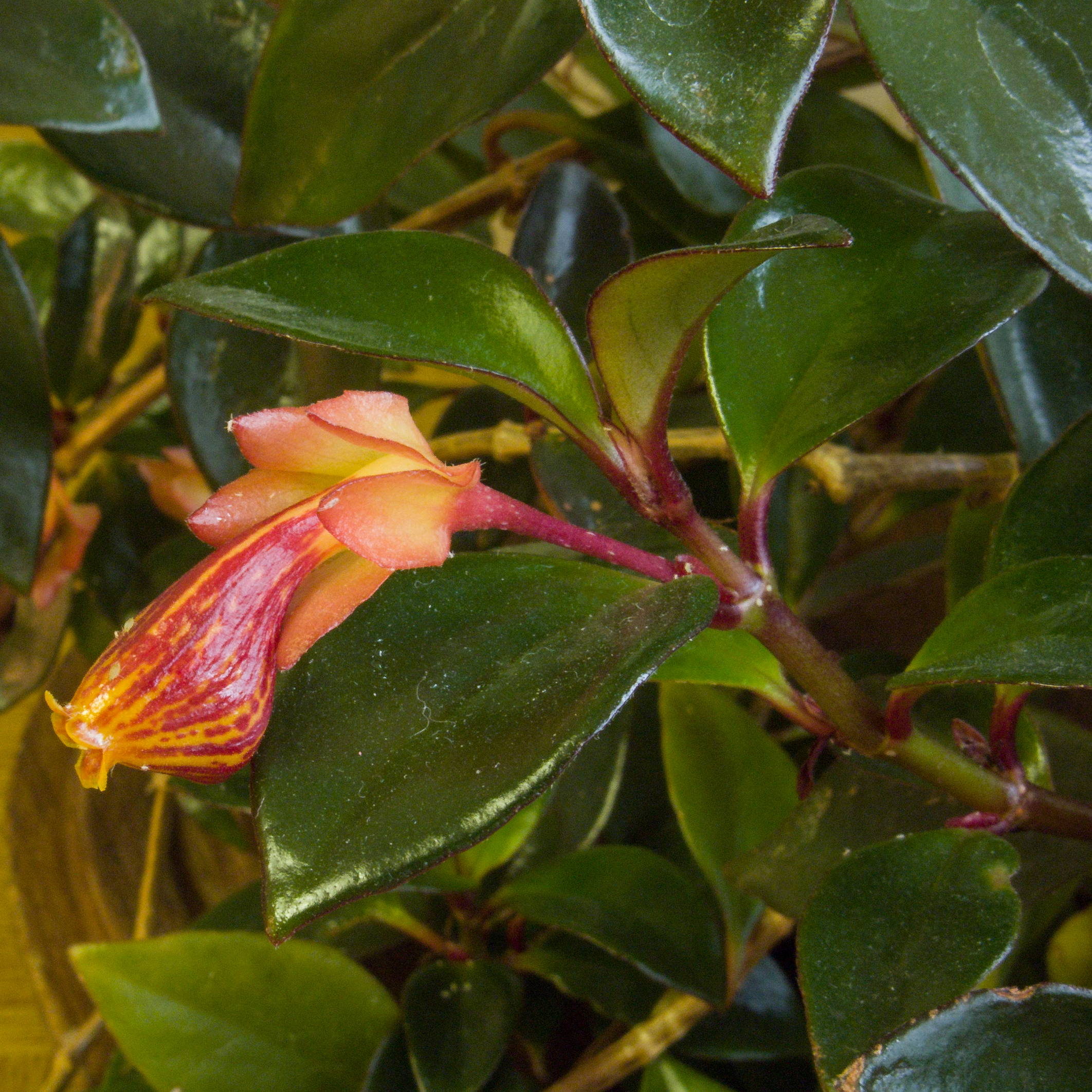
Nematanthus 'Tropicana'

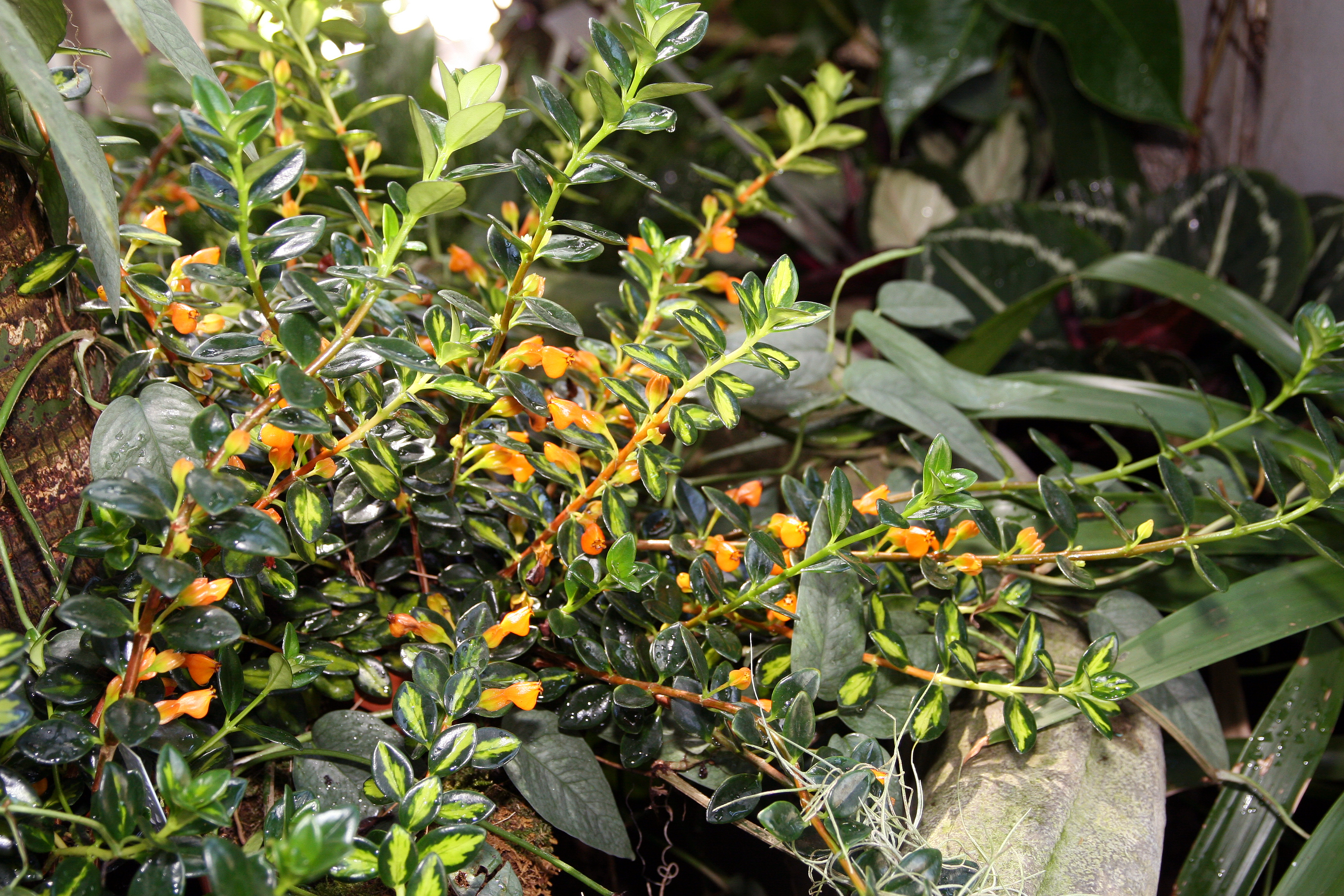
Nematanthus gregarius 'Dibley's Gold'

'Tropicana' originated from a cross made in the United States by W. R. Saylor. The parents were reported to be N. perianthomegus and N. gregarius. As of April 2021, N. perianthomegus was treated as a synonym of N. hirtellus by Plants of the World Online, although other sources say that it is a synonym of N. tessmannii. 'Tropicana' is initially upright, after which older branches trail. The leaves are 5 by 2.5 cm (2.0 by 1.0 in), glossy dark green with a reddish brown margin on the under surface. The flower has a red-brown calyx, the fused petals (perianth) being yellow with red-brown stripes and spots. 'Tropicana' produces flower buds all year round.

'Rio' also originated from a cross by Saylor, in this case between N. gregarius and N. fissus (syn. Hypocyrta selloana). Its leaves are slightly larger than those of 'Tropicana', 6 by 6 cm (2.4 by 2.4 in), lighter green on both sides and less glossy. The flower is smaller, with a light green calyx and a striking orange-red perianth. 'Rio' makes buds all year round.

'Herens' is of unknown origin. It resembles 'Tropicana', with a somewhat smaller leaf, 4.5 by 2 cm (1.8 by 0.8 in), with a reddish tinge on the underside. The calyx is red-green and the perianth orange-red. It can flower abundantly all year round.

'Gietvoz' is also of unknown origin. It is a compact cultivar, less sensitive to unfavorable growing conditions such as overwatering or bright light. The leaf is smaller, 3.5 by 2 cm (1.4 by 0.8 in), and less tapered than that of other cultivars, and is thick, waxy and glossy. The underside of the leaf is red with a green edge and is clearly visible as the leaves are somewhat upright. The flower has an inconspicuous light green calyx and an orange-yellow perianth. Although 'Gietvoz' does not flower as readily as other cultivars, it has a good growth habit and attractive foliage.

Saylor also made crosses between Codonanthe gracilis and Nematanthus hybrids, creating the hybrid genus × Codonatanthus. Two of the resulting cultivars are 'Fiesta' and 'Aurora'.

Nematanthus gregarius 'Dibley's Gold' has variegated leaves.

== Toxicity ==
Nematanthus is considered non-toxic and safe for pets by the ASPCA.
