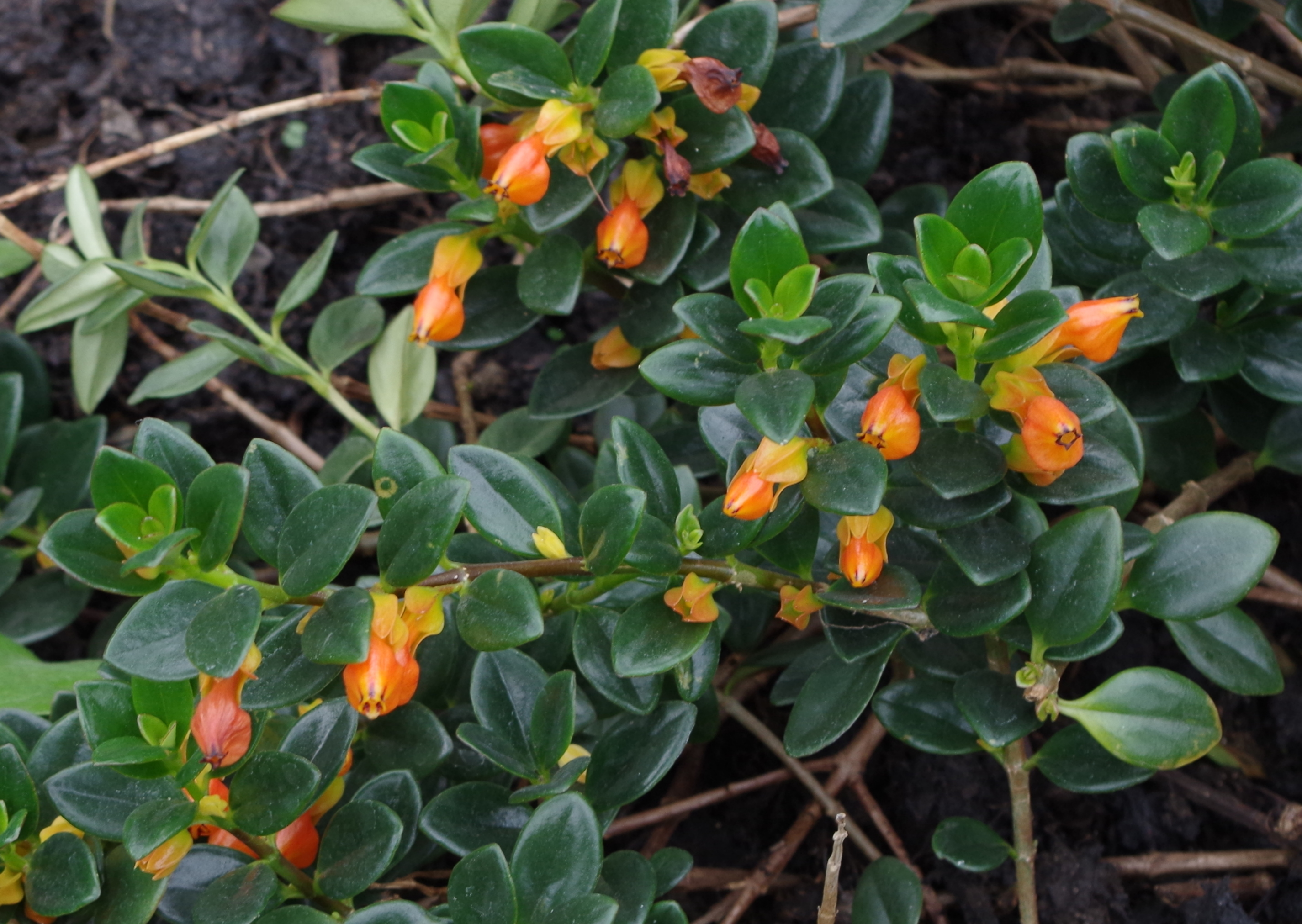

Scientific classification
- Kingdom: Plantae
- Clade: Tracheophytes
- Clade: Angiosperms
- Clade: Eudicots
- Clade: Asterids
- Order: Lamiales
- Family: Gesneriaceae
- Genus: Nematanthus
- Species: N. gregarius

Binomial name
- Nematanthus gregarius D.L.Denham

= Nematanthus gregarius =

Species of flowering plant

Nematanthus gregarius, also called the clog plant or goldfish plant, is a species of flowering plant from Brazil in the gesneriad family, Gesneriaceae, making it a relative of such genera as Streptocarpus (African violets) and Aeschynanthus (lipstick plants).

== Description ==
Growing to 0.5 m (1.6 ft) tall by 1 m (3.3 ft) broad, in its native habitat, N. gregarius is an epiphytic (tree-climbing) perennial subshrub with small and fleshy, usually waxy and shiny, dark green leaves, with brilliant-orange, tubular flowers appearing in the summer. The flowers vaguely resemble clogs or rotund goldfish in shape and color, hence the common names; some gardeners have nicknamed it the "guppy plant", as well as "garibaldi plant" or "garibaldi flower" due to its resemblance of the marine fish species Hypsypops rubicundus, the California garibaldi.

Nematanthus gregarius reproduces sexually and spreads by producing small orange colored fruits.

== Cultivation ==
As it does not tolerate temperatures below 10 °C (50 °F), in temperate zones, this plant requires the protection of glass, greenhouses, or must be kept as a houseplant during the colder months, preferably near a bright southern window, but not placed directly in full sunlight for extended periods as the foliage may burn. It is often kept permanently as a houseplant, in hanging baskets which highlight its trailing habit. In appropriate environments, such as Florida, Hawaii, or Southern California, N. gregarius may be seen in outdoor gardening and landscaping projects. This plant is readily propagated and reproduced commercially via vegetative reproduction.

Nematanthus gregarius has received the Royal Horticultural Society's Award of Garden Merit.

== Gallery ==
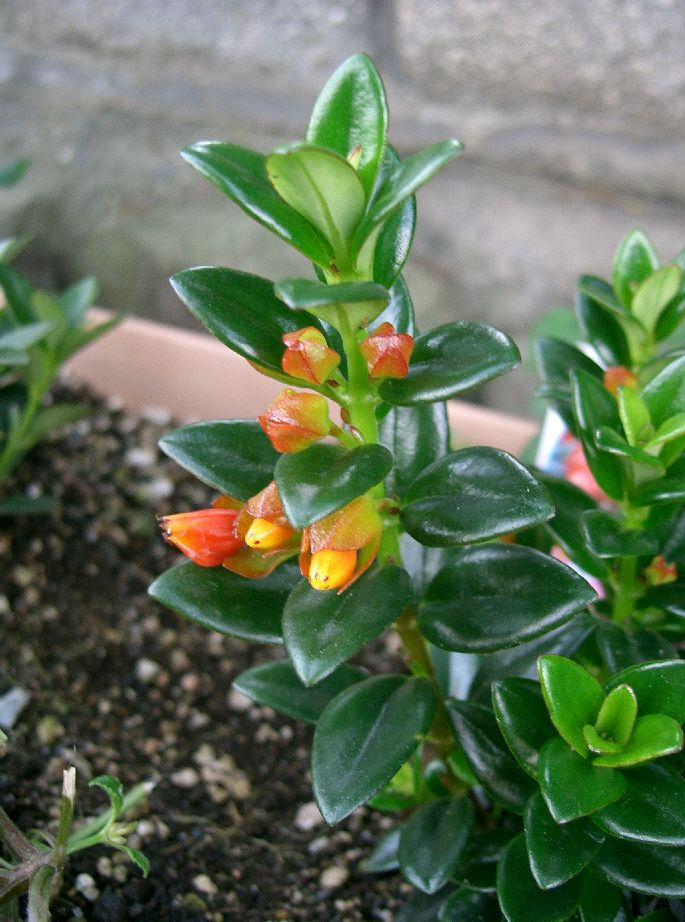

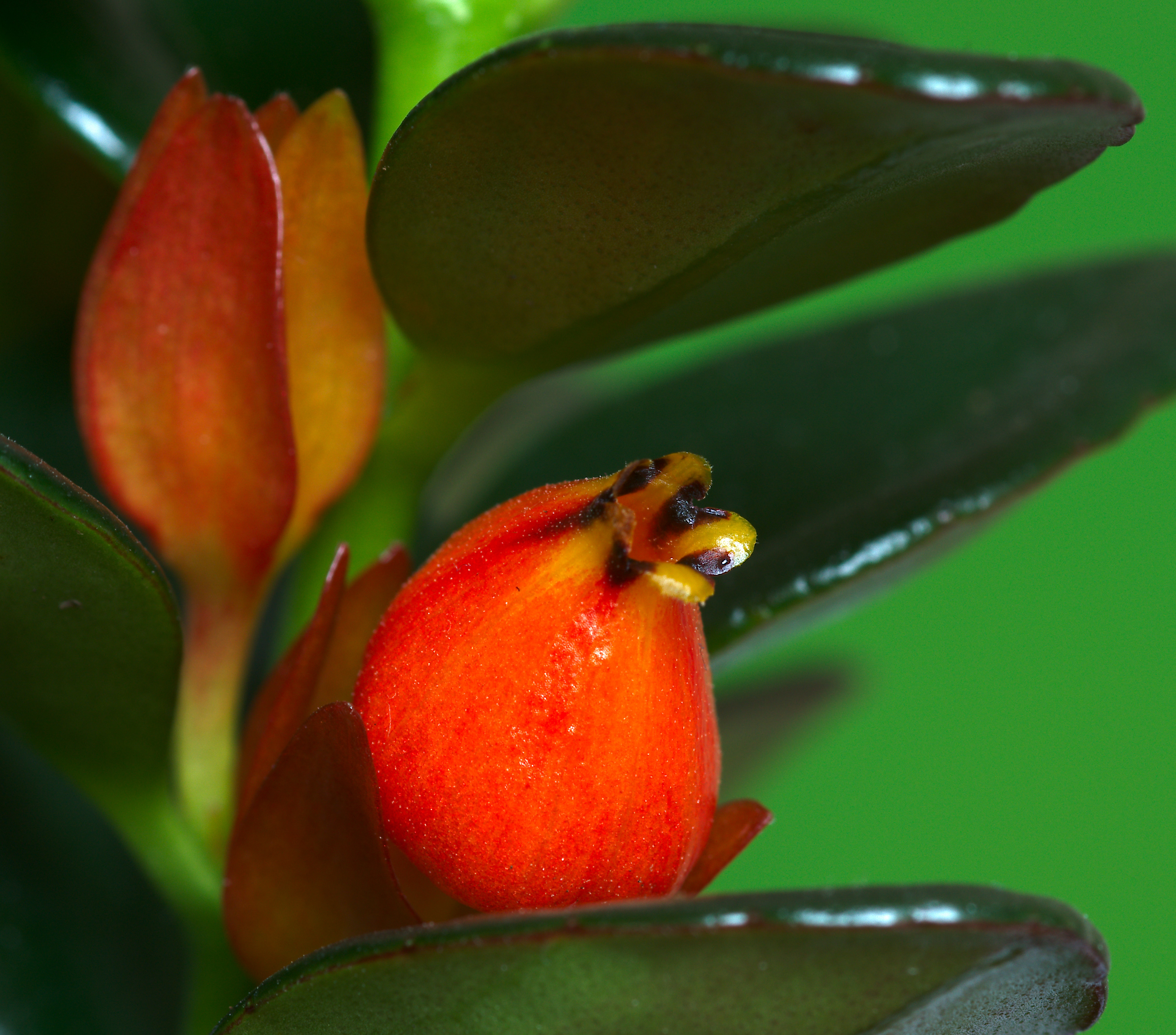
