= Codonanthopsis caribaea =

Scientific classification
- Kingdom: Plantae
- Clade: Tracheophytes
- Clade: Angiosperms
- Clade: Eudicots
- Clade: Asterids
- Order: Lamiales
- Family: Gesneriaceae
- Genus: Codonanthopsis
- Species: C. caribaea

Binomial name
- Codonanthopsis caribaea (Urb.) Chautems & Mat.Perret (2013)

Synonyms
- Codonanthe caribaea Urb. (1901); Codonanthe eggersii Urb. (1901); Codonanthe triplinervia Britton (1921); Codonanthe triplinervia var. latifolia C.V.Morton (1954); Codonanthe triplinervia var. purpurea C.V.Morton (1954)

Species of flowering plant

Codonanthopsis caribaea is a species of flowering plant in the family Gesneriaceae. This species is native to Guadeloupe to North Venezuela, and is a epiphyte and mainly grows in wet tropical biomes. Codonanthopsis caribaea, along with other species in its genus, was first published in 2013.
