= Codonanthopsis dissimulata =

Scientific classification
- Kingdom: Plantae
- Clade: Tracheophytes
- Clade: Angiosperms
- Clade: Eudicots
- Clade: Asterids
- Order: Lamiales
- Family: Gesneriaceae
- Genus: Codonanthopsis
- Species: C. dissimulata

Binomial name
- Codonanthopsis dissimulata (H.E.Moore) Wiehler

Synonyms
- Homotypic Synonyms: Codonanthe dissimulata H.E.Moore; Heterotypic Synonyms: Codonanthe dissimulata H.E.Moore

Species of flowering plant

Codonanthopsis dissimulata is a species of flowering plant in the family Gesneriaceae. It is an epiphyte that grows in wet tropical biomes and is native to northern Brazil, Colombia, Ecuador, French Guiana, Guyana, Peru, and Venezuela. It was first formally described in 1978.

== Uses ==
It has been recorded as being used in Ecudor and Columbia as a traditional medicine to treat toothaches, headaches and ant stings.
