= Codonanthopsis erubescens =

Scientific classification
- Kingdom: Plantae
- Clade: Tracheophytes
- Clade: Angiosperms
- Clade: Eudicots
- Clade: Asterids
- Order: Lamiales
- Family: Gesneriaceae
- Genus: Codonanthopsis
- Species: C. erubescens

Binomial name
- Codonanthopsis erubescens (Wiehler) Chautems & Mat.Perret (2013)

Synonyms
- Codonanthe erubescens Wiehler (1992)

Species of plant

Codonanthopsis erubescens is a species of flowering plant in the family Gesneriaceae. This species is native to Ecuador and mainly grows in wet tropical biomes. Codonanthopsis erubescens was first published in 2013.
