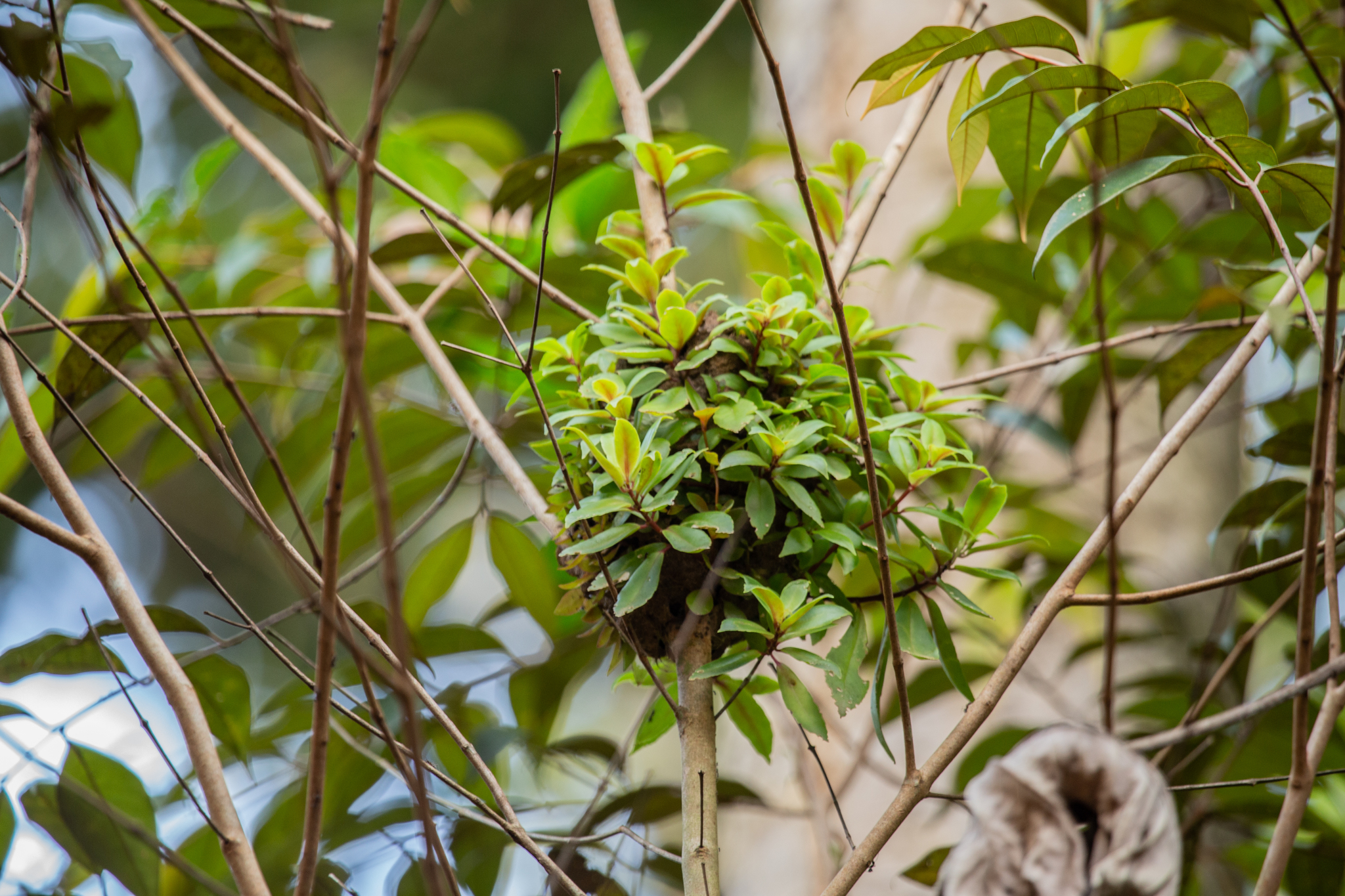
- In Suriname

Scientific classification
- Kingdom: Plantae
- Clade: Tracheophytes
- Clade: Angiosperms
- Clade: Eudicots
- Clade: Asterids
- Order: Lamiales
- Family: Gesneriaceae
- Genus: Codonanthopsis
- Species: C. calcarata

Binomial name
- Codonanthopsis calcarata (Miq.) Chautems & Mat.Perret (2013)

Synonyms
- Codonanthe calcarata (Miq.) Hanst. in Linnaea 34: 416 (1866); Nematanthus calcaratus Miq. in Linnaea 22: 472 (1849); Codonanthe bipartita L.B.Sm. in Bull. Torrey Bot. Club 60: 657 (1933)

= Codonanthopsis calcarata =

Species of plant

Codonanthopsis calcarata is a species of flowering plant in the family Gesneriaceae. This species is native to Bolivia, Brazil North, Brazil West-Central, Colombia, French Guiana, Guyana, Suriname, and Venezuela. Codonanthopsis calcarata is an epiphyte, and mainly grows in wet tropical biomes. Codonanthopsis calcarata was first published in 2013.
