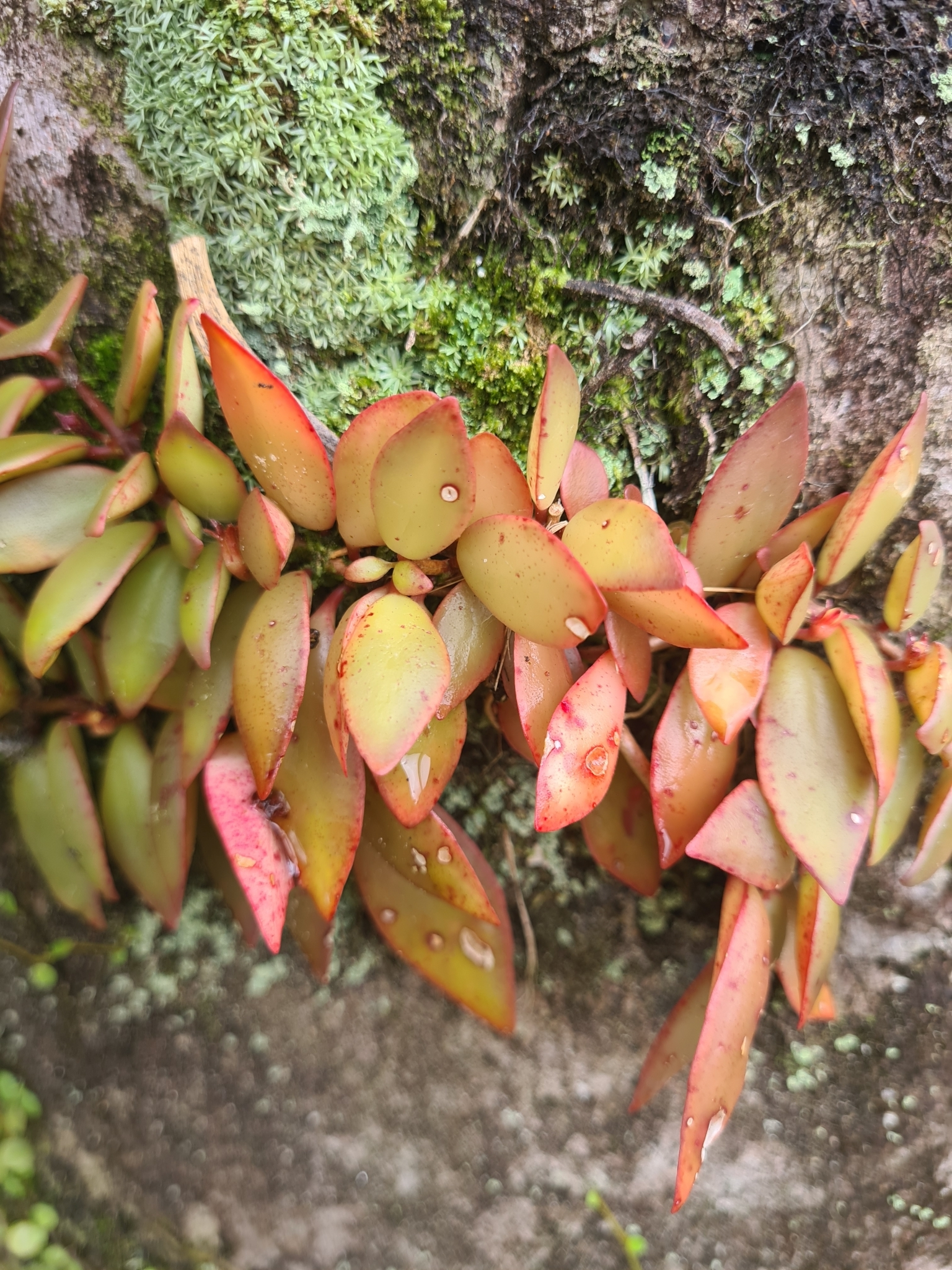

Scientific classification
- Kingdom: Plantae
- Clade: Tracheophytes
- Clade: Angiosperms
- Clade: Eudicots
- Clade: Asterids
- Order: Lamiales
- Family: Gesneriaceae
- Genus: Codonanthopsis
- Species: C. crassifolia

Binomial name
- Codonanthopsis crassifolia (H.Focke) Chautems & Mat.Perret

= Codonanthopsis crassifolia =

Species of plant

Codonanthopsis crassifolia is a species of plant in the family Gesneriaceae.
