= Codonanthopsis luteola =

Scientific classification
- Kingdom: Plantae
- Clade: Tracheophytes
- Clade: Angiosperms
- Clade: Eudicots
- Clade: Asterids
- Order: Lamiales
- Family: Gesneriaceae
- Genus: Codonanthopsis
- Species: C. luteola

Binomial name
- Codonanthopsis luteola (Wiehler) Chautems & Mat.Perret (2013)

Synonyms
- Codonanthe luteola Wiehler (1975)

Species of plant

Codonanthopsis luteola is a species of flowering plant in the family Gesneriaceae. This species is native to Panamá and mainly grows in wet subtropical biomes. Codonanthopsis luteola was first published in 2013.
