= Codonanthopsis anisophylla =

Scientific classification
- Kingdom: Plantae
- Clade: Tracheophytes
- Clade: Angiosperms
- Clade: Eudicots
- Clade: Asterids
- Order: Lamiales
- Family: Gesneriaceae
- Genus: Codonanthopsis
- Species: C. anisophylla

Binomial name
- Codonanthopsis anisophylla (Feuillet & L.E.Skog) Chautems & Mat.Perret (2013)

Synonyms
- Paradrymonia anisophylla Feuillet & L.E.Skog (2002 publ. 2003)

Species of flowering plant

Codonanthopsis anisophylla is a species of flowering plant in the family Gesneriaceae. This species is native in Guyana and mainly grows in wet tropical biomes. The species was first described in the genus Paradrymonia from a specimen collected in 1960, and transferred to Codonanthopsis in 2013.

It is an epiphytic subshrub.
