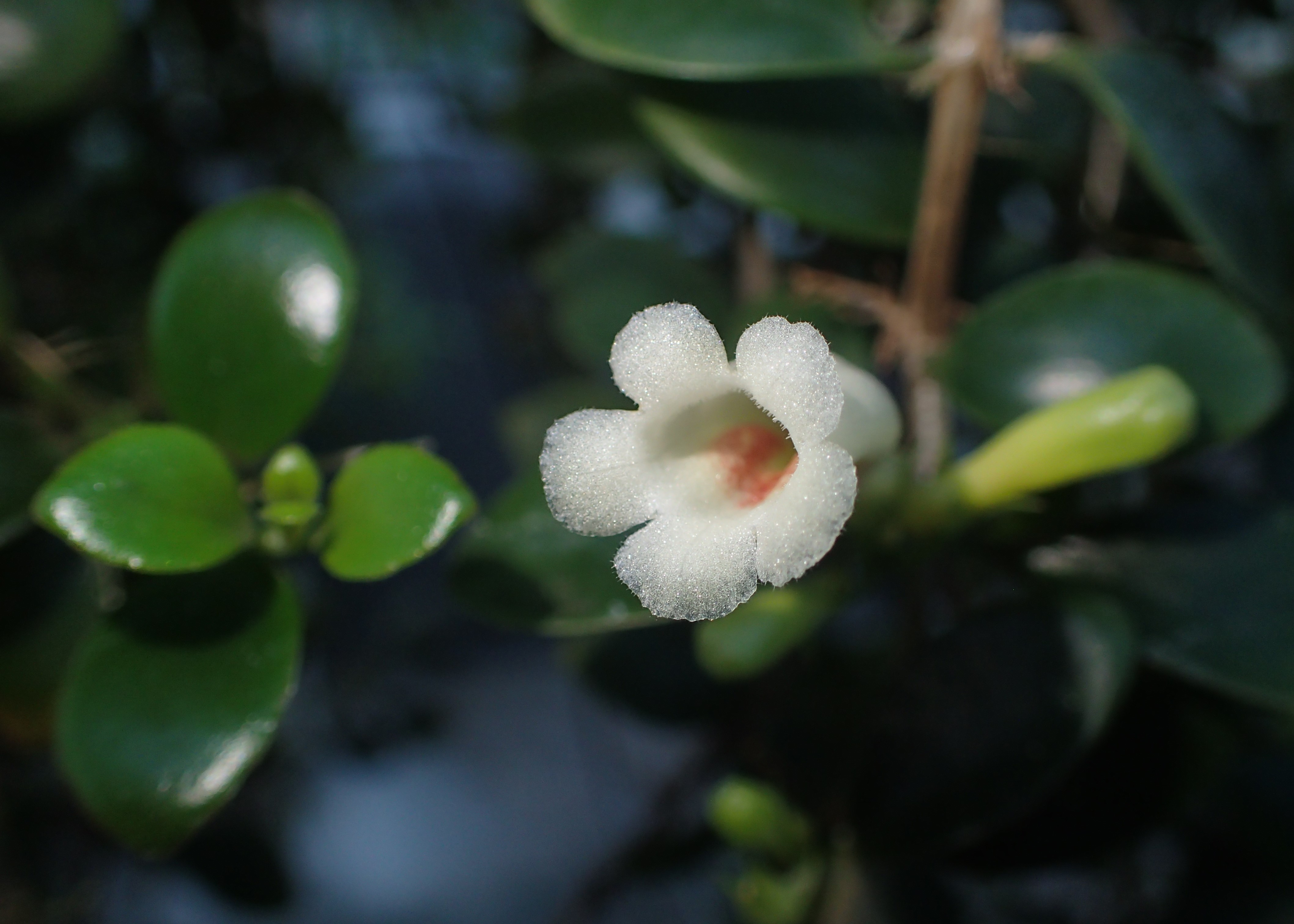

Scientific classification
- Kingdom: Plantae
- Clade: Tracheophytes
- Clade: Angiosperms
- Clade: Eudicots
- Clade: Asterids
- Order: Lamiales
- Family: Gesneriaceae
- Genus: Codonanthopsis
- Species: C. macradenia

Binomial name
- Codonanthopsis macradenia (Donn.Sm.) Chautems & Mat.Perret (2013)

Synonyms
- Codonanthe macradenia Donn.Sm. (1898)

= Codonanthopsis macradenia =

Species of flowering plant

Codonanthopsis macradenia is a species of flowering plant in the family Gesneriaceae. This species is native to Belize, Colombia, Costa Rica, Guatemala, Honduras, Mexico, and Panamá, and mainly grows in subtropical biomes. Codonanthopsis macradenia was first published in 2013.
