= Codonanthopsis corniculata =

Scientific classification
- Kingdom: Plantae
- Clade: Tracheophytes
- Clade: Angiosperms
- Clade: Eudicots
- Clade: Asterids
- Order: Lamiales
- Family: Gesneriaceae
- Genus: Codonanthopsis
- Species: C. corniculata

Binomial name
- Codonanthopsis corniculata (Wiehler) Chautems & Mat.Perret (2013)

Synonyms
- Codonanthe corniculata Wiehler (1977)

Species of flowering plant

Codonanthopsis corniculata is a species of flowering plant in the family Gesneriaceae. This species is native to Peru and mainly grows in wet tropical biomes. The species was first described as Codonanthe corniculata by Hans Wiehler in 1977. In 2013 it was placed in genus Codonanthopsis as Codonanthopsis corniculata.
