= Codonanthopsis chiricana =

Scientific classification
- Kingdom: Plantae
- Clade: Tracheophytes
- Clade: Angiosperms
- Clade: Eudicots
- Clade: Asterids
- Order: Lamiales
- Family: Gesneriaceae
- Genus: Codonanthopsis
- Species: C. chiricana

Binomial name
- Codonanthopsis chiricana (Wiehler) Chautems & Mat.Perret (2013)

Synonyms
- Codonanthe chiricana Wiehler (1977)

Species of flowering plant

Codonanthopsis chiricana is a species of flowering plant in the family Gesneriaceae. This species is native to Panama and mainly grows in wet tropical biomes. Codonanthopsis chiricana was first published in 2013.
