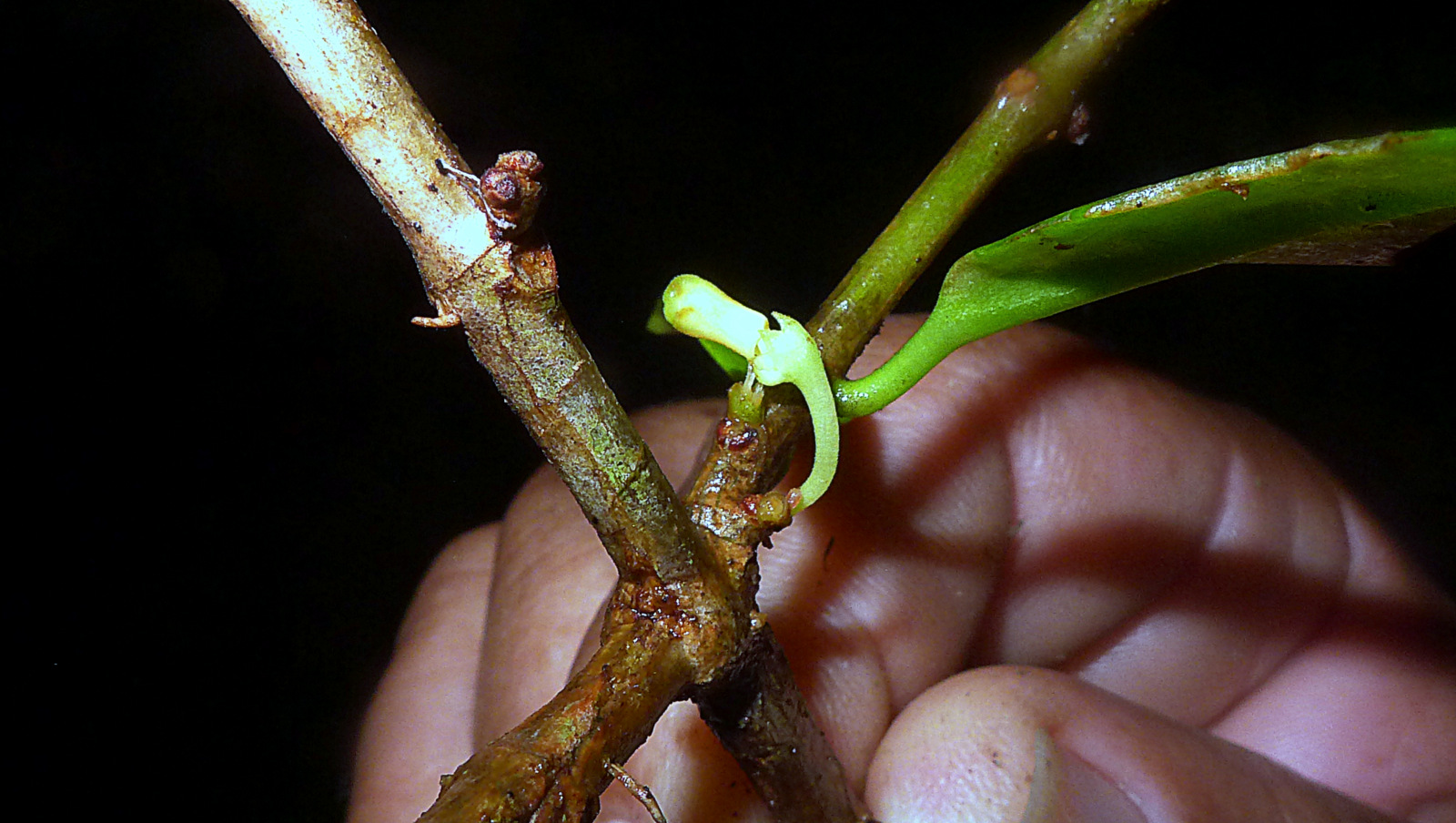
- Codonanthopsis uleana (Fritsch) Chautems & Mat. Perret

Scientific classification
- Kingdom: Plantae
- Clade: Embryophytes
- Clade: Tracheophytes
- Clade: Spermatophytes
- Clade: Angiosperms
- Clade: Eudicots
- Clade: Asterids
- Order: Lamiales
- Family: Gesneriaceae
- Genus: Codonanthopsis
- Species: C. uleana

Binomial name
- Codonanthopsis uleana (Fritsch) Chautems & Mat.Perret (2013)

Synonyms
- Codonanthe decurrens I.M.Johnst. (1949); Codonanthe formicarum Fritsch (1905); Codonanthe uleana Fritsch (1905); Codonanthe uleana var. integrifolia Fritsch (1906); Columnea calcarata Donn.Sm. (1902)

= Codonanthopsis uleana =

Species of flowering plant

Codonanthopsis uleana is a species of flowering plant in the family Gesneriaceae. This species is native to Mexico and America. Is an epiphyte and mainly grows in wet tropical biomes.

The species was first described as Codonanthe uleana in 1905 by Karl Fritsch. In 2013 it was placed in the genus Codonanthopsis as Codonanthopsis uleana.
