= Codonanthopsis elegans =

Scientific classification
- Kingdom: Plantae
- Clade: Tracheophytes
- Clade: Angiosperms
- Clade: Eudicots
- Clade: Asterids
- Order: Lamiales
- Family: Gesneriaceae
- Genus: Codonanthopsis
- Species: C. elegans

Binomial name
- Codonanthopsis elegans (Wiehler) Chautems & Mat.Perret (2013)

Synonyms
- Codonanthe elegans Wiehler (1984)

Species of flowering plant

Codonanthopsis elegans is a plant species in the family Gesneriaceae. It is endemic to Belize.
