= Dolichoderus debilis =

Scientific classification
- Domain: Eukaryota
- Kingdom: Animalia
- Phylum: Arthropoda
- Class: Insecta
- Order: Hymenoptera
- Family: Formicidae
- Subfamily: Dolichoderinae
- Genus: Dolichoderus
- Species: D. debilis

Binomial name
- Dolichoderus debilis Emery, 1890

Synonyms
- Dolichoderus debilis parabiotica Forel, 1912; Dolichoderus debilis sieversi Forel, 1901

Species of ant

Dolichoderus debilis is a species of ant in the genus Dolichoderus. Described by Emery in 1890, the species is found in many countries in two continents, including Bolivia, Brazil, Colombia, Costa Rica, French Guiana, Guatemala, Guyana, Panama, Suriname, Trinidad and Tobago and Venezuela.
