= Parabiosis =

Laboratory technique to study physiology

Parabiosis is a laboratory technique used in physiological research, derived from the Greek word meaning "living beside." The technique involves the surgical joining of two living organisms in such a way that they develop a single, shared physiological system. Through this approach, researchers can study the exchange of blood, hormones, and other substances between the two organisms, allowing for the examination of a wide range of physiological phenomena and interactions. Parabiosis has been employed in various fields of study, including stem cell research, endocrinology, aging research, and immunology.

Heterochronic parabiosis involves parabiosis of animals of different ages; this allows researchers to study how circulating blood-borne factors influence aging and tissue regeneration. The method has led to insights into stem cell function, neurogenesis, regeneration (biology), and aging. In contrast, isochronic parabiosis joins two animals of the same age.

== Parabiotic experiments ==
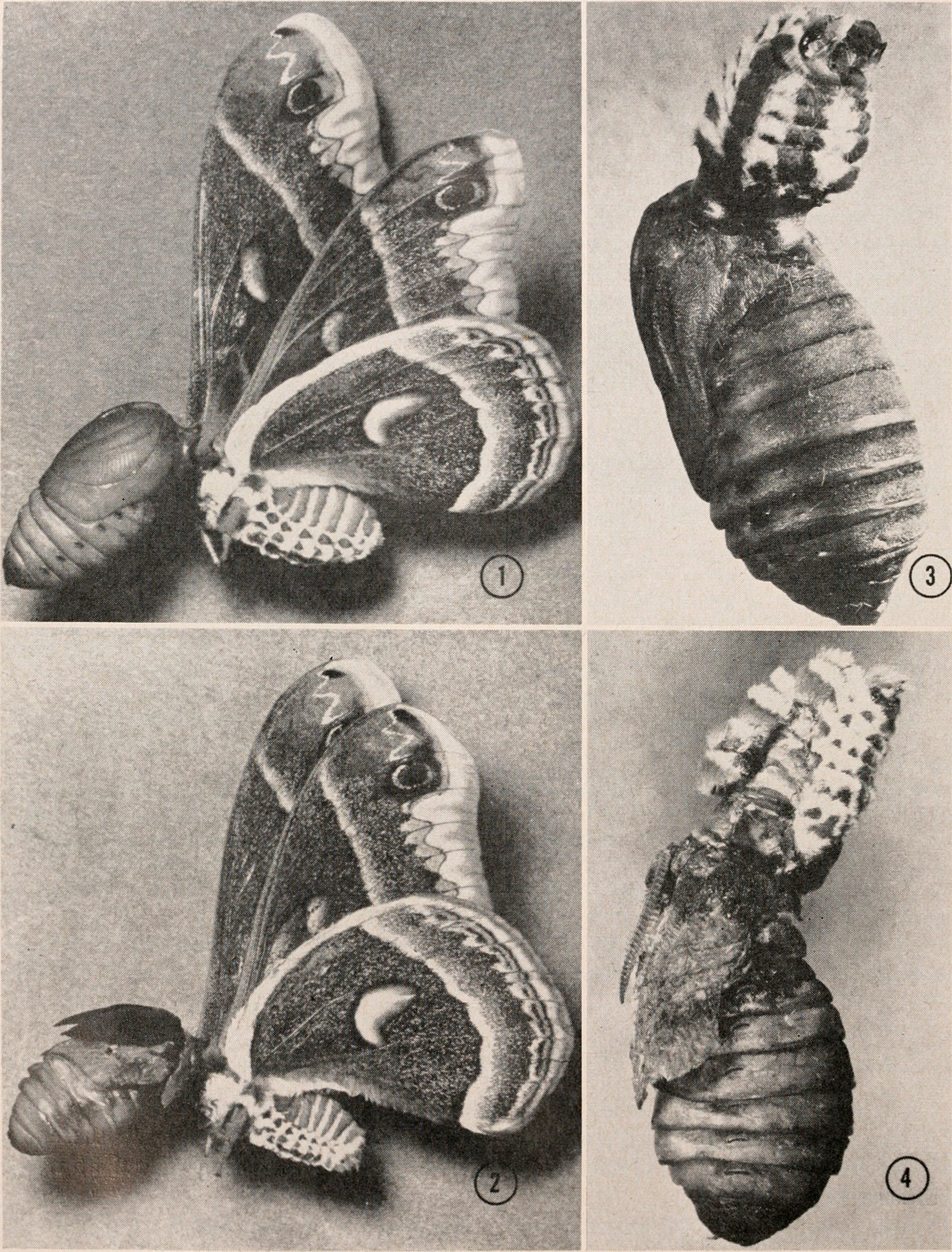
Left: A headless Cecropia Moth joined with a pupa of the Polyphemus silkworm. Right: The abdomen of a Cecropia moth joined with a Cecropia pupa

Parabiosis combines two living organisms which are joined surgically and develop single, shared physiological systems. Researchers can prove that the feedback system in one animal is circulated and affects the second animal via blood and plasma exchange.

Parabiotic experiments were pioneered by Paul Bert in the mid-1800s. He postulated that surgically connected animals could share a circulatory system. Bert was awarded the Prize of Experimental Physiology of the French Academy of Science in 1866 for his discoveries.

One limitation of the experiments is that outbred rats cannot be used because it can lead to a significant loss of pairs due to "disharmony" or "intoxication" of the blood supply due to one rat's immune system attacking the other rat's body as foreign. In other words, there is a lack of histocompatibility, much like in cases of rejected organ transplants.

== Examples ==
=== Discovery of leptin and the role of the hypothalamus in obesity ===
Many of the parabiotic experiments since 1950 involve research regarding metabolism. One of these experiments was published in 1959 by G. R. Hervey in the Journal of Physiology. This experiment supported the theory that damage to the hypothalamus, particularly the ventromedial hypothalamus, leads to obesity caused by the overconsumption of food. The study's rats were from the same litter, which had been a closed colony for multiple years. The two rats in each pair had no more than a 3% difference in weight. Rats were paired at four weeks old. Unpaired rats were used as controls. The rats were conjoined in three ways. In early experiments, the peritoneal cavities were opened and connected between the two rats. In later experiments, to avoid the risk of tangling the two rats' intestines together, smaller cuts were made. After further refinement of the experimental procedure, the abdominal cavities were not opened, and the rats were conjoined at the hip bone with minimal cutting. To prove that the two animals were sharing blood, researchers injected dye into one rat's veins, and the pigment would show up in the conjoined rat.

In each pair, one rat became obese and exhibited hyperphagia. The weight of the rat with the surgical lesion rose rapidly for a few months, then reached a plateau as a direct result of the surgical procedure. After the procedure, the rat with the impaired hypothalamus ate voraciously while the paired rat's appetite decreased. The paired rat became obviously thin throughout the experiment, even rejecting food when it was offered.

Later studies identified this satiety factor as the adipose-derived hormone leptin. Many hormones and metabolites were proven not to be the satiety factor that caused one rat to starve in the experiments. Leptin seemed like a viable candidate. Starting in 1977, Ruth B.S. Harris, a graduate student under Hervey, repeated previous studies about parabiosis in rats and mice. Due to the discovery of leptin, she analyzed leptin concentrations of the mice in the parabiotic experiments. After injecting leptin into each pair's obese mouse, she found that leptin circulated between the conjoined animals, but the circulation of leptin took some time to reach equilibrium. As a result of the injections, the almost immediate weight loss resulted in the parabiotic pairs due to increased inhibition. Approximately 50–70% of fat was lost in pairs. The obese mouse lost only fat. The lean mouse lost muscle mass and fat. Harris concluded that leptin levels are increased in obese animals, but other factors could also affect them. Also, leptin was determined to decrease fat storage in both obese and thin animals.

Early parabiotic experiments also included cancer research. One study, published in 1966 by Friedell, studied radiation's effects with X-rays on ovarian tumors. To study the tumors, two adult female rats were conjoined. The left rat was shielded, and the right rat was exposed to high levels of radiation. The rats were given a controlled amount of food and water. 149 of 328 pairs showed possible ovarian tumors in the irradiated animals, but not in their partners. This result matched previous studies of single rats.

=== Aging research ===
Chronic diseases of age are studied by conjoining an older animal with a younger animal. Known as heterochronic parabiosis, this process has been used in studies to investigate the age-related and disease-related changes in the composition of the blood, especially plasma proteome. This process could be used to research cardiovascular disease, diabetes, osteoarthritis, and Alzheimer's disease. As animals age, their oligodendrocytes reduce in efficiency, resulting in decreased myelination, causing negative effects on the central nervous system (CNS). Julia Ruckh and fellow researchers have used parabiosis to study remyelination from adult stem cells to see if conjoining young with older mice could reverse or delay this process. The two mice were conjoined in the experiment, and demyelination was induced via injection into the older mice. The experiment determined that the younger mice's factors reversed CNS demyelination in older mice by revitalizing the oligodendrocytes. The monocytes from the younger mice also enhanced the older mice's ability to clear myelin debris because the young monocytes can clear lipids from myelin sheaths more effectively than older monocytes. The conjoining of the two animals reversed the effects of age on the myelination cells. The ability of the young mouse's cells was unaffected. Enhanced immunity from the younger mouse also promoted the general health of the older mouse in each pair. The results of this experiment could lead to therapy processes for people with demyelinating diseases like multiple sclerosis.

Studies using heterochronic parabiosis have shown that exposure of old mice to young blood can reverse some age-related impairments in multiple tissues, including the brain, liver, heart, and skeletal muscle. Conversely, young mice exposed to old blood often show signs of accelerated aging.

- In a landmark study, Villeda et al. (2011) found that young blood improved neurogenesis and synaptic plasticity in aged mice.
- Subsequent work by Conboy et al. showed that rejuvenation effects are mediated not just by beneficial factors in young blood, but also by dilution or suppression of age-related inhibitory signals.

== Natural parabiosis ==
The term is also applicable to genetic chimerism, in which two embryos can merge to form a single individual.

Obligate parasitic reproduction is observed in Anglerfish of the family Ceratiidae, in which the circulatory systems of the males and females unite completely. Without the attachment of males to females, the endocrine functions cannot mature; the individuals fail to develop properly and die young and without reproducing.

Mutually symbiotic parabiotic reproduction similar to anglerfish can be seen in flatworms of Diplozoidae, where two hermaphroditic individuals fuse together in order to mature.

Plants growing closely together roots or stems in intimate contact sometimes form natural grafts. In parasitic plants such as mistletoe and dodder the haustoria unite the circulatory systems of the host and the parasite so intimately that parasitic twiners such as Cassytha may act as vectors carrying disease organisms from one host plant to another.

== Social parabiosis ==
=== Social organisms sharing nests ===
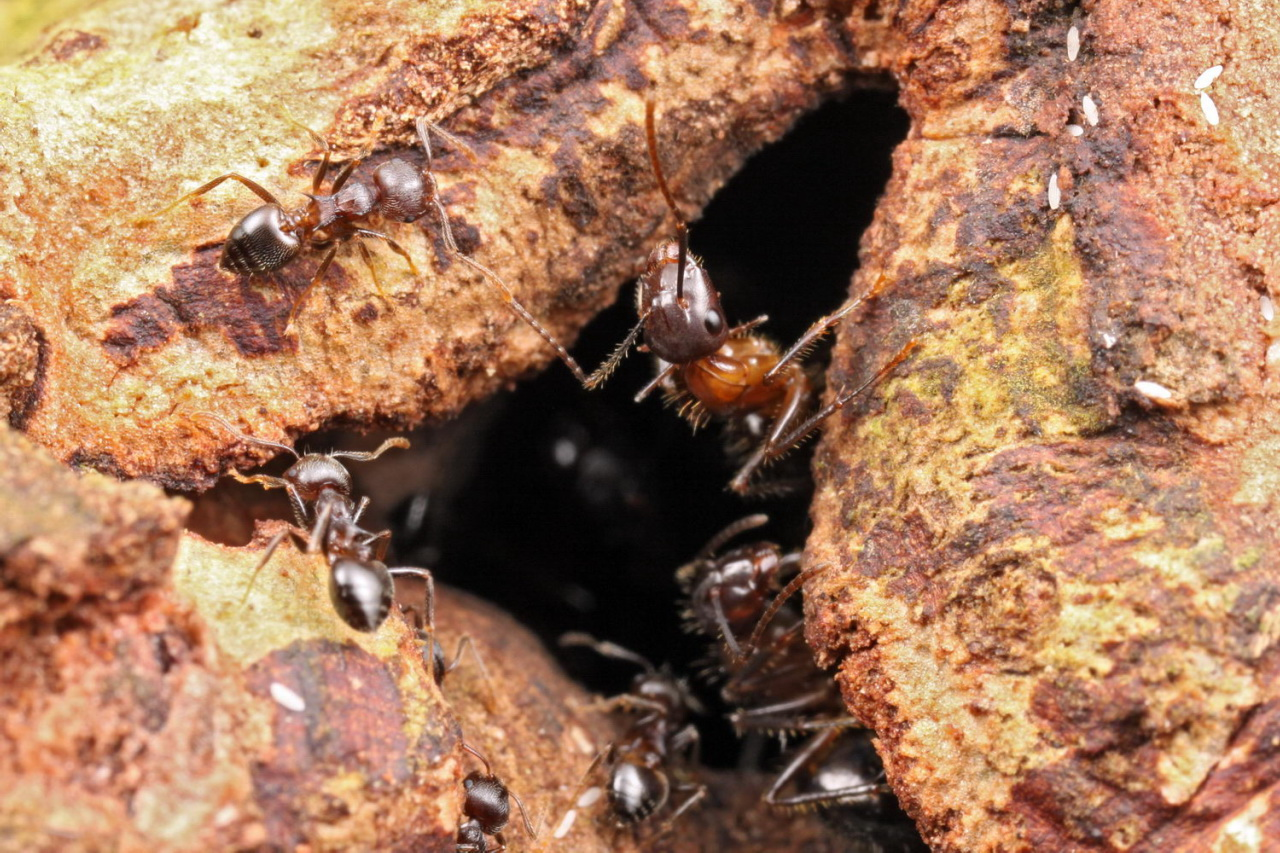
Crematogaster modiglianii and Camponotus rufifemur ants sharing a nest

Ant colonies can share their nests with essentially unrelated species of ants, and even non-ants. They did not obviously share anything beyond the nests' upkeep, even segregating their brood, so these were very surprising observations; most ants are radically intolerant of intruders, usually including even intruders of their own species.

In the early 20th century Auguste-Henri Forel coined the term "parabiosis" for such associations, and it was adopted by the likes of William Morton Wheeler. Furthermore, there is evidence for the partitioning of functions of work between the two species in the nest. Early reports that parabiotic ant colonies forage and feed together peacefully also have been qualified by observations that revealed ants of one species in such an association aggressively displacing members of the other species from artificially provided food, while also profiting by following their recruitment trails to new food sources. Benefits from shared nest defence and maintenance even when there is neither direct cooperation nor interaction between the two associated populations in a nest.

== Etymology ==
Parabiosis derives most directly from Neo-Latin, but the Latin in turn derives from two classical Greek roots. The first is παρά (para) for "beside" or "next to". In modern etymology, this root appears in various senses, such as "close to", "outside of", and "different".

- In the physiological sense of "parabiosis," "para" apparently was intended to mean "next to."
- In describing transiently inactive physiological states, "para" apparently meant "outside of."
- In ecological usage, the word was coined by the entomologist Auguste-Henri Forel as an analog to "symbiosis," also in the sense of "next to." However, in this case, the emphasis was in contrast to "together" ("sym-").

The second classical Greek root from which the Latin derives is βίος (bios), meaning "life."

== See also ==
- Aging research – Study of the biological, psychological, and social aspects of aging
- Commensalism – Beneficial symbiosis between species
- Mutualism (biology) – Mutually beneficial interaction between species
- Neurogenesis – Generation of cells within the nervous system
- Senescence – Deterioration of function with age
- Stem cell niche – Specific location in the body containing stem cells
- Symbiosis – Ecological interaction between taxa
