= Rudolf Mansfeld =

German botanist and agricultural scientist

Rudolf Mansfeld (17 January 1901, Berlin – 1960) was a German botanist and agricultural scientist.

For more than twenty years, he served as a curator at the Botanical Garden and Botanical Museum in Berlin-Dahlem, where he specialized in the study of Orchidaceae (orchids) and Euphorbiaceae (spurges). After World War II, by way of a request from agriculturalist Hans Stubbe (1902–1989), he accepted a position as a laboratory technician at the Gatersleben Institute. In 1949, he succeeded Werner Rothmaler (1908–1962) as departmental director. During his last ten years at Gatersleben, he was in charge of the department of systematics.

== Works ==
As an agricultural scientist, he developed principles for the classification of cultivated plants, and also provided a scientific basis towards the establishment and preservation of large collections of cultivated plants (gene banks). He is remembered for the encyclopedia, Verzeichnis landwirtschaftlicher und gärtnerischer Kulturpflanzen (ohne Zierpflanzen), later translated into English and published as "Mansfeld's Encyclopedia of Agricultural and Horticultural Crops". Other noted writings by Mansfeld include:

- Figuren-Atlas zu den Orchideenflora der südamerikanischen Kordillerenstaaten, 1929 (with Rudolf Schlechter) - Atlas of orchids from the South American Cordillera.
- Figuren-Atlas zu den Orchidaceen von Deutsch-Neu-Guinea, 1929 (with Rudolf Schlechter) - Atlas of orchids from German New Guinea.
- Die Technik der wissenschaftlichen Pflanzenbenennung; Einführung in die Internationalen Regeln der botanischen Nomenklatur, 1949 - The technique of scientific plant names; introduction to the International Rules of Botanical Nomenclature.
- Vorläufiges Verzeichnis landwirtschaftlich oder gärtnerisch kultivierter Pflanzenarten, 1959 - Provisional list of agricultural/horticultural cultivated plant species.
