= Lesia (plant) =

Scientific classification
- Kingdom: Plantae
- Clade: Tracheophytes
- Clade: Angiosperms
- Clade: Eudicots
- Clade: Asterids
- Order: Lamiales
- Family: Gesneriaceae
- Subfamily: Gesnerioideae
- Genus: Lesia; J.L.Clark & J.F.Sm.

Species
- See text.

Genus of flowering plants

Lesia is a genus of flowering plants in the family Gesneriaceae, subfamily Gesnerioideae.

== Species ==
As of April 2021, Plants of the World Online accepted two species:

- Lesia savannarum (C.V.Morton) J.L.Clark & J.F.Sm.
- Lesia tepuiensis G.E.Ferreira & Chautems
