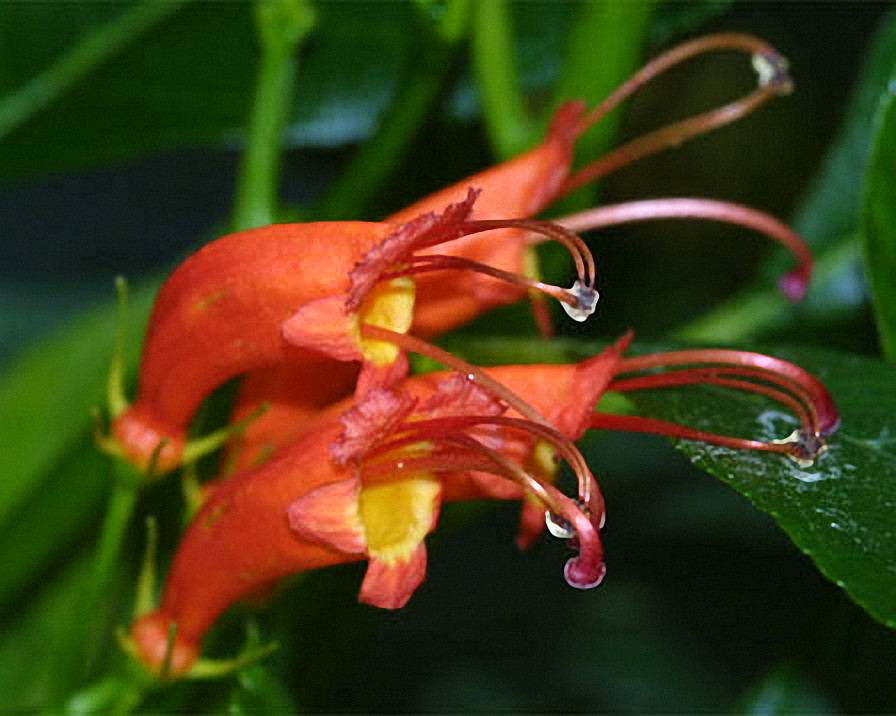
- Gesneria ventricosa

Scientific classification
- Kingdom: Plantae
- Clade: Embryophytes
- Clade: Tracheophytes
- Clade: Spermatophytes
- Clade: Angiosperms
- Clade: Eudicots
- Clade: Asterids
- Clade: Lamiids
- Order: Lamiales
- Family: Gesneriaceae
- Subfamily: Gesnerioideae; Burnett

= Gesnerioideae =

Subfamily of flowering plants

The Gesnerioideae are a subfamily of plants in the family Gesneriaceae: based on the type genus Gesneria. Although genera typically originate in the New World, some species have become widely distributed as ornamental plants.

== Description ==
Gesnerioideae is one of two main subfamilies in the Gesneriaceae, the other being Didymocarpoideae. (The third subfamily, Sanangoideae, contains only the genus Sanango.) Gesnerioideae seedlings have normal cotyledons of the same size and shape (isocotylous), whereas the cotyledons of Didymocarpoideae are usually, but not always, eventually different in size and shape (anisocotylous). Gesnerioideae flowers usually have four fertile stamens, rarely two or five. In other respects, Gesnerioideae species are very variable. The ovary may be superior, semi-inferior or inferior, and the fruit takes various forms.

== Taxonomy ==
The original use of the name for the subfamily is attributed to Gilbert Thomas Burnett in 1835. Burnett divided his circumscription of the family Gesneriaceae into "Besleridae" and "Gesneridae". The latter was distinguished by having an inferior or semi-inferior ovary and the calyx adhering to the gynoecium ("germen"). However, Burnett's circumscription of the family and subfamilies was very different to the modern conception. He placed the "Didymocarpidae" (a name which corresponds to the modern Didymocarpoideae), not in Gesneriaceae, but in Acanthaceae. Since about 1997, phylogenetic studies, mostly based on molecular approaches, have resulted in major changes to the traditional taxonomy and classification of the family Gesneriaceae, at every level from genus upwards.

=== Tribes and genera ===
A classification published in 2020 divides the subfamily into five tribes.

- Tribe Titanotricheae
- Titanotrichum
- Tribe Napeantheae
- Napeanthus
- Tribe Beslerieae
- Anetanthus
- Besleria
- Cremosperma
- Cremospermopsis
- Gasteranthus
- Reldia
- Resia
- Shuaria
- Tylopsacas
- Tribe Coronanthereae
- Asteranthera
- Coronanthera
- Depanthus
- Fieldia, including Lenbrassia
- Mitraria
- Negria
- Rhabdothamnus
- Sarmienta
- Tribe Gesnerieae
- Achimenes
- Alloplectus
- Alsobia
- Amalophyllon
- Bellonia
- Centrosolenia
- Chautemsia
- Christopheria
- Chrysothemis
- Cobananthus
- Codonanthe
- Codonanthopsis
- Columnea
- Corytoplectus
- Crantzia
- Cremersia
- Diastema
- Drymonia
- Episcia
- Eucodonia
- Gesneria
- Glossoloma
- Gloxinella
- Gloxinia
- Gloxiniopsis
- Goyazia
- Heppiella
- Kohleria
- Lampadaria
- Lembocarpus
- Lesia
- Mandirola
- Monopyle
- Moussonia
- Nautilocalyx
- Nematanthus
- Neomortonia
- Niphaea
- Nomopyle
- Oerstedina
- Pachycaulos
- Pagothyra
- Paliavana
- Paradrymonia
- Pearcea
- Pheidonocarpa
- Phinaea
- Rhoogeton
- Rhytidophyllum
- Rufodorsia
- Seemannia
- Sinningia
- Smithiantha
- Solenophora
- Sphaerorrhiza
- Trichodrymonia
- Vanhouttea
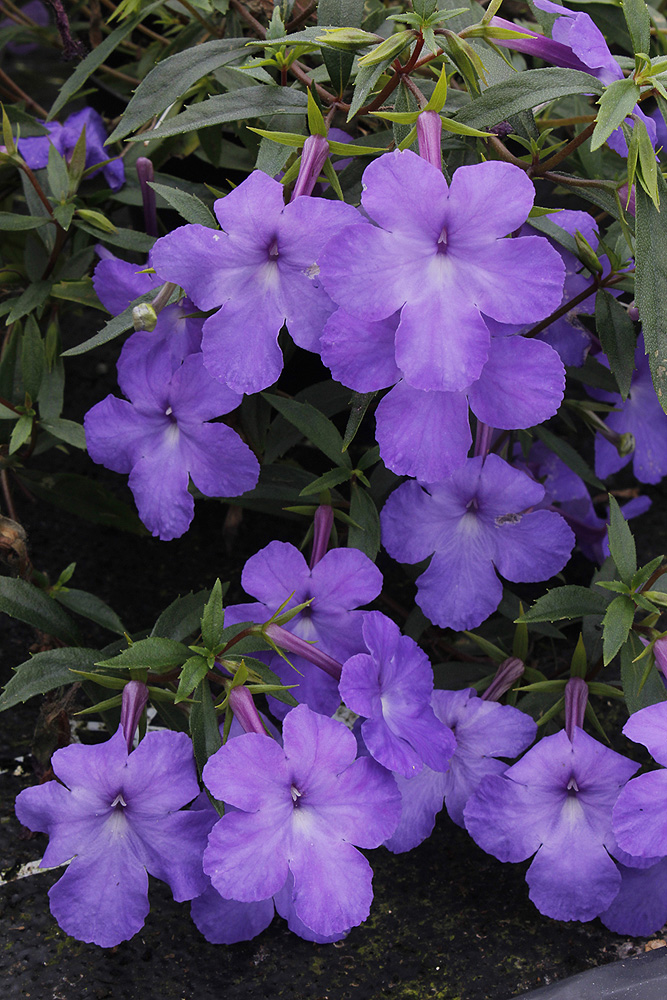
Achimenes cettoana in cultivation

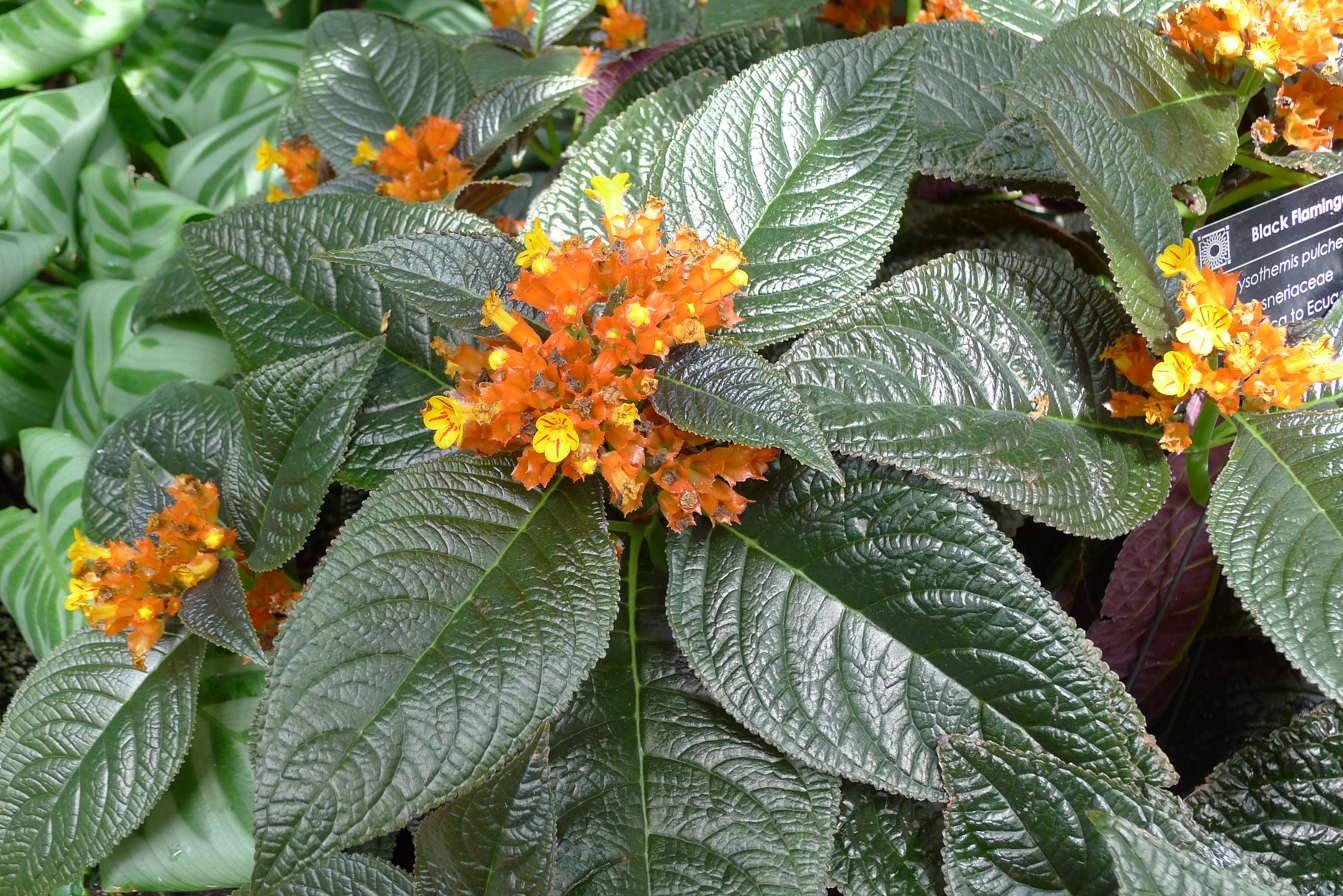
Chrysothemis pulchella in cultivation

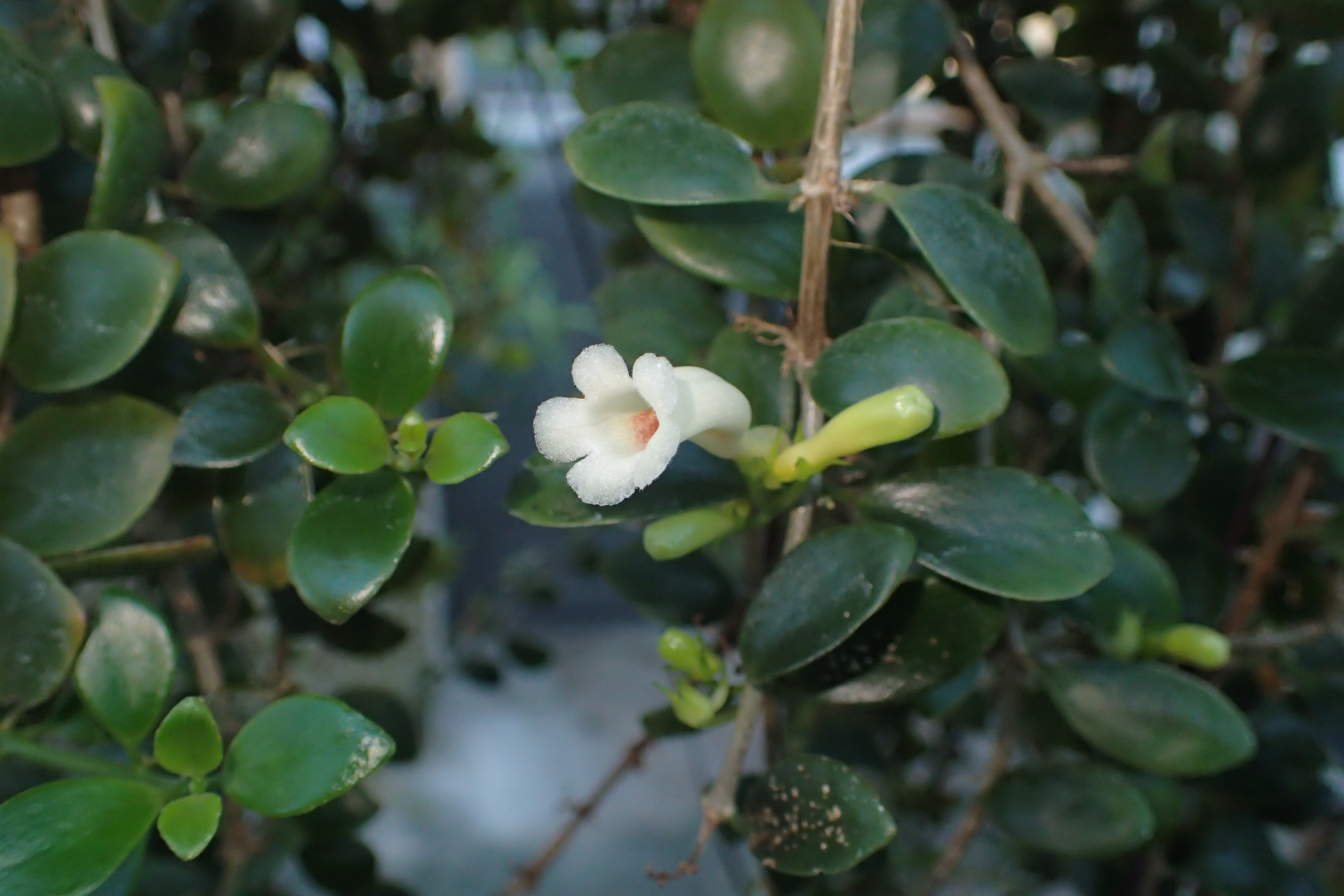
Codonanthopsis macradenia in cultivation

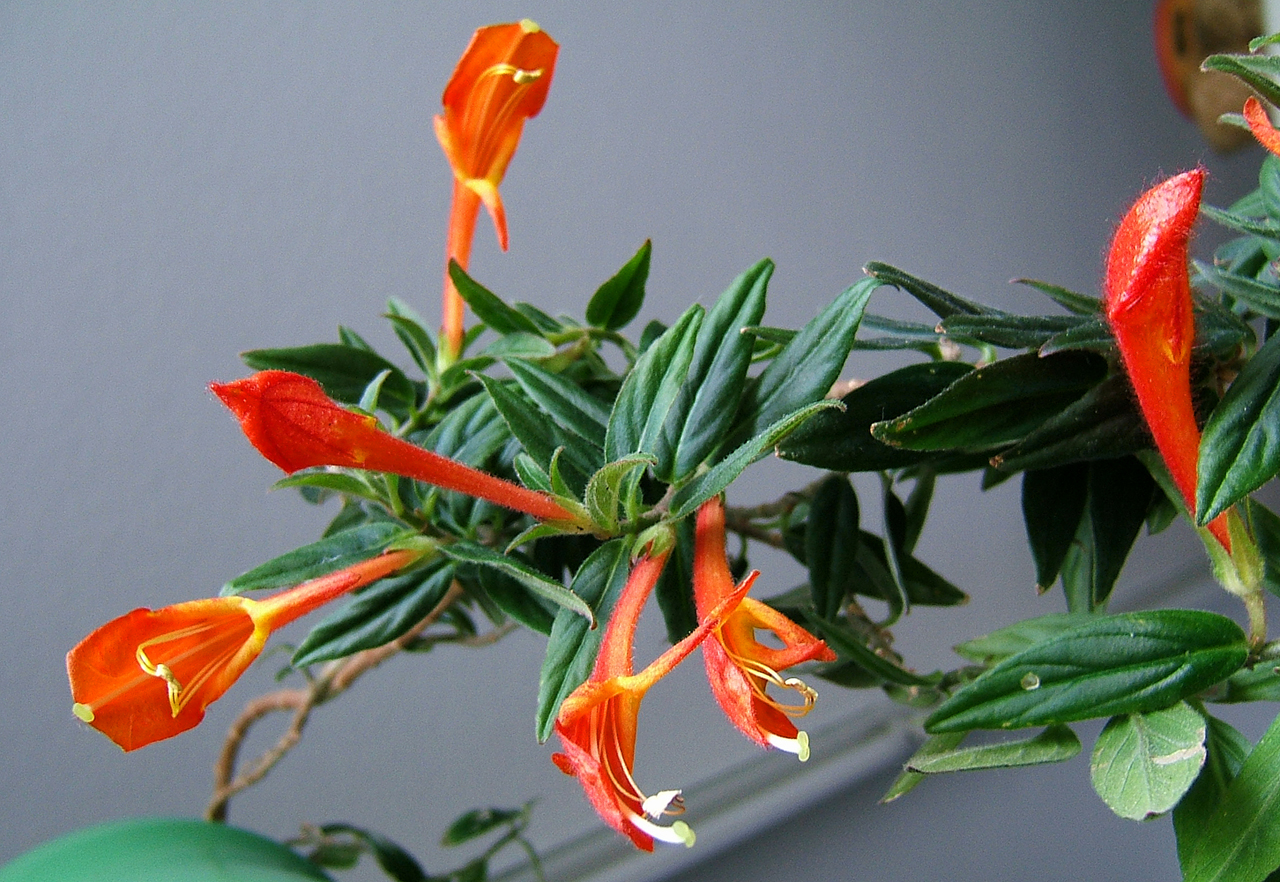
Columnea crassifolia

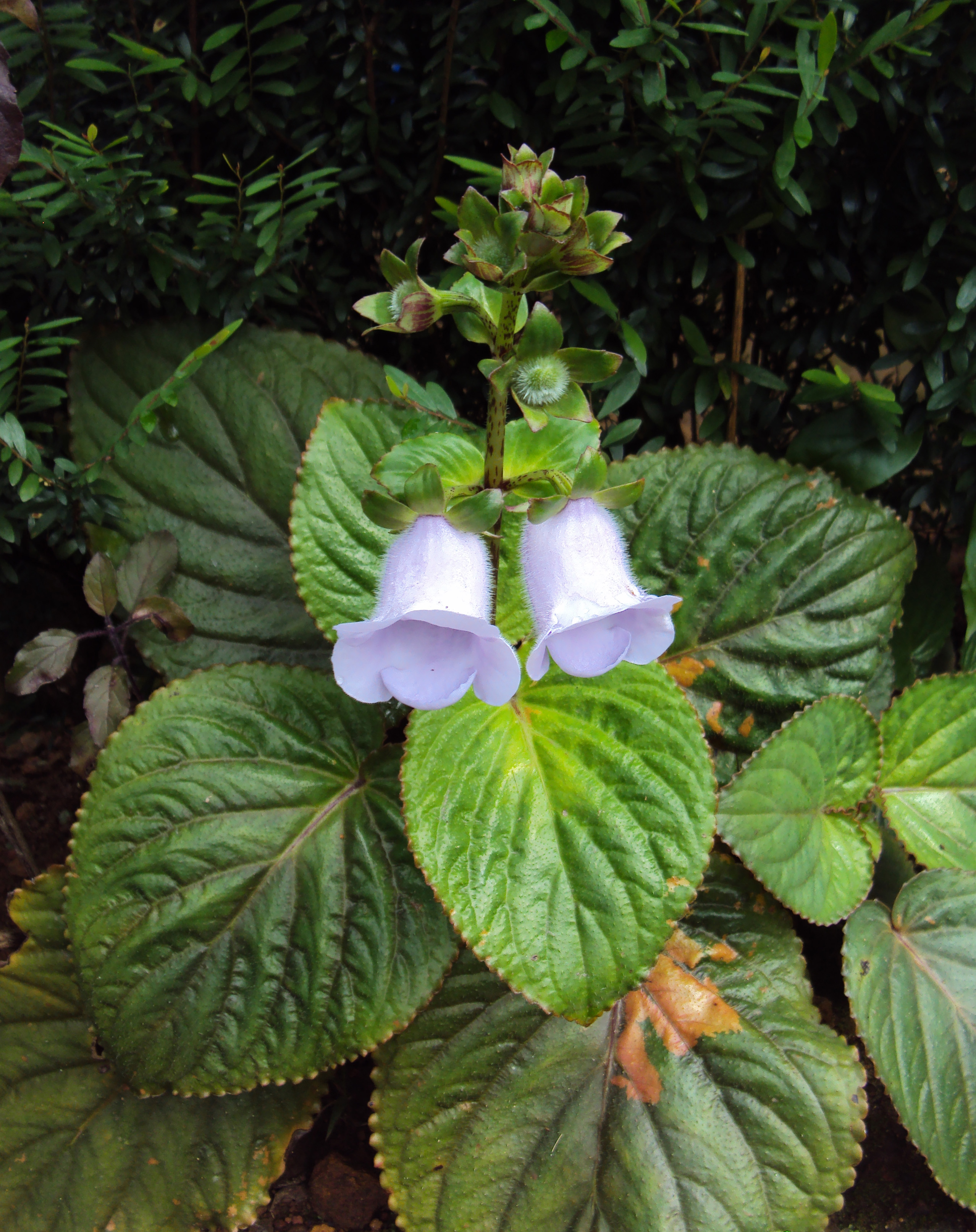
Gloxinia perennis

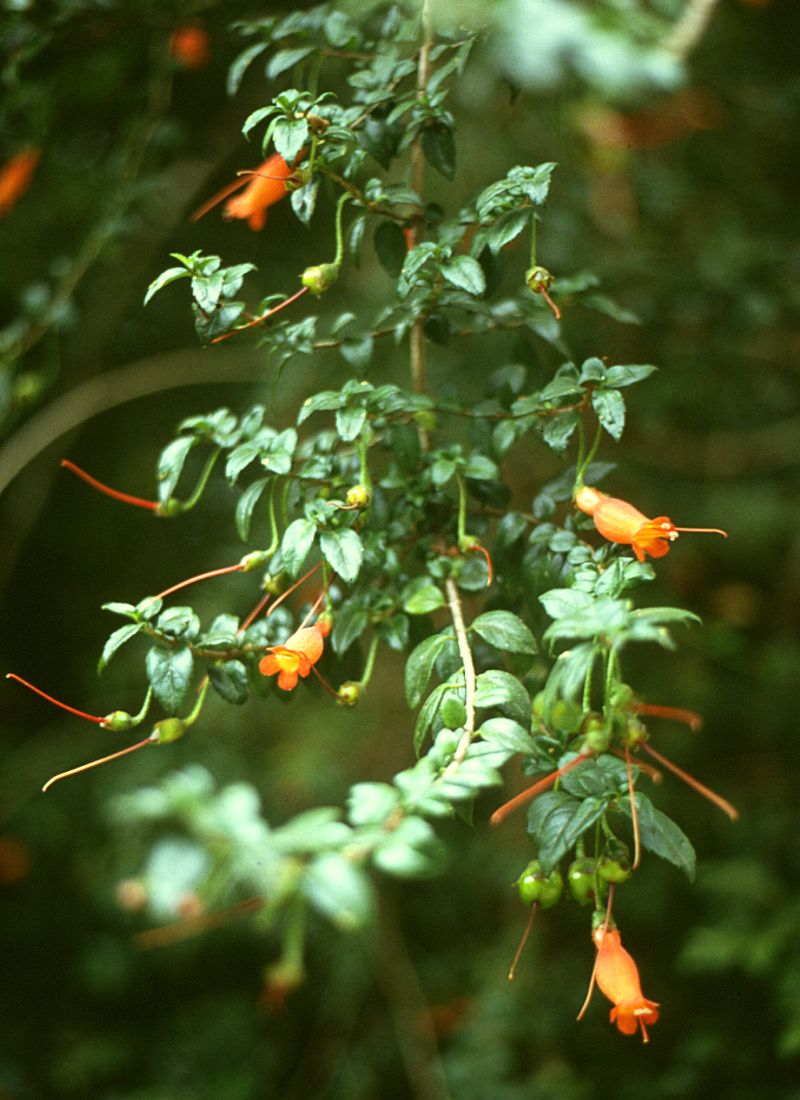
Mitraria coccinea

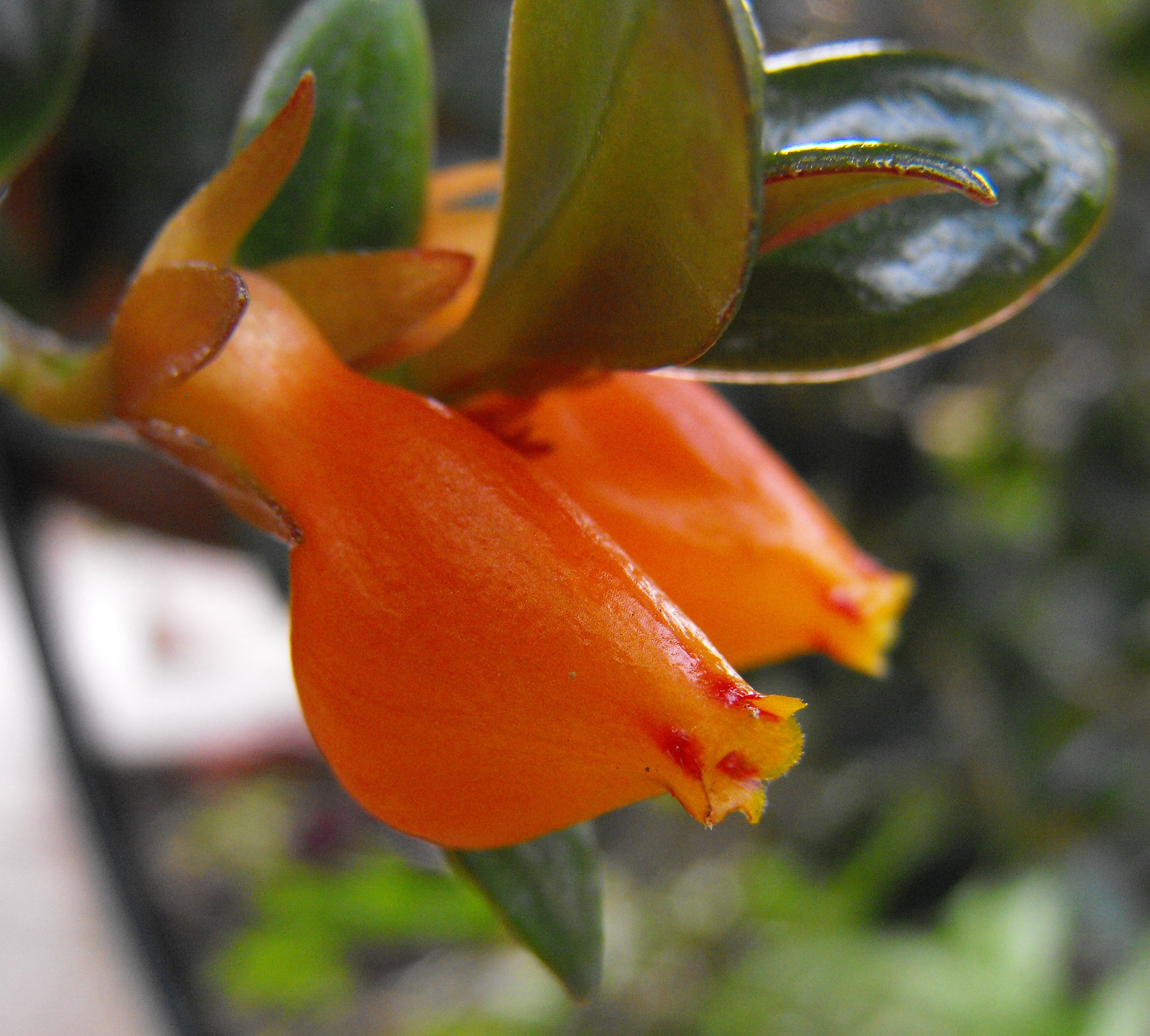
Nematanthus wettsteinii

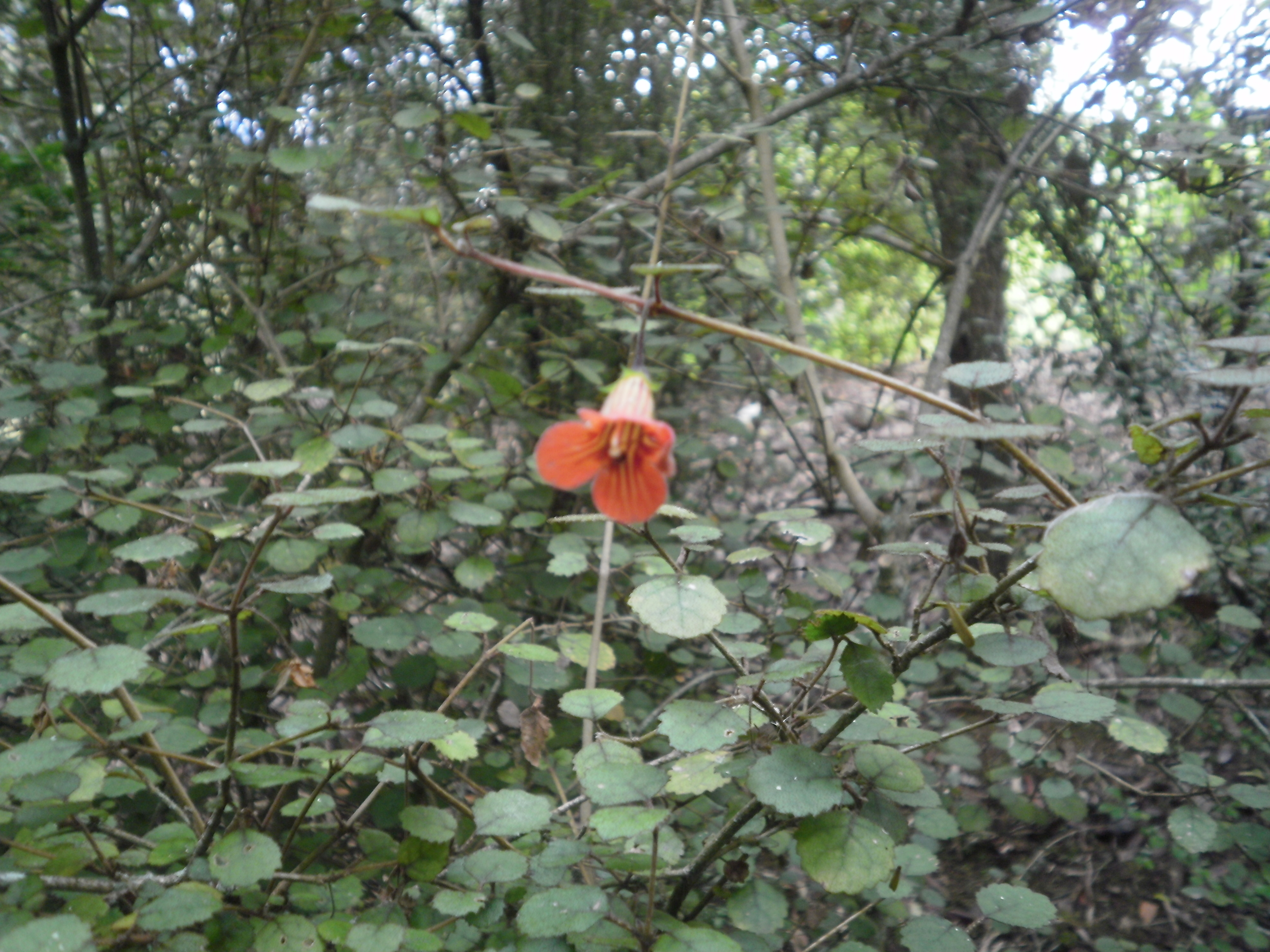
Rhabdothamnus solandri

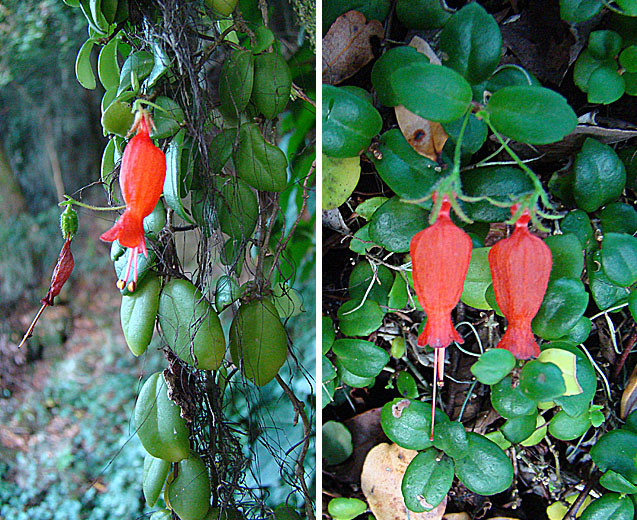
Sarmienta scandens

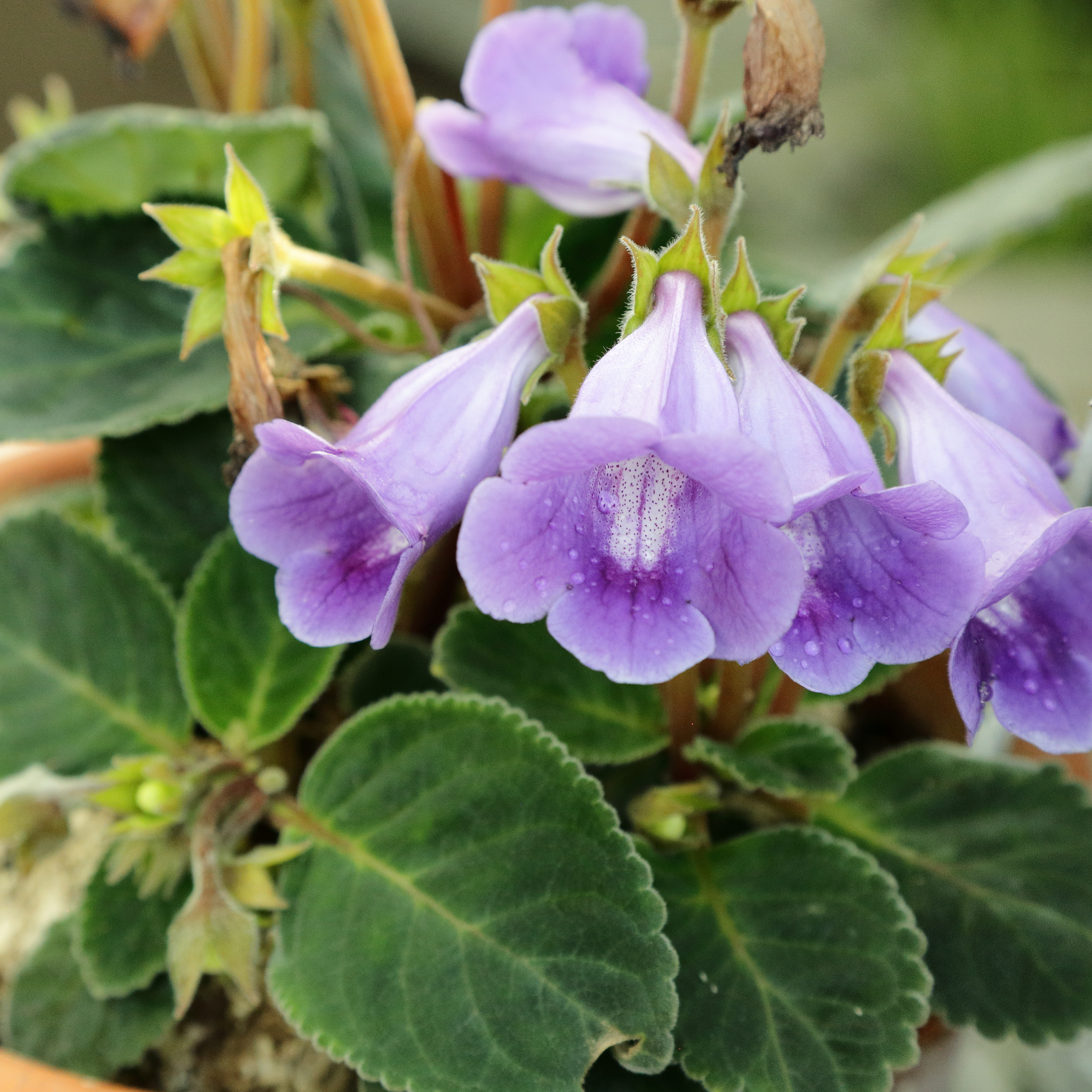
Sinningia speciosa

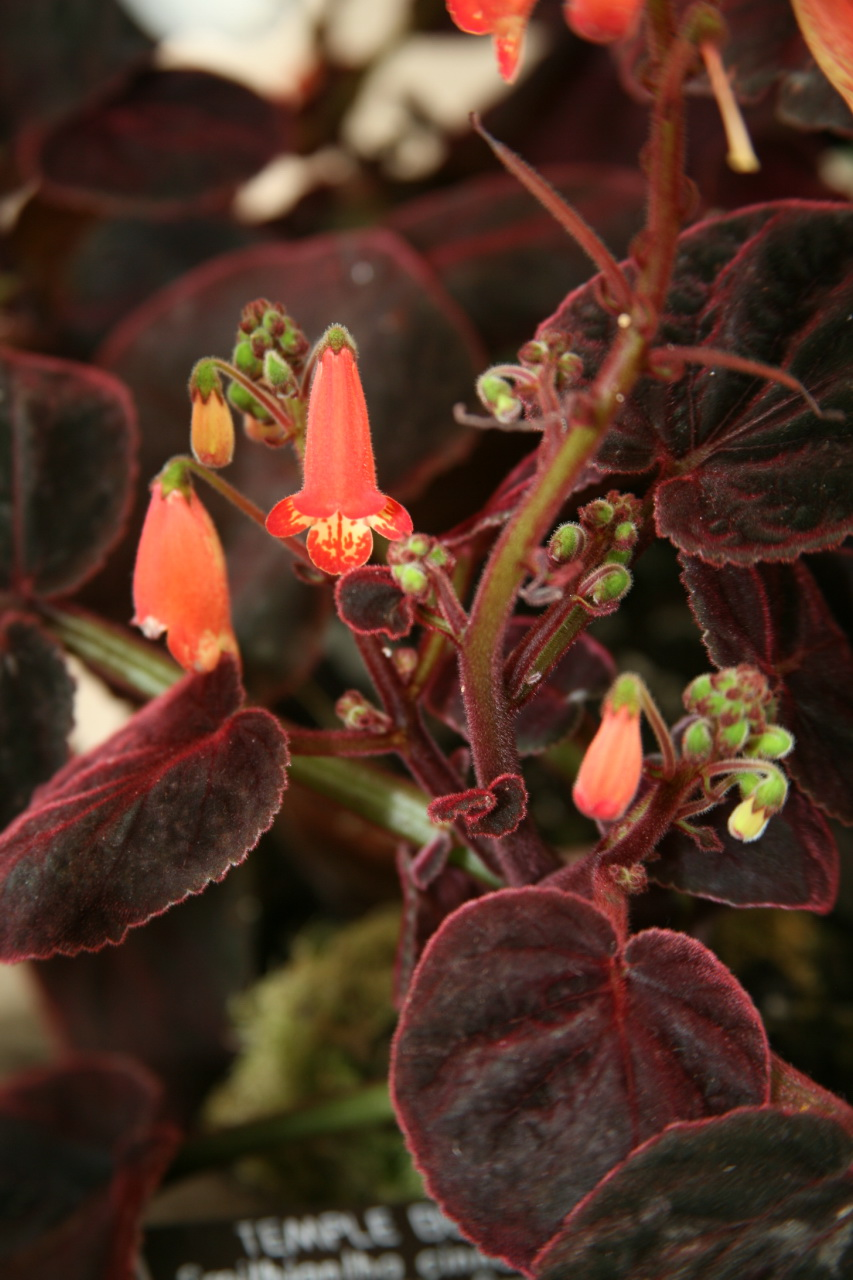
Smithiantha cinnabarina

== Distribution ==
With the exception of the genus Titanotrichum, which is native to eastern Asia, all the species of the subfamily Gesnerioideae are native from Central and South America through the southwest Pacific to Australia.
