= Squarestem =

Squarestem is a common name for several plants and may refer to:

- Chrysothemis pulchella
- Melanthera
