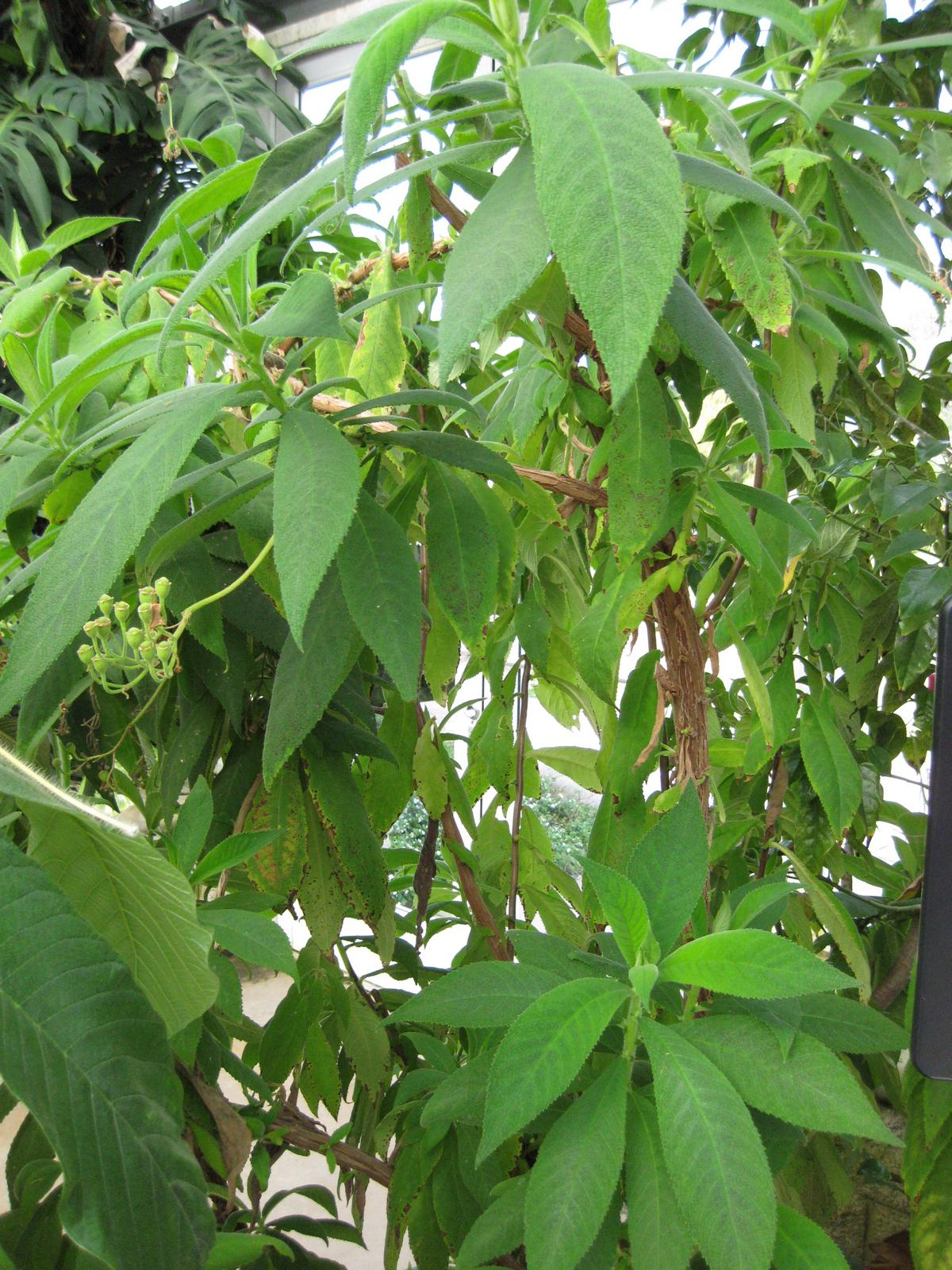

Scientific classification
- Kingdom: Plantae
- Clade: Embryophytes
- Clade: Tracheophytes
- Clade: Spermatophytes
- Clade: Angiosperms
- Clade: Eudicots
- Clade: Asterids
- Order: Lamiales
- Family: Gesneriaceae
- Genus: Alloplectus; Mart. (1829)

Species
- 7, see text

Synonyms
- Calycoplectus Oerst. (1861); Cobananthus Wiehler (1977); Heintzia H.Karst. (1848)

= Alloplectus =

Genus of flowering plants

Alloplectus is a genus of Neotropical plants in the family Gesneriaceae. A 2005 revision of the genus included five species, with the majority of species in the genus as traditionally circumscribed being transferred to Crantzia, Glossoloma, and Drymonia. Plants of the World Online currently accepts seven species.

== Species ==
Seven species are currently accepted.

- Alloplectus aquatilis C.V. Morton
- Alloplectus calochlamys Donn.Sm.
- Alloplectus hispidus (Kunth) Mart.
- Alloplectus inflatus J.L. Clark & L.E. Skog
- Alloplectus spectabilis Wiehler ex L.E.Skog & Steyerm.
- Alloplectus tessmannii Mansf.
- Alloplectus weirii (Kuntze) Wiehler

=== Transferred species ===
- Alloplectus crenatilobus = Drymonia crenatiloba
- Alloplectus herthae = Glossoloma herthae
- Alloplectus martinianus = Glossoloma martinianum
- Alloplectus penduliflorus = Glossoloma penduliflorum
- Alloplectus strigosus = Drymonia strigosa
- Alloplectus tetragonus = Glossoloma tetragonum
