= Glossoloma herthae =

Conservation status
- Data Deficient (IUCN 3.1)

Scientific classification
- Kingdom: Plantae
- Clade: Tracheophytes
- Clade: Angiosperms
- Clade: Eudicots
- Clade: Asterids
- Order: Lamiales
- Family: Gesneriaceae
- Genus: Glossoloma
- Species: G. herthae

Binomial name
- Glossoloma herthae (Mansf.)

Synonyms
- Alloplectus herthae Mansf.; Besleria horizontalis C.V.Morton

Species of plant

Glossoloma herthae is a plant species in the family Gesneriaceae. A recent review has moved it out of the genus Alloplectus.

It is endemic to Ecuador.

Its natural habitat is subtropical or tropical moist montane forests.
