= Amalophyllon miraculum =

Scientific classification
- Kingdom: Plantae
- Clade: Tracheophytes
- Clade: Angiosperms
- Clade: Eudicots
- Clade: Asterids
- Order: Lamiales
- Family: Gesneriaceae
- Genus: Amalophyllon
- Species: A. miraculum

Binomial name
- Amalophyllon miraculum (Wiehler) J.L.Clark

Species of flowering plant

Amalophyllon miraculum is a plant species in the family Gesneriaceae endemic to the Andes of Ecuador. It was discovered in Centinela, Ecuador in 2024.

The plant is small in stature and an obligate lithophyte. It lives near waterfalls due to its need of constant moisture.

This small plant with serrated leaves and tiny white flowers is named "miraculum" because its miraculous the species was still there after being thought to be extinct.
