= Monopyle sodiroana =

Conservation status
- Endangered (IUCN 3.1)

Scientific classification
- Kingdom: Plantae
- Clade: Tracheophytes
- Clade: Angiosperms
- Clade: Eudicots
- Clade: Asterids
- Order: Lamiales
- Family: Gesneriaceae
- Genus: Monopyle
- Species: M. sodiroana

Binomial name
- Monopyle sodiroana Fritsch

Species of flowering plant

Monopyle sodiroana is a species of plant in the family Gesneriaceae. It is endemic to Ecuador. Its natural habitats are subtropical or tropical moist lowland forests and subtropical or tropical moist montane forests.
