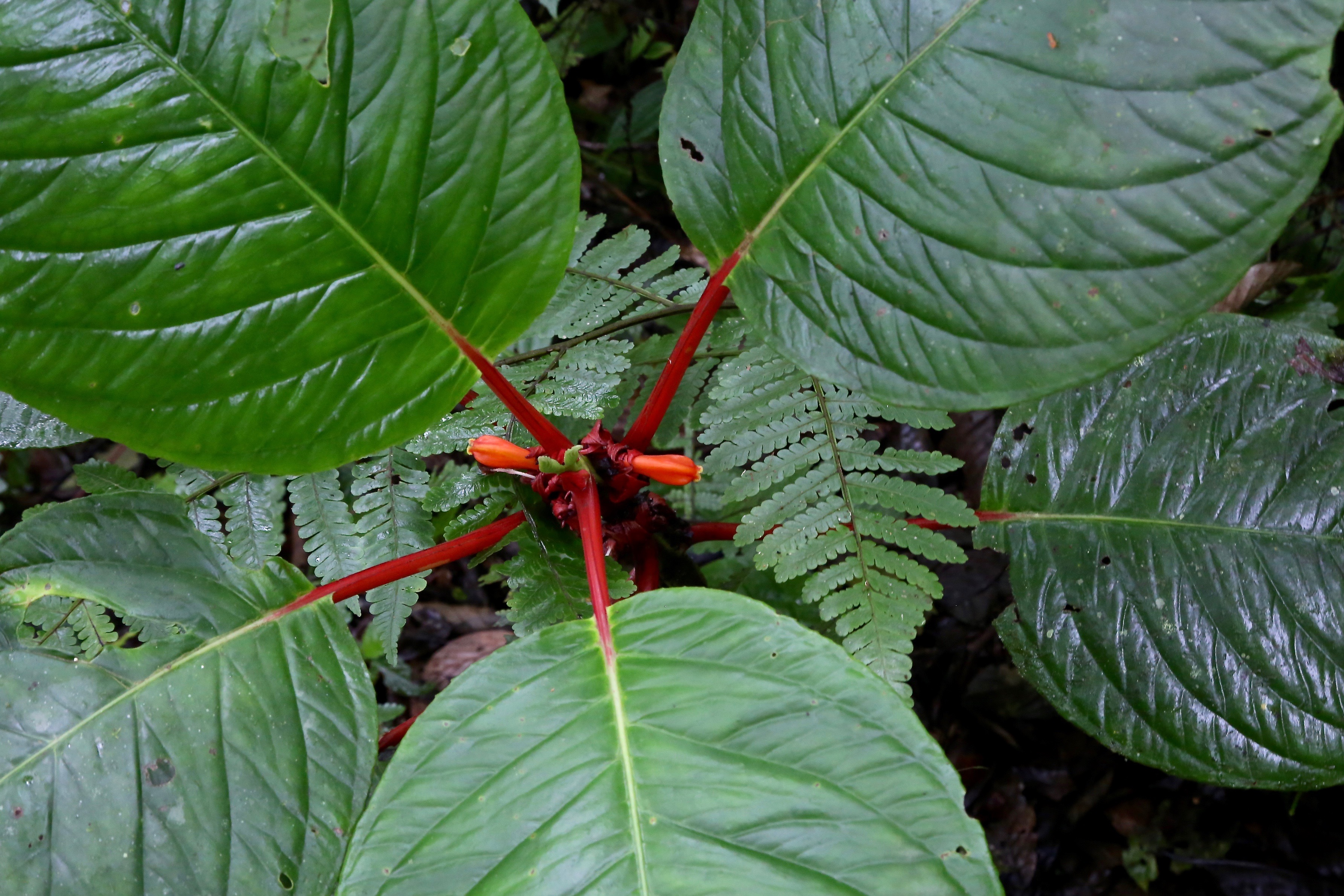

Scientific classification
- Kingdom: Plantae
- Clade: Tracheophytes
- Clade: Angiosperms
- Clade: Eudicots
- Clade: Asterids
- Order: Lamiales
- Family: Gesneriaceae
- Genus: Drymonia
- Species: D. urceolata

Binomial name
- Drymonia urceolata Wiehler

Synonyms
- Hypocyrta macrophylla Poepp.

= Drymonia urceolata =

Species of plant

Drymonia urceolata is a species of flowering plant in the genus Drymonia. It is a climber native to Colombia, Ecuador, and Peru.
