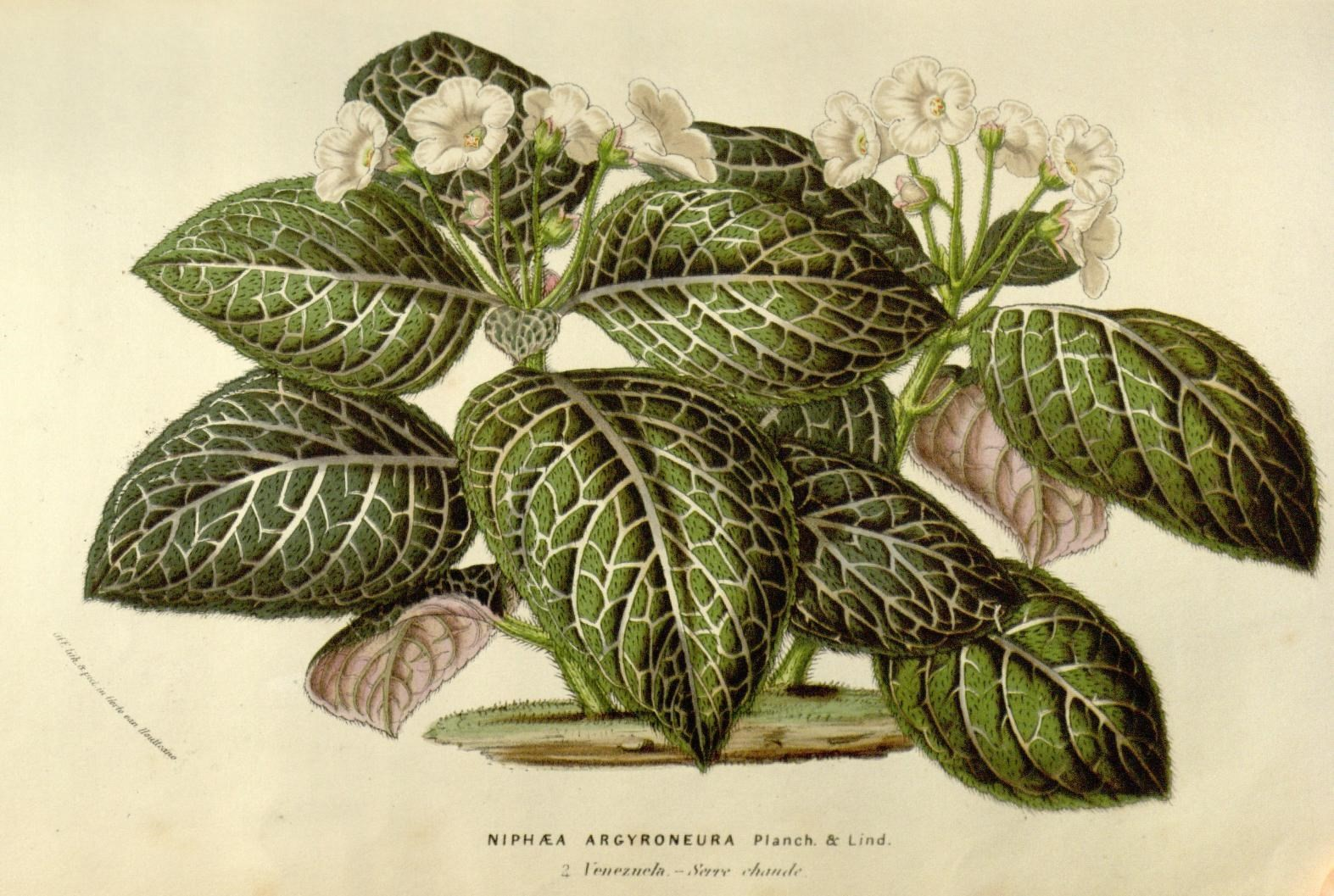
- Phinea albolineata, Niphea argyroneura, c1850

Scientific classification
- Kingdom: Plantae
- Clade: Tracheophytes
- Clade: Angiosperms
- Clade: Eudicots
- Clade: Asterids
- Order: Lamiales
- Family: Gesneriaceae
- Genus: Phinaea; Benth. (1876)

Species
- 3; see text

= Phinaea =

Genus of flowering plants

Phinaea is a genus of flowering plants in family Gesneriaceae. It contains three species native to the Americas, including western and central Mexico, Cuba and Haiti, and Colombia and northern Brazil.

== Species ==
Three species are accepted.

- Phinaea albolineata (Hook.) Benth. ex Hemsl. – northeastern Colombia and northern Brazil (Pará)
- Phinaea multiflora C.V.Morton – western and central Mexico
- Phinaea pulchella (Griseb.) C.V.Morton – western Cuba and Haiti
  - Phinaea pulchella var. domingensis (Urb. & Ekman) C.V.Morton – Haiti (Massif de la Hotte)
  - Phinaea pulchella var. pulchella – western Cuba

=== Formerly placed here ===
- Amalophyllon divaricatum (Poepp.) Boggan, L.E.Skog & Roalson (as Phinaea divaricata (Poepp.) Wiehler)
- Amalophyllon ecuadoranum (Wiehler) J.L.Clark (as Phinaea ecuadorana Wiehler)
