= Amalophyllon =

Scientific classification
- Kingdom: Plantae
- Clade: Tracheophytes
- Clade: Angiosperms
- Clade: Eudicots
- Clade: Asterids
- Order: Lamiales
- Family: Gesneriaceae
- Tribe: Gesnerieae
- Genus: Amalophyllon; Brandegee (1914)

Genus of flowering plants

Amalophyllon is a genus of flowering plants belonging to the family Gesneriaceae. It includes 13 species native to the tropical Americas, ranging from southern Mexico through Central America to Venezuela and Peru.

== Species ==
13 species are accepted.

- Amalophyllon albiflorum (Rusby) Boggan, L.E.Skog & Roalson
- Amalophyllon caripense (Klotzsch & Hanst.) Boggan, L.E.Skog & Roalson
- Amalophyllon clarkii Boggan, L.E.Skog & Roalson
- Amalophyllon divaricatum (Poepp.) Boggan, L.E.Skog & Roalson
- Amalophyllon ecuadoranum (Wiehler) J.L.Clark
- Amalophyllon laceratum (C.V.Morton) Boggan, L.E.Skog & Roalson
- Amalophyllon macrophylloides Boggan, L.E.Skog & Roalson
- Amalophyllon macrophyllum (Wiehler) Boggan, L.E.Skog & Roalson
- Amalophyllon miraculum (Wiehler) J.L.Clark, sp. nov.
- Amalophyllon parviflorum (A.Braun & C.D.Bouché) Boggan, L.E.Skog & Roalson
- Amalophyllon repens (Donn.Sm.) Boggan, L.E.Skog & Roalson
- Amalophyllon roezlii (Regel) Boggan, L.E.Skog & Roalson
- Amalophyllon rubidum (Lem.) Boggan, L.E.Skog & Roalson
- Amalophyllon rupestre Brandegee
