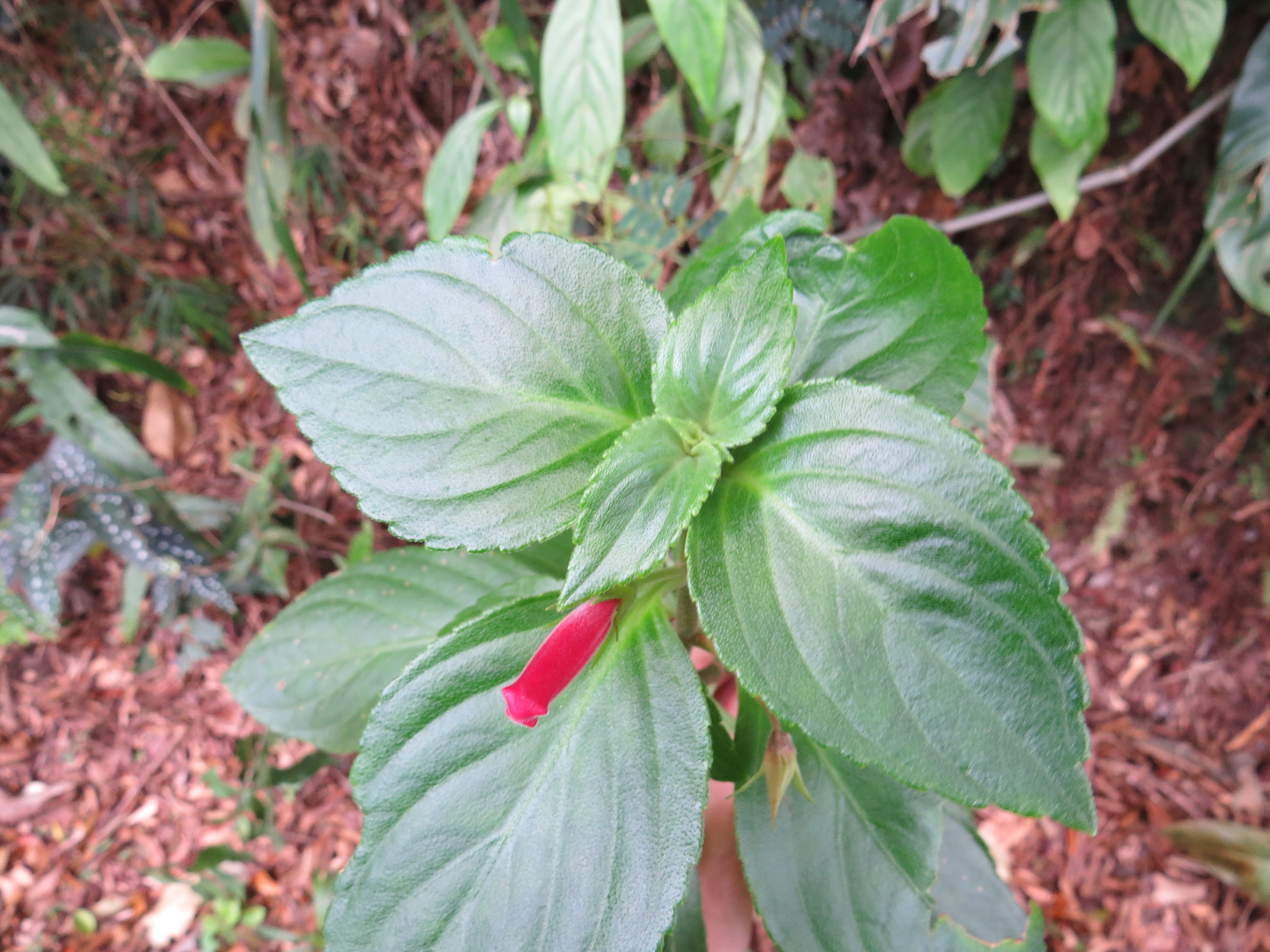
- Vanhouttea gardneri

Scientific classification
- Kingdom: Plantae
- Clade: Embryophytes
- Clade: Tracheophytes
- Clade: Angiosperms
- Clade: Eudicots
- Clade: Asterids
- Order: Lamiales
- Family: Gesneriaceae
- Subfamily: Gesnerioideae
- Genus: Vanhouttea; Lem. (1845)

Species
- 10; see text

Synonyms
- Houttea Decne. (1848), nom. illeg.

= Vanhouttea =

Genus of flowering plants

Vanhouttea is a genus of flowering plants in the African violet family Gesneriaceae, native to south-eastern Brazil. They are pollinated by hummingbirds.

== Species ==
Ten species are currently accepted.

- Vanhouttea bradeana Hoehne
- Vanhouttea brueggeri Chautems
- Vanhouttea calcarata Lem.
- Vanhouttea fruticulosa (Glaz. ex Hoehne) Chautems
- Vanhouttea gardneri (Hook.) Fritsch
- Vanhouttea hilariana Chautems
- Vanhouttea lanata Fritsch
- Vanhouttea leonii Chautems
- Vanhouttea mollis Fritsch
- Vanhouttea pendula Chautems
