= Pachycaulos =

Scientific classification
- Kingdom: Plantae
- Clade: Tracheophytes
- Clade: Angiosperms
- Clade: Eudicots
- Clade: Asterids
- Order: Lamiales
- Family: Gesneriaceae
- Subfamily: Gesnerioideae
- Genus: Pachycaulos; J.L.Clark & J.F.Sm.

Genus of plants

Pachycaulos is a genus of flowering plants belonging to the family Gesneriaceae. It has two species, Pachycaulos nummularia and Pachycaulos huancabambae. Its native range is Southeastern Mexico to Peru.

== Taxonomy ==
The species was first described as Hypocyrta nummularia by Johannes von Hanstein in 1865. The epithet nummularia is a noun in apposition. In 2013, J.L. Clark and J.F. Smith moved it to their new genus Pachycaulos using the incorrect adjectival form of the epithet, nummularium, rather than the correct nummularia.
