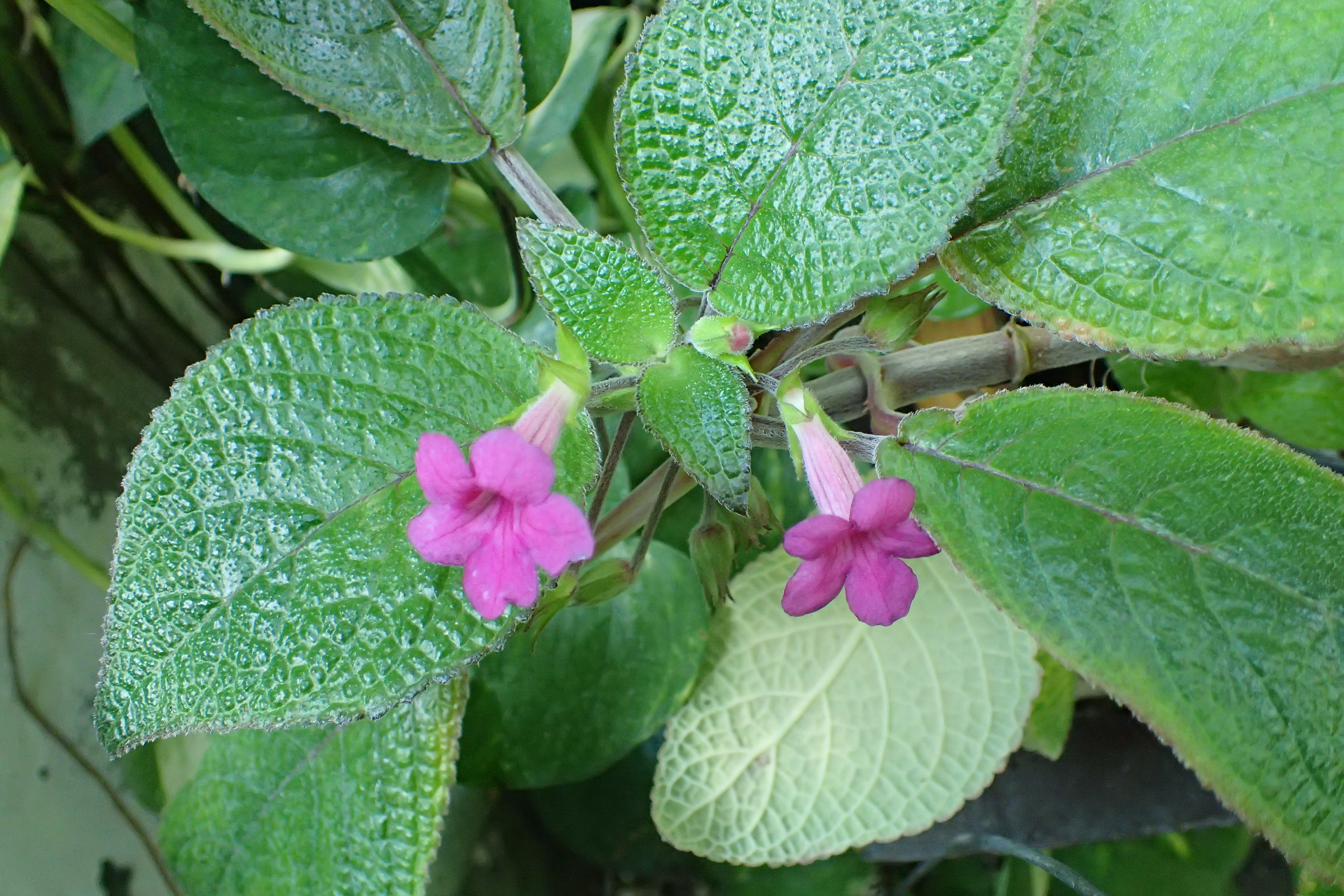

Scientific classification
- Kingdom: Plantae
- Clade: Tracheophytes
- Clade: Angiosperms
- Clade: Eudicots
- Clade: Asterids
- Order: Lamiales
- Family: Gesneriaceae
- Genus: Chrysothemis
- Species: C. melittifolia

Binomial name
- Chrysothemis melittifolia (L.) M.M.Mora & J.L.Clark

Synonyms
- List: Alloplectus melittifolius (L.) Mart. ex Loudon; Besleria melittifolia L.; Episcia melittifolia (L.) Mart.; Nautilocalyx melittifolius (L.) Wiehler; Skiophila melittifolia (L.) Hanst.; Besleria guadalupensis DC.; Besleria mollis Hook. ex Steud.; Besleria mollissima Spreng.; Chrysothemis venosa Decne.; Episcia guadalupensis (DC.) Hanst.; Episcia melittifolia f. guadalupensis (DC.) Stehlé; Episcia melittifolia var. guadelupensis (DC.) Urb.; Nautilocalyx melittifolius var. guadalupensis (DC.) Fournet

= Chrysothemis melittifolia =

Species of flowering plant

Chrysothemis melittifolia is a species of plant in the family Gesneriaceae. It is native to the Lesser Antilles and Trinidad and Tobago. It grows to 30 cm in height, with leaves 1–8 cm long and flowers reddish-pink or purple.

This plant was previously classified under several genera, including Episcia and Nautilocalyx, before being reclassified in Chrysothemis.
