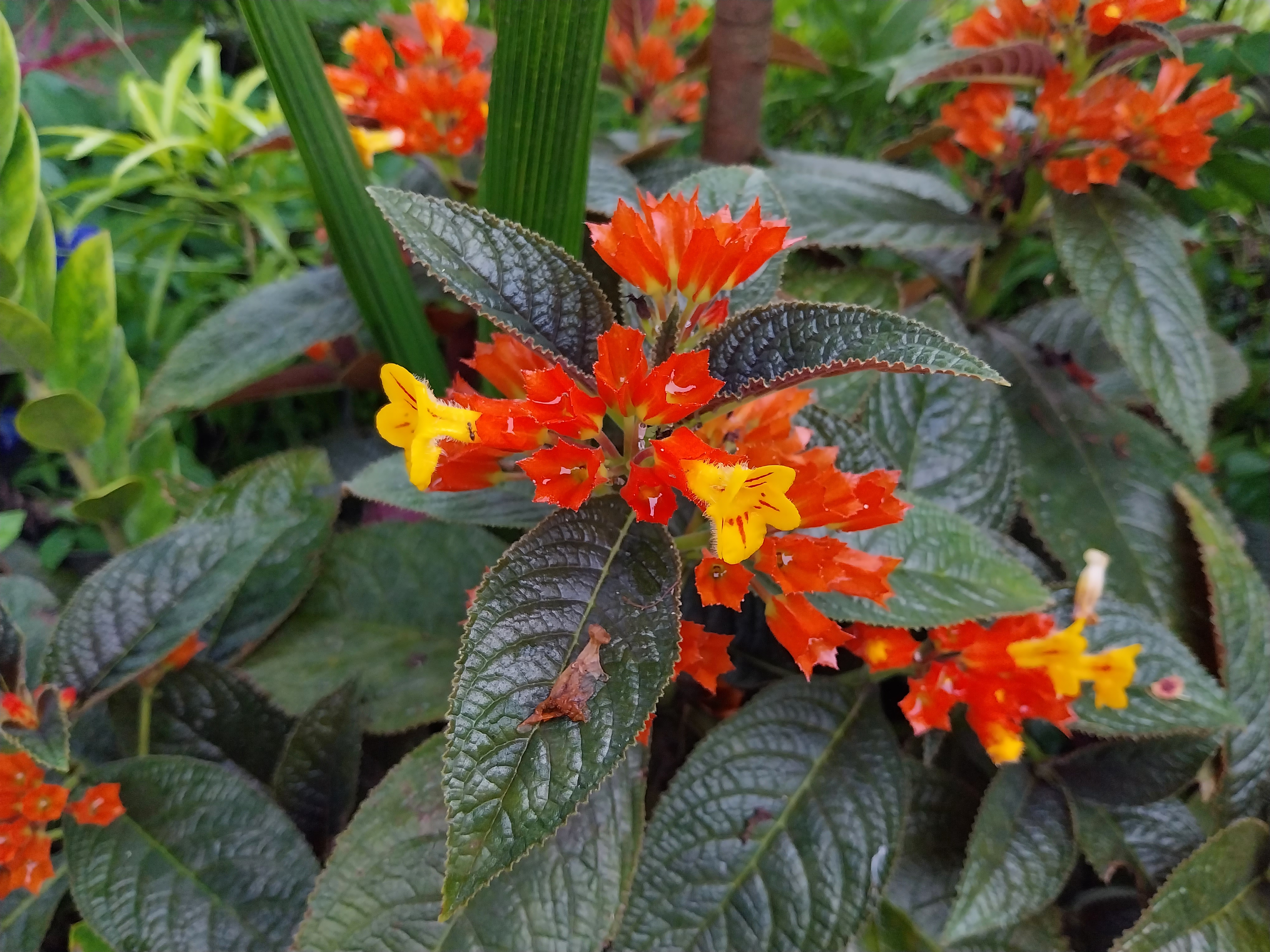

Conservation status
- Vulnerable (IUCN 3.1)

Scientific classification
- Kingdom: Plantae
- Clade: Tracheophytes
- Clade: Angiosperms
- Clade: Eudicots
- Clade: Asterids
- Order: Lamiales
- Family: Gesneriaceae
- Genus: Glossoloma
- Species: G. martinianum

Binomial name
- Glossoloma martinianum (J.F.Sm.) J.L.Clark

Synonyms
- Alloplectus martinianus J.F.Sm.

= Glossoloma martinianum =

Species of flowering plant

Glossoloma martinianum is a plant species in the Gesneriaceae family. A recent review has moved it out of the genus Alloplectus.

It is endemic to Ecuador. Its natural habitat is subtropical or tropical moist montane forests.
