= Neomortonia =

Scientific classification
- Kingdom: Plantae
- Clade: Tracheophytes
- Clade: Angiosperms
- Clade: Eudicots
- Clade: Asterids
- Order: Lamiales
- Family: Gesneriaceae
- Subfamily: Gesnerioideae
- Tribe: Gesnerieae
- Genus: Neomortonia; Wiehler
- Species: N. rosea

Binomial name
- Neomortonia rosea Wiehler

Synonyms
- Neomortonia alba Wiehler

Species of plant

Neomortonia is a monotypic genus of flowering plants belonging to the family Gesneriaceae. It just contains one species, Neomortonia rosea.

Its native range is Costa Rica to Ecuador. It is also found in Colombia and Panama.

The genus name of Neomortonia is in honour of Conrad Vernon Morton (1905–1972), an American botanist who did notable writings on Ferns. He was also a specialist in Gesneriaceae and Solanaceae for the Smithsonian Institution from 1928. The Latin specific epithet of rosea refers to being rose-like. Both the genus and the species were first described and published in Selbyana Vol.1 on page 17 in 1975.
