= Rufodorsia =

Scientific classification
- Kingdom: Plantae
- Clade: Tracheophytes
- Clade: Angiosperms
- Clade: Eudicots
- Clade: Asterids
- Order: Lamiales
- Family: Gesneriaceae
- Subfamily: Gesnerioideae
- Genus: Rufodorsia; Wiehler (1975)

Species
- 5; See text.

Synonyms
- Oerstedina Wiehler (1977)

Genus of flowering plants

Rufodorsia is a genus of epiphytic flowering plants in the family Gesneriaceae. The genus name refers to the reddish back of the upper lobes of the flower. It is native to montane cloud forest in Central America.

== Description ==
Rufodorsia species are epiphytic perennial plants, with little-branched upright or hanging stems. The leaves are opposite and of similar sizes with a leathery blade. The inflorescence is an axillary cyme with one to ten flowers. The flowers are short, with fused petals forming a bell shape. The free ends of the petals (lobes) differ: the lowest is larger, making the flower appear two-lipped. The flower is whitish, except for the back of the upper two lobes which is reddish. There are four stamens, included within the flower. The fruit is an almost translucent white berry with fleshy pulp.

== Taxonomy ==
The genus was erected by Hans Joachim Wiehler in 1975 for four species, three new and one originally described in the genus Besleria. The genus name is derived from Latin rufus 'red' and dorsum 'back', referring to the reddish back of the flowers.

Genus Oerstedina was erected in 1977, initially with two new species. The genus name honoured Anders Sandøe Ørsted, a Danish botanist who explored and collected in the neotropics between 1845 and 1848. Wiehler noted that Oerstedina was close to the genus Rufodorsia.

Molecular phylogenetic studies showed a sister relationship between Rufodorsia and Oerstedina, and in 2010, Ricardo Kriebel transferred one species from Oerstedina to Rufodorsia as Rufodorsia cerricola. Plants of the World Online treats Oerstedina as a synonym, and its former species have been placed in Rufodorsia.

=== Species ===
Four species were originally placed in the genus, and are recognized in a 2020 list of New World members of the family Gesneriaceae, as well as by Plants of the World Online as of April 2021:

- Rufodorsia congestiflora (Donn.Sm.) Wiehler
- Rufodorsia intermedia Wiehler
- Rufodorsia major Wiehler
- Rufodorsia minor Wiehler

One additional species transferred from Oerstedina is accepted by Plants of the World Online as of April 2021:

- Rufodorsia cerricola (Wiehler) Kriebel = Oerstedina cerricola Wiehler

== Distribution and habitat ==
The four original species of Rufodorsia are native to Central America, from Nicaragua through Costa Rica to Panama. They are found in montane cloud forest and sub-cloud forest at elevations of 450–1,500 m (1,500–4,900 ft), R. major at the lowest levels and R. congestiflora at the highest.
