= Goyazia =

Scientific classification
- Kingdom: Plantae
- Clade: Tracheophytes
- Clade: Angiosperms
- Clade: Eudicots
- Clade: Asterids
- Order: Lamiales
- Family: Gesneriaceae
- Subfamily: Gesnerioideae
- Tribe: Gesnerieae
- Subtribe: Gloxiniinae
- Genus: Goyazia; Taub.

Genus of plants

Goyazia is a genus of flowering plants belonging to the family Gesneriaceae.

Its native range is Brazil.

Species:

- Goyazia petraea (S.M.Phillips) Wiehler
- Goyazia rupicola Taub.
