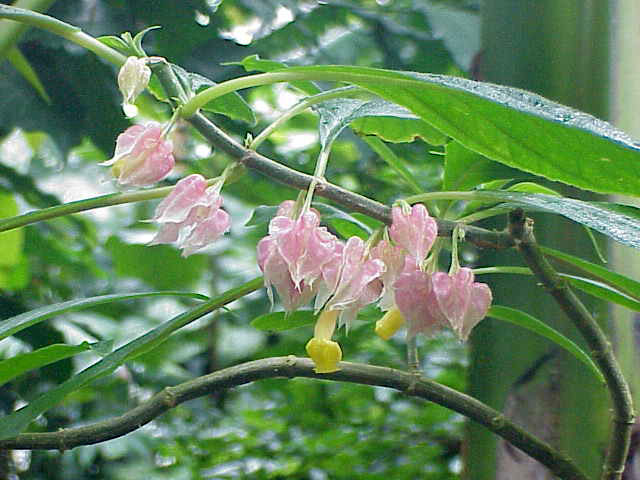
- Drymonia strigosa

Scientific classification
- Kingdom: Plantae
- Clade: Tracheophytes
- Clade: Angiosperms
- Clade: Eudicots
- Clade: Asterids
- Order: Lamiales
- Family: Gesneriaceae
- Subfamily: Gesnerioideae
- Genus: Drymonia; Mart. (1831)

Species
- 82; see text

Synonyms
- Anisoplectus Oerst. (1861); Calanthus Oerst. ex Hanst. (1861); Caloplectus Oerst. (1858); Erythranthus Oerst. ex Hanst. (1861); Macrochlamys Decne. (1849); Polythysania Hanst. (1854); Saccoplectus Oerst. (1858)

= Drymonia (plant) =

Genus of flowering plants

Drymonia is a genus of flowering plants in the family Gesneriaceae. It includes 82 species native to the tropical Americas, ranging from southern Mexico through Central America and northern South America to Bolivia and southeastern Brazil.

== Species ==
82 species are accepted.

- Drymonia aciculata Wiehler
- Drymonia affinis (Mansf.) Wiehler
- Drymonia alloplectoides Hanst.
- Drymonia ambonensis (L.E.Skog) J.L.Clark
- Drymonia anisophylla L.E.Skog & L.P.Kvist
- Drymonia antherocycla Leeuwenb.
- Drymonia atropurpurea Clavijo & J.L.Clark
- Drymonia betancurii Clavijo & J.L.Clark
- Drymonia brochidodroma Wiehler
- Drymonia candida Hanst.
- Drymonia chiribogana Wiehler
- Drymonia coccinea (Aubl.) Wiehler
- Drymonia collegarum J.L.Clark & J.R.Clark
- Drymonia conchocalyx Hanst.
- Drymonia coriacea (Oerst. ex Hanst.) Wiehler
- Drymonia crassa C.V.Morton
- Drymonia crenatiloba (Mansf.) Wiehler
- Drymonia crispa Clavijo & J.L.Clark
- Drymonia croatii Clavijo, Zuluaga & J.L.Clark
- Drymonia decora J.R.Clark & J.L.Clark
- Drymonia dodsonii (Wiehler) J.L.Clark
- Drymonia doratostyla (Leeuwenb.) Wiehler
- Drymonia dressleri Wiehler
- Drymonia droseroides J.L.Clark & Clavijo
- Drymonia ecuadorensis Wiehler
- Drymonia erythroloma (Leeuwenb.) Wiehler
- Drymonia fimbriata C.V.Morton
- Drymonia flavida L.E.Skog
- Drymonia foliacea (Rusby) Wiehler
- Drymonia folsomii L.E.Skog
- Drymonia glandulosa Kriebel
- Drymonia guatemalensis (C.V.Morton) D.N.Gibson
- Drymonia hansteiniana Wiehler
- Drymonia hoppii (Mansf.) Wiehler
- Drymonia ignea J.L.Clark
- Drymonia intermedia Clavijo & J.L.Clark
- Drymonia killipii Wiehler
- Drymonia laciniosa Wiehler
- Drymonia lanceolata (Hanst.) C.V.Morton
- Drymonia latifolia (Rusby) Rodr.-Flores & L.E.Skog
- Drymonia longiflora Clavijo & J.L.Clark
- Drymonia macrantha (Donn.Sm.) D.N.Gibson
- Drymonia macrophylla (Oerst.) H.E.Moore
- Drymonia mexicana Clavijo & J.L.Clark
- Drymonia microcalyx Wiehler
- Drymonia microphylla Wiehler
- Drymonia mortoniana Wiehler
- Drymonia multiflora (Oerst.) Wiehler
- Drymonia oinochrophylla (Donn.Sm.) D.N.Gibson
- Drymonia ovatifolia J.L.Clark
- Drymonia oxysepala Leeuwenb.
- Drymonia parviflora Hanst.
- Drymonia peltata (Oliv.) H.E.Moore
- Drymonia pendula (Poepp.) Wiehler
- Drymonia peponifera J.L.Clark & Clavijo
- Drymonia pilifera Wiehler
- Drymonia psila D.N.Gibson
- Drymonia psilocalyx Leeuwenb.
- Drymonia pudica L.E.Skog & Steyerm.
- Drymonia pulchra Wiehler
- Drymonia punctulata Wiehler
- Drymonia rhodoloma Wiehler
- Drymonia rubra C.V.Morton
- Drymonia rubripilosa Kriebel
- Drymonia semicordata (Poepp.) Wiehler
- Drymonia serrulata (Jacq.) Mart.
- Drymonia solitaria (Rusby) Wiehler
- Drymonia squamosa Clavijo & J.L.Clark
- Drymonia stenophylla (Donn.Sm.) H.E.Moore
- Drymonia strigosa (Oerst.) Wiehler
- Drymonia submarginalis Gómez-Laur. & Chavarría
- Drymonia sulphurea Wiehler
- Drymonia tenuis (Benth.) J.L.Clark
- Drymonia teuscheri (Raymond) J.L.Clark
- Drymonia tolimensis Wiehler
- Drymonia tomentulifera Kriebel
- Drymonia turrialvae Hanst.
- Drymonia uninerva Wiehler
- Drymonia urceolata Wiehler
- Drymonia utuanensis Wiehler
- Drymonia variegata L.Uribe
- Drymonia warszewicziana Hanst.
