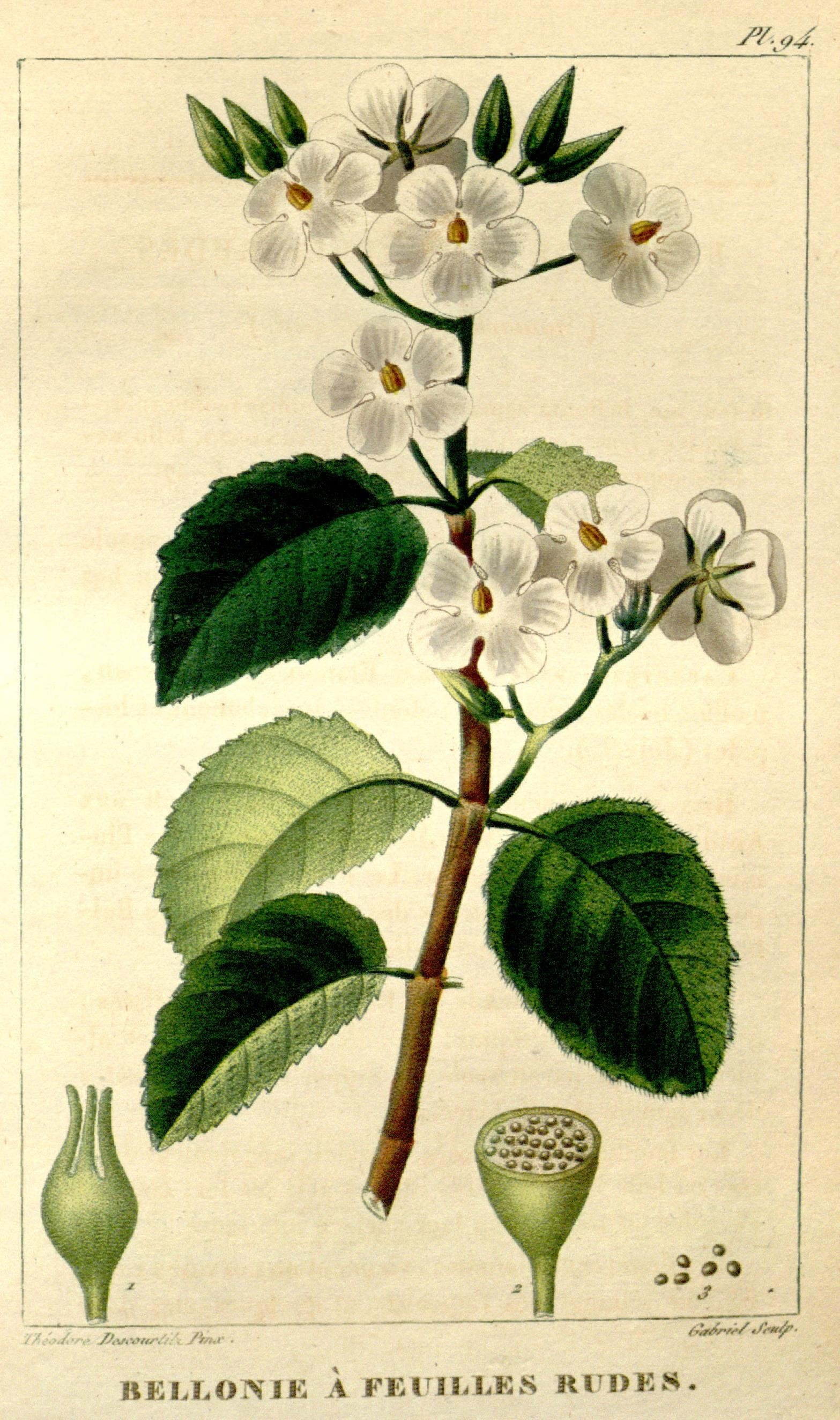
- Bellonia aspera botanical illustration

Scientific classification
- Kingdom: Plantae
- Clade: Tracheophytes
- Clade: Angiosperms
- Clade: Eudicots
- Clade: Asterids
- Order: Lamiales
- Family: Gesneriaceae
- Subfamily: Gesnerioideae
- Genus: Bellonia; L.

Species
- See text

= Bellonia =

Genus of Gesneriaceae plants

Bellonia is a genus of flowering plants in the family Gesneriaceae, native to Cuba and Hispaniola. They have floral characters suggesting that they are buzz pollinated.

== Species ==
Currently accepted species include:

- Bellonia aspera L. – Hispaniola
- Bellonia spinosa Sw. – Cuba and Hispaniola
