= Cobananthus =

Scientific classification
- Kingdom: Plantae
- Clade: Tracheophytes
- Clade: Angiosperms
- Clade: Eudicots
- Clade: Asterids
- Order: Lamiales
- Family: Gesneriaceae
- Subfamily: Gesnerioideae
- Genus: Cobananthus; Wiehler
- Species: C. calochlamys

Binomial name
- Cobananthus calochlamys (Donn.Sm.) Wiehler

Synonyms
- Alloplectus calochlamys Donn.Sm.; Columnea calochlamys (Donn.Sm.) C.V.Morton

Genus of flowering plants

Cobananthus is a genus of flowering plants in the family Gesneriaceae, with a single species Cobananthus calochlamys. It is a subshrub native to southern Mexico (Chiapas) and Guatemala. It is sometimes included in the genus Alloplectus, but molecular phylogenetic studies suggest that the two genera are not closely related, with Cobananthus more closely related to Alsobia.
