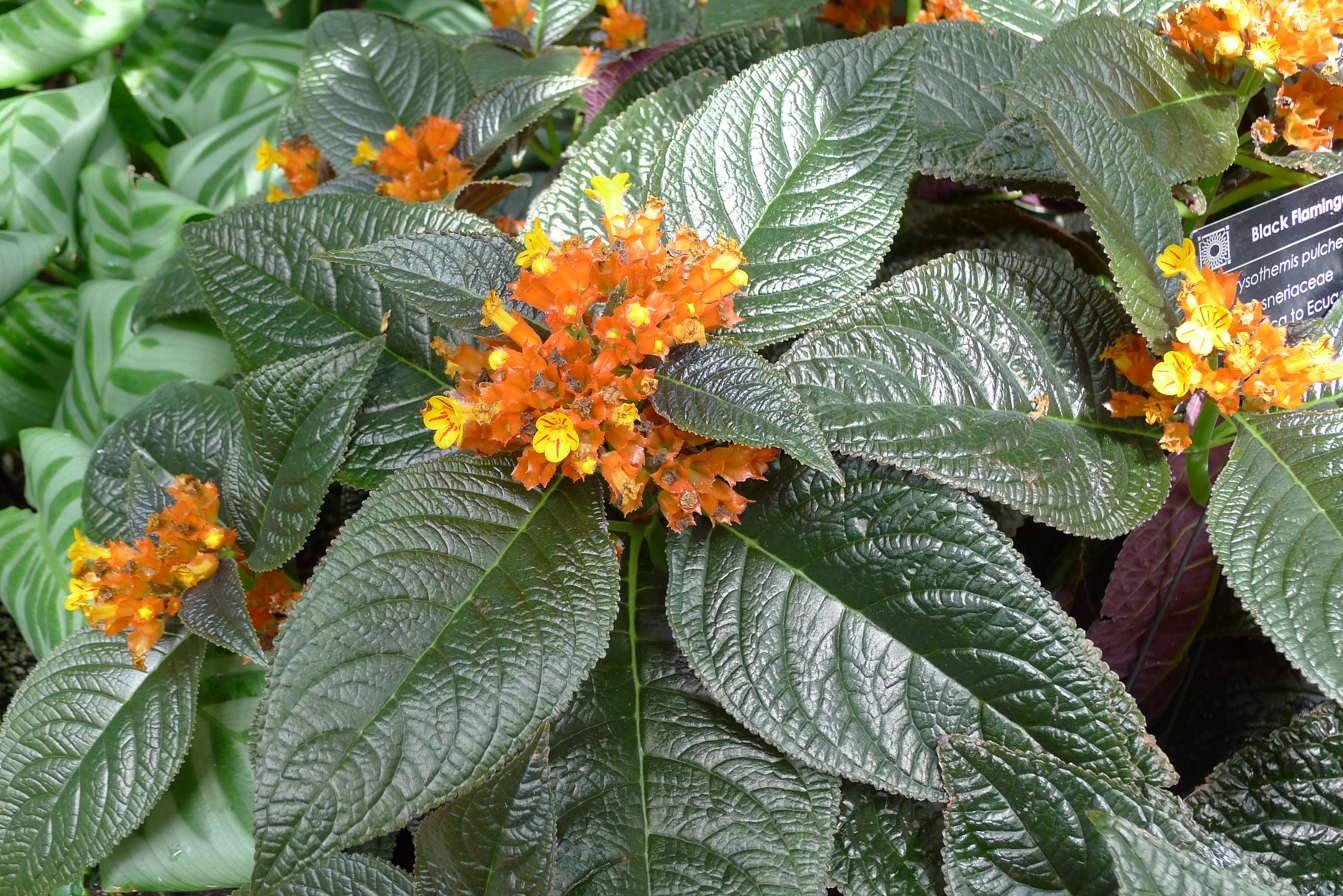
- Chrysothemis pulchella

Scientific classification
- Kingdom: Plantae
- Clade: Tracheophytes
- Clade: Angiosperms
- Clade: Eudicots
- Clade: Asterids
- Order: Lamiales
- Family: Gesneriaceae
- Genus: Chrysothemis; Decne. (1849)

Synonyms
- Skiophila Hanst. (1854); Tussacia Rchb. ex Benth. (1846), nom. illeg.

= Chrysothemis (plant) =

Genus of flowering plants

Chrysothemis is a genus of flowering plants in the family Gesneriaceae. It includes nine species native to the tropical Americas, ranging from southern Mexico and Cuba through Central America and northern South America to central Brazil.

== Species ==
Nine species are accepted.

- Chrysothemis adenosiphon (Leeuwenb.) M.M.Mora & J.L.Clark
- Chrysothemis colonensis (Wiehler) M.M.Mora & J.L.Clark
- Chrysothemis dichroa Leeuwenb.
- Chrysothemis friedrichsthaliana (Hanst.) H.E.Moore
- Chrysothemis kuhlmannii Hoehne
- Chrysothemis melittifolia (L.) M.M.Mora & J.L.Clark
- Chrysothemis panamensis (Seem.) M.M.Mora & J.L.Clark
- Chrysothemis pulchella (Donn ex Sims) Decne.
- Chrysothemis rupestris (Benth.) Leeuwenb.
