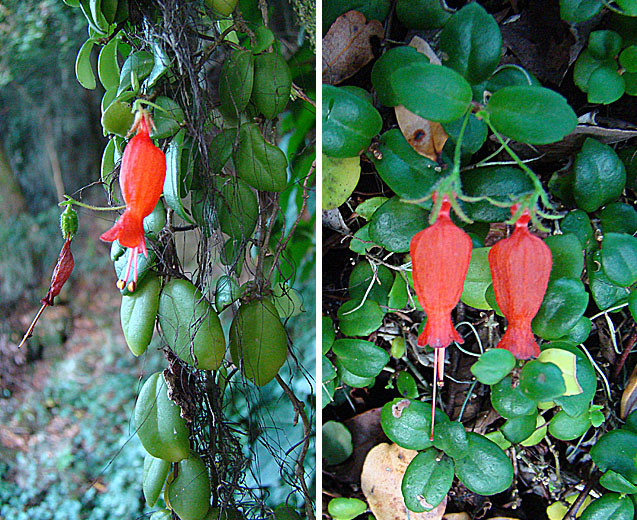
- Sarmienta scandens

Scientific classification
- Kingdom: Plantae
- Clade: Embryophytes
- Clade: Tracheophytes
- Clade: Spermatophytes
- Clade: Angiosperms
- Clade: Eudicots
- Clade: Asterids
- Order: Lamiales
- Family: Gesneriaceae
- Genus: Sarmienta; Ruiz & Pav. (1794), nom. cons.
- Species: S. scandens

Binomial name
- Sarmienta scandens (J.D. Brandis) Pers. (1805)

Synonyms
- Sarmienta repens Ruiz & Pav. (1798); Urceolaria chilensis Molina (1810); Urceolaria scandens J.D.Brandis (1786)

= Sarmienta =

Genus of flowering plants

Sarmienta scandens, the Chilean pitcher flower, is a species of flowering plant, and the sole member of its genus within the family Gesneriaceae. It is an epiphyte native to the cool temperate rainforest of southern and central Chile.

The Latin specific epithet scandens means "climbing".

== Description ==
Reaching just 10 cm (3.9 in) tall by 50 cm (20 in) broad, it is a creeping evergreen perennial with small oval leaves and pendant scarlet pitcher-shaped flowers in summer.

== Cultivation ==
In temperate regions it is usually grown under glass, either epiphytically or using a specialist potting medium containing leaf mould or sphagnum moss. It may be placed outside during the summer months, in a warm sheltered spot where the temperature does not fall below 5 °C (41 °F). It may however survive brief periods down to 0 °C (32 °F).

The plant is still widely advertised as Sarmienta repens, a name which is now regarded as illegitimate.

Sarmienta scandens has gained the Royal Horticultural Society's Award of Garden Merit.
