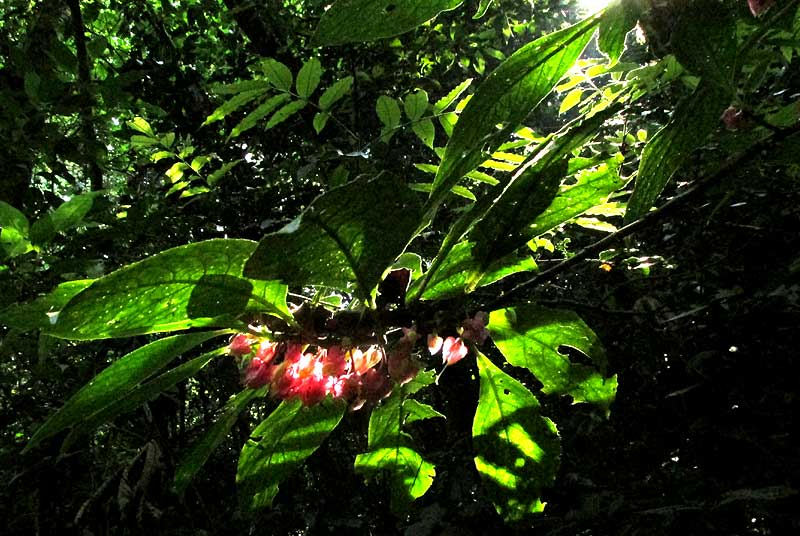
- Flowering plant in cloud forest habitat, San Andrés Tuxtla, Veracruz, Mexico

Scientific classification
- Kingdom: Plantae
- Clade: Embryophytes
- Clade: Tracheophytes
- Clade: Spermatophytes
- Clade: Angiosperms
- Clade: Eudicots
- Clade: Asterids
- Order: Lamiales
- Family: Gesneriaceae
- Genus: Drymonia
- Species: D. strigosa

Binomial name
- Drymonia strigosa (Oerst.) Wiehler

Synonyms
- Alloplectus strigosus (Oerst.) Hanst.; Crantzia strigosa (Oerst.) Fritsch; Saccoplectus strigosus Oerst.; Columnea hansteiniana Kuntze

= Drymonia strigosa =

Species of plant

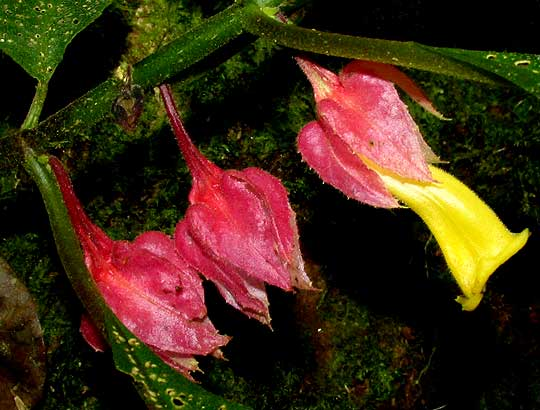
Flowers

Drymonia strigosa, is a species of tree-dwelling plant found only in southern Mexico. It belongs to the mostly tropical and subtropical family Gesneriaceae.

== Description ==
The following field marks help to distinguish Drymonia strigosa from similar species:

- It is an epiphyte somewhat covered with straight, stiff hairs, or trichomes, all pointing in more or less the same direction ("strigose" hairs). Its stems are up to 1.2 m (3 ft 11 in) long which uses other plants and objects for support, and leans outward toward light.
- Leaves with petioles up to 5.5 cm (2 in) long arising in pairs opposite one another are elliptic in shape and up to 28 cm (11 in) long and 8.5 cm (3 1/2 in) wide. Margins bear 16-30 short teeth. There are 5-7 secondary veins.
- Flowers arise where leaves connect to stems, on pedicels up to 2.5 cm (1 in) long, and appear singly or in groups of 2-3. Calyces are reddish, up to 3.5 cm (1 1/2 in) long and 1.5 cm (1/2 in) wide, and bulge at the base. Corollas up to 4.5 cm (2 in) long and 1.5 cm (1/2 in) wide, are yellow, tubular, more or less irregular in shape, and narrowing at the base.
- Capsular-type fruits are egg-shaped, reddish and translucent when mature, bearing remains of the calyx at their tips.

== Distribution ==
Drymonia strigosa is endemic just to the southern Mexican states of Chiapas, Guerrero, Jalisco and Veracruz.

== Habitat ==
Drymonia strigosa grows on trunks and branches of various tree species, around 1 to 15 m (3 ft 3 in to 49 ft 3 in) off the ground, in cloud forests, tropical forests with semi-deciduous leaves, and gallery forests beside bodies of water, at elevations of 150–1,200 m (490–3,940 ft).

== In cultivation ==
Drymonia strigosa is sold commercially as a potted plant. It should be grown in bright, filtered light such as near an east-facing window or under canopy shade, at temperatures ranging from 12–26 °C (54–79 °F), with high humidity. Soil should be well drained and humus-rich, such as a mix of peat and perlite, with a slightly acid pH. The plant should be fed monthly with a dilute, balanced fertilizer. It does well in terrariums and greenhouses.

== Conservation status ==
A preliminary study based on where the species occurs -- 312 km^{2} (120 sq mi) -- indicates that Drymonia strigosa is in danger of facing extinction (EN), according to IUCN criteria B2b(iii)c(ii).

== Pollination dynamics ==
In flowers of Drymonia strigosa, morphology and nectar production encourage pollination by birds, while the flowers' anthers release pollen through pores, which is associated with bee pollination. Hummingbirds are the most frequent visitors, and stingless bees are frequent nectar robbers. Stingless bees were observed chewing holes at corolla bases to access the nectar. Relative to these observations is the finding that the association of hummingbird pollination with constricted corolla tubes such as seen in Drymonia strigosa suggests that the narrowing evolved as a barrier mechanism that prohibits the visitation of flowers by bees.

== Taxonomy ==
In 1858 Drymonia strigosa was formally named and described under the basionym Saccoplectus strigosus by Anders Sandøe Ørsted.

== Etymology ==
The genus name Drymonia is derived from the Greek δρυμος, drymos, meaning "wood," an allusion to species of the genus growing on trees.

The species name strigosa is based on the Latin striga meaning "row of bristles." The technical term "strigose" means "having appressed bristles or scales," which is the case of the body of Drymonia strigosa.
