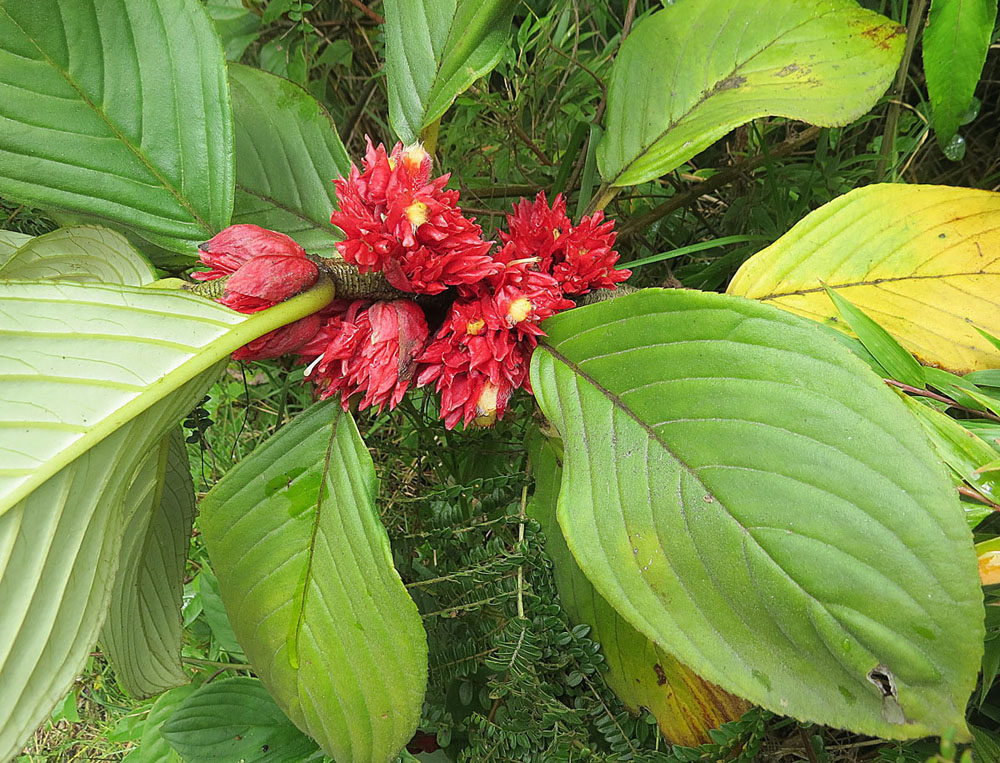
- Glossoloma ichthyoderma

Scientific classification
- Kingdom: Plantae
- Clade: Tracheophytes
- Clade: Angiosperms
- Clade: Eudicots
- Clade: Asterids
- Order: Lamiales
- Family: Gesneriaceae
- Genus: Glossoloma; Hanst. (1853)

= Glossoloma =

Genus of flowering plants

Glossoloma is a genus of Neotropical plants in the family Gesneriaceae. It includes 20 species which range from southern Mexico to Bolivia. The species in the genus were formerly placed in Alloplectus. They are subshrubs with the leaves clustered at the ends of branches, and tubular flowers.

== Species ==
30 species are accepted.

- Glossoloma altescandens (Mansf.) J.L.Clark
- Glossoloma anomalum J.L.Clark
- Glossoloma baguense (L.E.Skog) J.L.Clark
- Glossoloma bicolor (Kunth) J.L.Clark
- Glossoloma bolivianum (Britton ex Rusby) J.L.Clark
- Glossoloma carpishense (J.L.Clark & I.Salinas) J.L.Clark
- Glossoloma chrysanthum (Planch. & Linden) J.L.Clark
- Glossoloma cucullatum (C.V.Montin) J.L.Clark
- Glossoloma grandicalyx (J.L.Clark & L.E.Skog) J.L.Clark
- Glossoloma harlequinoides J.L.Clark
- Glossoloma herthae (Mansf.) J.L.Clark
- Glossoloma ichthyoderma (Hanst.) J.L.Clark
- Glossoloma magenticristatum J.L.Clark, D.Hoyos & Clavijo
- Glossoloma martinianum (J.F.Sm.) J.L.Clark
- Glossoloma medusaeum (L.E.Skog) J.L.Clark
- Glossoloma oblongicalyx (J.L.Clark & L.E.Skog) J.L.Clark
- Glossoloma panamense (C.V.Morton) J.L.Clark
- Glossoloma pedunculatum J.L.Clark
- Glossoloma penduliflorum (M.Freiberg) J.L.Clark
- Glossoloma purpureum (L.P.Kvist & L.E.Skog) J.L.Clark
- Glossoloma pycnosuzygium (Donn.Sm.) J.L.Clark
- Glossoloma scandens J.L.Clark
- Glossoloma schultzei (Mansf.) J.L.Clark
- Glossoloma serpens (J.L.Clark & L.E.Skog) J.L.Clark
- Glossoloma sprucei (Kuntze) J.L.Clark
- Glossoloma subglabrum J.L.Clark
- Glossoloma tetragonoides (Mansf.) J.L.Clark
- Glossoloma tetragonum Hanst.
- Glossoloma velutinum J.L.Clark & Rodas
- Glossoloma wiehleri J.L.Clark & Tobar
