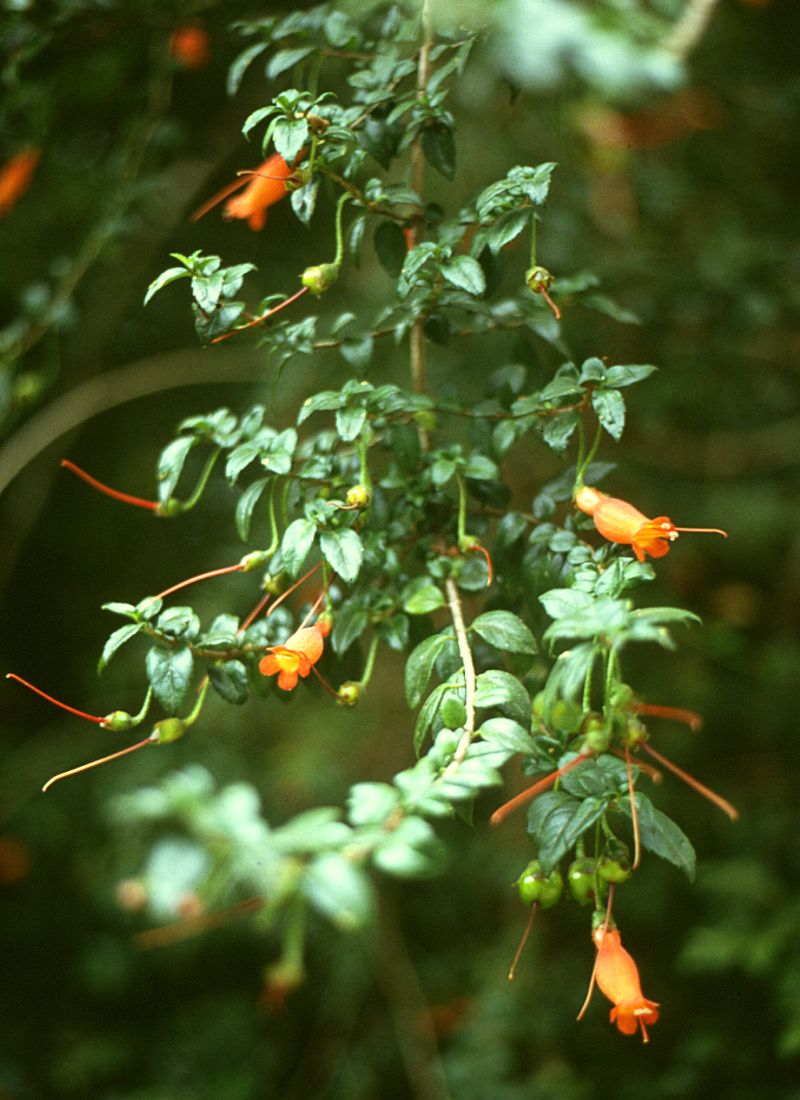
- Mitraria coccinea

Scientific classification
- Kingdom: Plantae
- Clade: Embryophytes
- Clade: Tracheophytes
- Clade: Angiosperms
- Clade: Eudicots
- Clade: Asterids
- Order: Lamiales
- Family: Gesneriaceae
- Genus: Mitraria; Cav. (1801)
- Species: M. coccinea

Binomial name
- Mitraria coccinea Cav. (1801)

Synonyms
- Diplocalyx C.Presl; Diplocalyx pallidus C.Presl (1845); Diplocalyx tomentellus C.Presl (1845); Gesneria chilensis Molina (1810); Mitraria pallida (C.Presl) Hanst. (1865); Mitraria tomentella (C.Presl) Hanst. (1865)

= Mitraria =

Genus of flowering plants

Mitraria is a genus of flowering plants in the family Gesneriaceae, comprising the sole species Mitraria coccinea (Chilean mitre flower).

It is a woody climbing plant, distributed across Central and South Chile and South Argentina.

It is cultivated as a garden plant in cool, moist areas, scrambling over the ground and climbing trees to 25 feet (7.6 m) at Arduaine Garden in Argyll, Scotland. The very attractive scarlet-orange tubular flowers are borne in late spring and summer.
