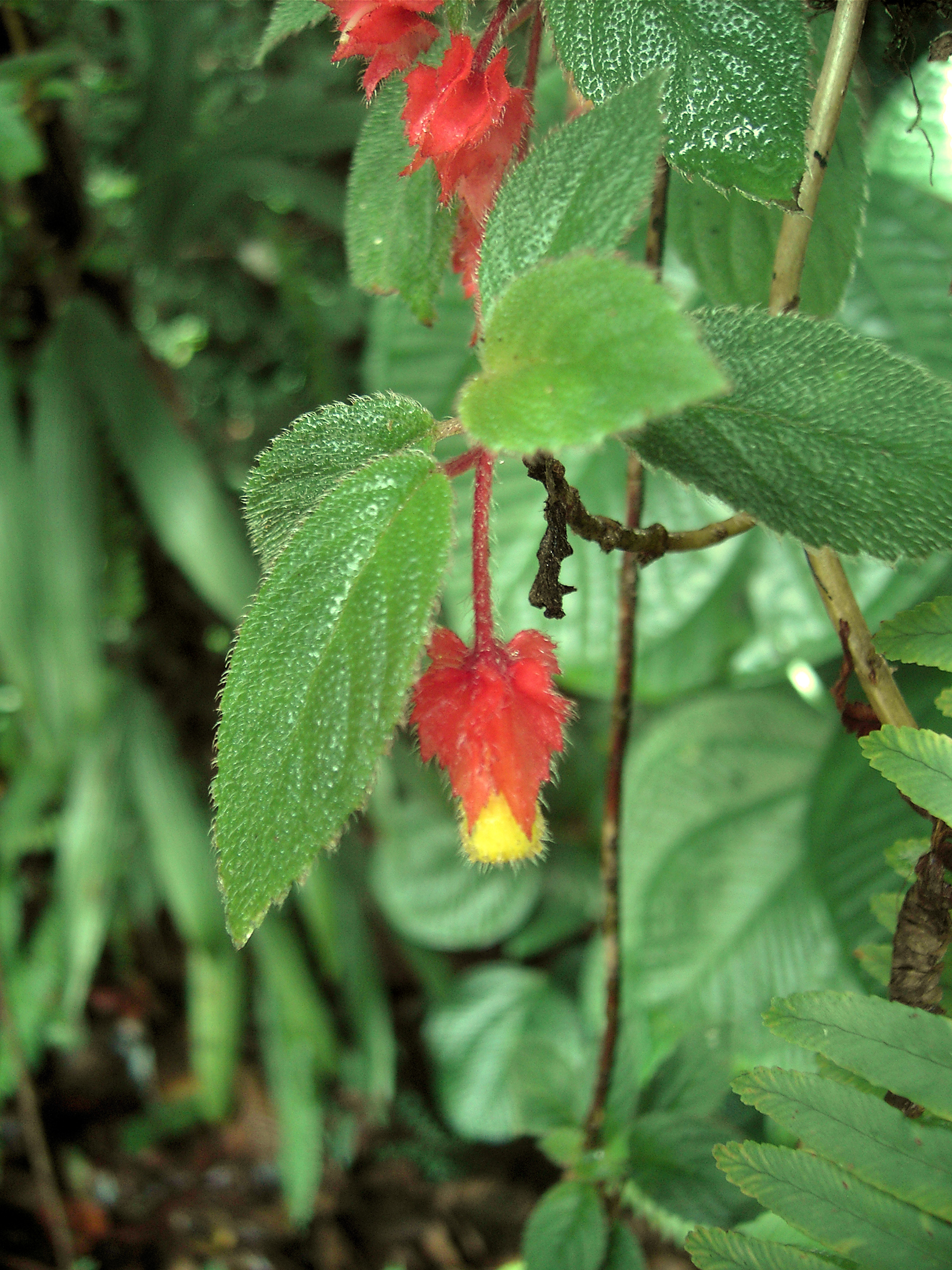
- Close-up of Crantzia cristata in bloom

Scientific classification
- Kingdom: Plantae
- Clade: Tracheophytes
- Clade: Angiosperms
- Clade: Eudicots
- Clade: Asterids
- Order: Lamiales
- Family: Gesneriaceae
- Genus: Crantzia; Scop.

Species
- Crantzia cristata (L.) Scop.; Crantzia tigrina (H.Karst.) Fritsch

Synonyms
- Lophia Desv. (1825); Lophalix Raf. (1838); Heintzia Karst. (1848); Prionoplectus Oerst. (1858)

= Crantzia =

Genus of flowering plants

Crantzia is a plant genus in the family Gesneriaceae. Crantzia species grow in damp or wet forests, mostly on Caribbean islands. Some are epiphytes, others are subshrubs or herbaceous plants with fibrous roots.

Several taxa from the Gesneriaceae genus Alloplectus have been reclassified as Crantzia.

Giovanni Antonio Scopoli named the genus after botanist and physician Heinrich Johann Nepomuk von Crantz (1722–1799).
