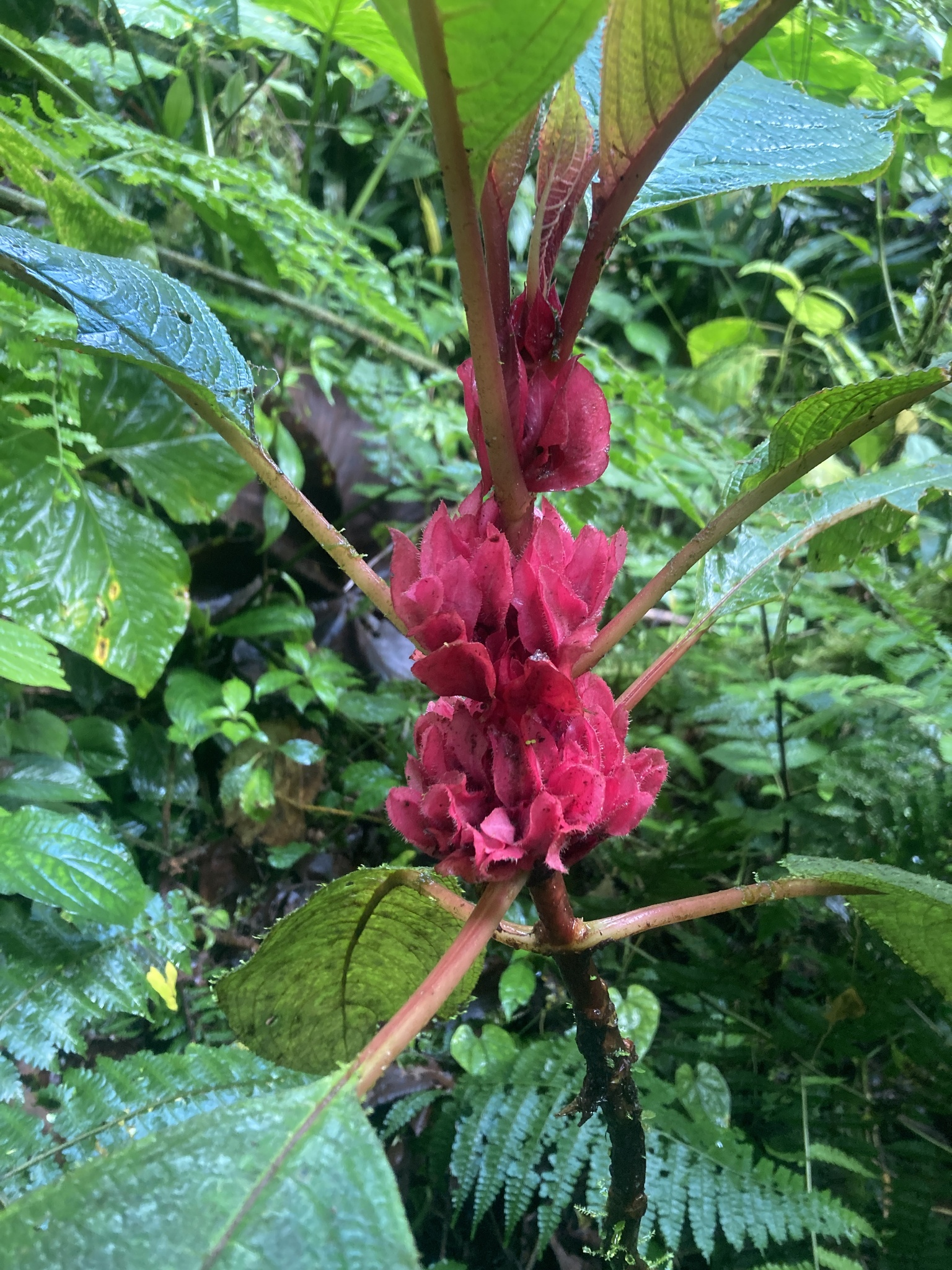

Scientific classification
- Kingdom: Plantae
- Clade: Tracheophytes
- Clade: Angiosperms
- Clade: Eudicots
- Clade: Asterids
- Order: Lamiales
- Family: Gesneriaceae
- Genus: Drymonia
- Species: D. crenatiloba

Binomial name
- Drymonia crenatiloba (Mansf.) Wiehler (1981)

Synonyms
- Alloplectus crenatilobus Mansf. (1938)

= Drymonia crenatiloba =

Species of plant

Drymonia crenatiloba is a species of flowering plant in the genus Drymonia that is native to Ecuador.
