= Amalophyllon ecuadoranum =

Conservation status
- Vulnerable (IUCN 3.1)

Scientific classification
- Kingdom: Plantae
- Clade: Tracheophytes
- Clade: Angiosperms
- Clade: Eudicots
- Clade: Asterids
- Order: Lamiales
- Family: Gesneriaceae
- Genus: Amalophyllon
- Species: A. ecuadoranum

Binomial name
- Amalophyllon ecuadoranum (Wiehler) J.L.Clark (2011)

Synonyms
- Phinaea ecuadorana Wiehler (1995)

Species of flowering plant

Amalophyllon ecuadoranum is a species of plant in the family Gesneriaceae. It is endemic to Ecuador. Its natural habitat is tropical moist montane forests from 500 to 1,000 meters elevation.

The species was first described as Phinaea ecuadorana by Hans Wiehler in 1995. In 2011 it was placed in genus Amalophyllon as A. ecuadoranum.
