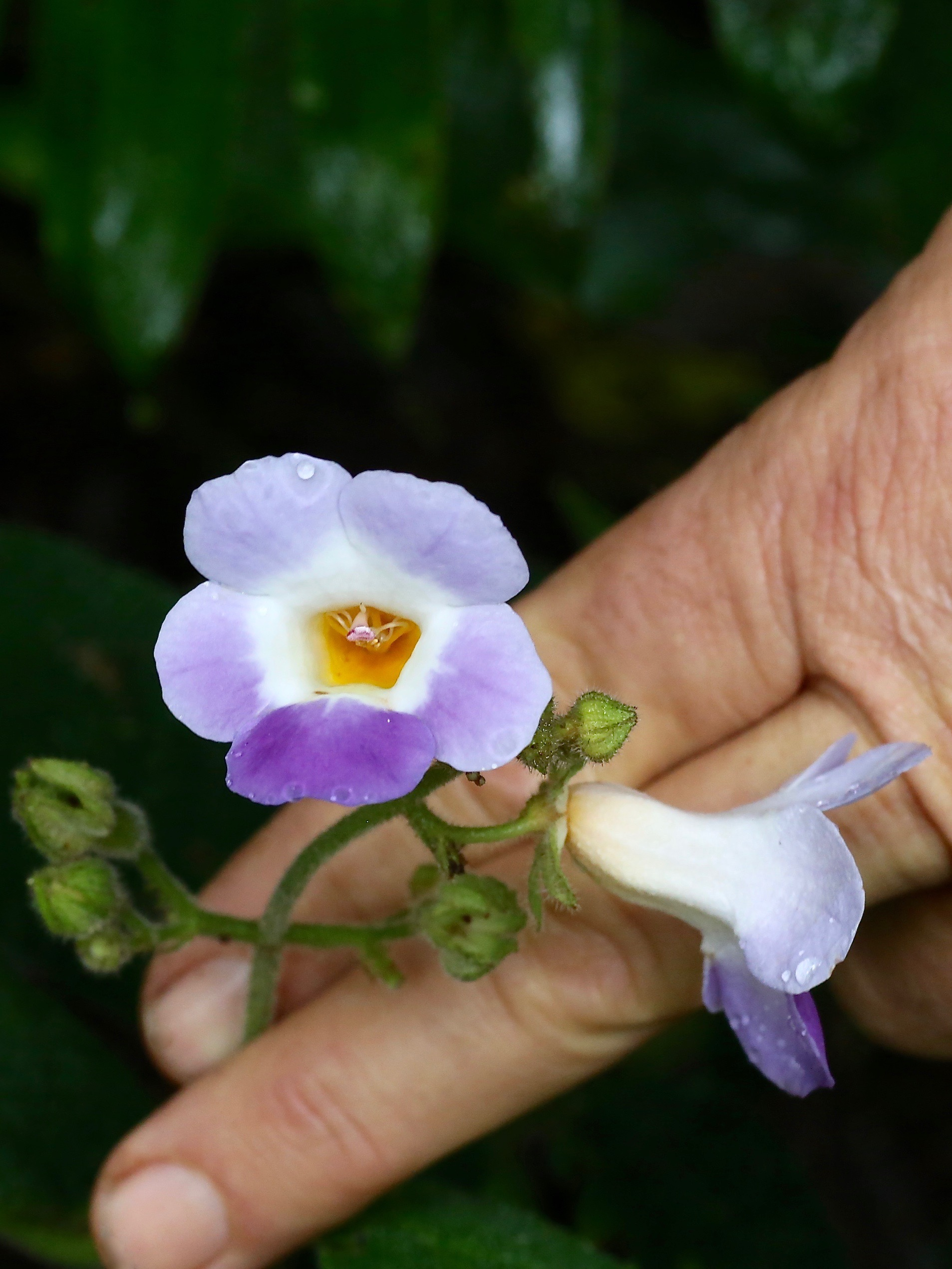
- Monopyle macrocarpa

Scientific classification
- Kingdom: Plantae
- Clade: Tracheophytes
- Clade: Angiosperms
- Clade: Eudicots
- Clade: Asterids
- Order: Lamiales
- Family: Gesneriaceae
- Genus: Monopyle; Moritz ex Benth. & Hook.f. (1876)

Species
- 25; see text

Synonyms
- Scoliotheca Baill. (1888)

= Monopyle =

Genus of flowering plants

Monopyle is a genus of plants in the family Gesneriaceae.

Its native range extends from south-eastern Mexico to southern Tropical America. It is found in the countries of Bolivia, Brazil, Colombia, Costa Rica, Ecuador, Guatemala, Mexico, Panamá, Peru and Venezuela.

== Species ==
25 species are accepted.

- Monopyle angustifolia Fritsch
- Monopyle aurea Keene & J.L.Clark
- Monopyle chocoensis Keene & J.L.Clark
- Monopyle connata J.L.Clark & Keene
- Monopyle ecuadorensis C.V.Morton
- Monopyle flava L.E.Skog
- Monopyle glutinosa J.L.Clark & Keene
- Monopyle grandiflora Wiehler
- Monopyle inaequalis C.V.Morton
- Monopyle iserniana Cuatrec.
- Monopyle lilacina (Lem.) L.E.Skog, Barrie & Boggan
- Monopyle longicarpa J.L.Clark & Keene
- Monopyle macrocarpa Benth.
- Monopyle maxonii C.V.Morton
- Monopyle mexiae C.V.Morton
- Monopyle multiflora Keene & J.L.Clark
- Monopyle panamensis C.V.Morton
- Monopyle paniculata Benth.
- Monopyle puberula C.V.Morton
- Monopyle reflexa (Rusby) Roalson & Boggan
- Monopyle sodiroana Fritsch
- Monopyle stenoloba C.V.Morton
- Monopyle subdimidiata (Klotzsch & Hanst.) Mansf.
- Monopyle subsessilis Benth.
- Monopyle uniflora J.L.Clark & Keene
