= Conrad Vernon Morton =

American botanist

Conrad Vernon Morton (24 October 1905 – 29 July 1972) was an American botanist, who did notable writings on ferns. He was also a specialist in Gesneriaceae and Solanaceae for the Smithsonian Institution from 1928.

In 1938, botanists Standl. & Steyerm., published Mortoniodendron, a genus of flowering plants from Central America, belonging to the family Malvaceae in Conrad Morton's honour. Then in 1939, botanist Robert Everard Woodson published Mortoniella a monotypic genus of flowering plants from Central America, in the family Apocynaceae, also in his honour. Later in 1975, botanist Wiehler published Neomortonia, a genus of flowering plant from South America, belonging to the family Gesneriaceae.

== Publications ==
- Studies of fern types (Smithsonian Institution Press, Washington, two volumes, 1967–1973).
- A revision of the Argentine species of Solanum (Academia Nacional de Ciencias, Córdoba, Argentine, 1976).
