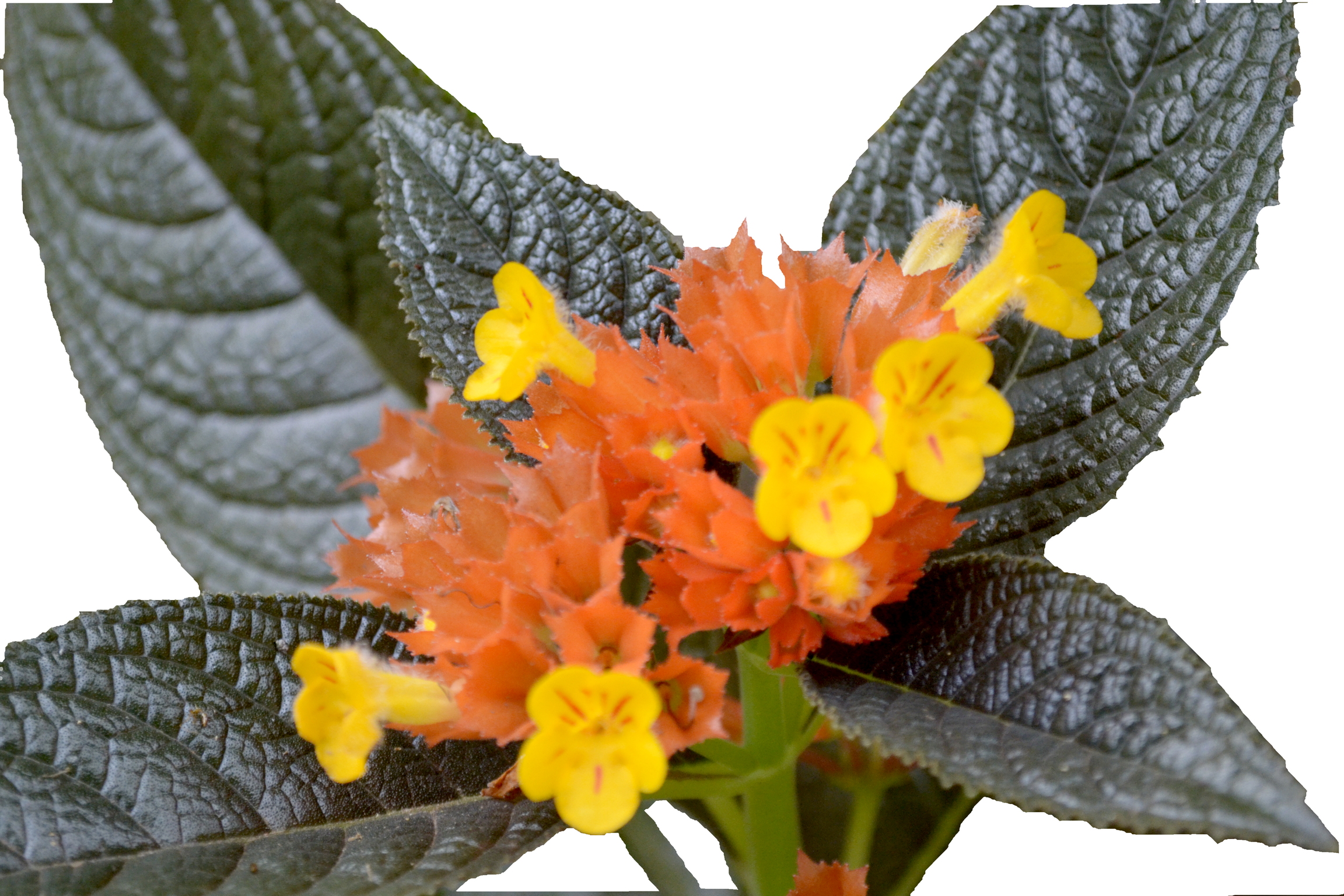

Scientific classification
- Kingdom: Plantae
- Clade: Tracheophytes
- Clade: Angiosperms
- Clade: Eudicots
- Clade: Asterids
- Order: Lamiales
- Family: Gesneriaceae
- Genus: Chrysothemis
- Species: C. pulchella

Binomial name
- Chrysothemis pulchella (Donn ex Sims) Decne.

= Chrysothemis pulchella =

Species of flowering plant

Chrysothemis pulchella (also known as sunset bells, black flamingo, copper leaf or simply chryothemis) is a tender tropical perennial plant that belongs to the family Gesneriaceae. It can be used as a shade area house plant or interior ornamental plant or in a greenhouse.

== Growth ==
During spring to summer, the plant blooms with very showy orange-red flowers. The bright yellow corolla, with some red stripes or spots, is about twice the length of the calyx, with a narrow tube and flaring lobes. The corolla is short-lived, lasting only a day or two, but the colored calyx is very long-lasting and decorative. Leaves are large, dark-green with brown touch and very ornamental. The thick and succulent stems are usually grown upright. The flowers are formed densely together as a bunch of foliage.

The plant has tubers at the base of the stem, and sometimes also in the leaf axils. The tubers get dormant if temperature gets too low. Below certain temperature, the leaves and stem vanish and the dormant tubers starts to regrow the plant later when the right weather appears.

Copper leaf prefers filtered light and requires regular watering to ensure constant moisture in the soil.

Chrysothemis is a genus of about six species. The name originates from Greek mythology. Chrysothemis was a daughter of Clytemnestra and Agamemnon. Among its genus, Chrysothemis pulchella (beautiful) is the most widespread species, the most variable, and the one found most often in cultivation.
