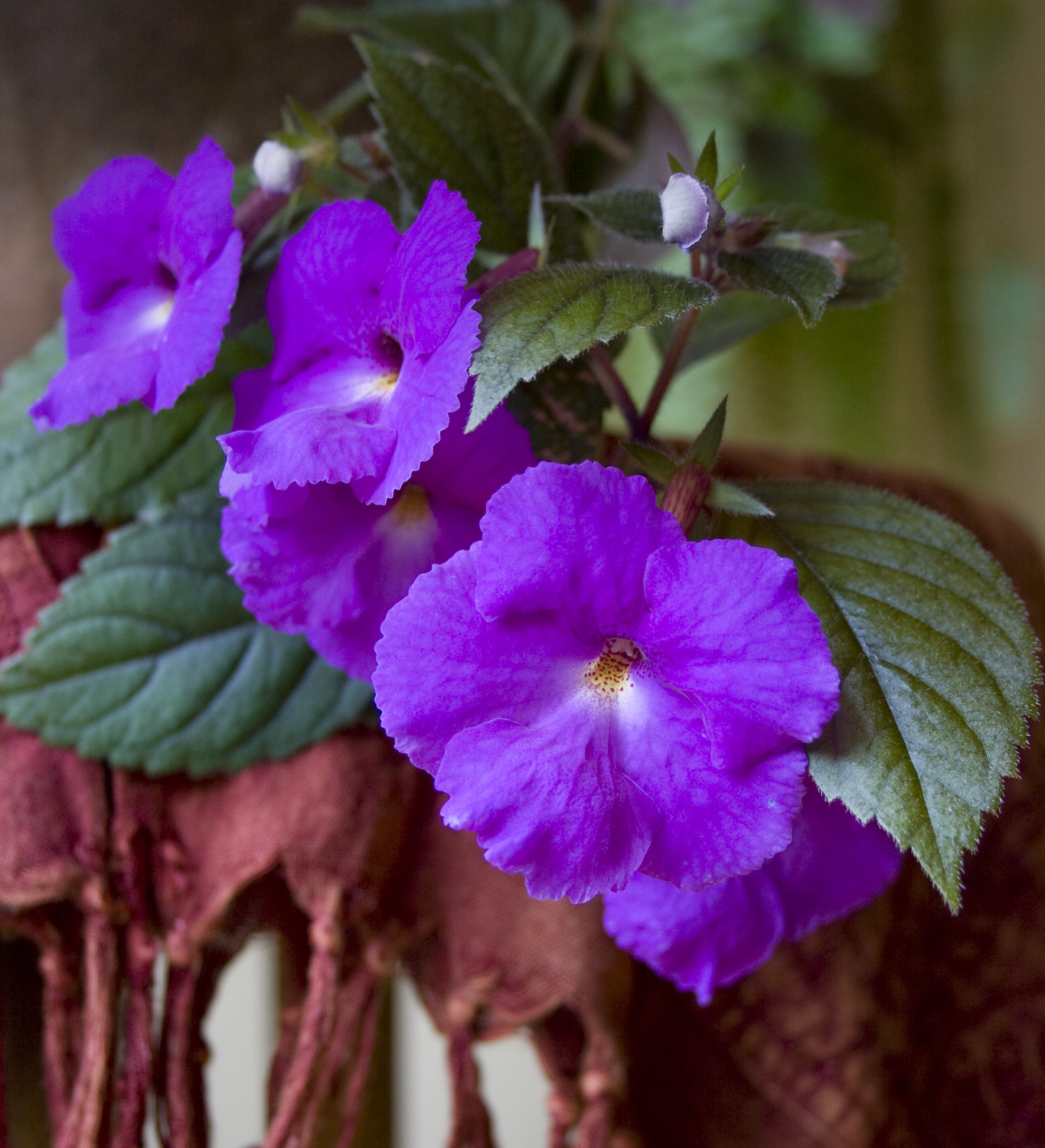

Scientific classification
- Kingdom: Plantae
- Clade: Tracheophytes
- Clade: Angiosperms
- Clade: Eudicots
- Clade: Asterids
- Order: Lamiales
- Family: Gesneriaceae
- Genus: Achimenes; P.Browne (1756)

Species
- 24; see text

Synonyms
- Achaemenes St.-Lag. (1880), orth. var.; Dicyrta Regel (1849); Eumolpe Decne. ex Jacques & Hérincq (1849); Guthnickia Regel (1849); Houttea Heynh. (1846); Locheria Regel (1848); Plectopoma Hanst. (1854); Salutiaea Colla (1849); Scheeria Seem. (1853); Shuria Hérincq (1861); Trevirana Willd. (1809)

= Achimenes =

Genus of flowering plants

Achimenes /æˈkɪmɪniːz/ is a genus of about 25 species of tropical and subtropical rhizomatous perennial herbs in the flowering plant family Gesneriaceae. They have a multitude of common names such as magic flowers, widow's tears, Cupid's bower, or hot water plant.

== Etymology ==
According to some authorities, the plant's name may come from the Greek word cheimanos meaning "tender" or "sensitive to cold".

== Range and taxonomy ==
The genus is native to Mexico and Central America, with one species (A. erecta) occurring naturally in the West Indies. The largest number of species is found in Mexico. Several species and hybrids are widely cultivated and naturalized outside their native range. A complete list of the species, with their synonyms and geographic distributions, can be found in the Smithsonian Institution's World Checklist of Gesneriaceae.

Two species previously included in Achimenes are now classified in the segregation genus Eucodonia and several phylogenetic studies have supported this separation.

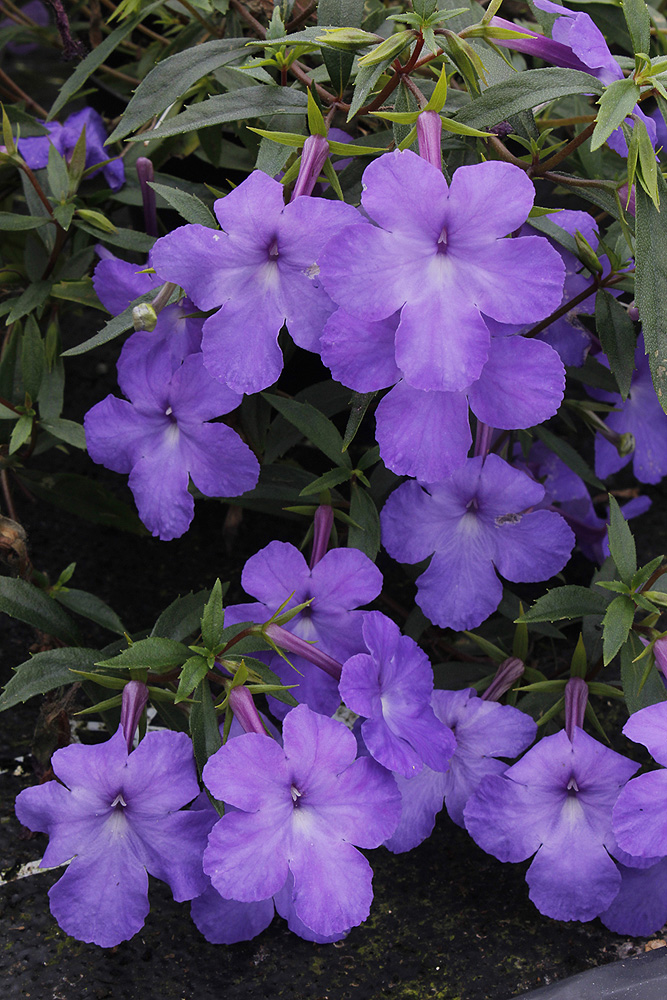
Achimenes cettoana in cultivation

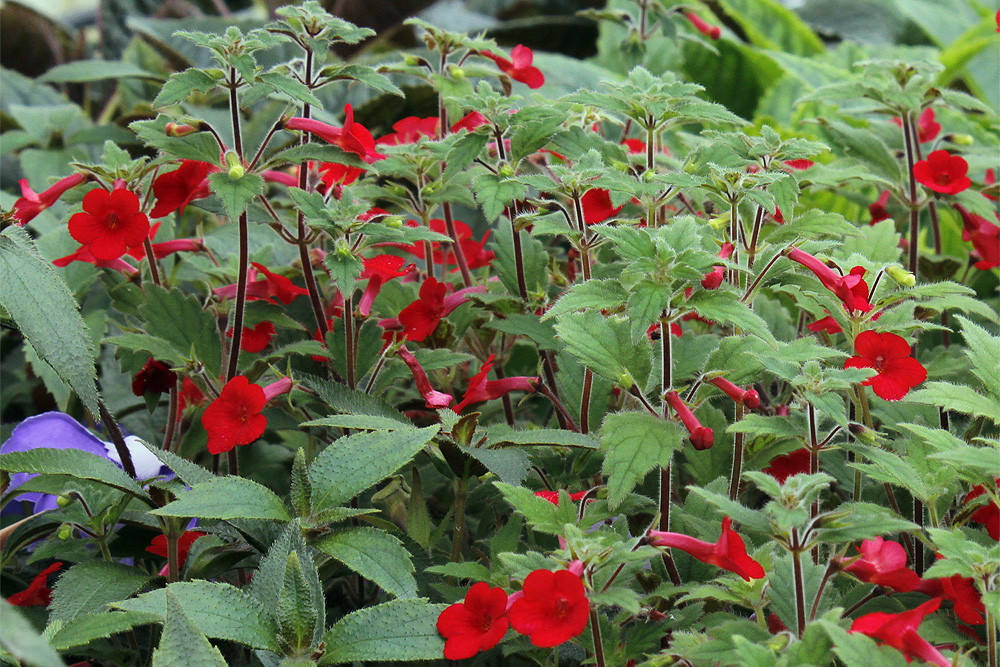
Achimenes erecta in cultivation

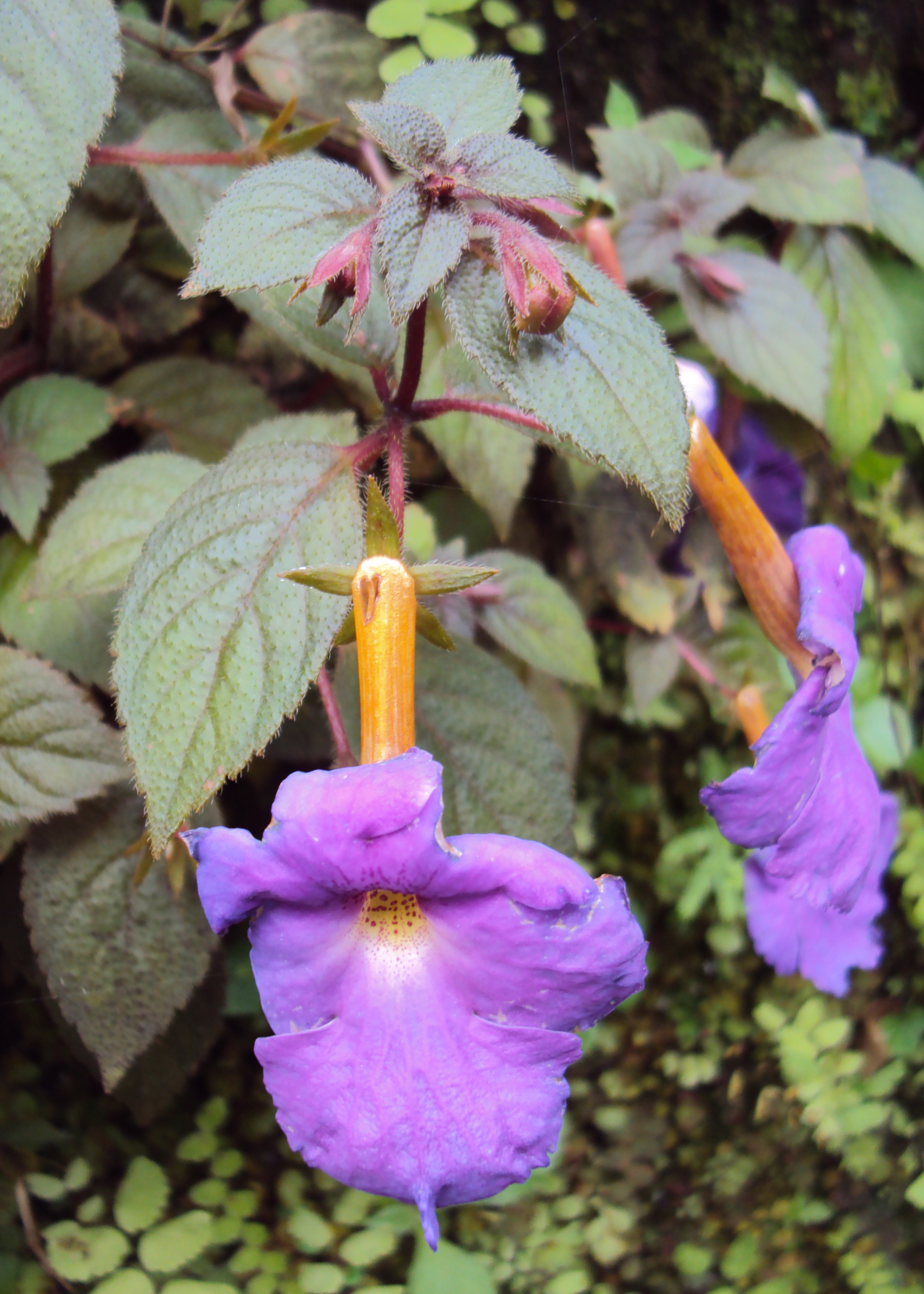
Achimenes longiflora in cultivation

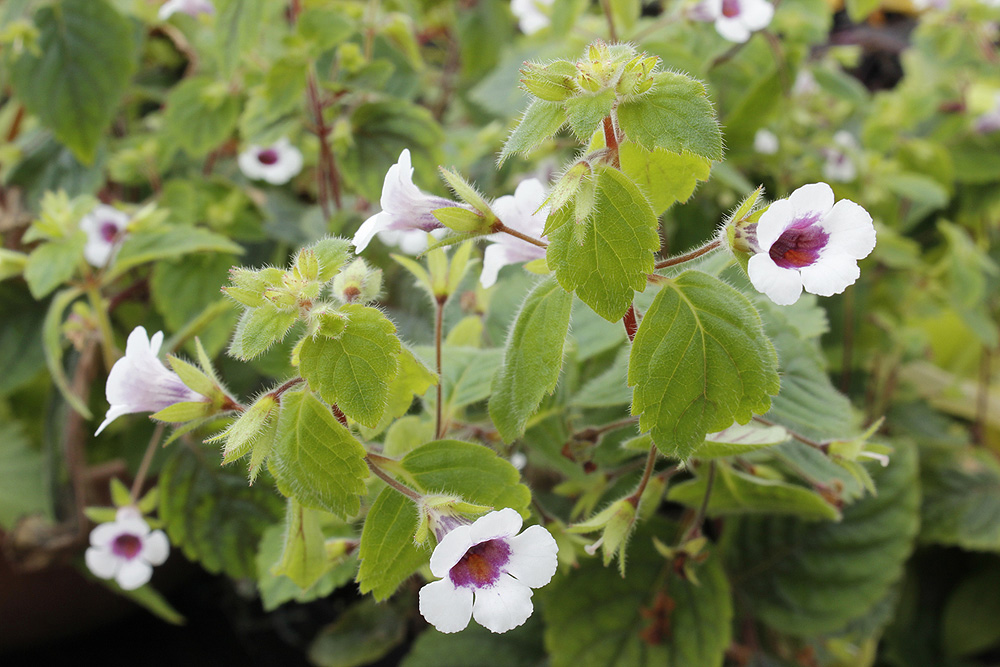
Achimenes misera in cultivation

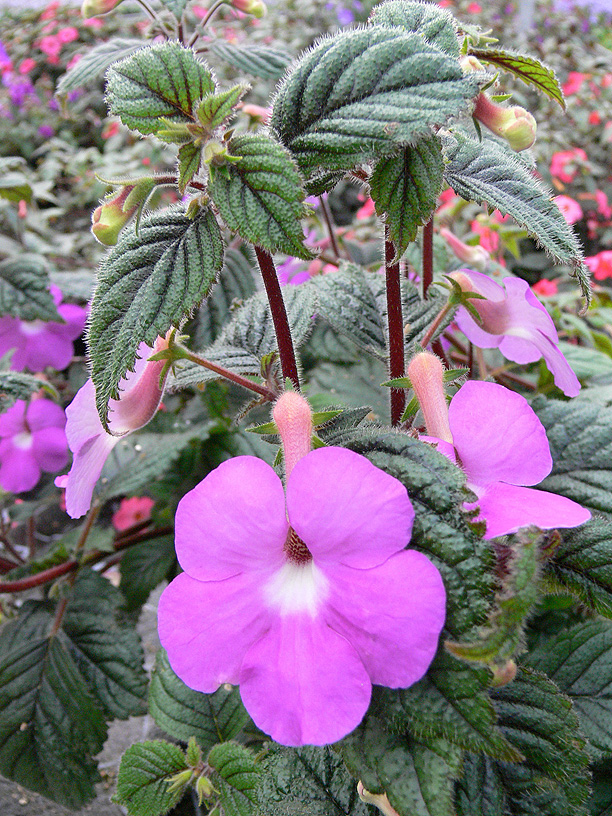
Achimenes patens 'Major' in cultivation

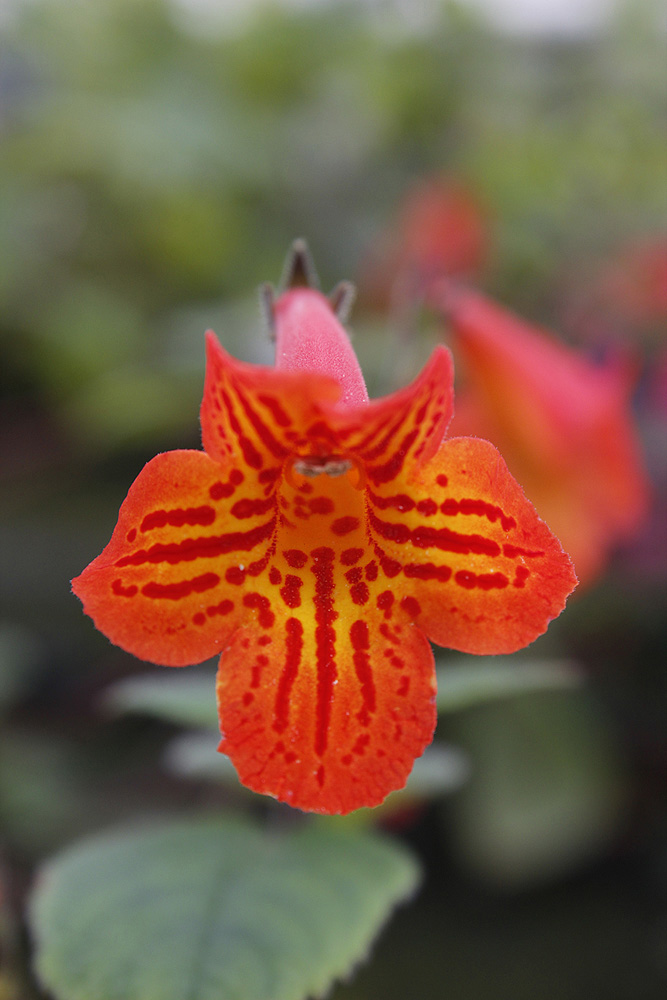
Achimenes pedunculata in cultivation

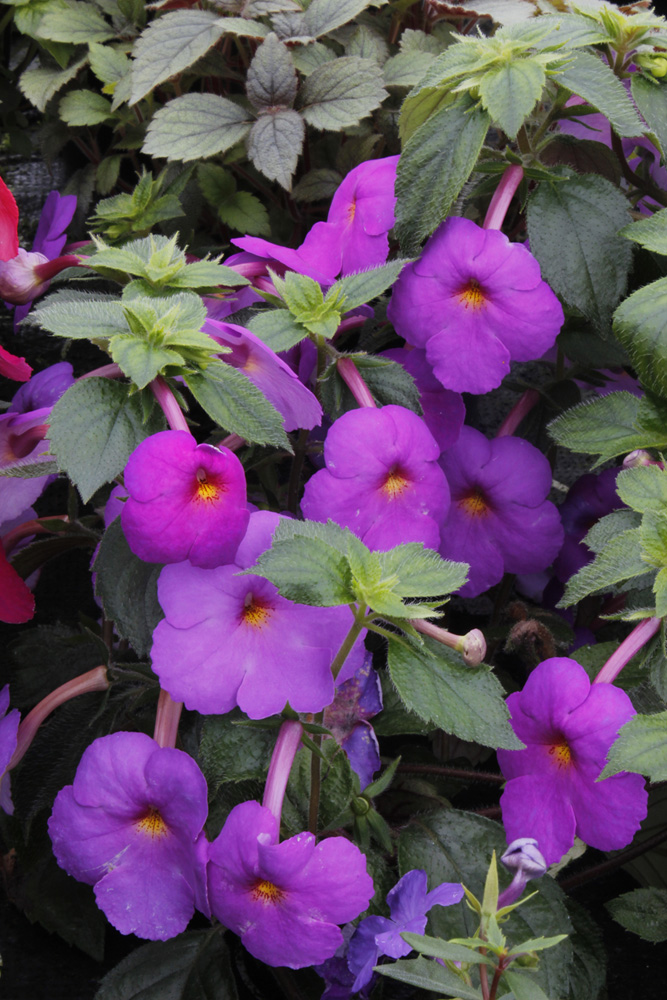
Achimenes skinneri in cultivation

=== Species ===
24 species are accepted.

- Achimenes admirabilis Wiehler
- Achimenes antirrhina (DC.) C.V.Morton
- Achimenes brevifolia C.V.Morton
- Achimenes candida Lindl.
- Achimenes cettoana H.E.Moore
- Achimenes dulcis C.V.Morton
- Achimenes erecta (Lam.) H.P.Fuchs
- Achimenes fimbriata Rose ex C.V.Morton
- Achimenes flava C.V.Morton
- Achimenes glabrata (Zucc.) Fitzg.
- Achimenes grandiflora (Schiede) DC.
- Achimenes heterophylla (Mart.) DC.
- Achimenes hintoniana Ram.-Roa & L.E.Skog
- Achimenes ixtapaensis Beutelsp. & J.Mart.-Mel.
- Achimenes longiflora DC.
- Achimenes mexicana (Seem.) Benth. & Hook.f. ex Fritsch
- Achimenes misera Lindl.
- Achimenes nayaritensis L.E.Skog
- Achimenes obscura C.V.Morton
- Achimenes occidentalis C.V.Morton
- Achimenes patens Benth.
- Achimenes pedunculata Benth.
- Achimenes skinneri Gordon ex Lindl.
- Achimenes woodii C.V.Morton

== Cultivation ==
Achimenes species and hybrids are commonly grown as greenhouse plants, or outdoors as bedding plants in subtropical regions. The species have been extensively hybridized, with many of the hybrids involving the large-flowered species A. grandiflora and A. longiflora. Many of the species and their hybrids have large, brightly colored flowers and are cultivated as ornamental greenhouse and bedding plants. They are generally easy to grow as long as their basic requirements are met: a rich well-drained soil on the acid side, bright indirect light, warmth, constant moisture, and high humidity. They have a winter dormancy and overwinter as scaly rhizomes, which should be kept dry until they sprout again in the spring. Some of the species and their hybrids are moderately hardy and can be grown outdoors year-round in zone 8, or even zone 7 with protection.

In the UK, the following have gained the Royal Horticultural Society's Award of Garden Merit:-

- 'Ambroise Verschaffelt'
- 'Hilda Michelsen'
- × Achimenantha' Inferno' (× Achimenantha is an intergeneric hybrid between Achimenes and Smithiantha)
