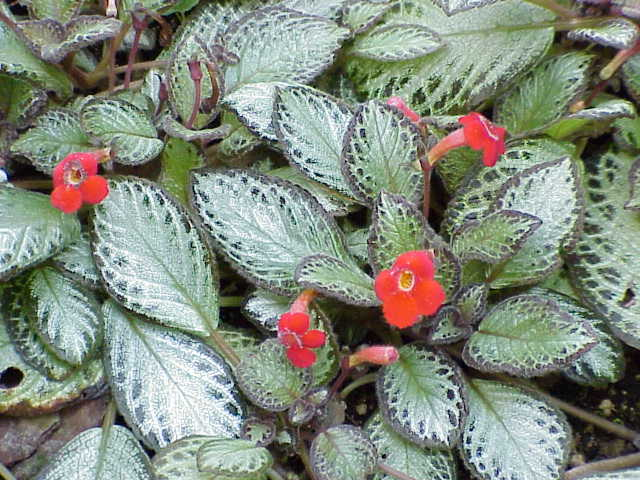
- Episcia reptans

Scientific classification
- Kingdom: Plantae
- Clade: Tracheophytes
- Clade: Angiosperms
- Clade: Eudicots
- Clade: Asterids
- Order: Lamiales
- Family: Gesneriaceae
- Subfamily: Gesnerioideae
- Genus: Episcia; Mart. (1829)

Species
- See text

Synonyms
- Cyrtodeira Hanst. (1853)

= Episcia =

Genus of flowering plants

Episcia is a genus of flowering plants in the African violet family, Gesneriaceae. The ten species it contains are native to the tropical regions of Central and South America. The species are perennial herbaceous plants characterized by a stoloniferous habit, red (rarely orange, pink, blue or yellow) flowers, and frequently have marked or patterned leaves. Episcias are sometimes called flame violets.

== Taxonomy ==
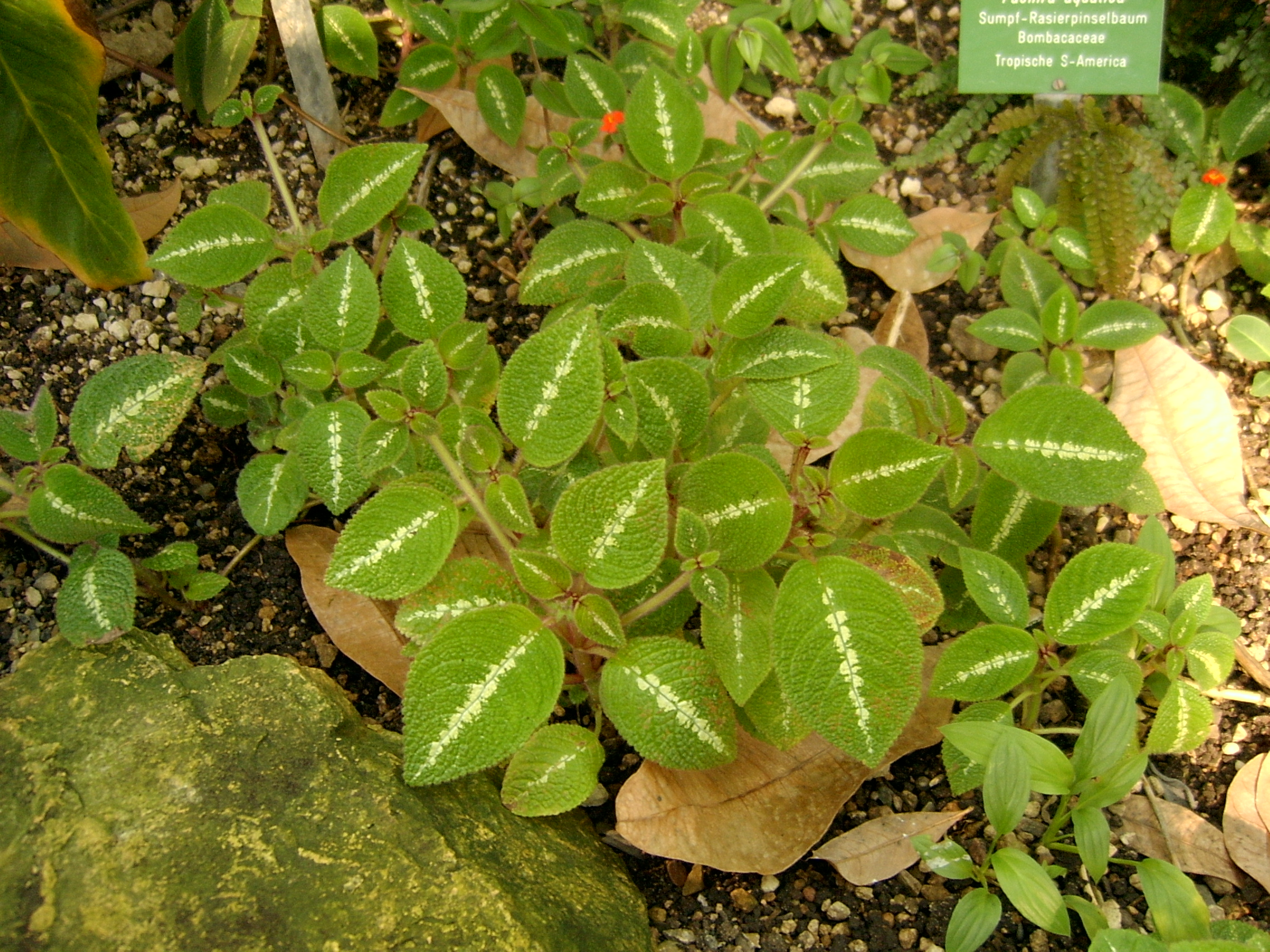
Episcia cupreata

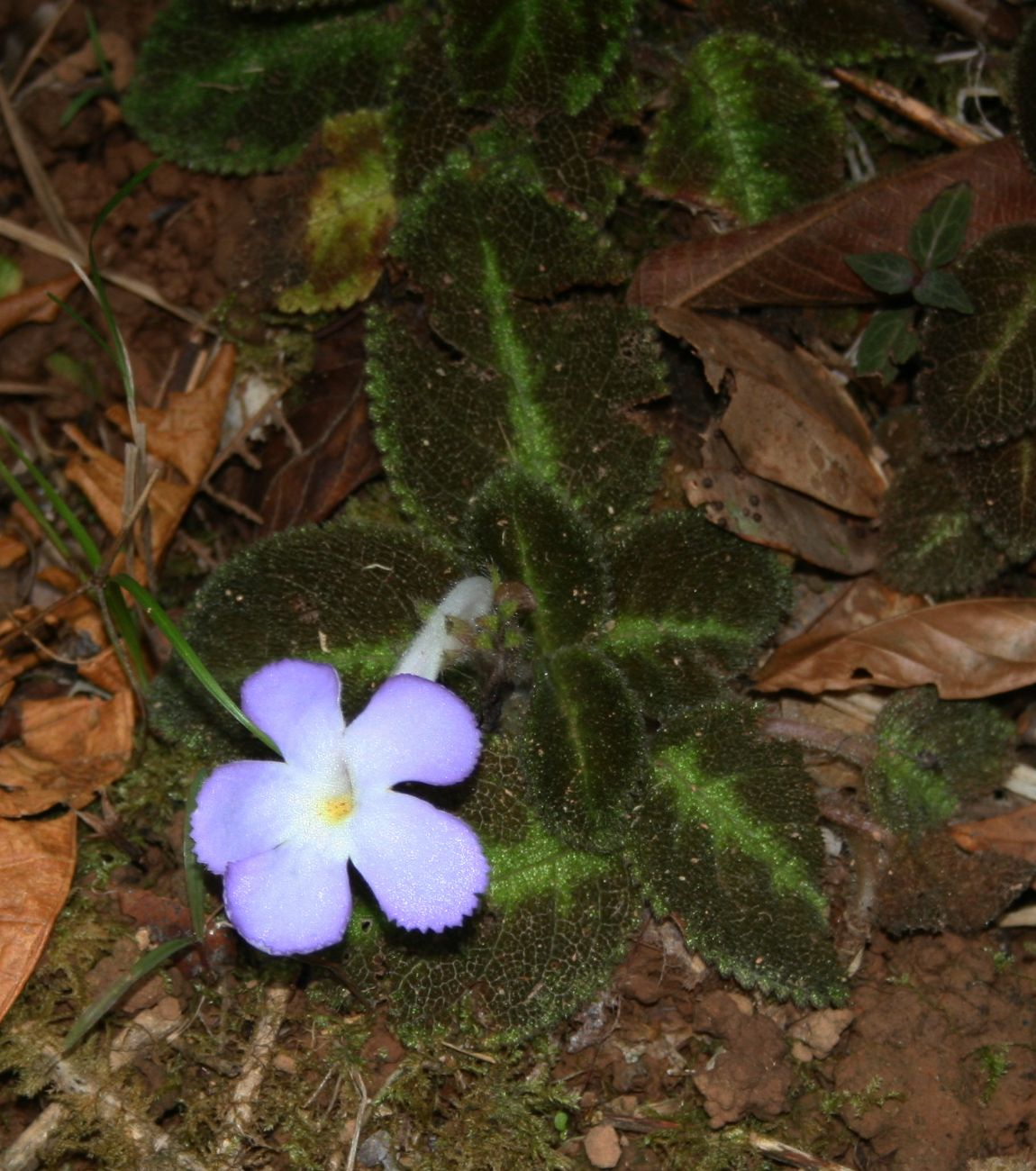
Episcia lilacina

The genus name is derived from the Greek επισκισς (episkios), meaning "shaded". This refers to the understory habitat of these plants.

For much of the twentieth century Episcia had a broad circumscription but since 1978 has been restricted to a much narrower one, with the genera Paradrymonia, Chrysothemis, Nautilocalyx, and Alsobia separated from it. The segregation of these genera from Episcia has been supported in recent molecular phylogenies.

=== Species ===
Section Episcia

- Episcia andina Wiehler
- Episcia cupreata (Hook.) Hanst.
- Episcia duidae Feuillet
- Episcia lilacina Hanst.
- Episcia prancei Wiehler
- Episcia reptans Mart.
- Episcia xantha Leeuwenb.

Section Trematanthera (Leeuwenb.) Feuillet

- Episcia fimbriata Fritsch
- Episcia sphalera Leeuwenb.
- Episcia rubra Feuillet

== Cultivation ==
They are frequently cultivated elsewhere and sometimes naturalize in tropical regions. In both tropical and temperate regions, they are grown as houseplants primarily for their attractive foliage. Numerous cultivars have been produced, primarily by selection and hybridization of the species E. cupreata and E. reptans.
