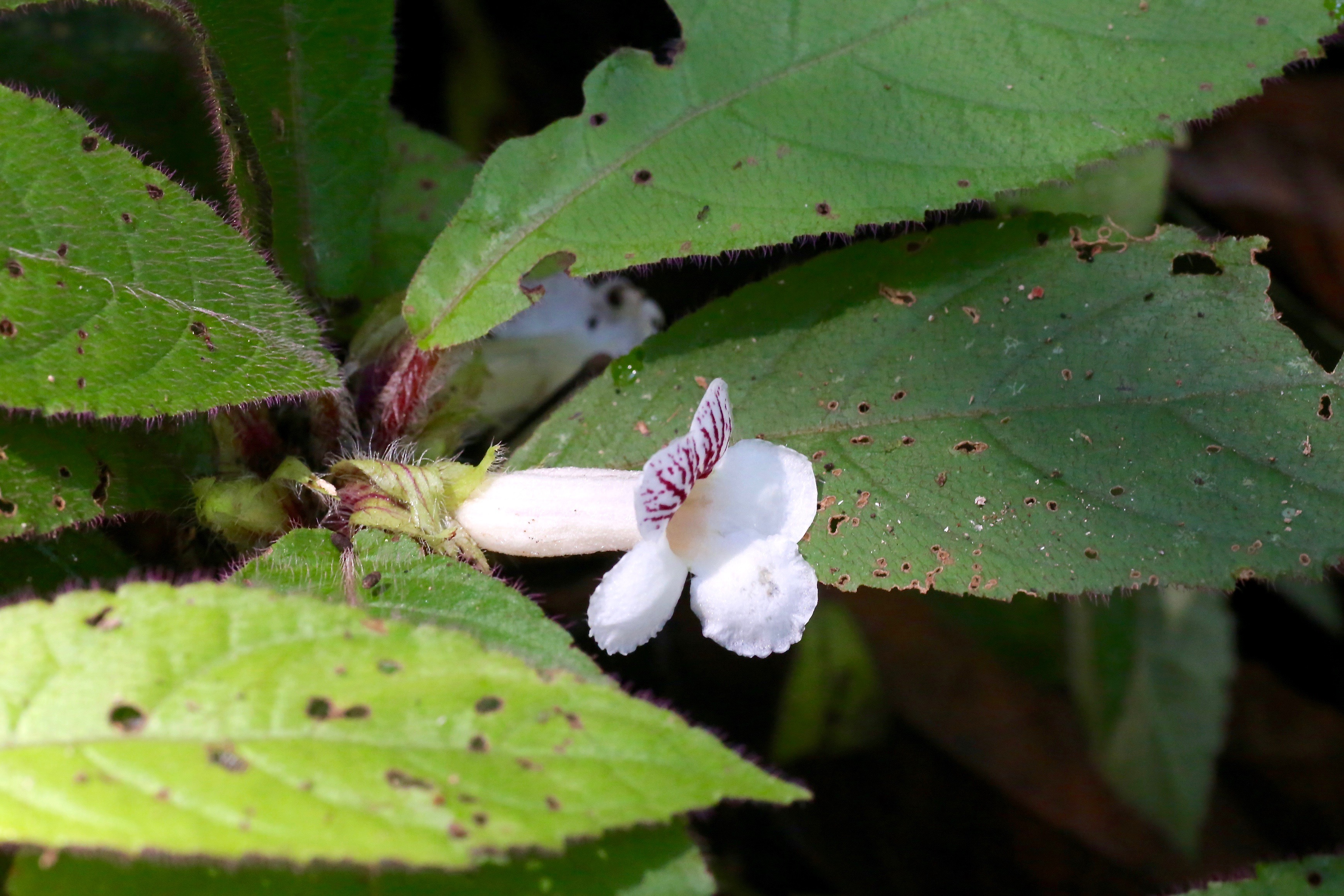

Conservation status
- Near Threatened (IUCN 3.1)

Scientific classification
- Kingdom: Plantae
- Clade: Tracheophytes
- Clade: Angiosperms
- Clade: Eudicots
- Clade: Asterids
- Order: Lamiales
- Family: Gesneriaceae
- Genus: Nautilocalyx
- Species: N. ecuadoranus

Binomial name
- Nautilocalyx ecuadoranus Wiehler

= Nautilocalyx ecuadoranus =

Species of flowering plant

Nautilocalyx ecuadoranus is a species of plant in the family Gesneriaceae. It is endemic to Ecuador. Its natural habitats are subtropical or tropical moist lowland forests and subtropical or tropical moist montane forests.
