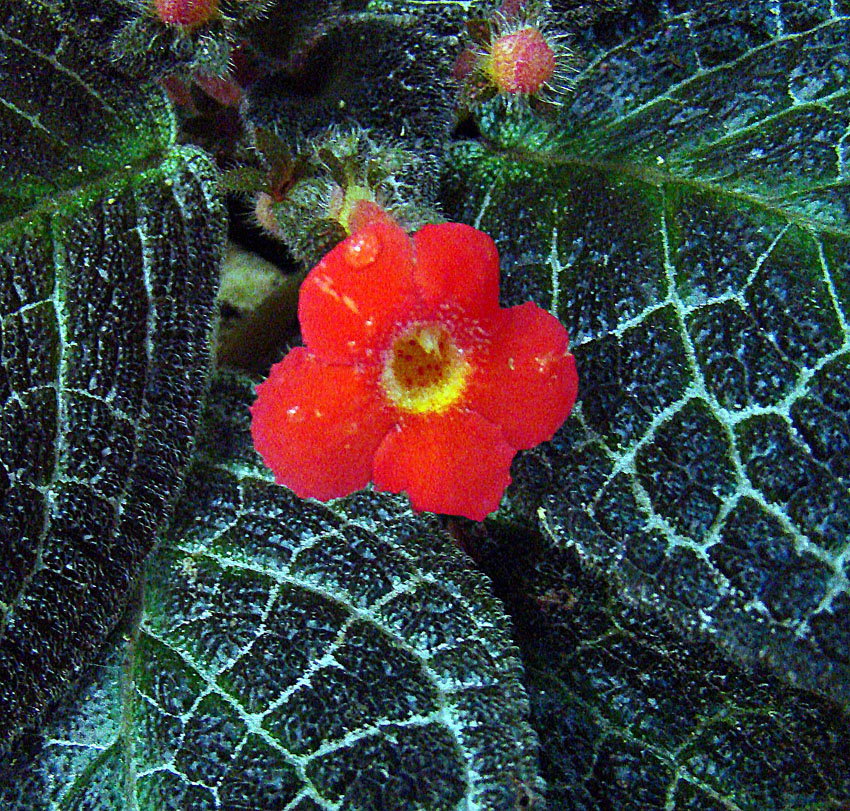

Scientific classification
- Kingdom: Plantae
- Clade: Tracheophytes
- Clade: Angiosperms
- Clade: Eudicots
- Clade: Asterids
- Order: Lamiales
- Family: Gesneriaceae
- Genus: Episcia
- Species: E. cupreata

Binomial name
- Episcia cupreata (Hook.) Hanst.

Synonyms
- Achimenes cupreata Hook.; Cyrtodeira cupreata (Hook.) Hanst.; Cyrtodeira trianae Hanst.; Episcia splendens (Linden) Hanst.; Tapina splendens Linden

= Episcia cupreata =

Species of perennial plant

Episcia cupreata is a species of perennial plant in the family Gesneriaceae that is found in Brazil, Colombia, and Venezuela. Its common name is flame violet, although this name may also refer to other species of the genus Episcia. A number of hybrids have been created.

== Description ==
The species has short hairy stems and reddish to green stolons (runners). Leaves are oval shaped with hairy blades that vary from either a deep copper, reddish-green, or only green. Specks of copper and purple are found on leaf underside. Its flower corolla lobes are orange-red with yellow tube. Although the plant does produce seeds, it typically reproduces by stolons.

== Ecology ==
Aphids and mealybugs feed on the plant. It can be subjected to fungal leaf spots, blights on the stem, and rotting roots. The leaves become scorched if they receive too much sunlight, and the plant can die if it receives too much water or too little air.

== Hybrids ==
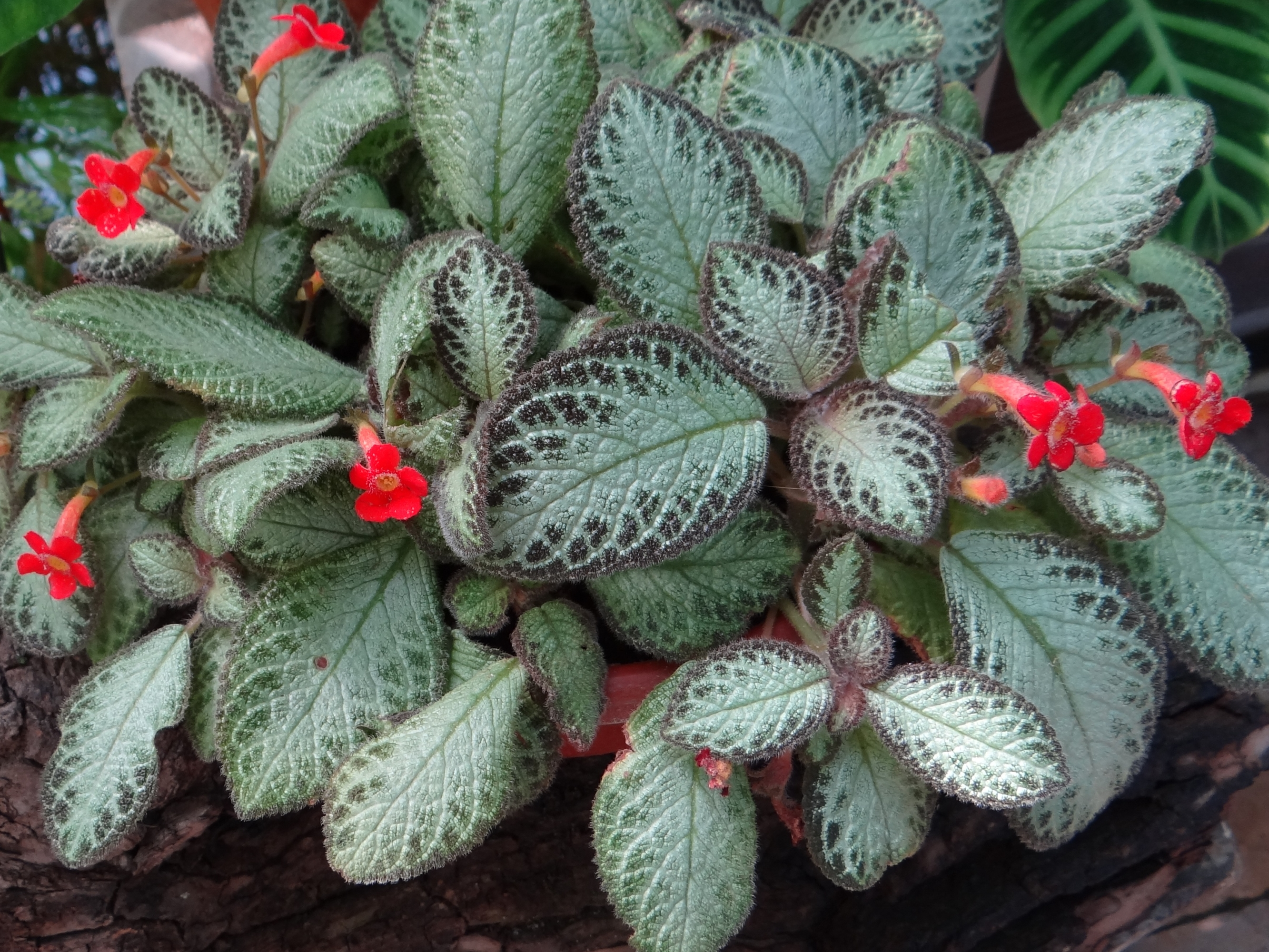
The hybrid Silver Sheen

The plant was once grown from seeds that were sent to the Royal Botanic Gardens, Kew, from Colombia in 1845. In later years, multiple hybrids with this species were created. While leaf shape varies among hybrids, the flowers always have the same form.

Among the hybrids, 'Acajou' has a broad pattern of leaves that are silver-green, 'Chocolate Soldier' has dark leaves with a wide silver midrib, 'Emerald Green' has a narrow silver midrib with silver vein, 'Frosty' is emerald-green with a wide silver midrib, 'Harlequin' has dark leaves, and 'Silver Sheen' has a silver center with dark margins.

The naturally occurring variety Episcia cupreata var. viridifolia (Hook.) Hanst. was once recognised, but this is now regarded as a junior synonym of the nominate variety, E. c. var. cupreata.
