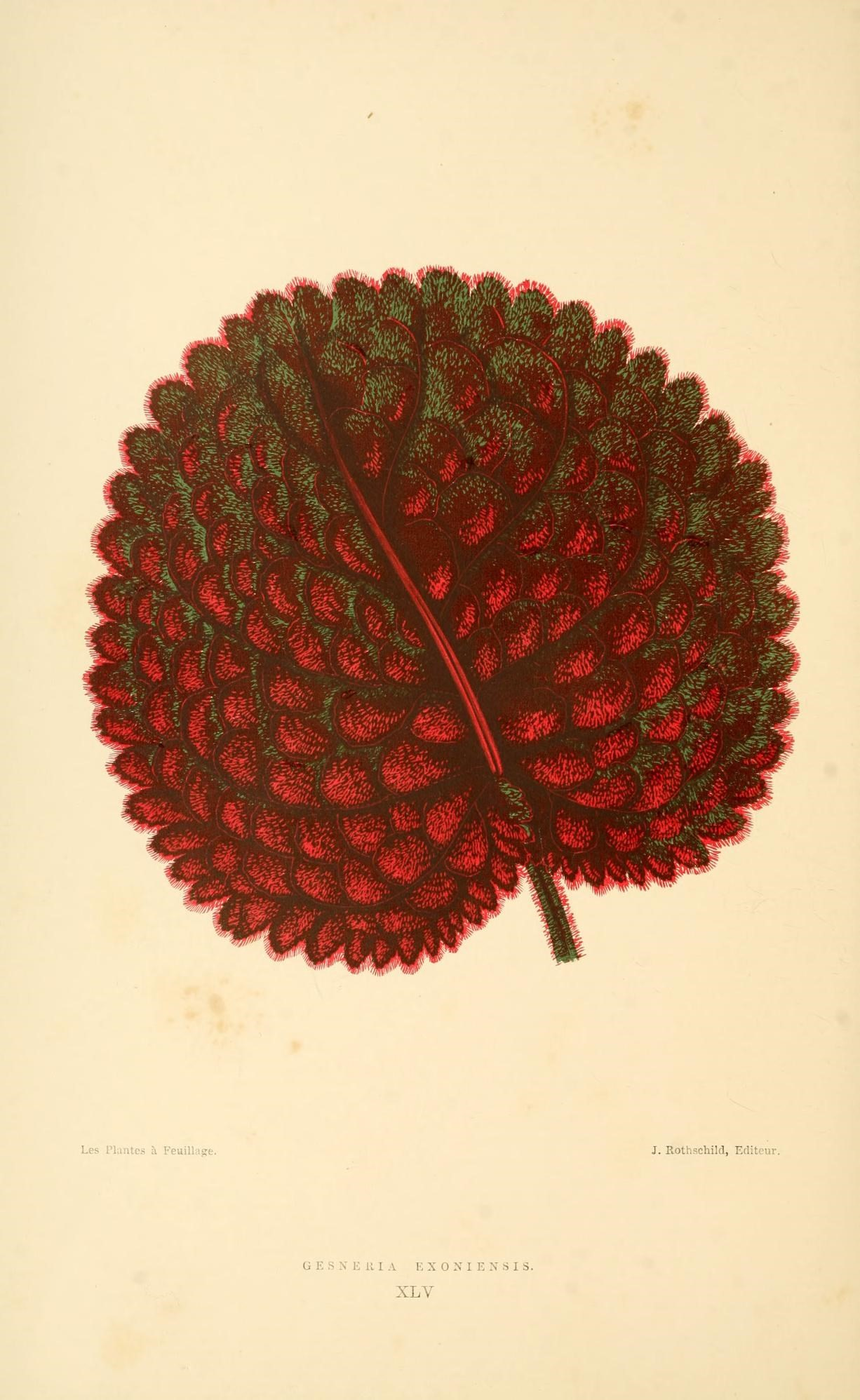

Scientific classification
- Kingdom: Plantae
- Clade: Tracheophytes
- Clade: Angiosperms
- Clade: Eudicots
- Clade: Asterids
- Order: Lamiales
- Family: Gesneriaceae
- Genus: Smithiantha
- Species: S. zebrina

Binomial name
- Smithiantha zebrina (Paxton) Kuntze (1891)

Synonyms
- Synonymy: Corytholoma bulbosum var. splendens (Bosse) Voss (1894); Corytholoma splendens (Bosse) Fritsch (1894); Dircaea suttonii var. picta Regel (1859); Gesneria gerardiana Lem. (1846); Gesneria geroltiana Kunth & C.D.Bouché (1844); Gesneria houttei de Vos ex C.Morren (1886); Gesneria refulgens W.Bull ex Anon. (1861); Gesneria splendens Bosse (1829); Gesneria splendidissima Regel (1860); Gesneria zebrina Paxton (1841) (basionym); Gloxinia punctata M.Martens & Galeotti (1842); Naegelia geroltiana (Kunth & C.D.Bouché) Regel (1848); Naegelia punctata Hemsl. (1882); Naegelia zebrina (Paxton) Regel (1848); Rechsteineria splendens (Bosse) Kuntze (1891); Smithiantha geroltiana (Kunth & C.D.Bouché) Kuntze (1891); Smithiantha punctata Kuntze (1891); Smithiantha zebrina var. geroltiana (Kunth & C.D.Bouché) Voss (1894)

= Smithiantha zebrina =

Species of flowering plant

Smithiantha zebrina is the first Smithiantha species that was used for horticulture. It has red and yellow spotted flowers and dark green leaves. The species is native to eastern Mexico. The stems are 75 cm (2 1/2 ft) tall, the leaves are 125–180 mm (5–7 in) long, and the flowers are 30–40 mm (1 1/4–1 1/2 in) long.
