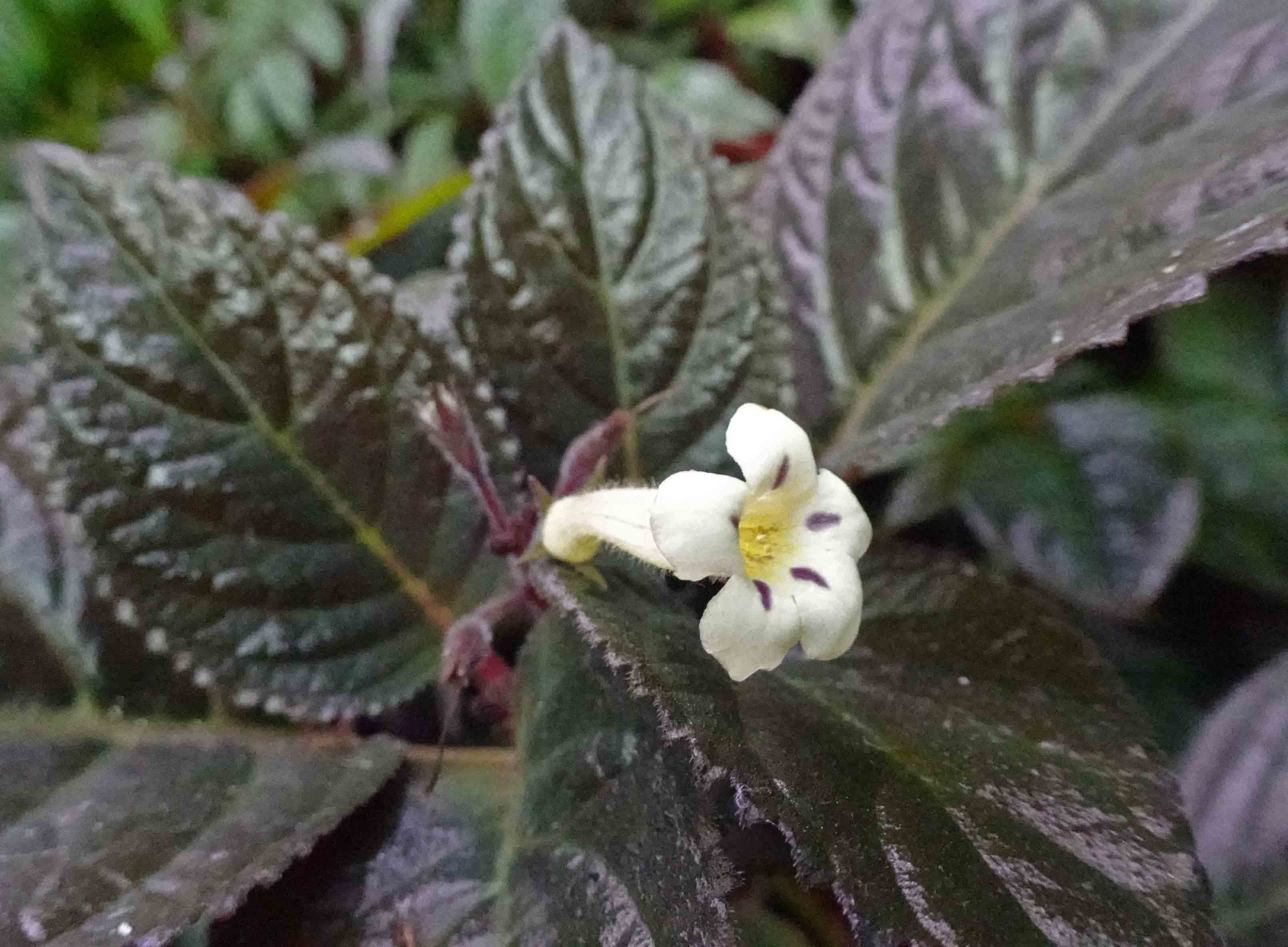

Conservation status
- Vulnerable (IUCN 3.1)

Scientific classification
- Kingdom: Plantae
- Clade: Tracheophytes
- Clade: Angiosperms
- Clade: Eudicots
- Clade: Asterids
- Order: Lamiales
- Family: Gesneriaceae
- Genus: Nautilocalyx
- Species: N. glandulifer

Binomial name
- Nautilocalyx glandulifer Wiehler

= Nautilocalyx glandulifer =

Species of flowering plant

Nautilocalyx glandulifer is a species of plant in the family Gesneriaceae. It is endemic to Ecuador. Its natural habitat is subtropical or tropical moist lowland forests.
