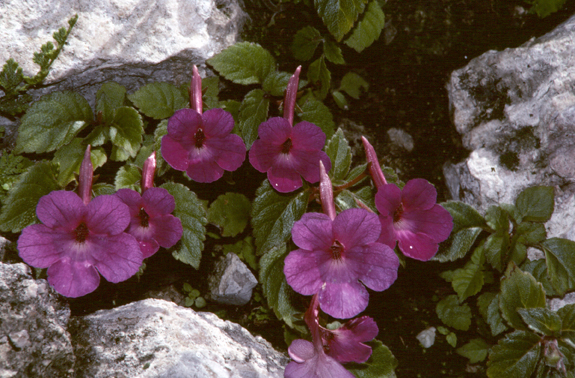

Scientific classification
- Kingdom: Plantae
- Clade: Tracheophytes
- Clade: Angiosperms
- Clade: Eudicots
- Clade: Asterids
- Order: Lamiales
- Family: Gesneriaceae
- Genus: Achimenes
- Species: A. grandiflora

Binomial name
- Achimenes grandiflora (Schltdl.) DC.

Synonyms
- Trevirana grandiflora Schltdl.; Salutiaea grandiflora (Schltdl.) Colla; Achimenes cordata hort. ex Regel; Achimenes grandiflora var. glabrescens Klotzsch ex Hanst.; Achimenes grandiflora var. incisa Hanst.; Achimenes grandiflora var. liebmannii Regel ex Hanst.; Achimenes grandiflora var. pubescens Hanst.; Achimenes incisa (Hanst.) Klotzsch ex Oerst.; Achimenes liebmannii hort. ex Lem.; Gesneria calcarata Sessé & Moc.

= Achimenes grandiflora =

Species of flowering plant

Achimenes grandiflora (Schltdl.) DC. is a plant species in the genus Achimenes, family Gesneriaceae. It is native to Mexico and Central America, growing in mountainous regions from Chihuahua to Nicaragua. It is cultivated as an ornamental in other places because of its showy purple flowers.
