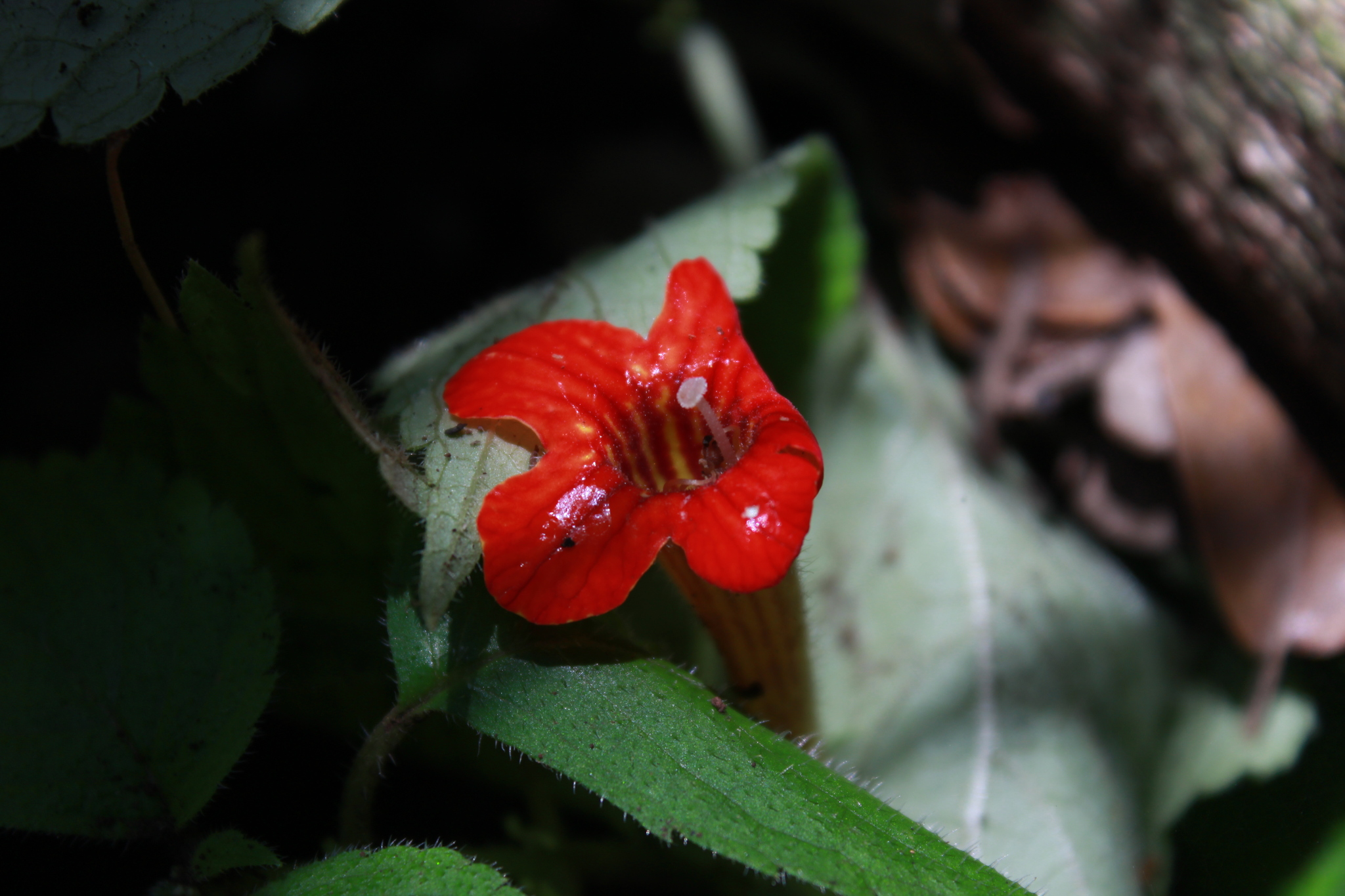

Scientific classification
- Kingdom: Plantae
- Clade: Tracheophytes
- Clade: Angiosperms
- Clade: Eudicots
- Clade: Asterids
- Order: Lamiales
- Family: Gesneriaceae
- Genus: Achimenes
- Species: A. antirrhina

Binomial name
- Achimenes antirrhina (DC.) C.V. Morton

= Achimenes antirrhina =

Species of plant

Achimenes antirrhina is a species of flowering plant from the genus Achimenes. It is only found in southern Mexico. It has a patterned red and orange flower and it has a minimum elevation of 1,920 m (6,300 ft). The species was described on September 8, 1990, by Paul M. Peterson and A. Campos-Villanueva.
