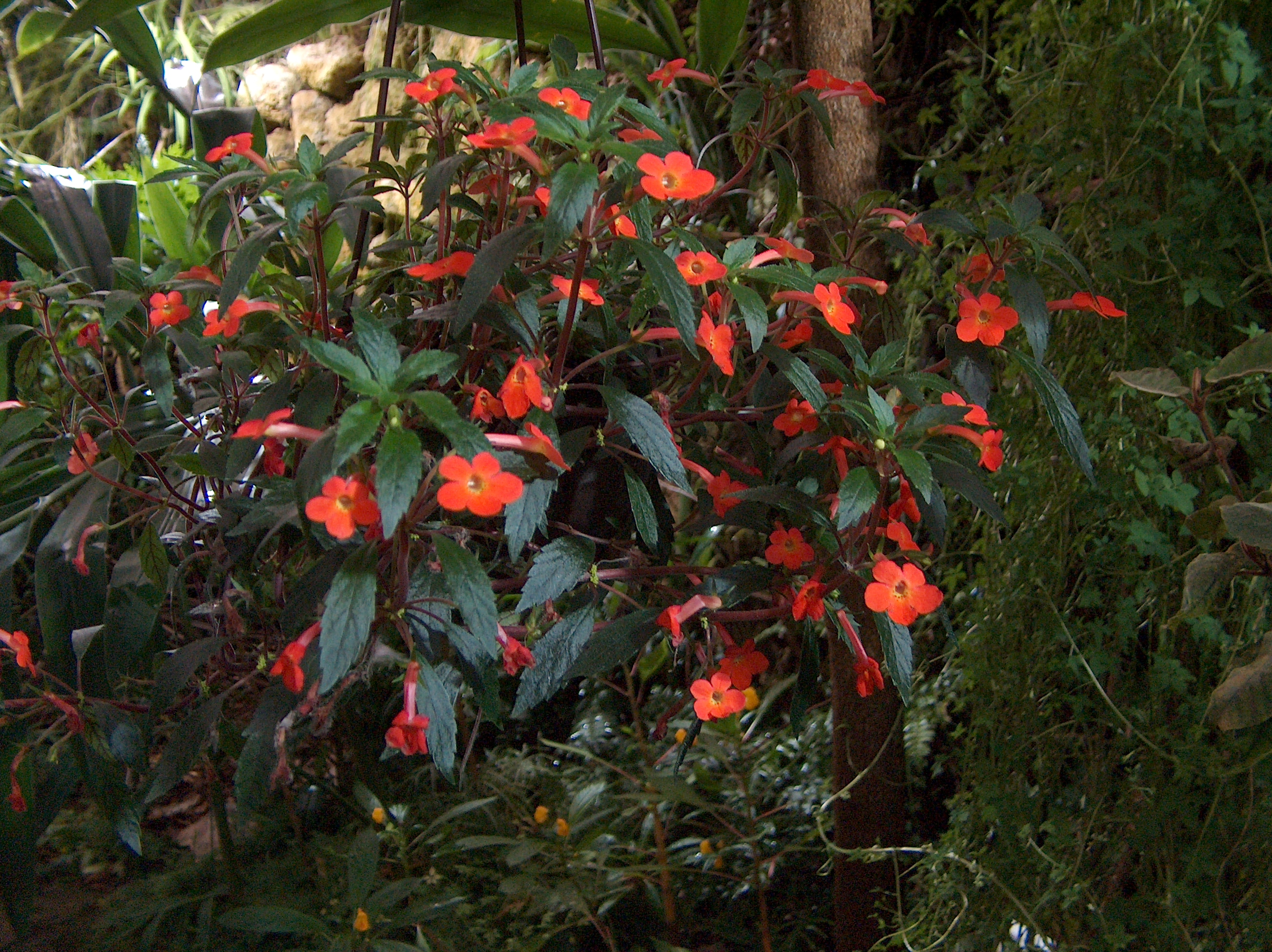

Scientific classification
- Kingdom: Plantae
- Clade: Tracheophytes
- Clade: Angiosperms
- Clade: Eudicots
- Clade: Asterids
- Order: Lamiales
- Family: Gesneriaceae
- Genus: Achimenes
- Species: A. erecta

Binomial name
- Achimenes erecta (Lam.) H.P.Fuchs

= Achimenes erecta =

Species of flowering plant

Achimenes erecta (syn. A. coccinea) is also known as Cupid's bower, nut orchid, and magic flower. Despite its name, Achimenes erecta, this plant is a trailing achimenes. It produces a display of bright red flowers and dark green foliage. The reddish green stem carries groups of hairy, heart-shaped leaves. The flowers last only a few days, but are produced over a period lasting all the way from June to October.
