= Segregate (taxonomy) =

In taxonomy, a segregate, or a segregate taxon is created when a taxon is split off from another taxon. This other taxon will be better known, usually bigger, and will continue to exist, even after the segregate taxon has been split off. A segregate will be either new or ephemeral: there is a tendency for taxonomists to disagree on segregates, and later workers often reunite a segregate with the 'mother' taxon.

If a segregate is generally accepted as a 'good' taxon it ceases to be a segregate. Thus, this is a way of indicating change in the taxonomic status. It should not be confused with, for example, the subdivision of a genus into subgenera.

For example, the genus Alsobia is a segregate from the genus Episcia; The genera Filipendula and Aruncus are segregates from the genus Spiraea.
