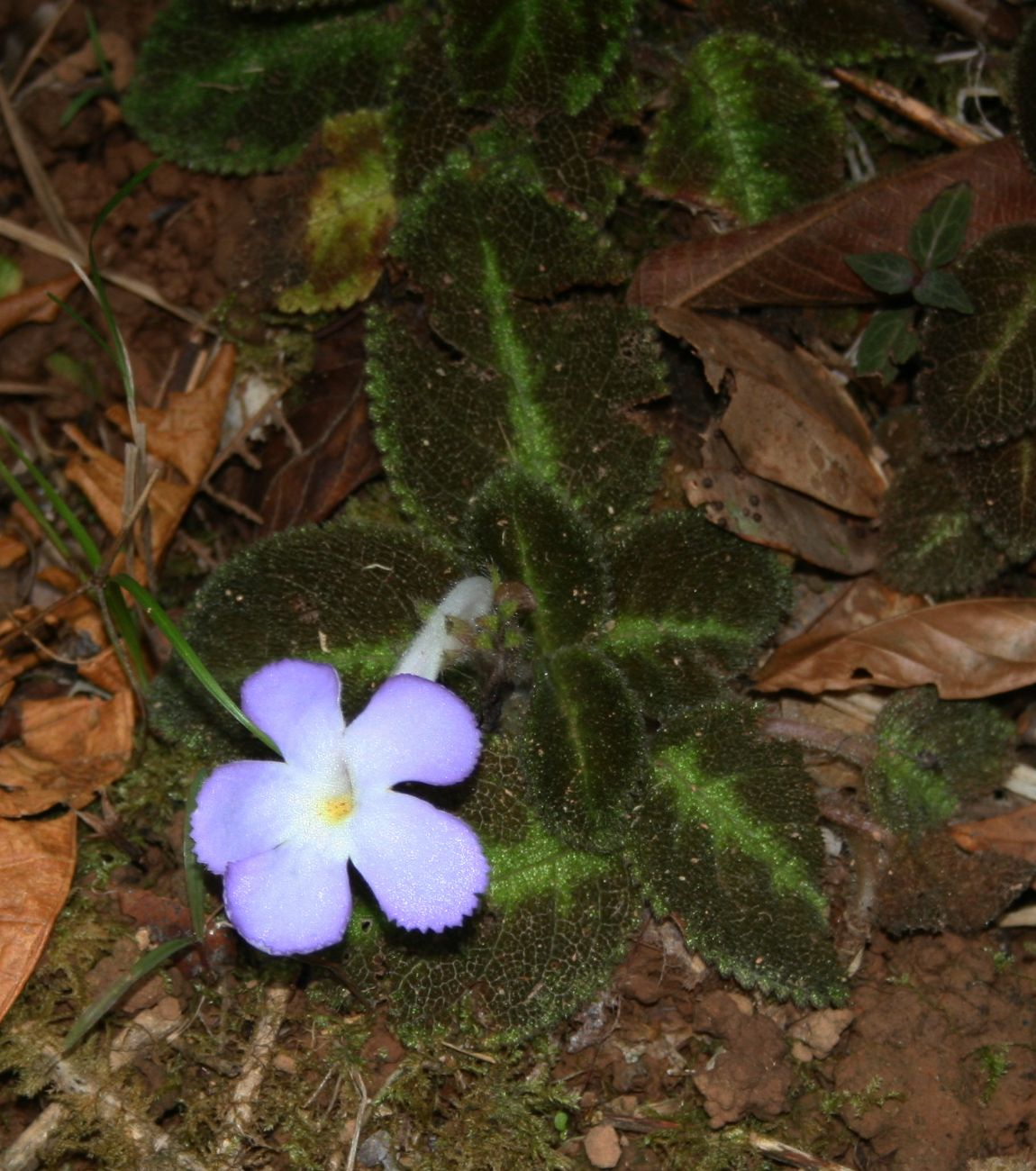

Scientific classification
- Kingdom: Plantae
- Clade: Tracheophytes
- Clade: Angiosperms
- Clade: Eudicots
- Clade: Asterids
- Order: Lamiales
- Family: Gesneriaceae
- Genus: Episcia
- Species: E. lilacina

Binomial name
- Episcia lilacina Hanst. 1865

Synonyms
- Cyrtodeira chontalensis Seem.; Episcia acaulis Donn.Sm.; Episcia chontalensis (Seem.) Hook.f.; Episcia fendleriana Kuntze

= Episcia lilacina =

Species of flowering plant

Episcia lilacina is a plant species in the family Gesneriaceae that is found from Central America to Colombia.
