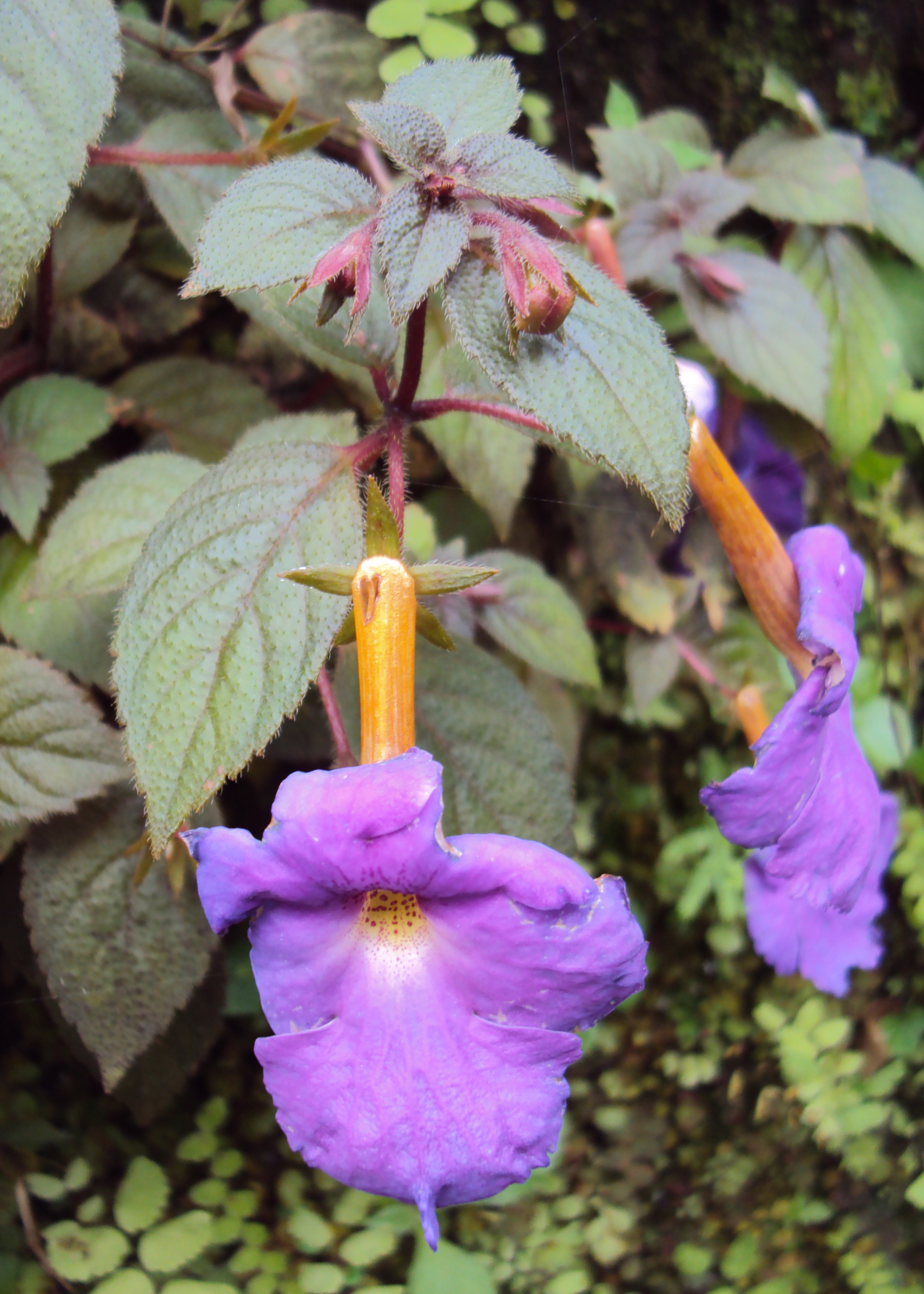
- Flower

Scientific classification
- Kingdom: Plantae
- Clade: Tracheophytes
- Clade: Angiosperms
- Clade: Eudicots
- Clade: Asterids
- Order: Lamiales
- Family: Gesneriaceae
- Genus: Achimenes
- Species: A. longiflora

Binomial name
- Achimenes longiflora DC.

= Achimenes longiflora =

Species of flowering plant

Achimenes longiflora has many common names including Cupid's bow, nut-orchid, and magic flower.

It can grow up to 60 cm (24 in) long, arising from small rhizomes. The hairy leaves have saw toothed edges and can be up to 90 mm (3 1/2 in) long and 40 mm (1 1/2 in) wide. The flowers are produced from June to October and are usually blue with a white throat. They can be quite large – up to 50 mm (2 in) long and 75 mm (3 in) across.

This flor de peña (rock flower) was collected and documented in late summer blooming on embankments and along roadsides at intermediate elevations in Guatemala in the 1970s by Carol Rogers Chickering.
