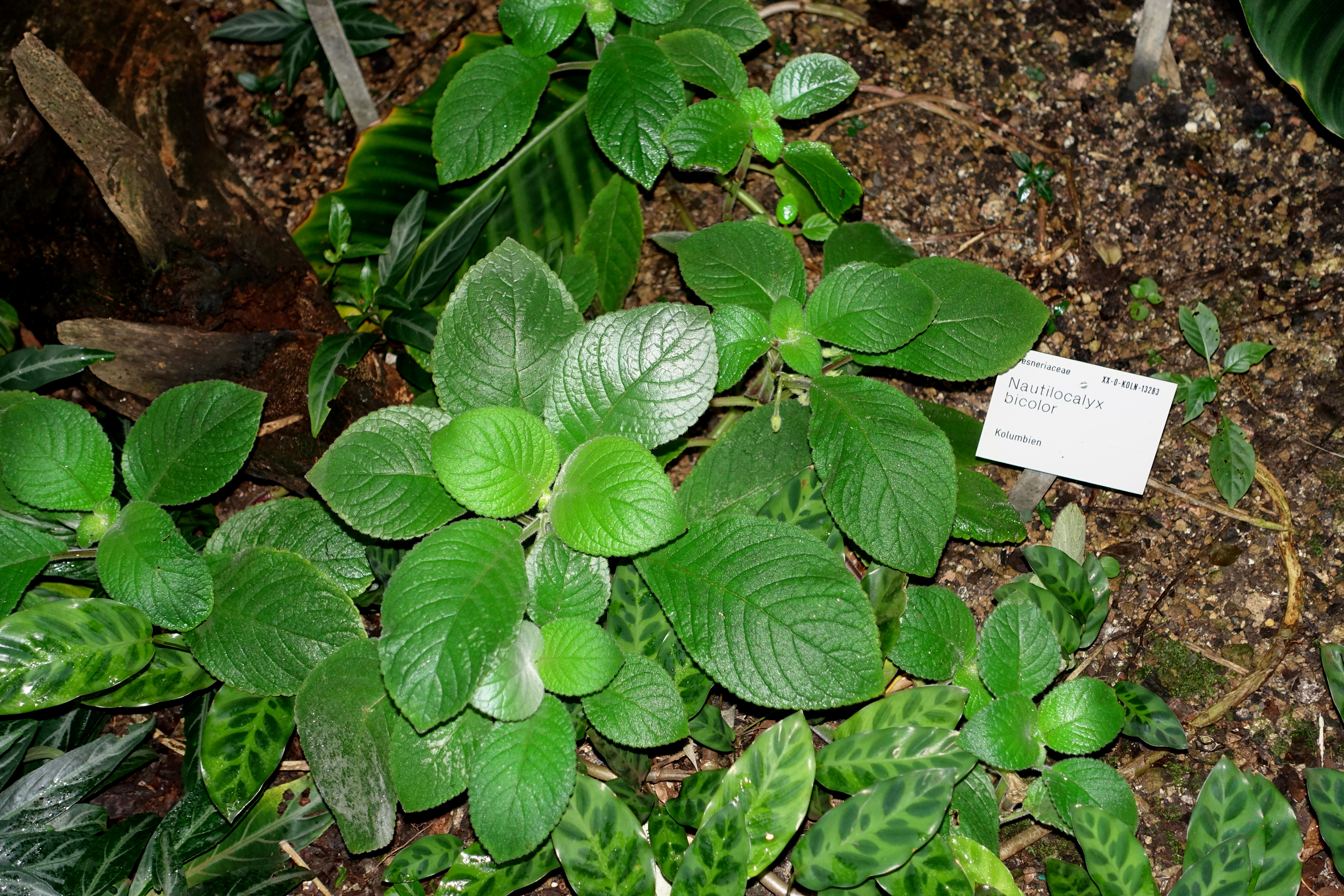

Scientific classification
- Kingdom: Plantae
- Clade: Tracheophytes
- Clade: Angiosperms
- Clade: Eudicots
- Clade: Asterids
- Order: Lamiales
- Family: Gesneriaceae
- Genus: Nautilocalyx
- Species: N. bicolor

Binomial name
- Nautilocalyx bicolor (Hook.) Wiehler

= Nautilocalyx bicolor =

Species of flowering plant

Nautilocalyx bicolor is a species of plant in the family Gesneriaceae. It is endemic to South America.

== Synonyms ==
- Episcia bicolor Hook.
- Physodeira bicolor (Hook.) Hanst.
