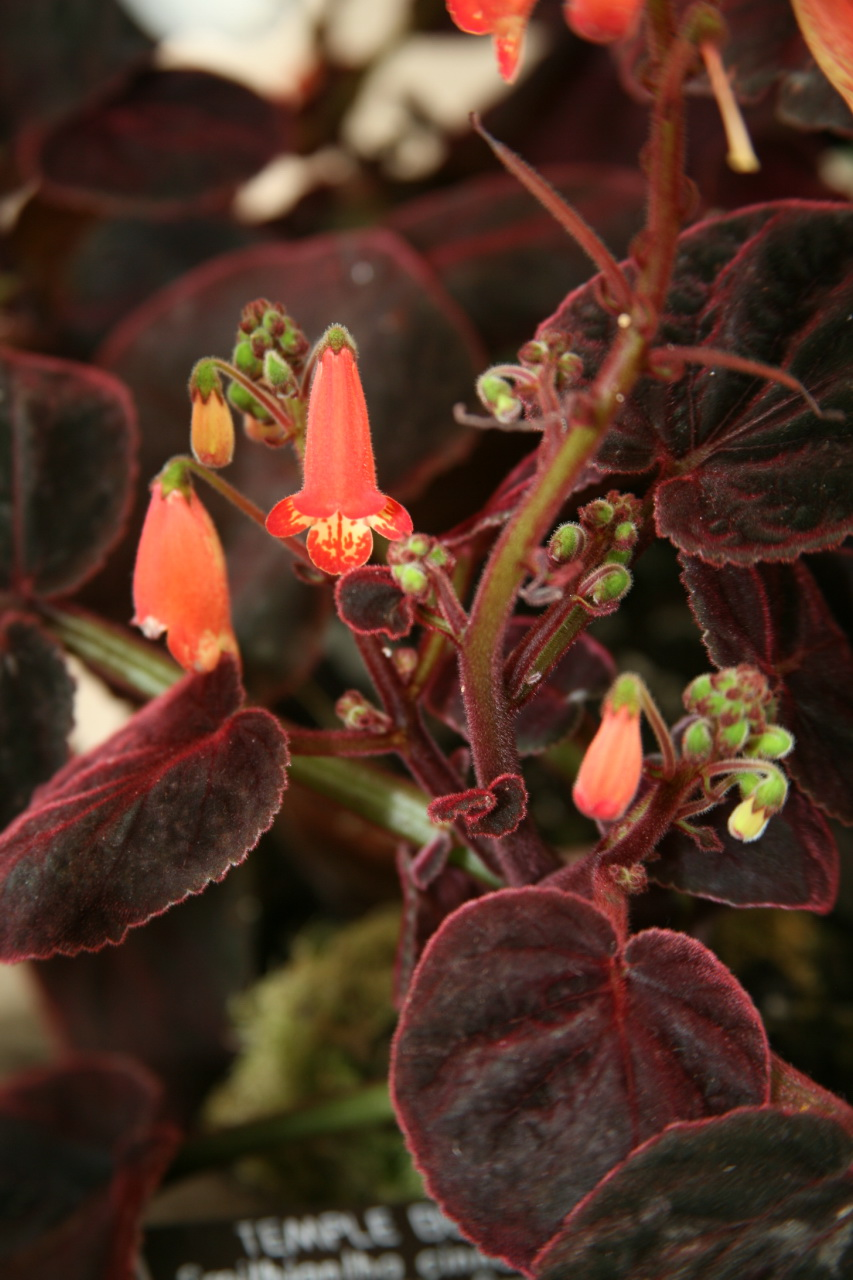
- Smithiantha cinnabarina

Scientific classification
- Kingdom: Plantae
- Clade: Tracheophytes
- Clade: Angiosperms
- Clade: Eudicots
- Clade: Asterids
- Order: Lamiales
- Family: Gesneriaceae
- Genus: Smithiantha; Kuntze (1891)

Synonyms
- Naegelia Regel (1848), nom. illeg.

= Smithiantha =

Genus of flowering plants

Smithiantha, sometimes referred to as temple bells, is a genus of flowering plants in the family Gesneriaceae, endemic to Mexico, primarily in Oaxaca state.

== Species ==
Six species are accepted.

- Smithiantha aurantica Wiehler
- Smithiantha canarina Wiehler
- Smithiantha cinnabarina (Linden) Kuntze
- Smithiantha laui Wiehler
- Smithiantha zebrina (Paxton) Kuntze
