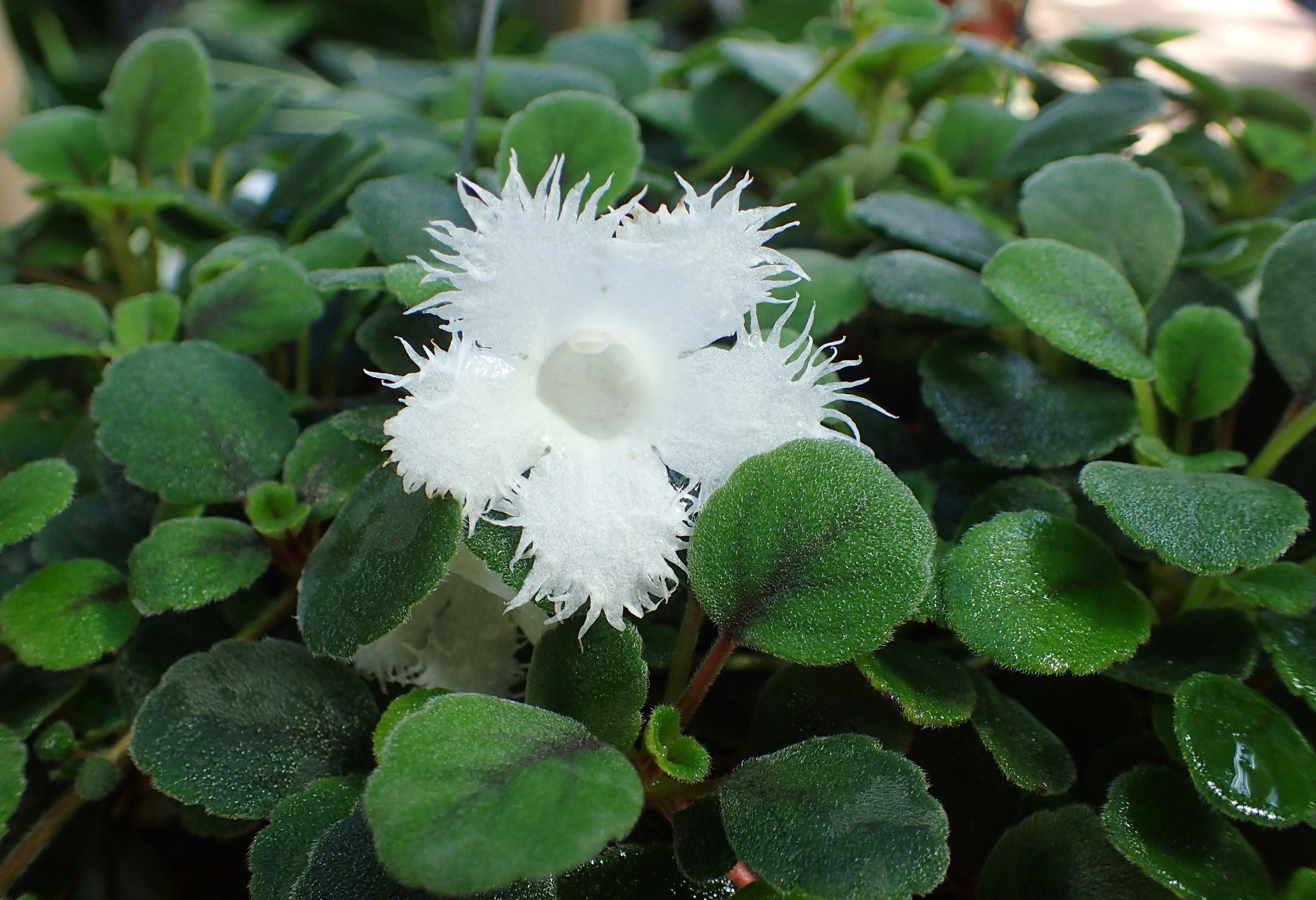
- Alsobia dianthiflora

Scientific classification
- Kingdom: Plantae
- Clade: Tracheophytes
- Clade: Angiosperms
- Clade: Eudicots
- Clade: Asterids
- Order: Lamiales
- Family: Gesneriaceae
- Genus: Alsobia; Hanst. (1853)

Species
- 6; see text

= Alsobia =

Genus of flowering plants

Alsobia is a genus of flowering plants in the family Gesneriaceae, native to Mexico, Guatemala, and Costa Rica. It contains four species.

The species in the genus are succulent and stoloniferous herbs. They were previously included in the genus Episcia, but recent molecular studies have supported the separation of Alsobia from Episcia.

== Species ==
Six species are accepted.

- Alsobia baroniae L.E.Skog & Barrie
- Alsobia chiapensis Mart.-Mel., L.E.Skog & Pérez-Farr.
- Alsobia dianthiflora (H.E.Moore & R.G.Wilson) Wiehler (syn. Episcia dianthiflora)
- Alsobia jaltenangensis Ram.-Roa & Ibarra-Vázq.
- Alsobia magnifica R.García Mart. & Beutelsp.
- Alsobia punctata (Lindl.) Hanst. (syn. Episcia punctata)

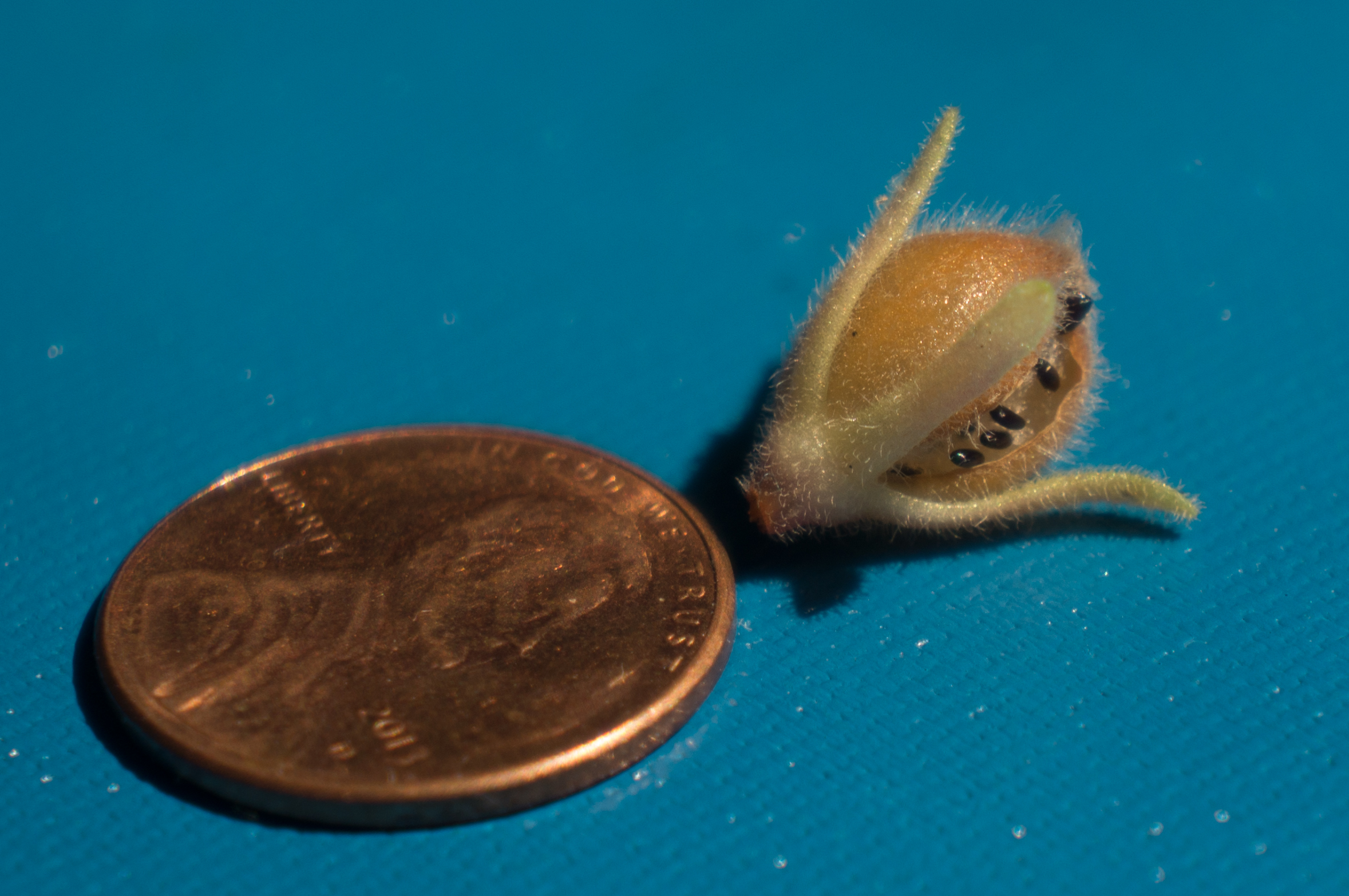
Seedpod of Alsobia dianthiflora
