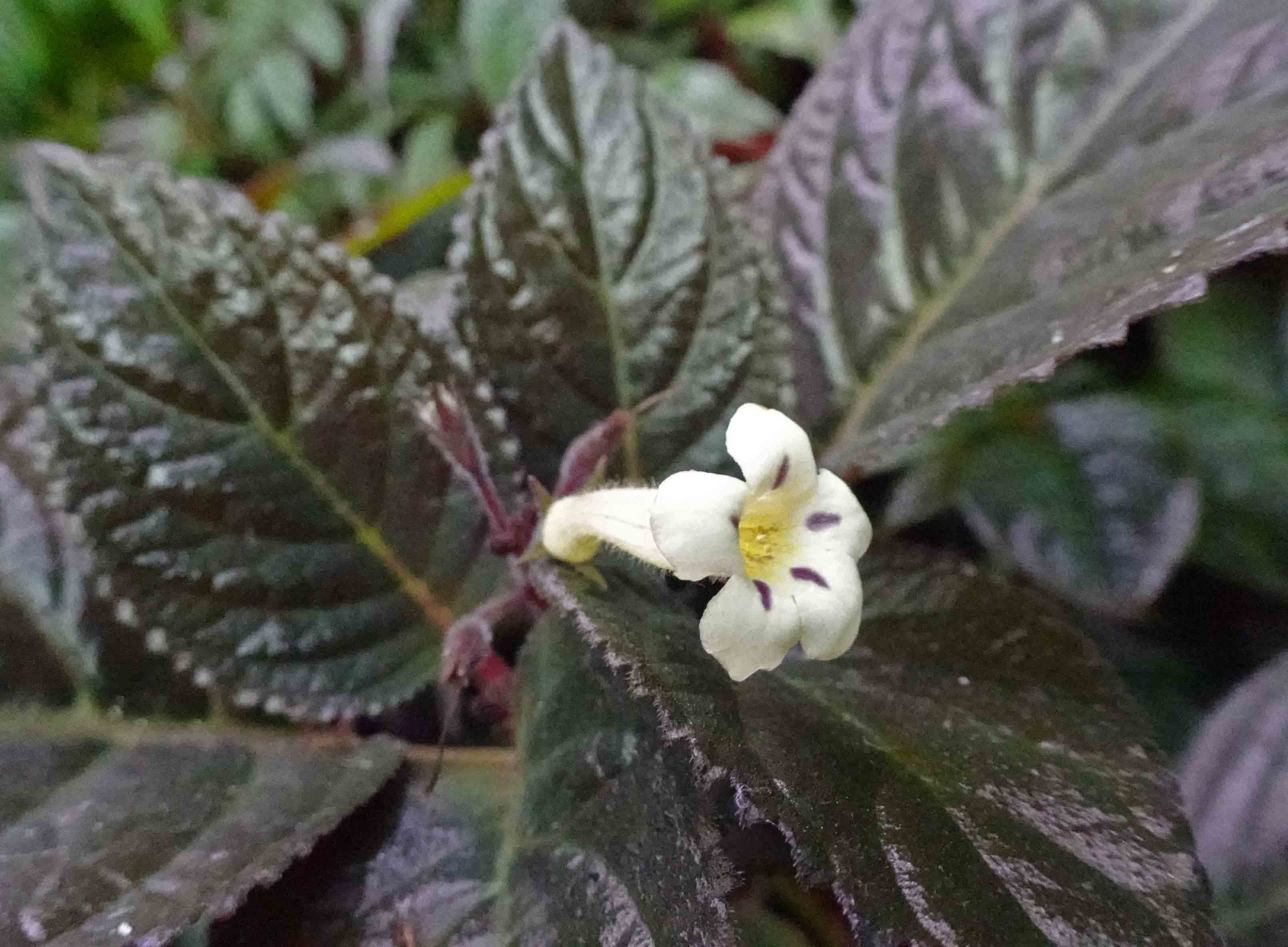
- Nautilocalyx glandulifer

Scientific classification
- Kingdom: Plantae
- Clade: Tracheophytes
- Clade: Angiosperms
- Clade: Eudicots
- Clade: Asterids
- Order: Lamiales
- Family: Gesneriaceae
- Genus: Nautilocalyx; Linden ex Hanst. (1854)

Synonyms
- Physodeira Hanst. (1854)

= Nautilocalyx =

Genus of flowering plants

Nautilocalyx is a genus of plants in the family Gesneriaceae. Its native range stretches from Costa Rica to southern Tropical America and to Trinidad. It is also found in Bolivia, Brazil, Colombia, Costa Rica, Ecuador, French Guiana, Guyana, Panamá, Peru, Suriname, Trinidad-Tobago and Venezuela.

== Species ==
The following species are recognised in the genus Nautilocalyx:

- Nautilocalyx aeneus (Linden & André) Wiehler
- Nautilocalyx antioquensis Wiehler
- Nautilocalyx arenarius L.E.Skog & Steyerm.
- Nautilocalyx bicolor (Hook.) Wiehler
- Nautilocalyx biserrulatus Kriebel
- Nautilocalyx bracteatus (Linden) Sprague
- Nautilocalyx bullatus (Lem.) Sprague
- Nautilocalyx cataractarum Wiehler
- Nautilocalyx colombianus Wiehler
- Nautilocalyx decumbens (Mart.) Wiehler
- Nautilocalyx ecuadoranus Wiehler
- Nautilocalyx erytranthus J.L.Clark & M.M.Mora
- Nautilocalyx fasciculatus L.E.Skog & Steyerm.
- Nautilocalyx forgetii (Sprague) Sprague
- Nautilocalyx glandulifer Wiehler
- Nautilocalyx hirsutus (Sprague) Sprague
- Nautilocalyx hirtiflorus (Spruce ex Hanst.) Sprague
- Nautilocalyx kohlerioides (Leeuwenb.) Wiehler
- Nautilocalyx lehmannii Wiehler
- Nautilocalyx leticianus Wiehler
- Nautilocalyx luciani (Linden & E.Fourn.) Wiehler
- Nautilocalyx lynchii (Hook.f.) Sprague
- Nautilocalyx maguirei L.E.Skog & Steyerm.
- Nautilocalyx membranaceus (C.V.Morton) Wiehler
- Nautilocalyx mimuloides (Benth.) C.V.Morton
- Nautilocalyx mulfordii Wiehler
- Nautilocalyx pallidus (Sprague) Sprague
- Nautilocalyx pemphidius L.E.Skog
- Nautilocalyx peruvianus Wiehler
- Nautilocalyx picturatus L.E.Skog
- Nautilocalyx pictus (Hook.) Sprague
- Nautilocalyx punctatus Wiehler
- Nautilocalyx purpurascens Kriebel
- Nautilocalyx resioides (Leeuwenb.) Wiehler
- Nautilocalyx rugosus R.Rojas & J.L.Clark
- Nautilocalyx sastrei Wiehler
- Nautilocalyx silvaticus (Cuatrec.) Wiehler
- Nautilocalyx speciosus Wiehler
- Nautilocalyx urticifolius (Leeuwenb.) Wiehler
- Nautilocalyx vinosus Wiehler
- Nautilocalyx whitei Rusby

== Other sources ==
- USDA Germplasm Resources Information Network (GRIN) entry
- Brummitt, R. K. 1993. Report of the Committee for Spermatophyta: 39. Taxon 42:878.
- Feuillet, C. & L. E. Skog. 1990. (991) Proposal to conserve 7857a Nautilocalyx against Centrosolenia (Gesneriaceae: Gesnerioideae). Taxon 39:691–693.
