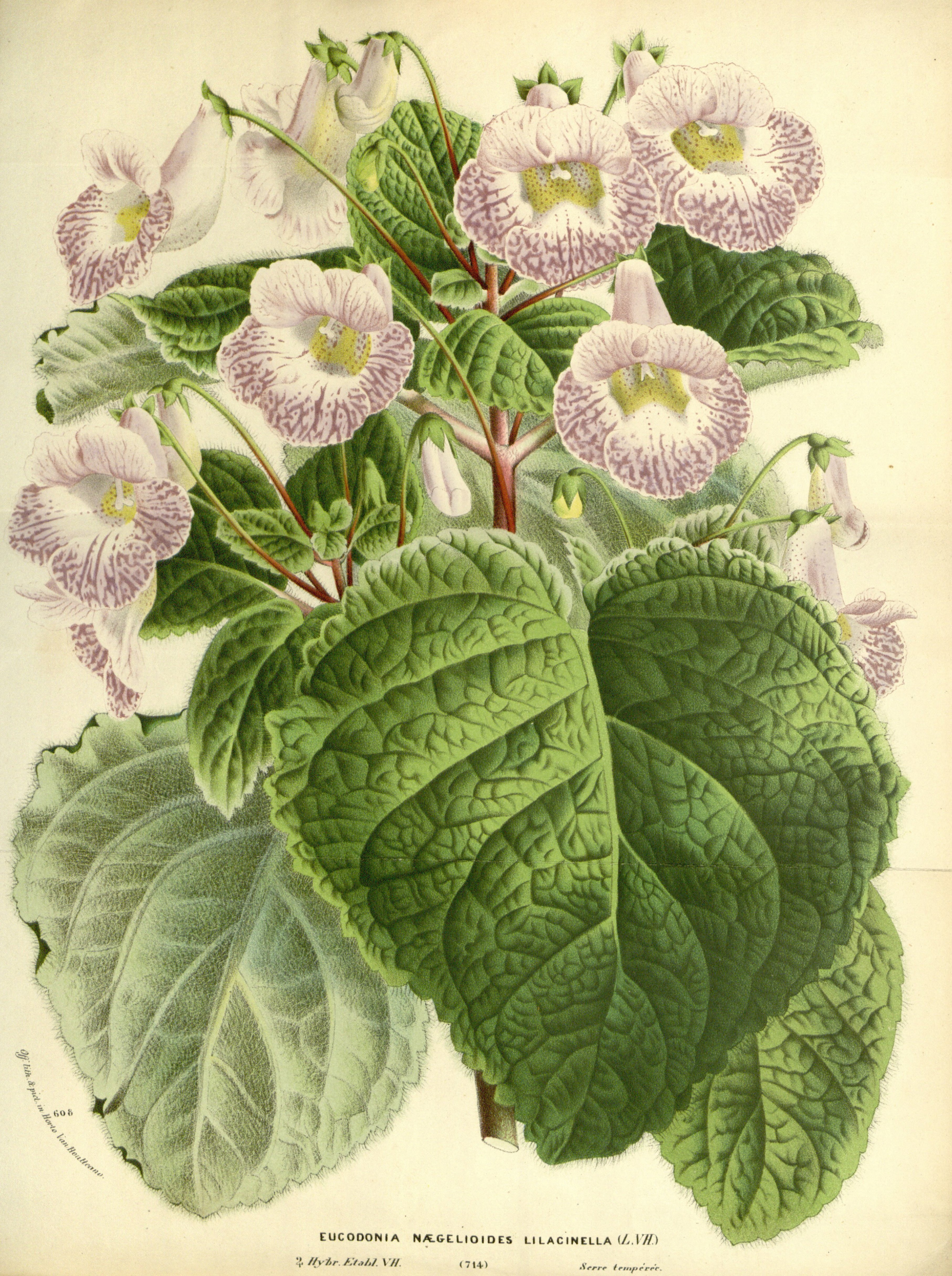
- Flore des serres v17

Scientific classification
- Kingdom: Plantae
- Clade: Tracheophytes
- Clade: Angiosperms
- Clade: Eudicots
- Clade: Asterids
- Order: Lamiales
- Family: Gesneriaceae
- Genus: Eucodonia; Hanst.

= Eucodonia =

Genus of plants

Eucodonia is a genus of flowering plants belonging to the family Gesneriaceae.

Its native range is Southern Mexico.

Species:

- Eucodonia andrieuxii (DC.) Wiehler
- Eucodonia verticillata (M.Martens & Galeotti) Wiehler
